= New York City-Israel Economic Council =

Agency overview
- Formed: May 19, 2025
- Parent department: Office of the Mayor of New York City
- Parent agency: Mayor's Office of International Affairs

The New York City-Israel Economic Council is a unit of the Office of the Mayor of New York City established in 2025 under Mayor Eric Adams to "strengthen economic ties and promote innovation between the two governments".

== History ==
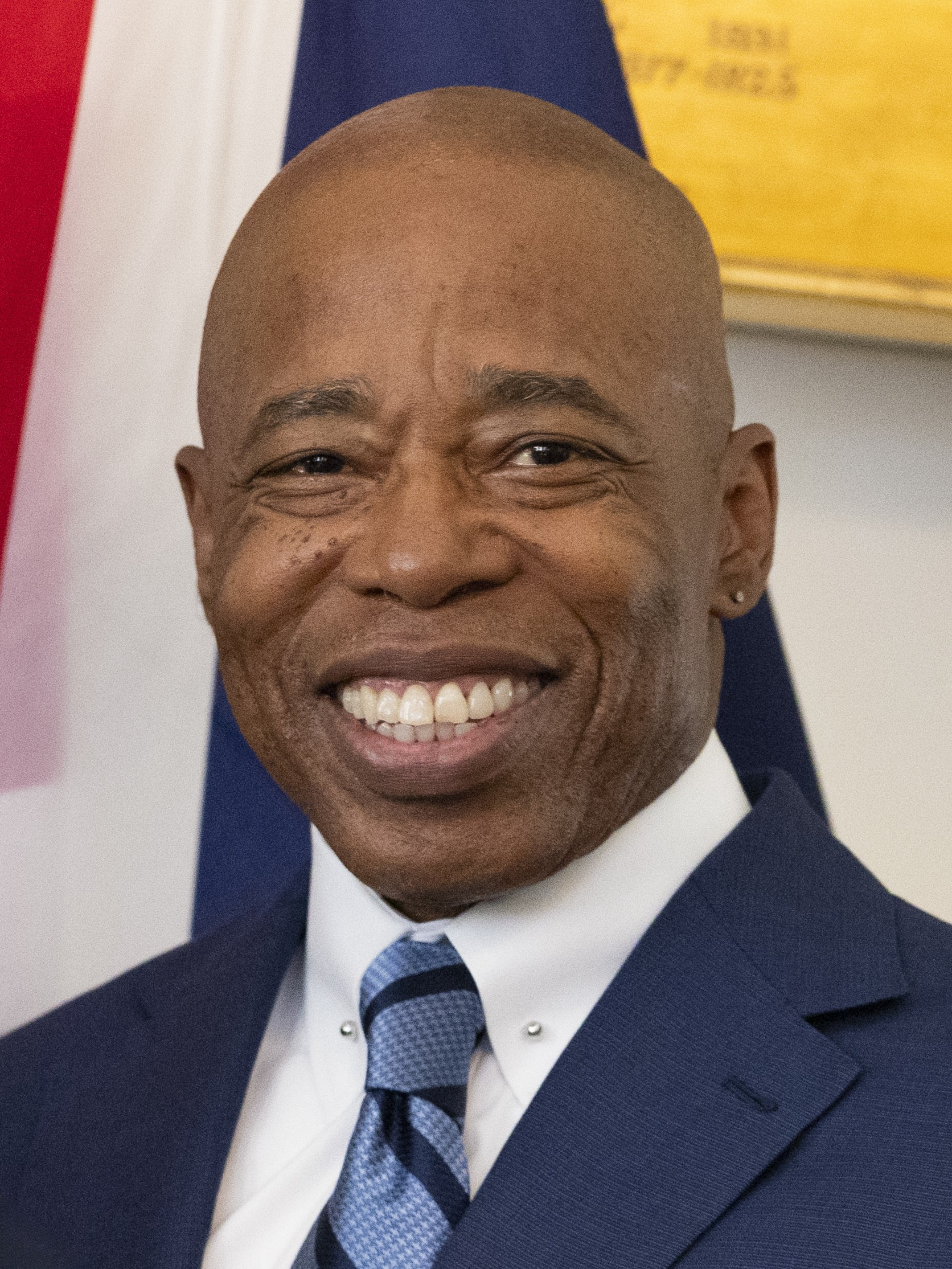
Eric Adams

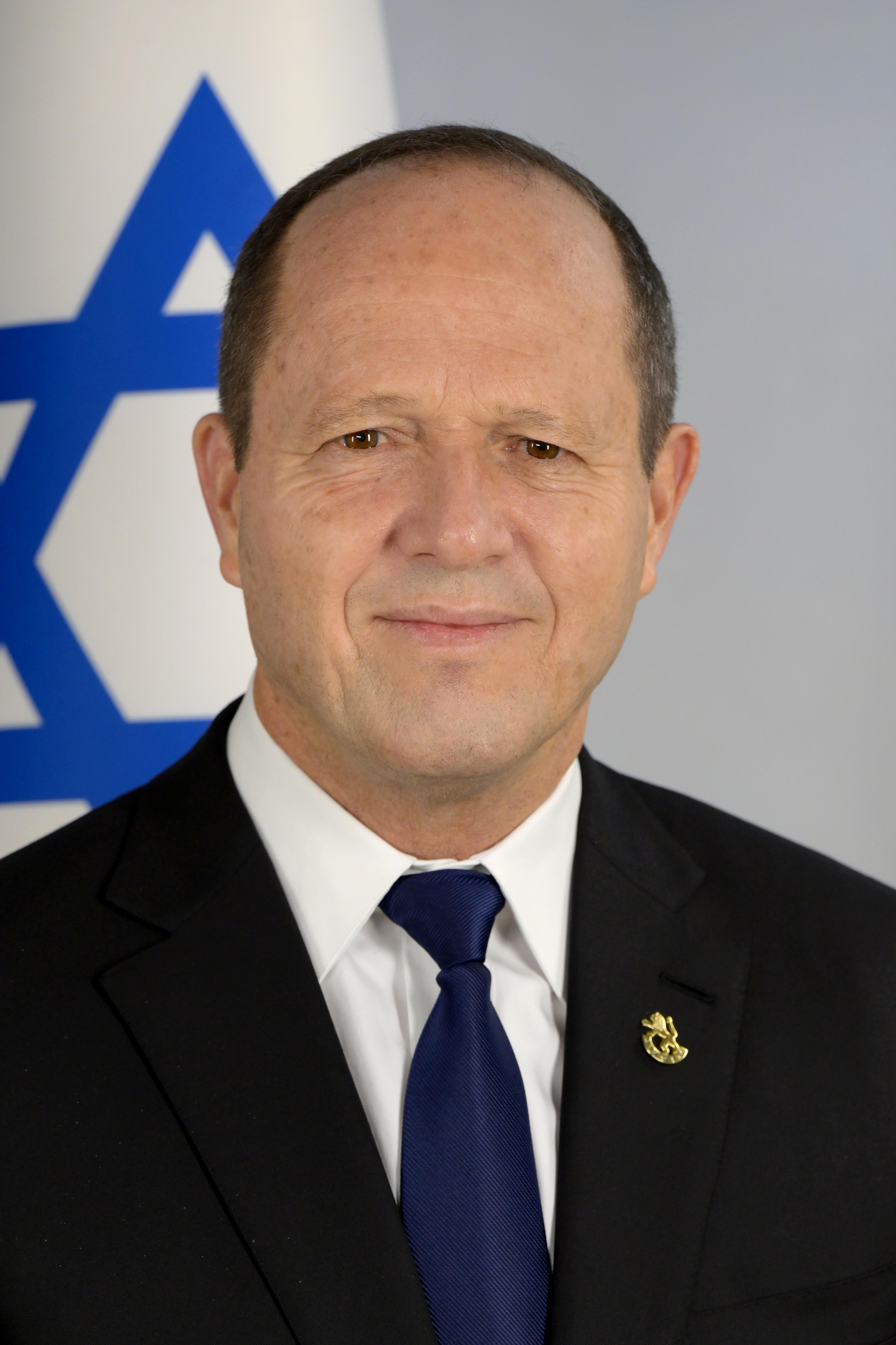
Nir Barkat

The council was announced on by Adams and Israeli Economy Minister Nir Barkat on May 19, 2025, at a signing ceremony for a declaration of intent at New York City Hall.

As of 2026, the council has not been active following the inauguration of Mayor Zohran Mamdani, which Mamdani said he would end during his campaign for Mayor.

The New York-Israel Chamber of Commerce Coalition was subsequently established as a New York City-based coalition established in February 2026 to "protect the right to create, sustain and grow" businesses with an Israeli affiliation. The Times of Israel reported the coalition was reformed in response to "concerns over" Mamdani, who took office in January 2026 and has supported the Boycott, Divestment and Sanctions movement against Israel.
