= Teddy Kollek =

Israeli politician (1911–2007)

- טדי קולק
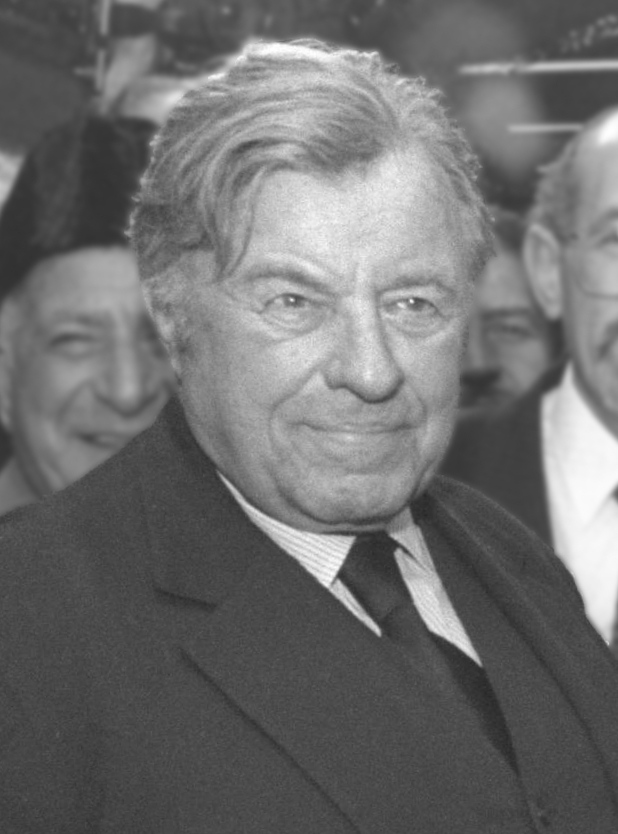
- Kollek in 1984

Mayor of Jerusalem
- In office 29 November 1965 – 2 November 1993
- Preceded by: Mordechai Ish-Shalom
- Succeeded by: Ehud Olmert

Personal details
- Born: Kollek Tivadar; 27 May 1911 Nagyvázsony, Kingdom of Hungary
- Died: 2 January 2007 (aged 95) Jerusalem, Israel
- Cause of death: Natural Causes
- Resting place: Mount Herzl National Cemetery, Jerusalem
- Citizenship: Israel
- Party: Rafi; Labour
- Spouse: Tamar Schwarz (1917–2013)
- Children: 2
- Parent(s): Alfred and Margaret
- Occupation: Politician
- Awards: Peace Prize of the German Book Trade (1985) Israel Prize (1988) Honorary Citizen of Vienna (2001)

Theodor "Teddy" Kollek (Hebrew: טדי קולק; 27 May 1911 – 2 January 2007) was an Israeli politician who served as the mayor of Jerusalem from 1965 to 1993.

== Early life and marriage ==
Theodor Kollek (né Kollek Tivadar) was born in Nagyvázsony, 120 km (75 miles) from Budapest, Hungary. His parents, Alfred and Margaret (née Fleischer), named him after Theodor Herzl. The family moved to Vienna in 1918. Growing up in the Austrian capital city, Kollek came to share his father Alfréd's Zionist convictions.

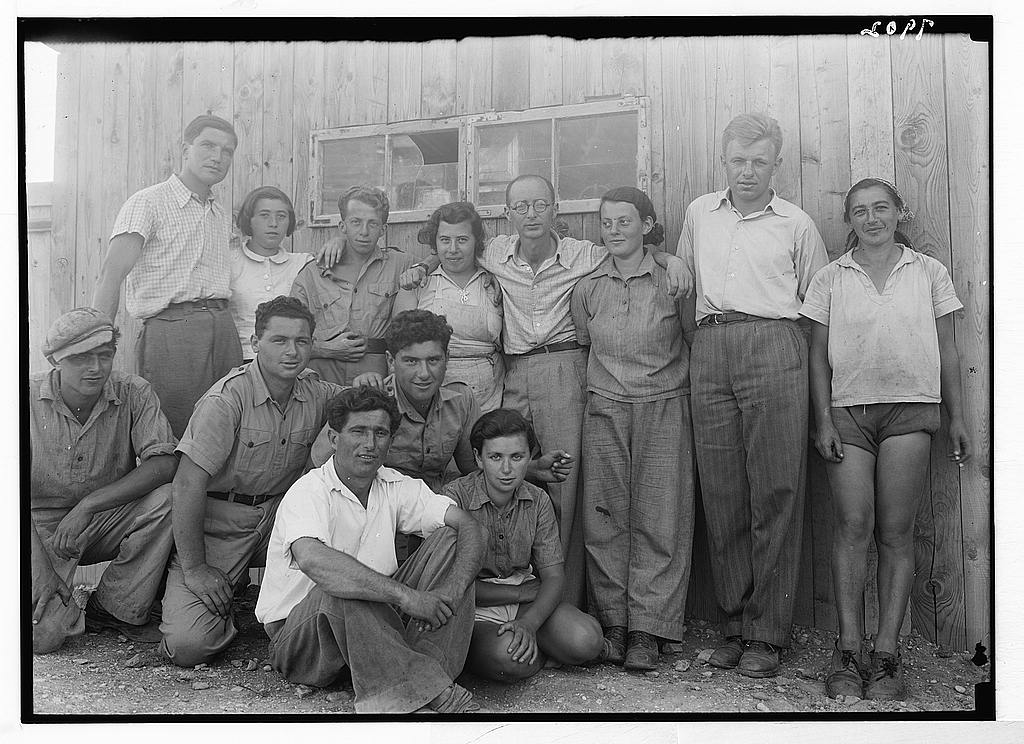
Kollek (second from the right) with the Ein Gev Pioneers (1934–39)

In 1935, three years before the Nazis seized Austria, the Kollek family immigrated to British-controlled Mandatory Palestine. In 1937, he was one of the founders of Kibbutz Ein Gev, on the shore of Lake Kinneret. That same year he married Tamar Schwarz (1917–2013). (Note: Daughter of Rabbi Arthur Zacharias Schwarz (1880–1939), son of Rabbi Adolf Schwarz (1846–1931), rector of the Israelite Theological School.) They had two children, a son, the film director Amos Kollek (born in 1947), and a daughter, Osnat.

== Intelligence services ==
=== The "Hunting Season" ===
In 1942 Kollek was appointed the Jewish Agency's deputy head of intelligence. Between January 1945 and May 1946 he was the Agency's chief external liaison officer in Jerusalem and was in contact with MI5's main representative as well as members of British Military Intelligence. In the 1940s, on behalf of the Jewish Agency (Sochnut) and as part of the "Hunting Season" or "Saison", Teddy Kollek was the Jewish Agency's contact person with the British Mandate MI5, providing information against right-wing Jewish underground groups Irgun and Lehi (known as "Stern Gang"). He succeeded Reuven Zaslani and preceded Zeev Sherf in this function, and was carrying out the Jewish Agency's policy of assisting the British in fighting these groups. On 10 August 1945, he revealed to MI5 the location of a secret Irgun training camp near Binyamina. Twenty-seven Irgun members were arrested in the raid that followed.

=== Second World War ===
During World War II, Kollek tried to represent Jewish interests in Europe on behalf of the Jewish Agency.

=== Cooperation with the USA ===
From 1947 to 1948, he represented the Haganah in Washington, where he assisted in acquiring ammunition for Israel's then-fledgling army.

Kollek was a key figure in creating an alliance between the Mossad and the CIA during the 1940s and 1950s. In 1950, he accidentally encountered Kim Philby, whom he had known from his Vienna days, at the offices of the CIA, and warned James Angleton that Philby was a Soviet agent in the 30s.

== In national politics ==
Kollek became a close ally of David Ben-Gurion, serving in the latter's governments from 1952 as the director general of the prime minister's office.

== Mayor of Jerusalem ==
In 1965, Kollek succeeded Mordechai Ish-Shalom as Mayor of Jerusalem. On his motivations for seeking the mayor's office in Jerusalem, Kollek once recalled: “I got into this by accident [...] I was bored. When the city was united, I saw this as an historic occasion. To take care of it and show better care than anyone else ever has is a full life purpose. I think Jerusalem is the one essential element in Jewish history. A body can live without an arm or a leg, not without the heart. This is the heart and soul of it.”

During his tenure, Jerusalem developed into a modern city, leading him to be described as "the greatest builder of Jerusalem since Herod." Kollek was re-elected five times, in 1969, 1973, 1978, 1983, and 1989, serving 28 years as mayor of Jerusalem. In a reluctant seventh bid for mayor in 1993, Kollek, aged 82, lost to Likud candidate and future prime minister of Israel Ehud Olmert.

=== Relationship with the Arab community ===
During his tenure as mayor, East Jerusalem, which had been under Jordanian control since 1948, was captured by Israel in the Six-Day War of 1967. Kollek's approach toward the Arab inhabitants of Jerusalem was governed by pragmatism. Following the reunification of Jerusalem, he arranged for the provision of milk for Arab children. Some Israelis considered him pro-Arab. Kollek advocated religious tolerance and made numerous efforts to reach out to the Arab community during his tenure. Muslims continued to have access to Masjid Al-Aqsa (i.e. the Temple Mount) for worship. While he was adamant that Jerusalem could not be divided again and remain under Israeli sovereignty, he believed in concessions to reach a final settlement.

Kollek's views on the annexation of East Jerusalem softened after leaving office.

=== Civic and cultural projects ===
Kollek dedicated himself to many cultural projects during his lengthy term in office, and founded and led the Jerusalem Foundation, through which he helped finance the projects. Kollek was also instrumental in the establishment of the Jerusalem Theater.

==== The Israel Museum ====
Kollek's most notable cultural project was the development and expansion of the Israel Museum. From 1965 to 1996, he was president of the museum, and officially designated its founder in 2000. When the museum celebrated its 25th anniversary in 1990, Kollek was named Avi HaMuze'on ("father of the museum").

Through a leadership which spanned decades, Kollek raised millions of dollars from private donors for civic development projects and cultural programs. Kollek once remarked that Israel needed a strong army, but it also needed expressions of culture and civilization.

==== Jerusalem zoo ====
Kollek was considered the "number-one friend" of the Jerusalem Biblical Zoo, which occupied a 15-acre (61,000 m^{2}) site in Romema from 1950 to 1991. Though the zoo attracted many visitors to its exhibits of animals, reptiles and birds mentioned in the Bible and was successful in breeding and protecting endangered species, it was considered small and inferior to zoos in Tel Aviv and Haifa. Kollek promoted the idea of moving the zoo to a larger location and upgrading it to a state-of-the-art institution. Around 1990, under the auspices of the Jerusalem Foundation, the Tisch family of New York agreed to underwrite the expensive undertaking. The zoo re-opened as The Tisch Family Zoological Garden in Jerusalem on a 62-acre (250,000 m^{2}) expanse near the neighborhood of Malha in 1993. Kollek helped the zoo raise money to build the elephant enclosure and to bring in female elephants from Thailand at $50,000 apiece. The zoo named its male elephant Teddy and one of its female elephants Tamar in honor of Kollek and his wife. For Kollek's 90th birthday in 2001, the zoo feted him and the Jerusalem Foundation unveiled a new sculpture garden dedicated in his honor.

== Retirement and death ==
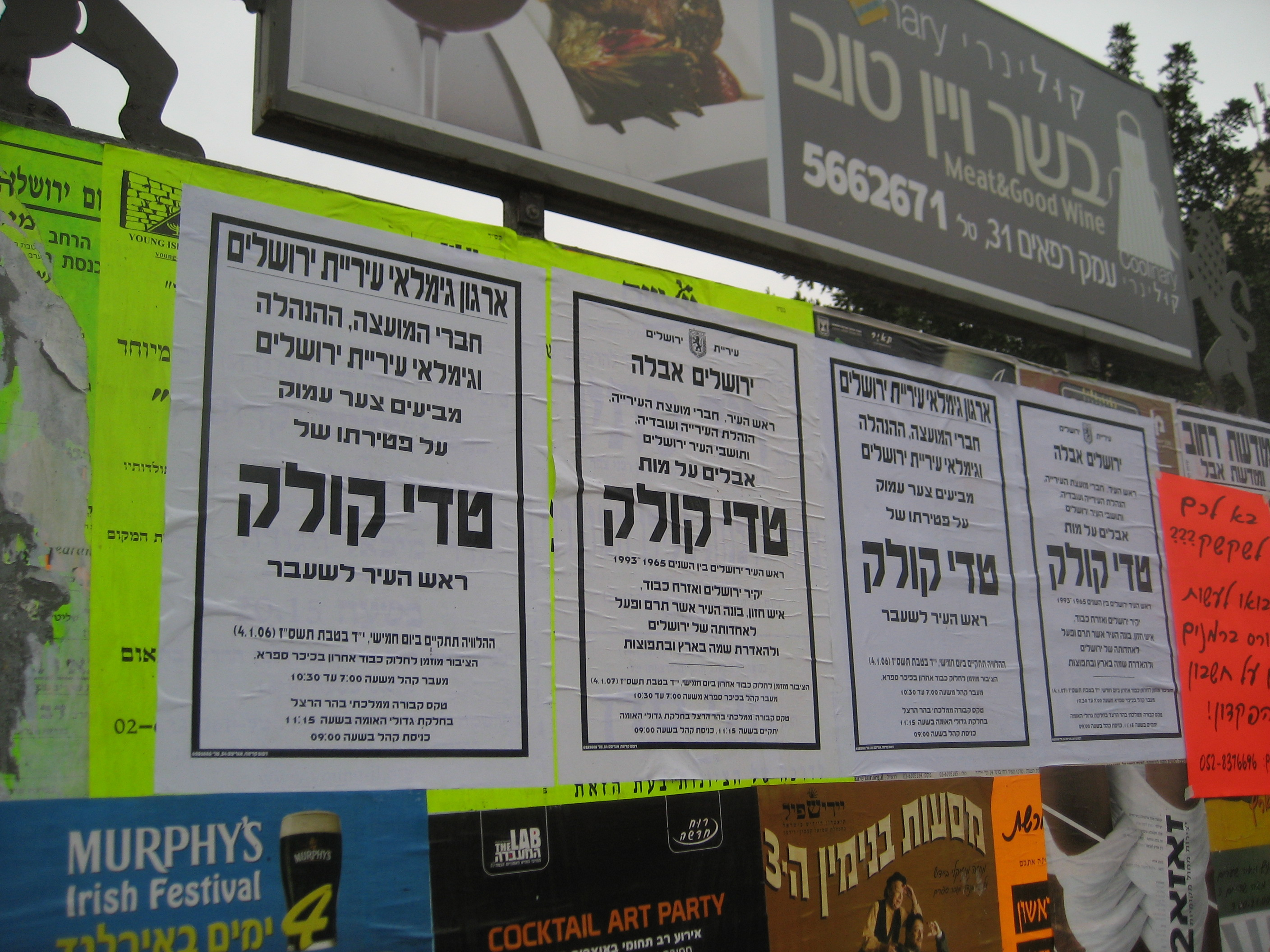
Posters in Jerusalem mourning Teddy Kollek, 4 January 2007

Kollek continued to be active in retirement, maintaining a five-day work week into his nineties, even as he became increasingly infirm. He and his wife lived in their walk-up Rehavia apartment until the mid-1990s, when they moved to Hod Yerushalayim, a retirement home in the Kiryat HaYovel neighborhood.

Kollek died on 2 January 2007. He is buried at the Mount Herzl national cemetery.

== Awards and distinctions ==
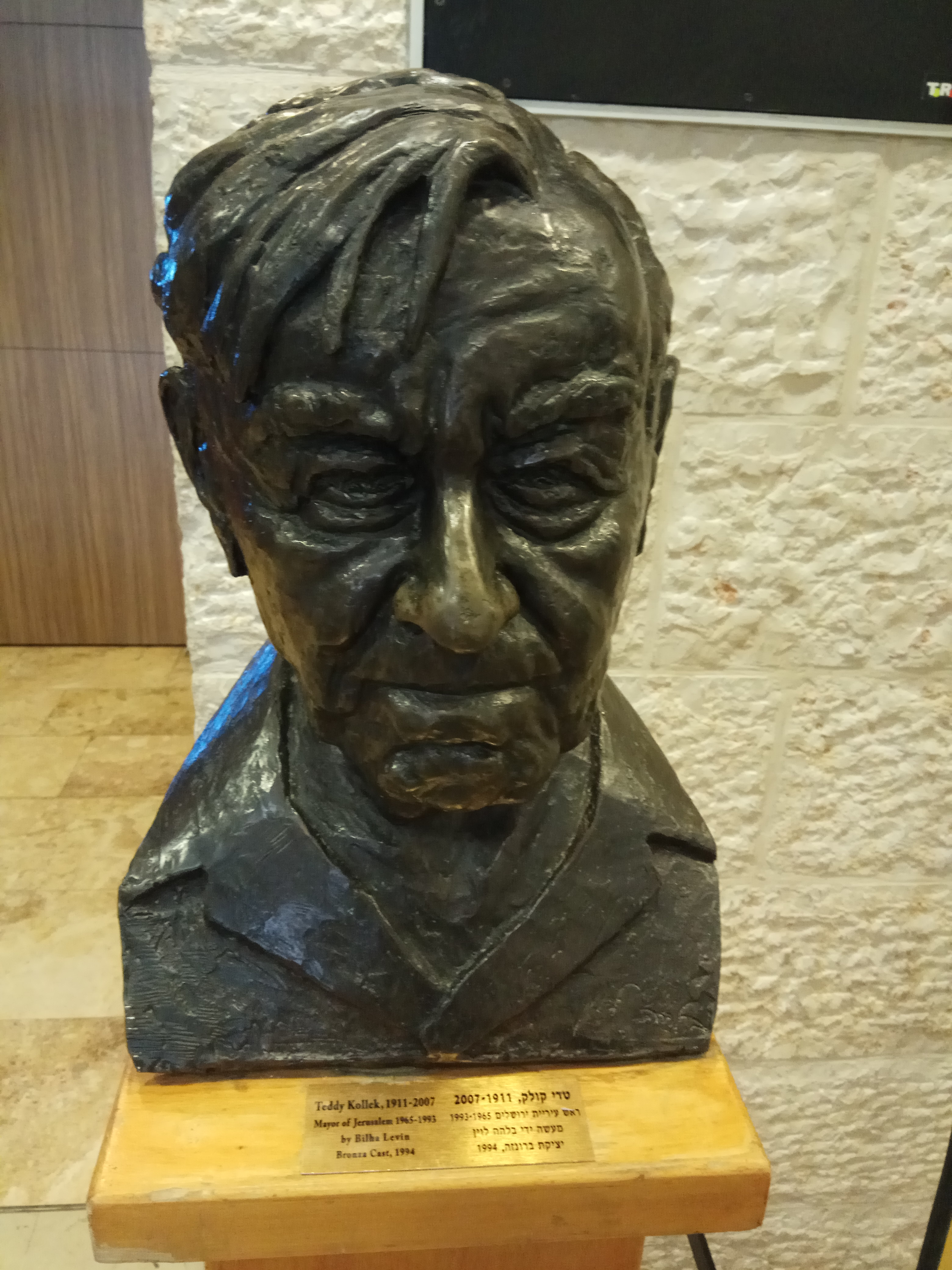
Sculpture of Kollek

- In 1985, Kollek was awarded the Peace Prize of the German Book Trade.
- In 1988, he was awarded the Israel Prize for his special contribution to society and the State of Israel.
- In 1988, he received the Four Freedoms Award from the Roosevelt Institute for the Freedom of Worship.
- In 1996, Kollek was awarded the Prize of Tolerance of the European Academy of Sciences and Arts.
- In 2001, he was honoured with the title of Honorary Citizen of Vienna.

In Jerusalem, the Teddy Stadium in Malha and Teddy Park are named after him.

== Publications ==
- Kollek, Teddy; Pearlman, Moshe (1968): Jerusalem: A History of Forty Centuries, Random House, New York City, ISBN 0-3944-3125-1
- Kollek, Teddy; Kollek, Amos (1978): For Jerusalem: A Life, Weidenfeld & Nicolson, London, ISBN 0-2977-7290-2

== See also ==
- List of mayors of Jerusalem
- List of Israel Prize recipients
- List of honorary citizens of Vienna
