= Nissim Ze'ev =

Israeli politician

- נסים זאב
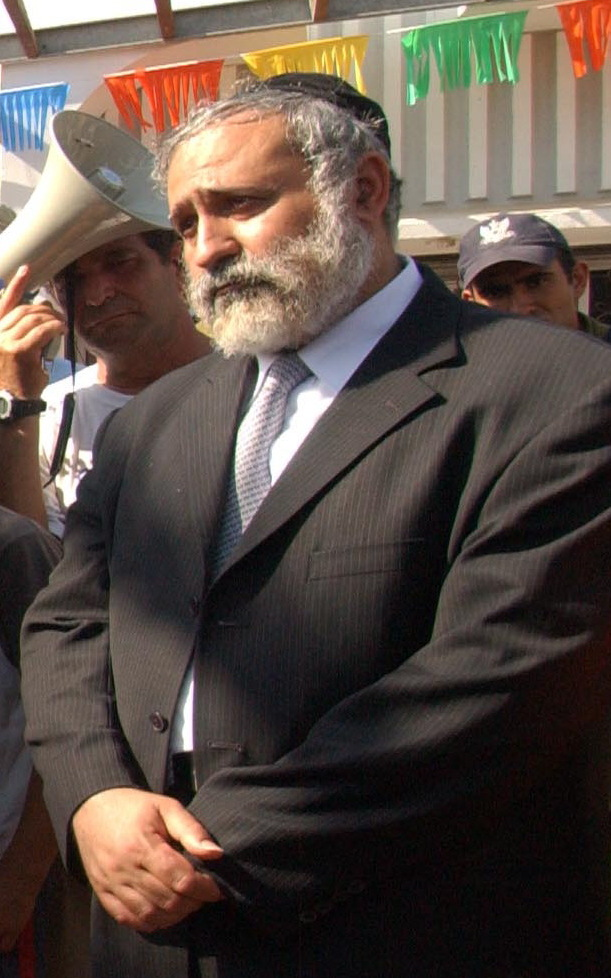

Faction represented in the Knesset
- 1999–2015: Shas

Personal details
- Born: 9 September 1951 (age 74) Jerusalem

Nissim Mordechai Ze'ev (Hebrew: נסים מרדכי זאב; born 9 September 1951) is an Israeli politician. One of the founders of Shas, he served as Deputy Mayor of Jerusalem between 1983 and 1998, and as a member of Knesset from 1999 until 2015.

== Biography ==
Ze'ev was born and resides in Jerusalem. He is married, and has a large family. He is a graduate of Porat Yosef Yeshiva, and was ordained to the Rabbinate. He has served as a Rabbi, Shochet, Mohel, and Chazzan in Israel and abroad.

He began his Torah activities in his youth when, in 1968, he established Torah youth clubs named "Irgun Yeladim Lomdei Torah" (Association of Children Who Study Torah). They were established in memory of the IDF soldiers who died when the INS Eilat was lost in 1967. Hundreds of students participated in this club in the afternoon studying "Ta'amei Hamikra" (Torah incantations), Psalms, Jewish Law, and Jewish Legend.

In 1971, Ze'ev served as a rabbi and shochet in the Ein HaEmek moshav. Three years later, he was sent abroad as a shochet and inspector on behalf of the Chief Rabbinate of Israel. He would ultimately spend five years away from Israel, going to Mexico City in 1977, to help establish the Aram Tzova Kollel, then to the "Sephardic Jewish Center" in Brooklyn, New York, where he served as rabbi and chazzan. In 1979, he returned to Israel to establish the "Nevat Israel" Institutes for Sephardic Jewish girls - ranging from kindergarten, to elementary schools, to high schools, and to a teaching seminary to train teachers and kindergarten teachers.

=== Political career ===
In the summer of 1983, he established a non-profit organization called the "Sephardic Association of Torah Observers", and served as its chairman. In addition to educational, cultural, and charitable activities, the association was involved in the selection of representatives to appear as a political list for the elections for local municipalities and the Knesset. The first meeting of the association convened shortly thereafter in the Yesodei Torah Yeshiva in Jerusalem. Participants included the president of the Torah Elders Council, Chief Rabbi Ovadia Yosef, as well as Rabbi Shalom Cohen, Rabbi Yehuda Tzadka (Head of the Porat Yoseph Yeshiva), and Rabbi Shabtai Aton. With their blessings, the Shas party ran for the first time for the local elections in Jerusalem, with Ze'ev at its head, and succeeded in winning three seats. Between 1983 and 1998, Ze'ev served as deputy mayor of Jerusalem in charge of the Welfare Department, as well as chairman of the Allotments of Land for Public Institutes and chairman of the Exemption Committee for Arnona. He was a candidate in the 1993 Jerusalem mayoral election, but finished third with only 5% of the vote.

In 1999, Ze'ev was elected to the Knesset on the Shas list, and was re-elected in 2003, 2006, 2009, and 2013. During his time in the Knesset, he served as a member of the Knesset Committee, the Foreign Affairs and Defense Committee, the Constitution, Law, and Justice Committee, and the Committee on Interior Affairs. In the 17th Knesset (2006–2009), he served as chairman of the Knesset Committee on the War Against Drugs and Alcohol, coordinating with all the relevant agencies and holding many meetings which led to a body of legislation to fight drug and alcohol abuse.

He was not included in the Shas list for the 2015 elections after being removed from the list by Shas leader Aryeh Deri.

== Views ==
Ze'ev is known for his strong opposition to the evacuation of Jews from Israeli settlements. To advance this cause, he established the Knesset Caucus for Israel, Judaism, and Global Ethics, and presented legislative proposals to prevent the evacuation of settlers against their will. Among the other laws initiated by him are the Law to Increase Child Allotments, the Law to Punish Terrorists, the Abortion Law, the Incitement Law, and the Law to Recognize the Rights of Jewish Refugees from Arab Lands.

In June 2007, he compared homosexuals to drug addicts, and suggested that rehabilitation centers be set up for them throughout Israel, saying: "The government should initiate this; these people are unfortunate, and we must keep an eye on them to assist them... I am not speaking of a closed institution, but of a center that will accept anyone who walks through its doors... We must set up special teams of psychologists, psychiatrists, and social workers who will help them return to a normal life, just like in a drug rehabilitation center."

He also claimed that gay people must be made aware of "how their lifestyle is destroying our existence", and that MKs "propose numerous bills to help barren women become more fertile, but on the other hand, we allow this immorality".

Legal offices
Preceded by Yair Peretz	Chairman of the Committee on Drug Abuse; 2006–2009	Succeeded by Mohammad Barakeh
