= Mayoral elections in Jerusalem =

Elections for the mayor of Jerusalem

Elections are held in Jerusalem to elect the city's mayor. Currently, such elections are regularly scheduled to elect mayors to five-year terms.

== General history ==
Prior to a 1975 national law change, mayors were chosen by the city council (which was elected in a closed list proportional representation system).

Since 1975 law change, mayors have been directly elected in a two round system. Under this system, if no candidate receives at least 40% of the vote in the first round, a runoff election is held between the top-two finishers. The first municipal election to be held under the new law of direct elections for mayor was held in 1978.

== 1978 ==
1978 Jerusalem mayoral election
- 7 November 1978
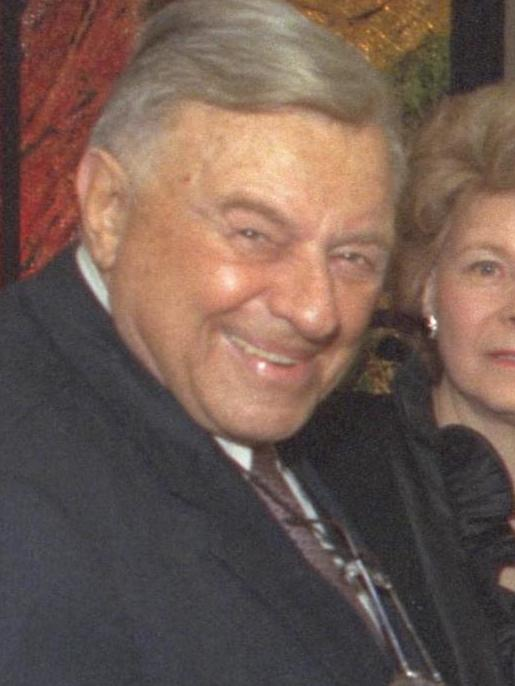

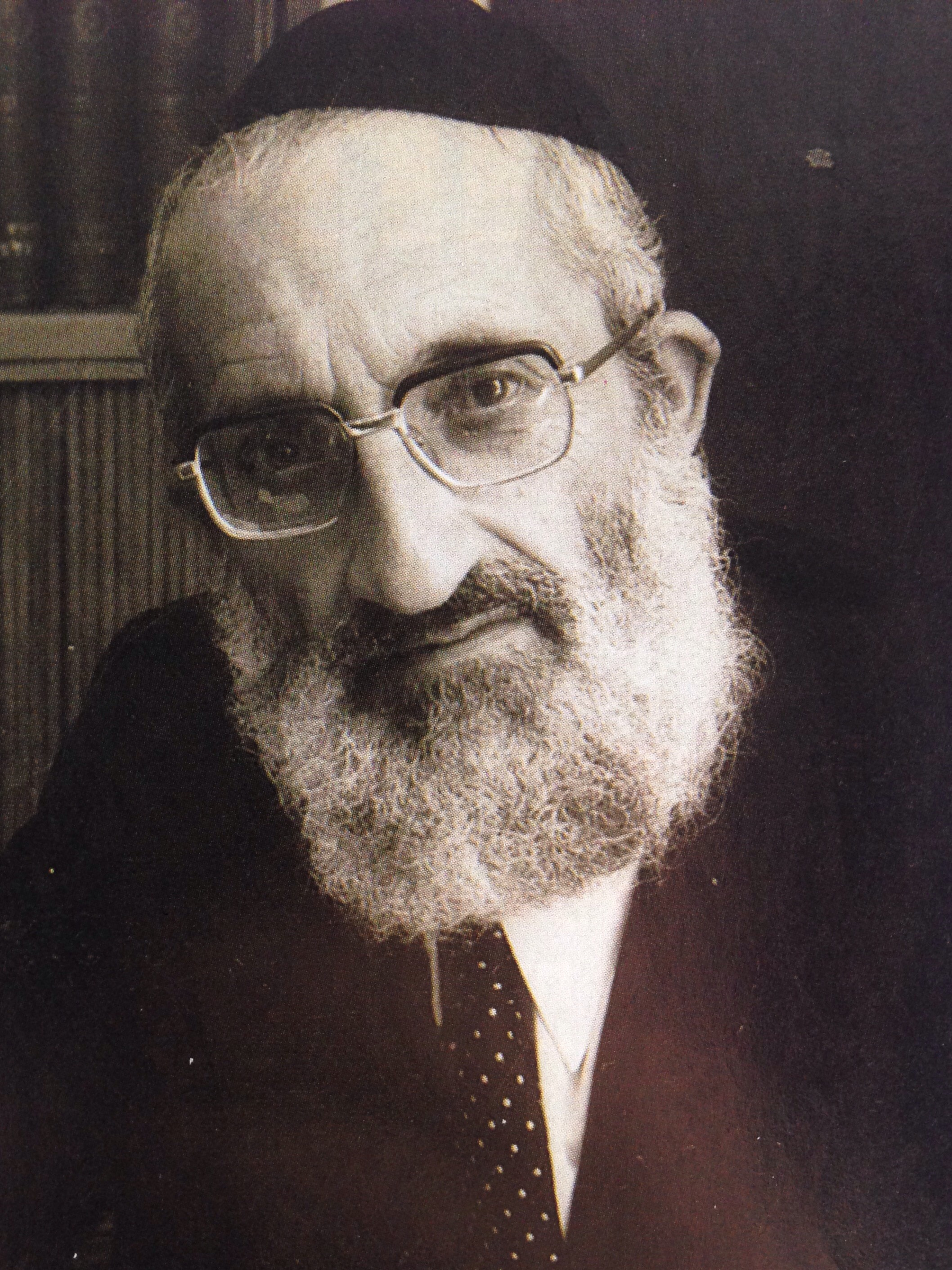

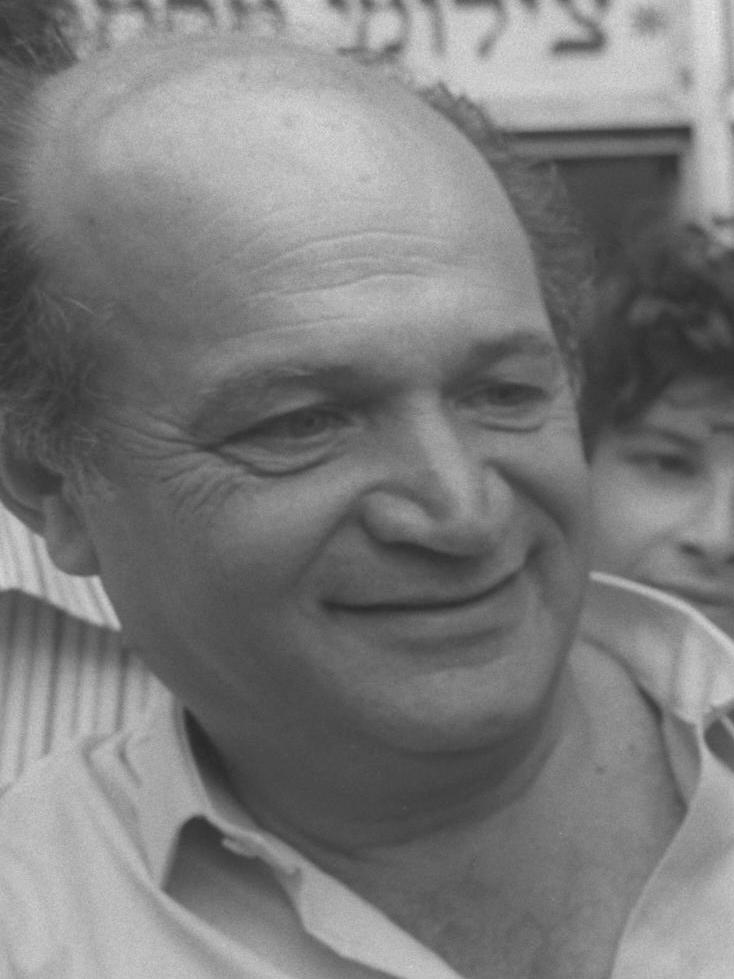

Candidate	Teddy Kollek	Shmuel Elazar Shaulson
Popular vote	64,622	15,242
Percentage	62.7%	14.7%
Candidate	Yehoshua Matza	Moshe Medalbom
Party	Likud
Popular vote	13,616	9,638
Percentage	13.3%	9.3%
Mayor before election
Teddy Kollek
Labor
Elected mayor
Teddy Kollek
Labor

The 1978 Jerusalem mayoral election was held 8 November 1978, and saw the reelection of Teddy Kollek to a fourth consecutive term.

While a member of the Israeli Labor Party, Kollek formally ran as an independent.

1978 Jerusalem mayoral elections results
Candidate	Party	Votes	%
Teddy Kollek (incumbent)		64,622	62.7
Shmuel Elazar Shaulson		15,242	14.7
Yehoshua Matza	Likud	13,616	13.3
Moshe Medalbom		9,638	9.3
Total		103,118	100

== 1983 ==
1983 Jerusalem mayoral election
- 25 October 1983
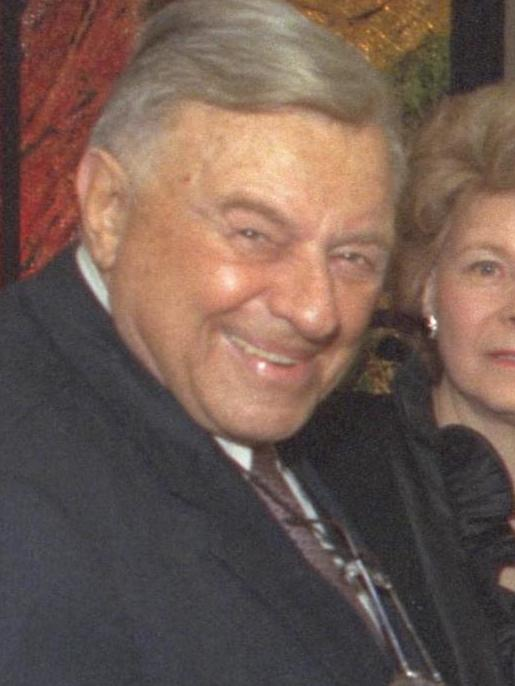

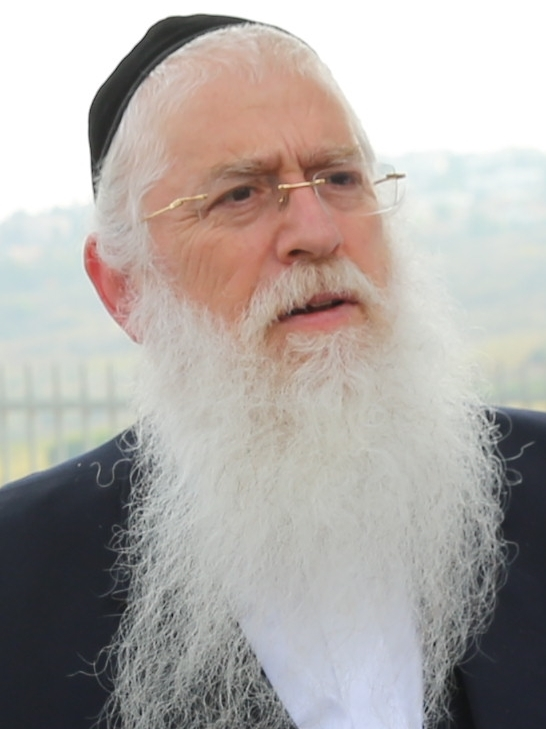
Candidate	Teddy Kollek	Shlomo Toussia-Cohen	Meir Porush
Party	One Jerusalem	Likud	Agudat Yisrael
Popular vote	79,535	23,912	17,737
Percentage	63.86%	19.20%	14.24%
Mayor before election
Teddy Kollek
Labor
Elected mayor
Teddy Kollek
Labor

The 1983 Jerusalem mayoral election was held 25 October 1983, and saw the reelection of Teddy Kollek to a fifth consecutive term.

The election took place among increasing tension between religious and nonreligious Jews in the city. Kollek spoke strongly against what he alleged were intolerant Orthodox factions that were seeking to enforce their lifestyle beliefs upon all Jerusalem. Kollek was assaulted by militantly religious youth ten days prior to the election. Turnout among Arab voters was over 25%. It is believed that many of the Arabs who opted to vote were municipal employees.

Despite efforts of some in the Palestine Liberation Organization to encourage a boycott among the city's East Jerusalem Arab electorate, this electorate came out in greater numbers than they had in previous mayoral elections. The Arab voters who participated strongly supported Kollek, contributing to his strong performance.

Ahead of the election, Kollek was heavily favored for reelection, as a result of his personal popularity. However, the coinciding election for the City Council was competitive, and it was seen as uncertain whether the "One Jerusalem" party list which Kollek fielded, would retain the majority it held. Orthodox and right wing political parties, in opposition of the mayor, were vying to flip control of the council. The "One Jerusalem" slate, ultimately, narrowly retained its majority on the council, winning 17 of 31 seats.

Since Kollek exceeded the 40% threshold required to avert a runoff election, no runoff was held.

1983 Jerusalem mayoral elections results
Candidate	Party	Votes	%
Teddy Kollek (incumbent)	One Jerusalem	79,535	63.86
Shlomo Toussia-Cohen	Likud	23,912	19.20
Meir Porush	Agudat Yisrael	17,737	14.24
Gershon Salomon		3,356	2.70
Total		124,540	100

== 1989 ==
1989 Jerusalem mayoral election
- 28 February 1989
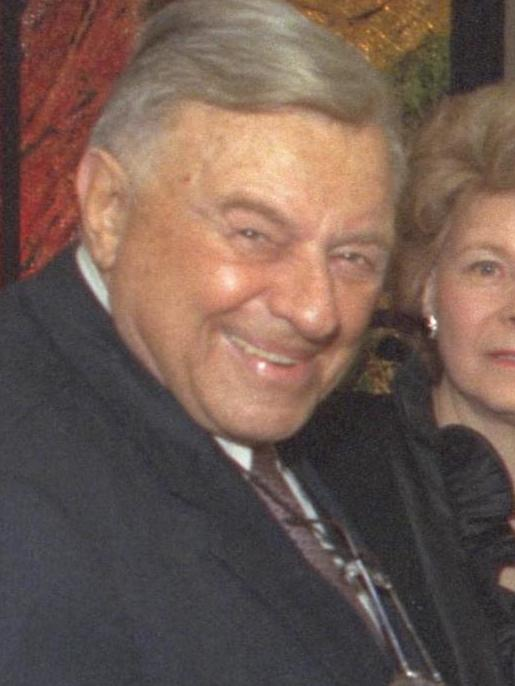

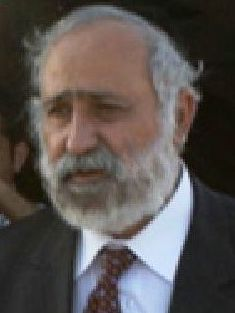

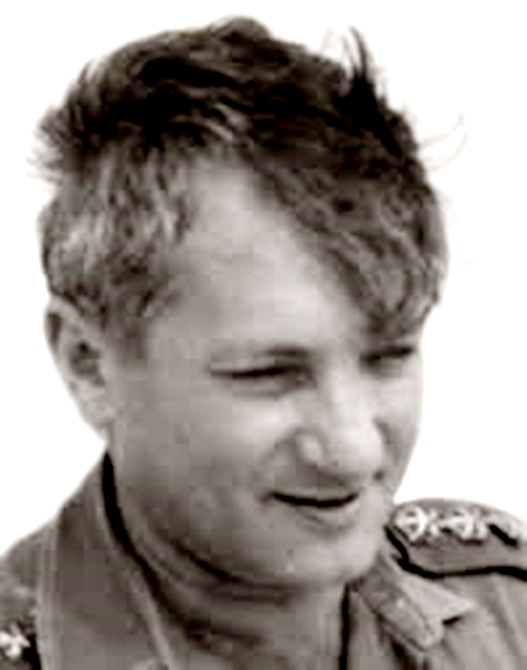

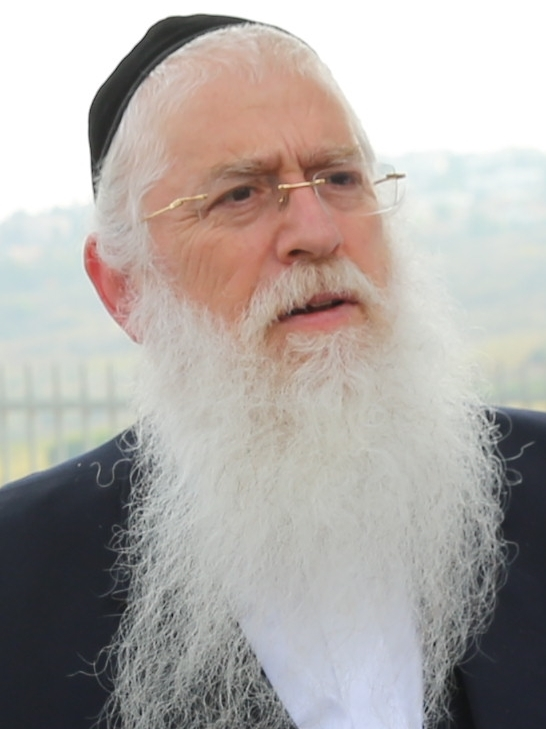
Candidate	Teddy Kollek	Nissim Ze'ev
Party	One Jerusalem	Shas
Popular vote	73,006	20,490
Percentage	58.8%	16.5%
Candidate	Shmuel Pressburger	Meir Porush
Party	Likud	Agudat Yisrael
Popular vote	16,369	13,646
Percentage	13.2%	11.0%
Mayor before election
Teddy Kollek
Labor
Elected mayor
Teddy Kollek
Labor

The 1989 Jerusalem mayoral election was held 28 February 1989, and saw the reelection of Teddy Kollek to a sixth consecutive term.

Kollek ran as the candidate of his own One Jerusalem Party, which was affiliated with the national Israeli Labor Party.

While he won an overwhelming victory in the mayoral election, his party list lost its majority on the Council of Jerusalem. This Council of Jerusalem result was partially attributable to Arab residents of the city voting in lesser numbers than in the recent preceding elections, with more Arabs than usual boycotting the municipal elections. Arab turnout was as small as under 4%. Another contributing factor was backlash from the left wing, who felt that Kollek had given too many compromises to the Haredi. Another contributing factor was a strong turnout of religious Jews, especially with Orthodox Jews, with the election especially seeing an abnormally high turnout of Haredi voters. Kollek had had a majority of the Council be directly aligned with him for the entirety of his mayoralty up to the 1989 election.

1989 Jerusalem mayoral elections results
Candidate	Party	Votes	%
Teddy Kollek (incumbent)	One Jerusalem	73,006	58.8
Nissim Ze'ev	Shas	20,490	16.5
Shmuel Pressburger	Likud	16,369	13.2
Meir Porush	Agudat Yisrael	13,646	11.0
Mike Kramer		748	0.5
Total		124,259	100

== 1993 ==
1993 Jerusalem mayoral election
- 2 November 1993
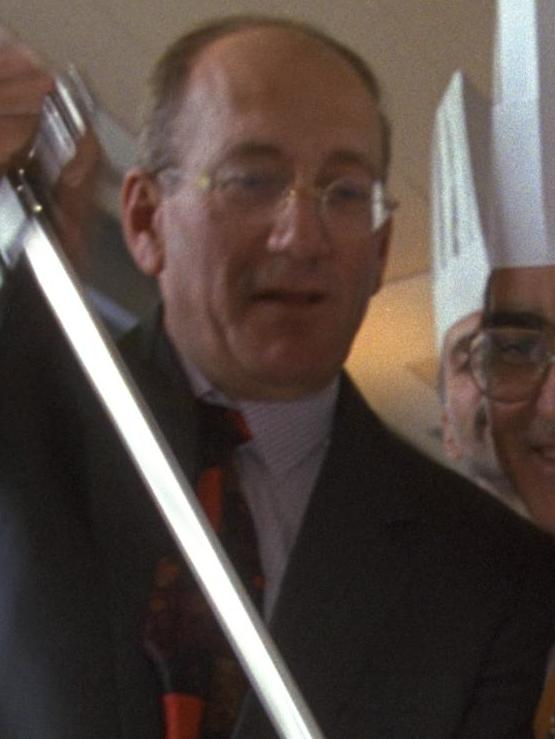

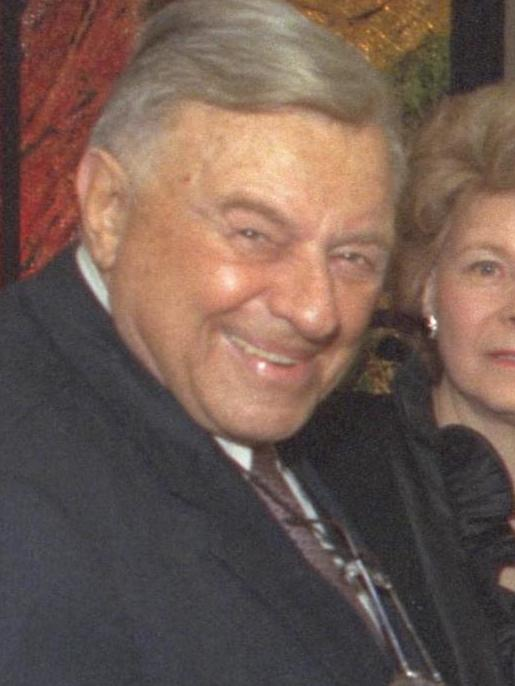

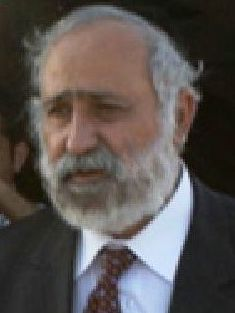
Candidate	Ehud Olmert	Teddy Kollek	Nissim Ze'ev
Party	Likud	Labor	Shas
Popular vote	90,992	53,954	8,300
Percentage	59.38%	35.21%	5.41%
Mayor before election
Teddy Kollek
Labor
Elected mayor
Ehud Olmert
Likud

The 1993 Jerusalem mayoral election was held 2 November 1993, and saw Likud nominee Ehud Olmert unseat Labor incumbent Teddy Kollek. This ended Kollek's 28-year mayoralty. This also marked the first time in roughly four decades that Jerusalem would have a mayor who was not a member of either the Israeli Labor Party or its predecessor organizations. This was seen as a handing a "blow" to the nation's governing Labor Party.

1993 Jerusalem mayoral elections results
Candidate	Party	Votes	%
Ehud Olmert	Likud	90,992	59.38
Teddy Kollek (incumbent)	Labor	53,954	35.21
Nissim Ze'ev	Shas	8,300	5.41
Total		153,246	100

== 1998 ==
1998 Jerusalem mayoral election
- 10 November 1998
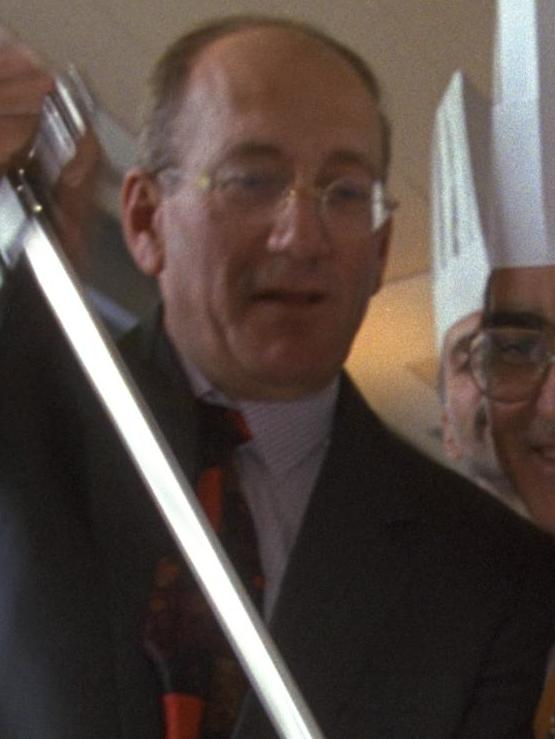

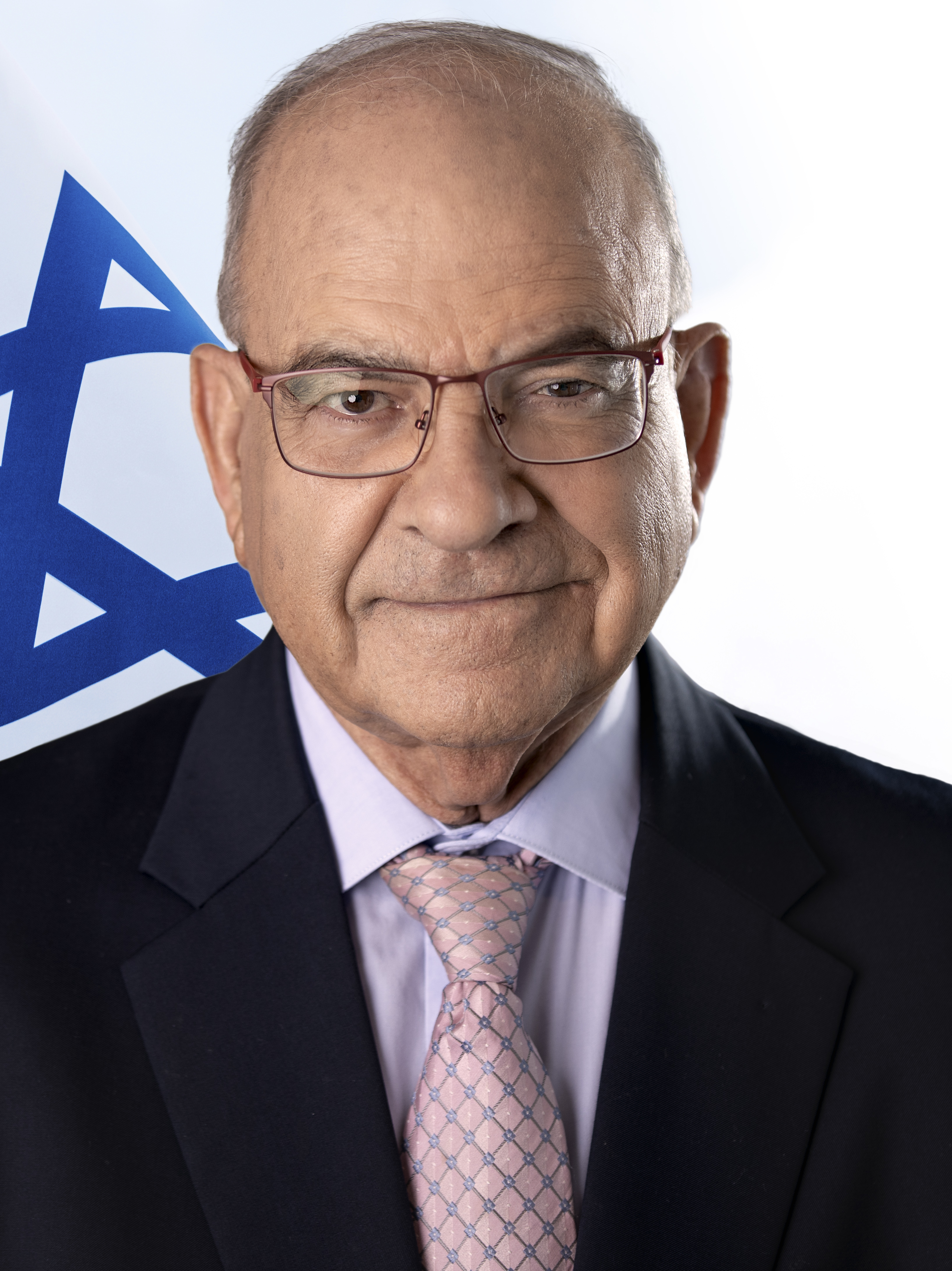

Candidate	Ehud Olmert	Shimon Shetreet	Ornan Yekutieli
Party	Likud	One Israel
Popular vote	97,171	36,567	13,540
Percentage	61.00%	22.95%	8.50%
Mayor before election
Ehud Olmert
Likud
Elected mayor
Ehud Olmert
Likud

The 1998 Jerusalem mayoral election was held on 10 November 1998, and saw the reelection of Likud incumbent Ehud Olmert.

In advance of the election, Olmert had been predicted by political prognosticators to win a convincing re-election.

1998 Jerusalem mayoral elections results
Candidate	Party	Votes	%
Ehud Olmert (incumbent)	Likud	97,171	61.00
Shimon Shetreet	One Israel	36,567	22.95
Arnan Yekutali		13,540	8.50
Naomi Chazan		6,605	4.15
Elisha Peleg		4,198	2.64
Noam Badr		1,208	0.76
???		16	0.01
Total		159,305	100

== 2003 ==
2003 Jerusalem mayoral election
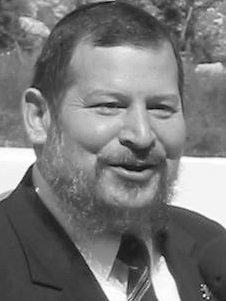

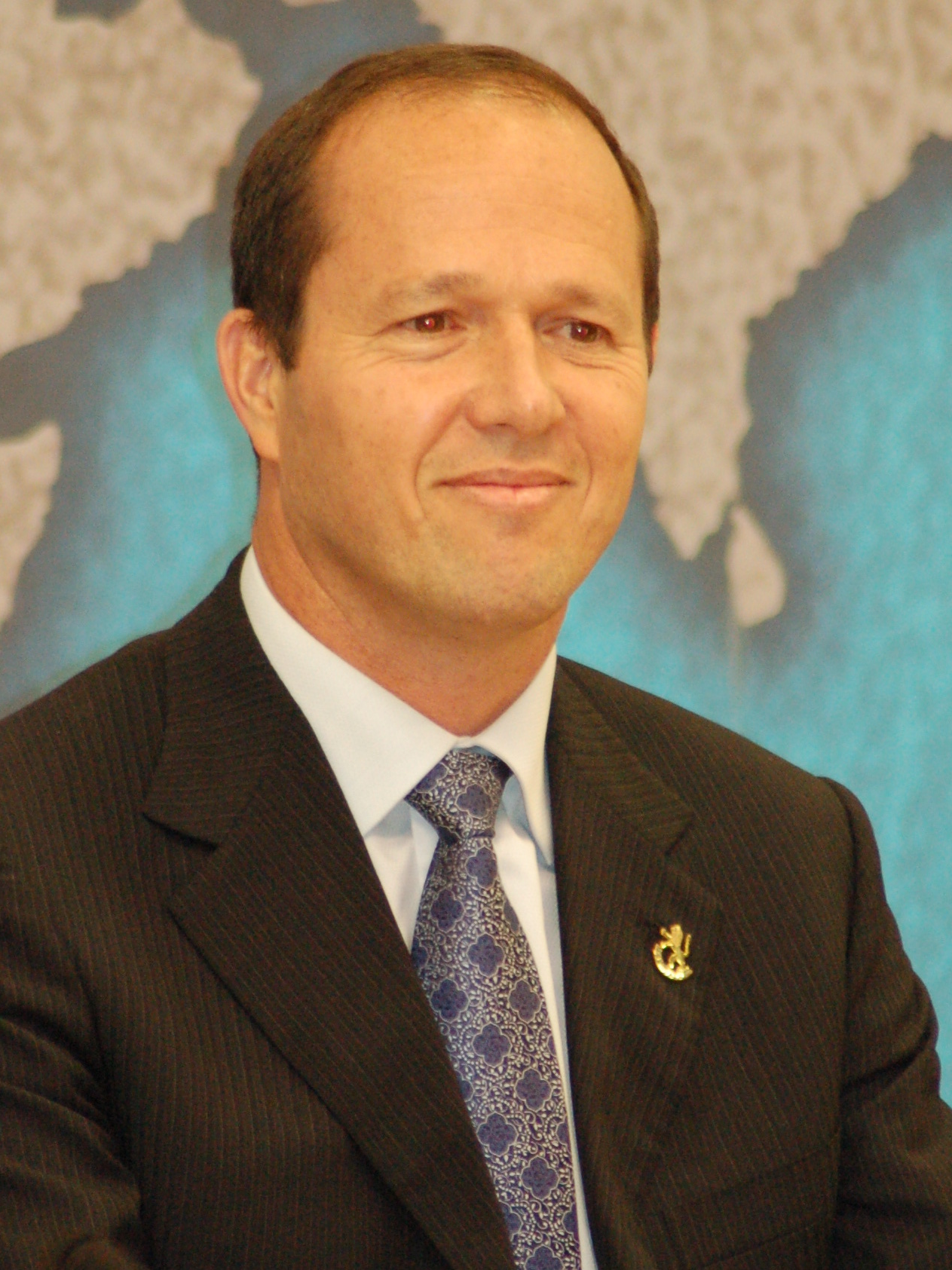
Candidate	Uri Lupolianski	Nir Barkat
Party	UTJ	Jerusalem Will Succeed
Popular vote	90,090	74,550
Percentage	51.39%	42.49%
Mayor before election
Ehud Olmert
Likud
Elected mayor
Uri Lupolianski
UTJ

The 2003 Jerusalem mayoral election saw the election of United Torah Judaism nominee Uri Lupolianski. Lupolianksi became the first Haredi to serve as mayor of Jerusalem.

Results

- Uri Lupolianski (United Torah Judaism) 51.39%
- Nir Barkat (Jerusalem Will Succeed) 42.49%
- Yigal Almedi (Likud) 3.24%

== 2008 ==
2008 Jerusalem mayoral election
- 11 November 2008
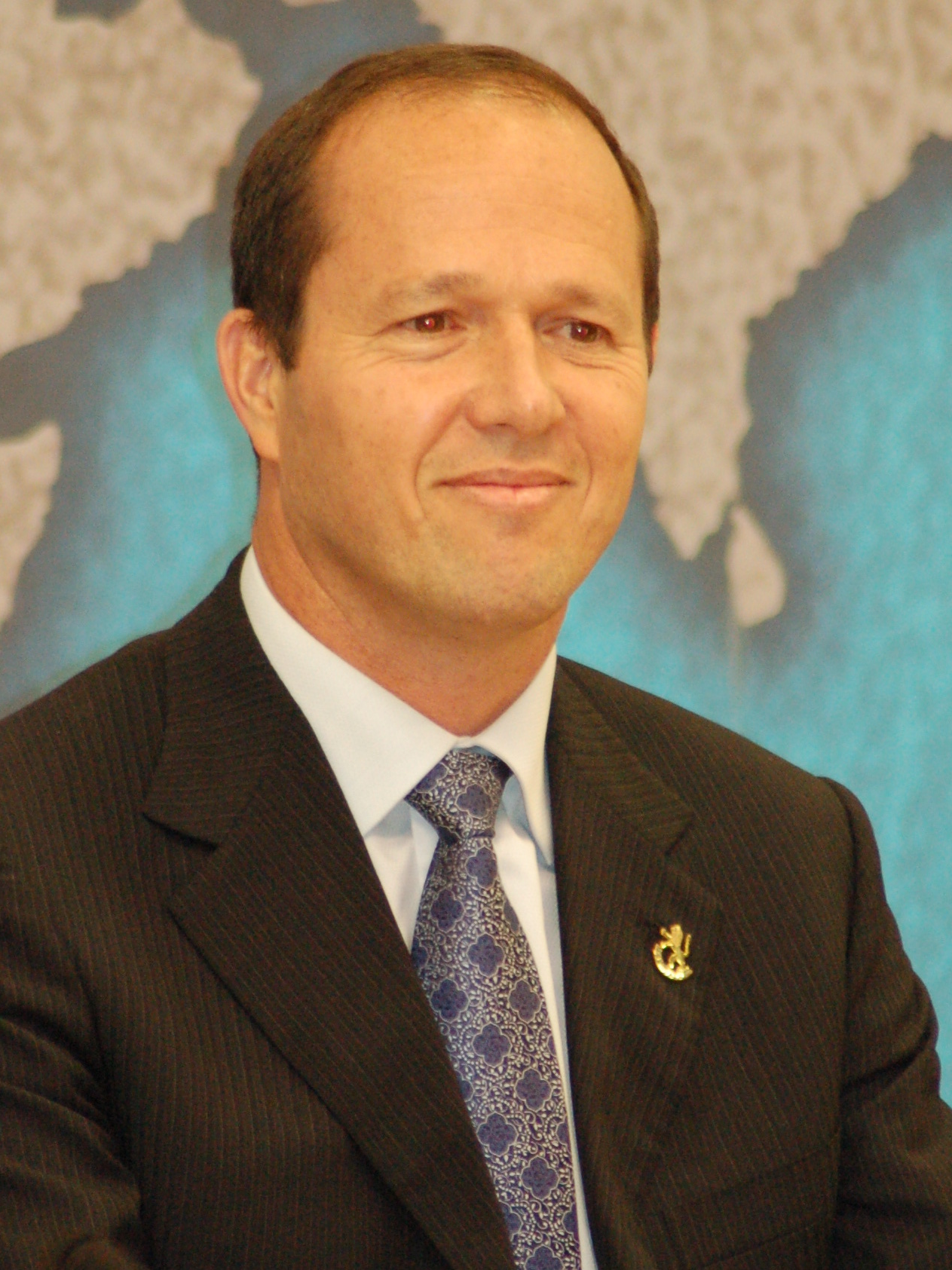

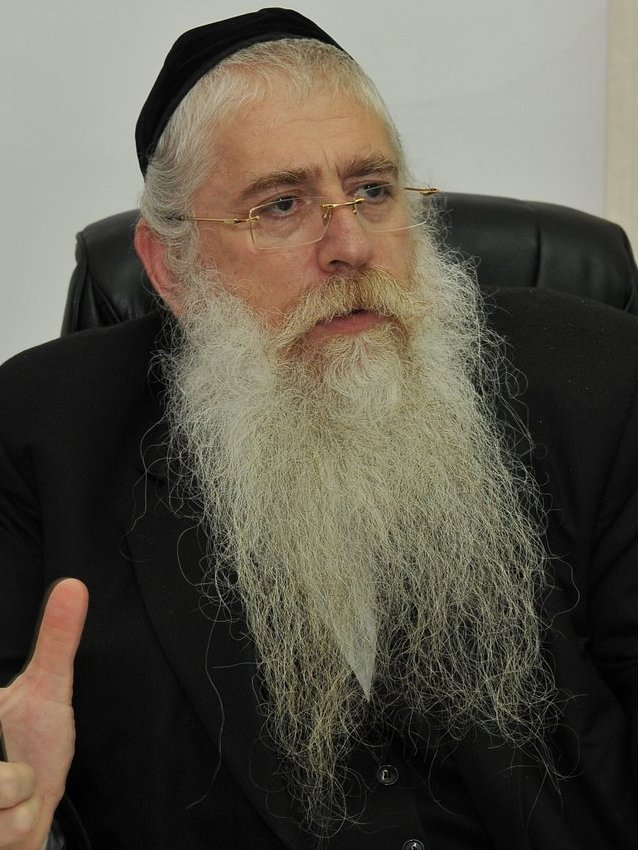
Candidate	Nir Barkat	Meir Porush
Party	Jerusalem Will Succeed	UTJ
Popular vote	116,947	94,456
Percentage	54.64%	44.13%
Mayor before election
Uri Lupolianski
UTJ
Elected mayor
Nir Barkat
Independent

The 2008 Jerusalem mayoral election was held on 11 November 2008, and saw the election of Nir Barkat.

=== Candidates ===
- Nir Barkat (Jerusalem Will Succeed), businessman
- Dan Biron (Ale Yarok)
- Arcadi Gaydamak (Social Justice), billionaire businessman and chairman of Social Justice
- Meir Porush (United Torah Judaism), member of the Knesset

=== Campaigning ===
Barkat and Porush were the election's front-runners.

Barkat was seen as receiving the support of the city's secular majority, which had been regarded as declining in its share of the electorate.

Porush, a Haredi, was seen as attempting to appeal to a broad swath of the electorate, including both the religious and nonreligious. He centered his candidacy on the issues of education, employment, and housing.

=== Results ===
2008 Jerusalem mayoral elections results
Candidate	Party	Votes	%
Nir Barkat	Jerusalem Will Succeed	116,947	54.64
Meir Porush	United Torah Judaism	94,456	44.13
Arcadi Gaydamak	Social Justice	7,988	3.73
Dan Biron	Ale Yarok	1,119	0.52
Turnout		214,049	43.81

== 2013 ==
2013 Jerusalem mayoral election
- 3 October 2013
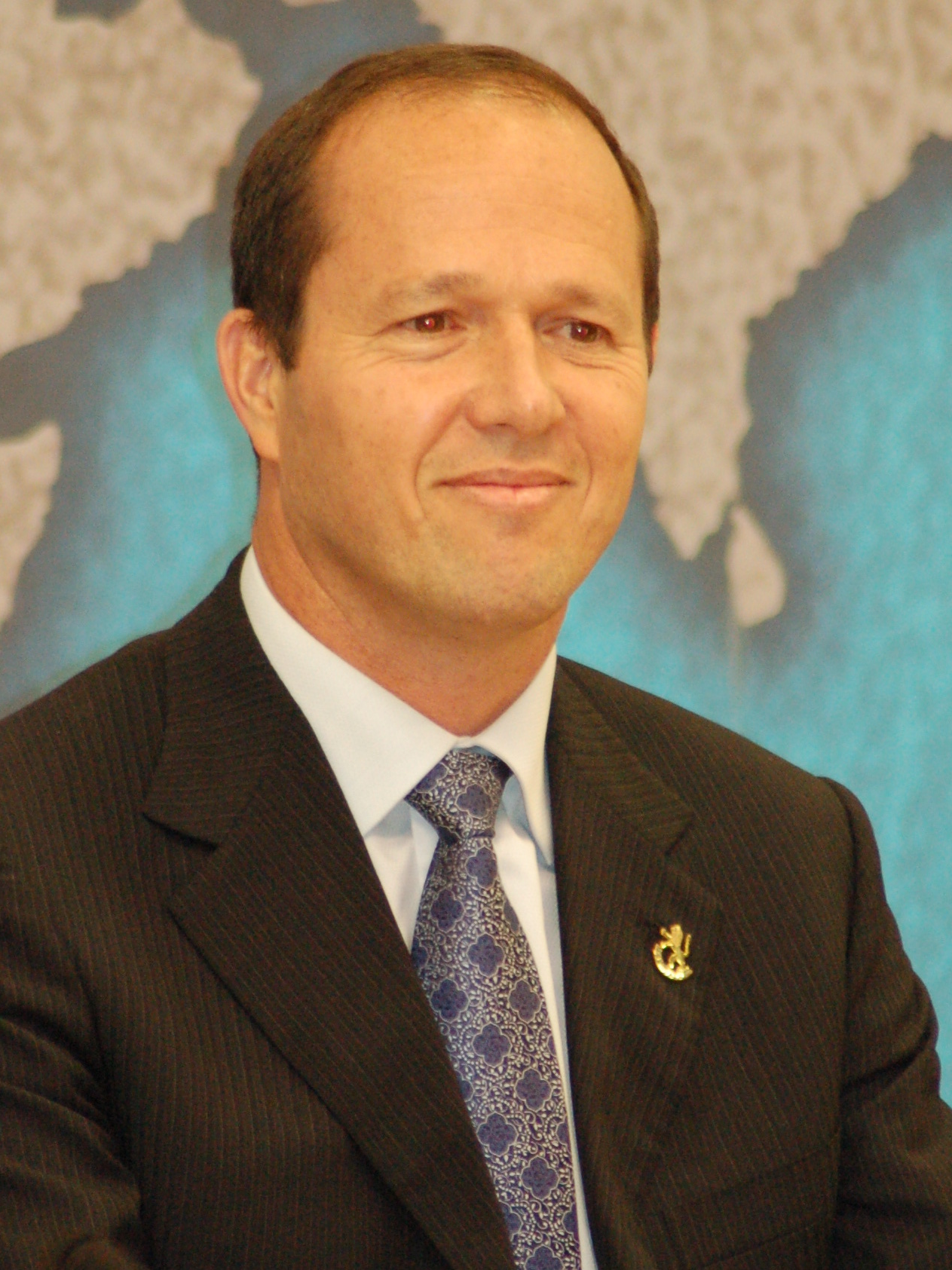

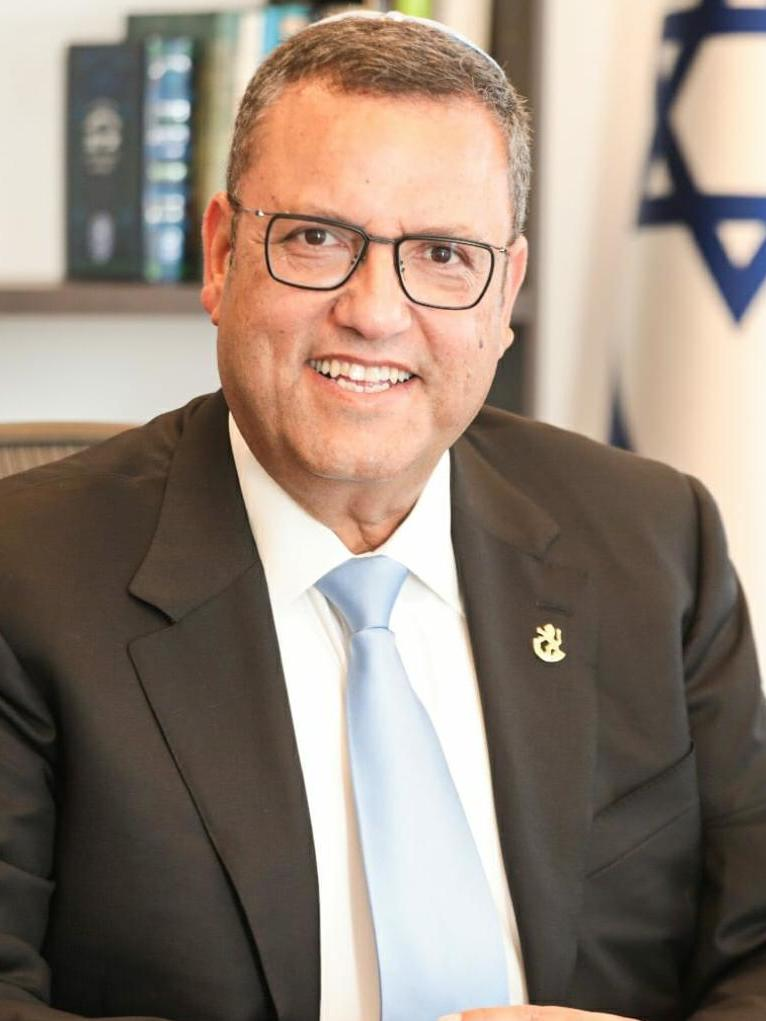
Candidate	Nir Barkat	Moshe Lion
Party	Jerusalem Will Succeed	Likud Yisrael Beiteinu
Popular vote	111,108	95,411
Percentage	51.91%	44.57%
Mayor before election
Nir Barkat
Independent
Elected mayor
Nir Barkat
Independent

The 2013 Jerusalem mayoral election was held on 2 October 2013, and saw the reelection of Nir Barkat.

2013 Jerusalem mayoral elections results
Candidate	Party	Votes	%
Nir Barkat (incumbent)	Jerusalem Will Succeed	111,108	51.91%
Moshe Lion	Likud-Yisrael Beiteinu	95,411	44.57%
Chaim Epstein	Jerusalem Faction	7,530	3.52%
Total		214,049	100

== 2018 ==
2018 Jerusalem mayoral election
- 30 October 2018 (first round); 13 November 2018 (runoff)
- Turnout: 39.86% (first round); 35% (runoff)
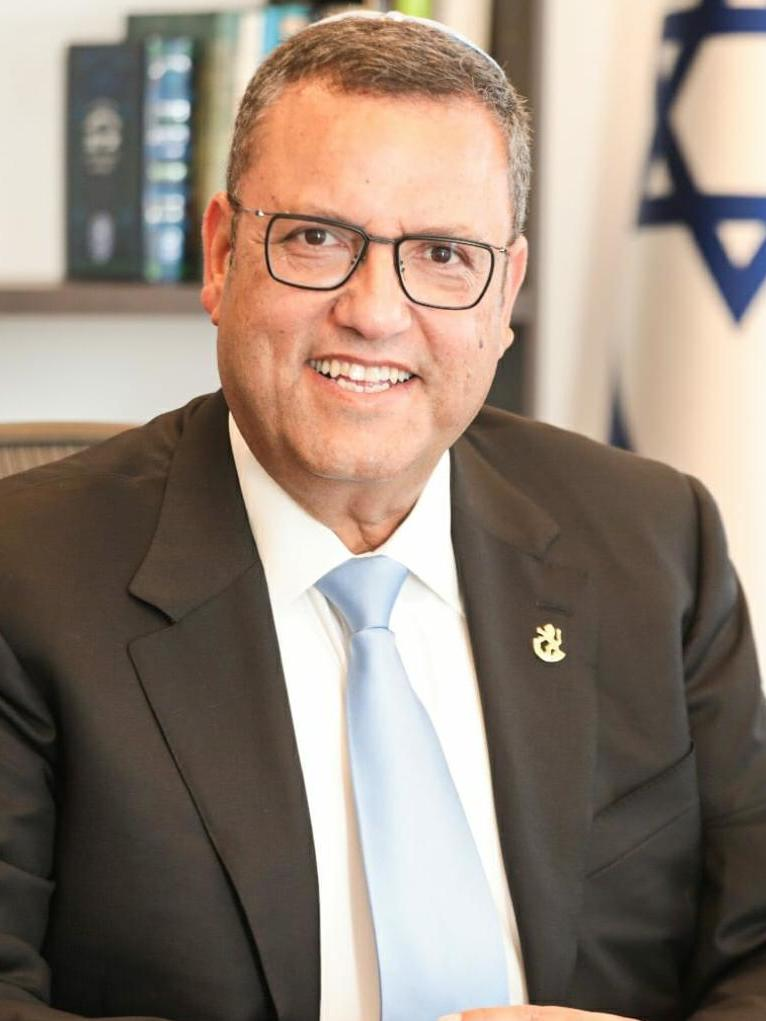

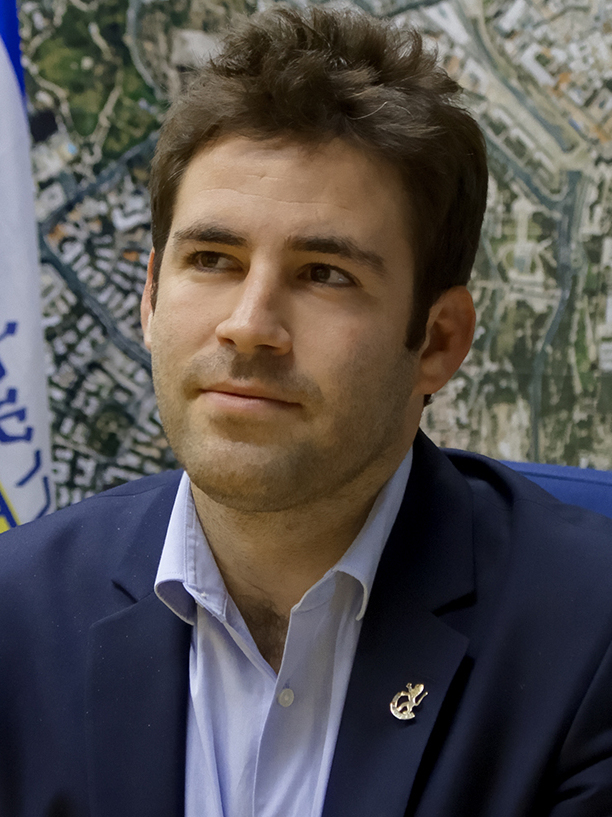

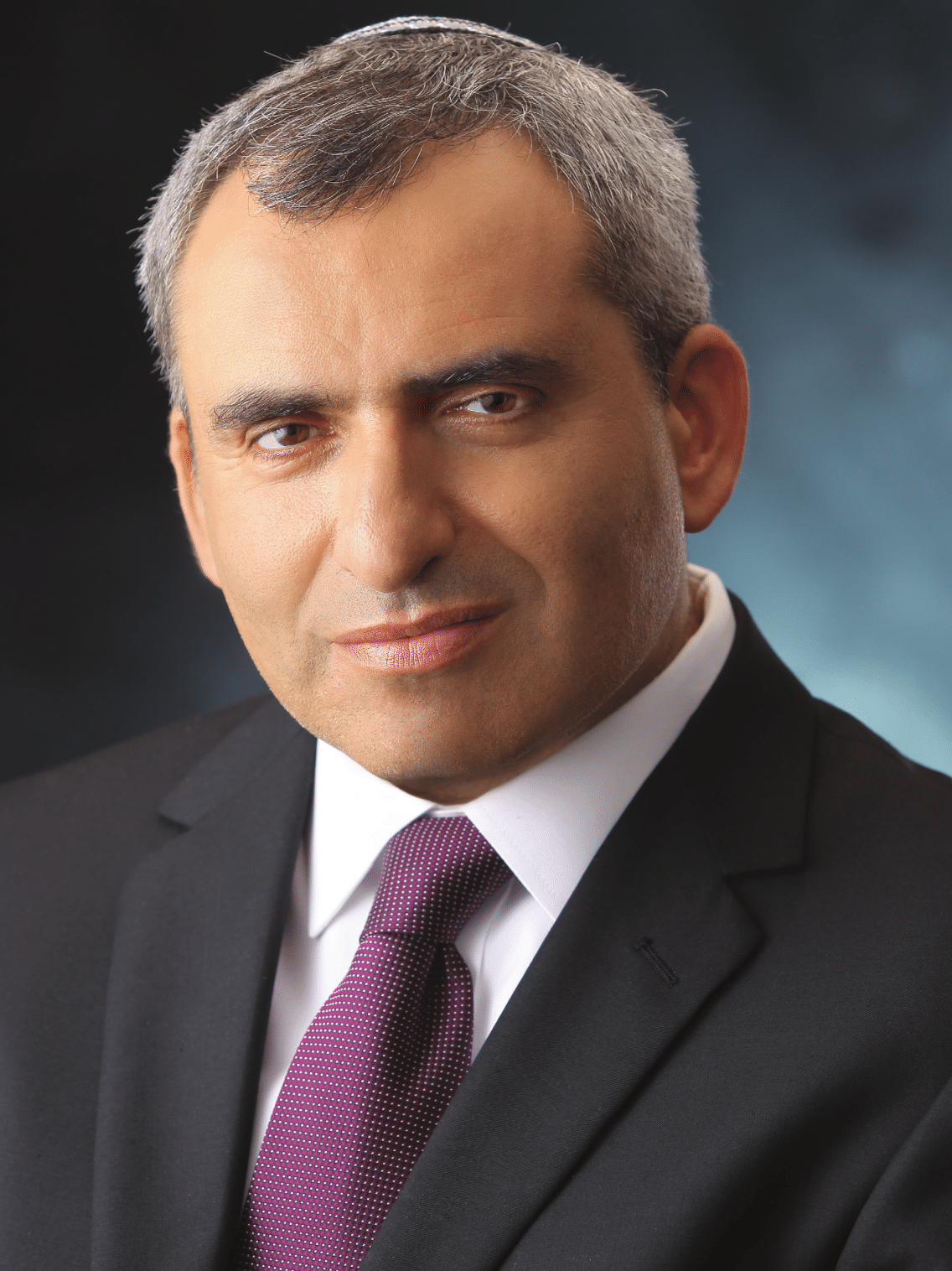

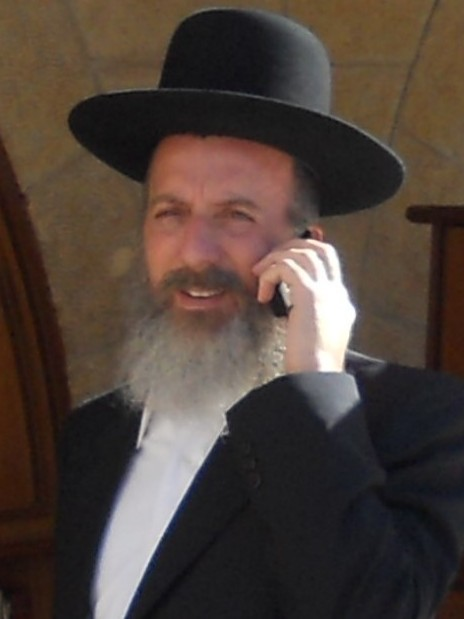
Candidate	Moshe Lion	Ofer Berkovitch
Party	Our Jerusalem	Awakening
First-round vote	81,426	73,079
First-round percentage	32.76%	29.40%
Second-round vote	112,744	108,979
Second-round percentage	50.85%	49.15%
Candidate	Ze'ev Elkin	Yossi Deutch
Party	Jerusalem Will Succeed	Agudat Yisrael
First-round vote	49,681	42,289
First-round percentage	19.99%	17.01%
Mayor before election
Nir Barkat
Independent
Elected mayor
Moshe Lion
Independent

The 2018 Jerusalem mayoral election was held on 30 October and 13 November 2018 to elect the mayor of Jerusalem. It was the election of Moshe Lion.

With no candidate in the first round meeting the vote threshold of 40% needed to avoid a runoff election, a runoff was held on 13 November. The election was won by Moshe Lion.

Incumbent mayor Nir Barkat did not seek reelection.

Ahead of the first race, Ze'ev Elkin was widely regarded to be the front-runner due to his endorsements from Prime Minister Benjamin Netanyahu and outgoing mayor Barkat. He was considered the race's front-runner. However, in a surprise, he placed third failing to advance to the general election. Lion narrowly won the runoff election against Ofer Berkovitch, with the support of the city's Haredi parties (influential in city). Lion, who in his unsuccessful 2013 campaign for mayor had run as the Likud nominee, ran as an independent in his 2018 bid. Lion was viewed in the runoff to be the candidate representing the right wing., Lion received the endorsement of outgoing mayor Barkat in the runoff, while Prime Minister Netanyahu did not endorse a candidate in the runoff. Lion was also endorsed in the runoff by the local chapters of the Likud and The Jewish Home parties, as well as several Likud party ministers.

=== Candidates ===
==== Ran ====
- Ofer Berkovitch, member of the Council of Jerusalem and former deputy mayor
- Yossi Daitsh, deputy mayor
- Ze'ev Elkin, member of the Knesset for Likud, minister of Jerusalem affairs, minister of environmental protection
- Moshe Lion, member of the Council of Jerusalem, former chairman of the Jerusalem Development Authority, candidate for mayor in 2013
- Avi Salman, former aide of Mayor Nir Barkat

==== Withdrew ====
- Rachel Azaria, member of the Knesset (endorsed Elkin)
- Chaim Epstein, member of the Council of Jerusalem

=== Results ===
First round

The results of the first round of voting in Jerusalem, with 254,326 voters participating of 638,065 eligible (a 39.86% turnout), are as follows. Of the 254,326 votes, 248,585 were valid.

Candidate	Party name		Votes	%
Moshe Lion	Our Jerusalem	ירושלים שלנו, Yerushalayim Shelanu	81,426	32.76%
Ofer Berkovitch	Awakening	התעוררות, Hit'orerut	73,079	29.40%
Ze'ev Elkin	Jerusalem Will Succeed	ירושלים תצליח, Yerushalayim Tatzli'ah	49,681	19.99%
Yossi Deutch	Agudat Yisrael	אגודת ישראל	42,289	17.01%
Avi Salman	I'm Jerusalem	אני ירושלים, Ani Yerushalayim	2,110	0.85%
Source: Ministry of the Interior

Runoff

The results of the second round of voting in Jerusalem are as follows. The voter turnout was 35%.

Candidate	Votes	%
Moshe Lion	112,744	50.85%
Ofer Berkovitch	108,979	49.15%
Source: Ministry of the Interior – provisional data

== 2024 ==
2024 Jerusalem mayoral election
- 27 February 2024
- Turnout: 33.75%
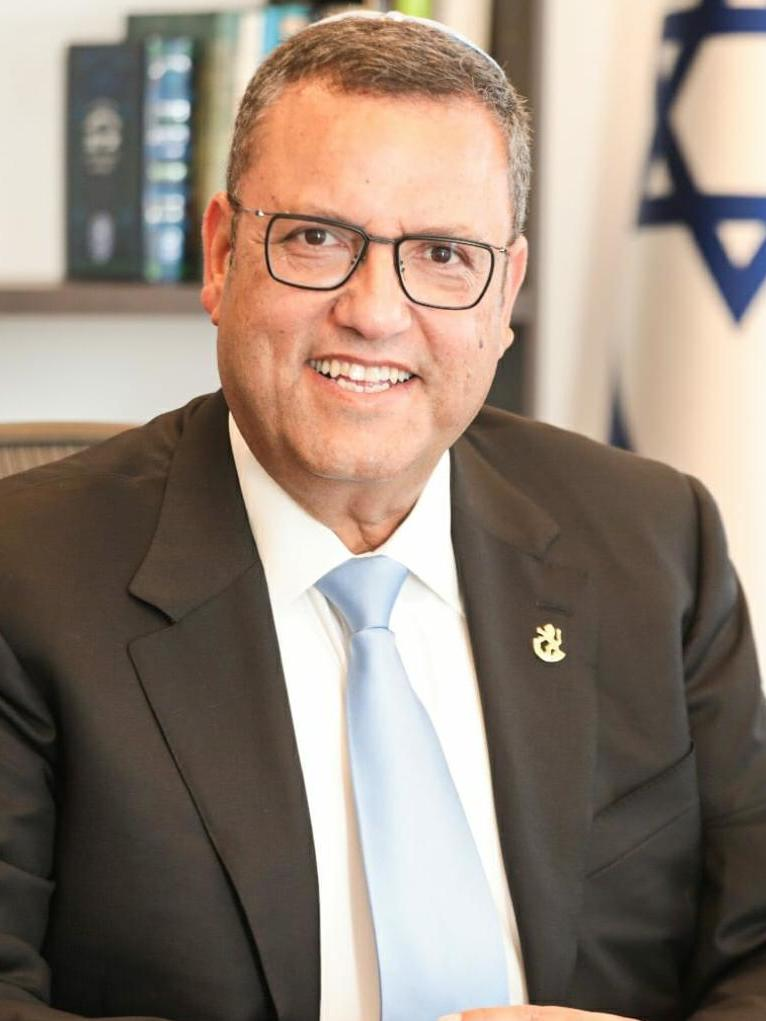

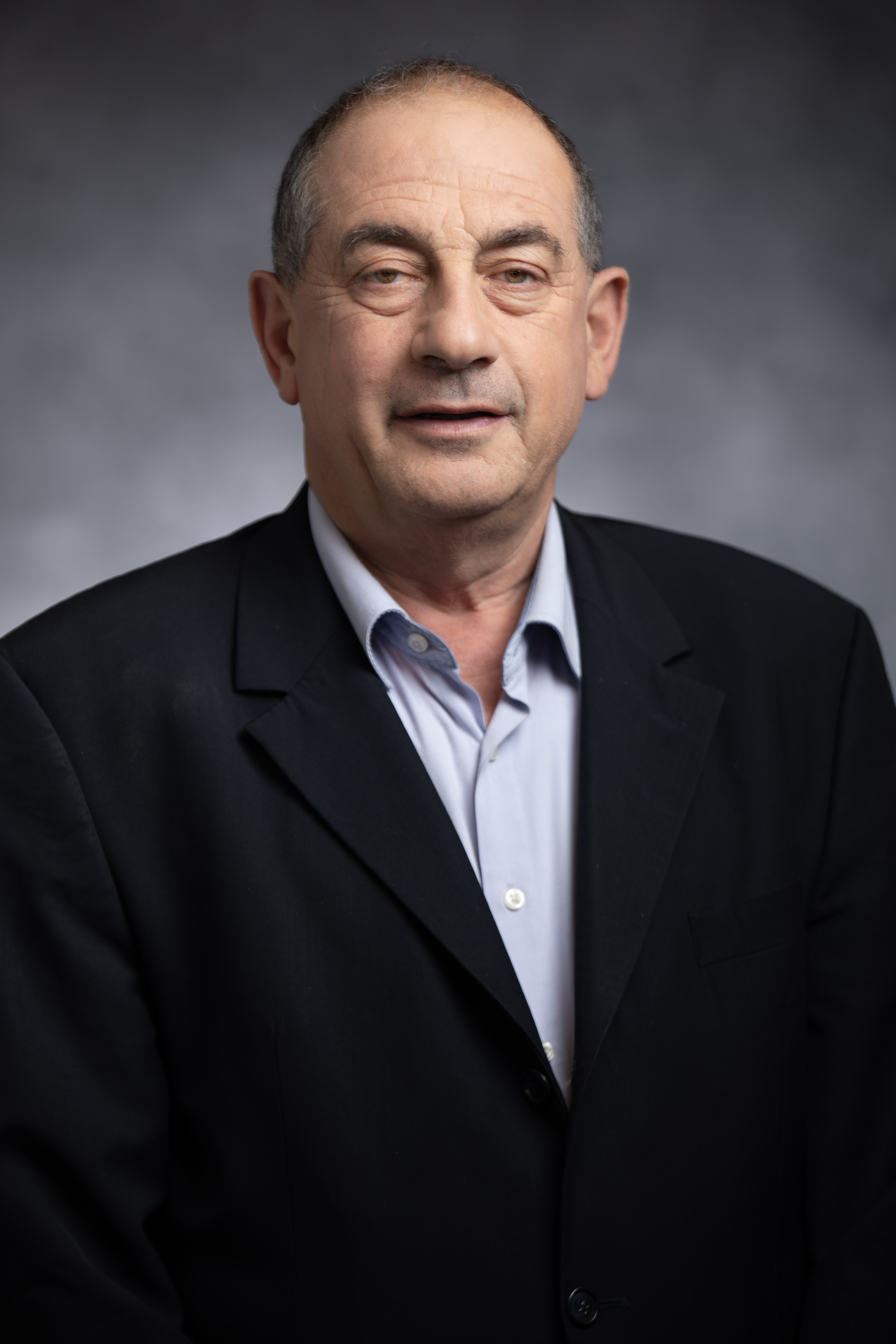
Candidate	Moshe Lion	Yosi Havilio
Party	Our Jerusalem	Jerusalem Union
Popular vote	179,285	41,871
Percentage	81.07%	18.93%
Mayor before election
Mose Lion
One Jerusalem
Elected mayor
Moshe Lion
One Jerusalem

The 2024 Jerusalem mayoral election was held on 27 February 2024 to elect the mayor of Jerusalem. Incumbent mayor Moshe Lion was handily re-elected

Candidate	Party	Votes	%
Moshe Lion	One Jerusalem	179,285	81.07
Yosi Havilio	Jerusalem Union	41,871	18.93
Total		221,156	100.00
Valid votes		221,156	94.86
Invalid/blank votes		11,990	5.14
Total votes		233,146	100.00
Registered voters/turnout		690,707	33.75
Source: Reshumot, Hol Ha'ir
