= Abdelrahman al-Dajani =

Mayor of Jerusalem (1863–1867, 1867–1869)

- عبد الرحمن الدجاني

Mayor of Jerusalem
- In office 1863–1882

Abdelrahman al-Dajani (Arabic: عبد الرحمن الدجاني) was mayor of Jerusalem from 1863 till 1882.
