= Musa Faidi al-Alami =

Mayor of Jerusalem (1879–1881)

Musa al-Alami

Mayor of Jerusalem

Personal details
- Died: 1881
- Children: Faidi al-Alami (son)

Musa al-Alami (died 1881) (Arabic: موسى العلمي) was mayor of Jerusalem in 1869, and from 1879 to 1881.

His son, Faidi al-Alami, was also mayor of the city and his grandson, another Musa al-Alami, was assistant attorney-general of Palestine under the British mandate.

The Alami family were well-educated landowners and natives of Jerusalem, who had long served as officials and qadis for the various administrations to rule Palestine.
