= Mayor of Jerusalem =

Head of the executive branch of the government of Jerusalem

Mayor of the City of Jerusalem
- Seal of the City of Jerusalem

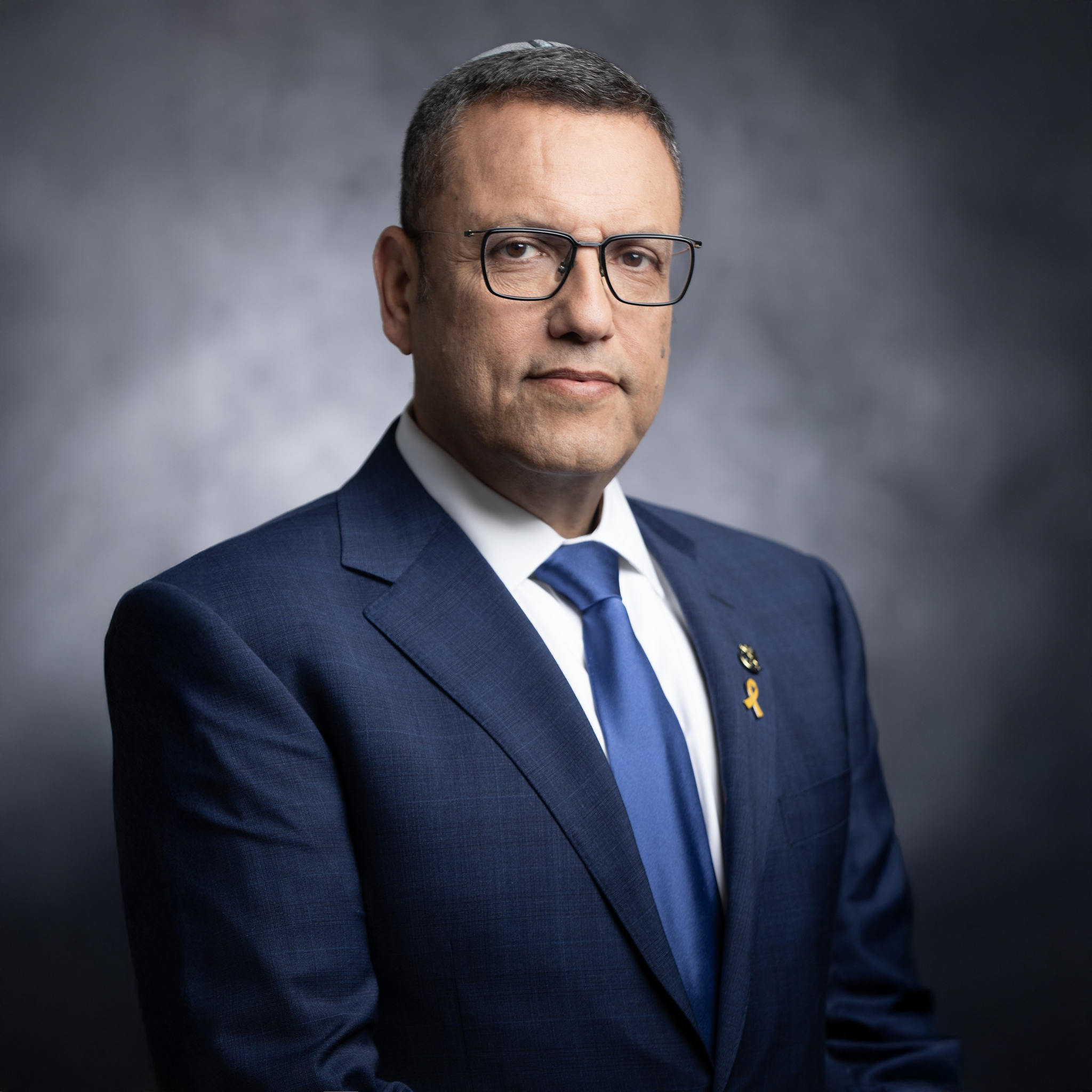
- Incumbent; Moshe Lion since 4 December 2018
- Residence: 1 Safra Square, Jerusalem
- Term length: 5 years
- Formation: 1867
- Website: Office of the Mayor

The mayor of the City of Jerusalem is head of the executive branch of the political system in Jerusalem. The mayor's office administers all city services, public property, most public agencies, and enforces all city and state laws within Jerusalem. The term of office is five years.

The mayor's office is located in Safra Square; it has jurisdiction over all the city's neighborhoods. The mayor appoints many officials, including deputy mayors and city departments directors.

== History ==
The Jerusalem City Council was established in 1863 during the rule of the Ottoman Empire. From 1948 to 1967 two municipalities operated in the city: an Israeli municipality provided services to the western neighborhoods of the city and a Jordanian municipality to its eastern parts.

By 1840, the Jewish community constituted the largest single religious group in the city. From the 1880s onward, the Jews constituted the majority within the city. However, it was only in 1937, under the British Mandate, that the first Jewish mayor was appointed. Since 1948 every mayor has been Jewish.

Prior to a 1975 national law change, mayors were chosen by the city council (which was elected in a closed list proportional representation system).

Since 1975 law change, mayors have been directly elected in a two round system. Under this system, if no candidate receives at least 40% of the vote in the first round, a runoff election is held between the top-two finishers. The first municipal election to be held under the new law of direct elections for mayor was held in 1978.

== List of mayors (1845–present) ==
=== Ottoman Empire (1845–1920) ===
	Mayor	Term start	Term end
1	Kıbrıslı Mehmed Emin Pasha (Note: His first wife, Melek Hanım wrote a book about life in Jerusalem)	1845	1847
2	Ahmad Agha Duzdar Al-Asali (Note: Official title: Governor of Jerusalem)	1848	1863
3	Abdelrahman al-Dajani	1863	1867
4	Rafadulo Astiriyadis Effendi (acting)	1867	
5	Abdelrahman al-Dajani	1867	1869
6	Mūsā Faydī al-'Alamī	1869	
7	Abd al-Salām Paşa al Ḥusaynī	1869	1870
8	Yousef Al-Khalidi	1870	1876
9	Abd al-Qādir al-Khalīlī Abū l-Hudā / 'Umar 'Abd al-Salām Paşa al Ḥusaynī / Salīm Shākir al-Ḥusaynī. (Note: Triumvirate)	1876	1877
10	Shaḥāda Faydallāh al-'Alamī	1877	
11	Rafadulo Astiriyadis Effendi (acting)	1877	1878
12	Yousef Al-Khalidi	1878	1879
13	Mūsā Faydī al-'Alamī	1879	1881
14	Ḥusayn Salīm Paşa al Ḥusaynī	1882	1897
15	Yaseen al-Khalidi	1897	1899
16	Yousef Al-Khalidi (Note: According to Bernard Wasserstein (1977): "MUSA AL-'ALAMI was born in Jerusalem in 1897. His father, Faidi. Effendi al-'Alami, was a large landowner, Mayor of Jerusalem (1906–9)")	1899	1906
17	Faidi al-Alami	1906	1909
18	Hussein al-Husayni	1909	1917
19	Aref al-Dajani	1917	1918
20	Musa Kazim al-Husayni	1918	1920

=== Mandatory Palestine (1920–1948) ===
	Mayor	Term start	Term end	Party
21	Raghib al-Nashashibi	1920	1935	National Defence Party
22	Husayn al-Khalidi	1935	1937	Reform Party
23	Daniel Auster	1937	1938	General Zionists
24	Mustafa al-Khalidi	1938	1944†	National Defence Party
(23)	Daniel Auster (Note: Acting Mayor after Mustafa al-Khalidi's death.)	1944	1945	General Zionists
-	City Council committee	1945	1948	Various

=== Divided Jerusalem (1948–1967) ===
==== Mayors of West Jerusalem (Israel) ====
	Mayor of Jerusalem	Took office	Left office	Party	Coalition
1	Daniel Auster	1948	1950	General Zionists	General Zionists
2	Zalman Shragai	10 January 1951	17 August 1952	Hapoel HaMizrachi	United Religious Front
3	Yitzhak Kariv	25 September 1952	April 1955	Mizrachi	United Religious Front
4	Gershon Agron	7 September 1955	1 November 1959	Mapai	Mapai – Ahdut HaAvoda
5	Mordechai Ish-Shalom	1 November 1959	29 November 1965	Mapai	Mapai – Ahdut HaAvoda
6	Teddy Kollek	29 November 1965	29 June 1967	Rafi	Alignment

==== Mayors of East Jerusalem (Jordanian administration of the West Bank) ====
	Mayor of East Jerusalem	Took office	Left office	Party
1	Anwar Khatib	1948	1950	Independent
2	Aref al-Aref	1950	1951	Independent
3	Hannah Atallah	1951	12 March 1952	Independent
4	Omar Wa'ari	12 March 1952	1955	Independent
-	City Council committee	1955	1957	Independents
5	Ruhi al-Khatib	1957	29 June 1967	Independent

=== Reunited Jerusalem (1967–present) ===
	Mayor of Jerusalem	Took office	Left office	Party	Coalition
24	Teddy Kollek	29 June 1967	2 November 1993	Rafi (1967-1968); Labor (from 1968)	Alignment; 1967 – 1969
24	Teddy Kollek	29 June 1967	2 November 1993	Rafi (1967-1968); Labor (from 1968)	Labor – Alignment – Mapam; 1969 – 1993
25	Ehud Olmert	2 November 1993	16 February 2003	Likud	Likud
26	Uri Lupolianski	16 February 2003	11 November 2008	Degel HaTorah	United Torah Judaism
27	Nir Barkat	11 November 2008	4 December 2018	Independent	Likud – Independents
28	Moshe Lion	4 December 2018	Incumbent	Independent	Independent

=== Titular Mayors of East Jerusalem (1967–present) ===
The office of Mayor of East Jerusalem was dissolved in 1967 after the Six-Day War and it has been titular since then.

	Titular Mayor of East Jerusalem	Took office	Left office	Party
-	Ruhi al-Khatib	29 June 1967	5 July 1994†	Independent
-	Amin al-Majaj	1994	2 January 1999†	Independent
-	Zaki al-Ghul	1999	28 April 2019†	Independent

== See also ==
- Mutasarrıfs of Jerusalem
- Mayoral elections in Jerusalem
- History of Jerusalem
- List of people from Jerusalem
- Timeline of Jerusalem
