= Shimon Shetreet =

Israeli politician (born 1946)

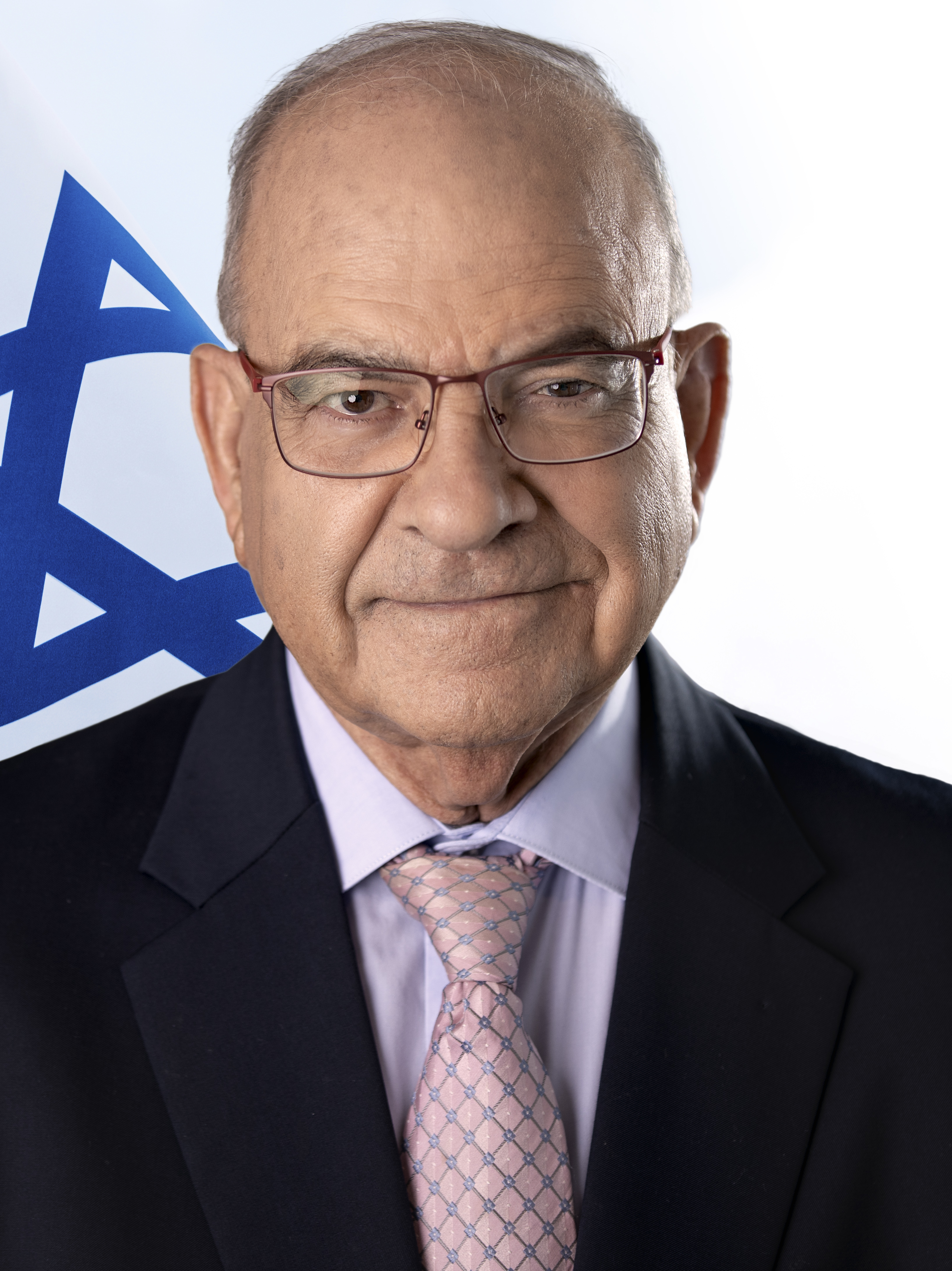
- Shetreet in 2020

Ministerial roles
- 1992–1993: Minister of Science & Technology
- 1992–1995: Minister of Economics & Planning
- 1995–1996: Minister of Religious Affairs

Faction represented in the Knesset
- 1988–1991: Alignment
- 1991–1996: Labor Party

Personal details
- Born: 1 March 1946 (age 80) Erfoud, Morocco

Professor Shimon Shetreet (Hebrew: שמעון שטרית; born 1 March 1946) is an Israeli former politician who held several ministerial portfolios between 1992 and 1996. He is currently the Greenblatt Chair of Public and International Law at the Hebrew University of Jerusalem.

== Early life ==
Born in Erfoud in Morocco, Shetreet's family emigrated to Israel in 1949 when he was three years old. He attended a religious elementary school before studying at a yeshiva, winning the International Bible Contest at the age of 13. He went on to study law at the Hebrew University of Jerusalem, gaining a LLB in 1968 and LLM in 1970. He then went on to the University of Chicago, where he gained a LLD in 1973.

== Legal career ==
Shetreet began working as a clerk to Supreme Court judge Alfred Witkon in 1967, and was admitted to the Bar Association in 1969. In 1980 he was a member of the commission on the Israeli Court System, and was involved in founding the Public Law Association in 1987.

== Political career ==
In 1988 Shetreet was elected to the Knesset on the Alignment list. After being re-elected in 1992 (by which time the Alignment had merged into the Labor Party), Shetreet was appointed Minister of Economics and Planning and Minister of Science and Technology in Yitzhak Rabin's government. He lost the latter portfolio in June 1993 when it was given to Shulamit Aloni, but also became Minister of Religious Affairs in February 1992. When Shimon Peres formed a new government following the assassination of Rabin, he remained Minister of Religious Affairs, but lost the Economics and Planning portfolio.

In the 1996 elections Shetreet lost his seat and his place in the cabinet. He was the One Israel candidate in the 1998 Jerusalem mayoral election, but lost to Ehud Olmert, finishing second with 23% of the vote. In 1999 he was chosen to be deputy mayor of Jerusalem, a post he held until 2003.

On 7 September 2020 Shetreet announced that he would run in the 2021 presidential election. However, he failed to receive enough nominations.

== Academic career ==
Shetreet returned to the Hebrew University to work as a professor of law. He currently heads the Sacher Institute of Legislative Research and Comparative Law, as well as holding the Greenblatt chair. He has also served as a visiting professor at the Case Western Reserve University School of Law, Tulane University and the University of San Diego.
