= Faidi al-Alami =

Mayor of Jerusalem (1906–1909)

- فيضي العلمي
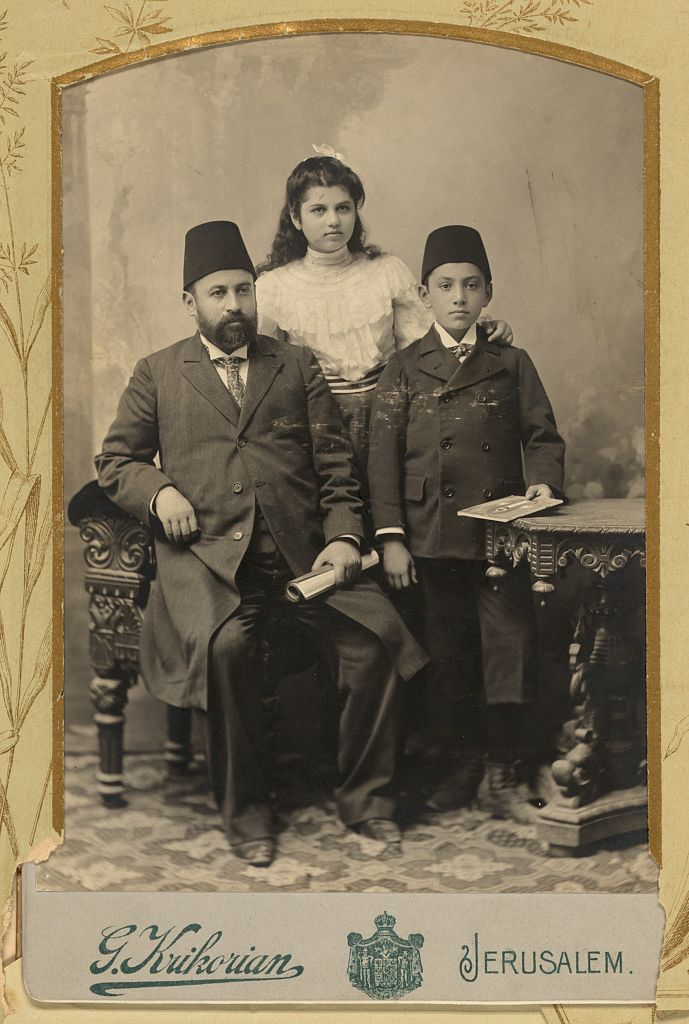
- Faidi al-Alami, in Jerusalem, with his two children, Na'amite and Musa

Mayor of Jerusalem
- In office 1906–1909
- Preceded by: Musa Kazim al-Husayni
- Succeeded by: Hussein al-Husayni

Representative of Jerusalem in Ottoman Parliament
- In office 1914–?

Personal details
- Children: Musa al-Alami (son)
- Parent: Musa al-Alami (father)

Faidi/Fidi/Fedi/Faydi Effendi el/al-'Alami (1865 or 1881 – 1924; Arabic: فيضي العلمي) was Mayor of Jerusalem from 1906 to 1909. Among his legacies was having helped improve the city and expand municipal services leading to an increase in construction of Christian institutions and Jewish neighborhoods outside of the Old City.

== Career ==
Before serving as Mayor, al-Alami was a tax official for the district authority. then a member of the judicial committee that worked with the qadi, and then he was appointed, in 1902, as district commissioner/director/officer of the Bethlehem subdistrict, thereafter serving in an elected role on the Jerusalem municipal council.

After serving as Mayor, he was appointed to the administrative council of Jerusalem. From 1914 to 1918, he was elected as one of three representatives of the sanjak of Jerusalem in the Ottoman Chamber of Deputies.

He also compiled and published a concordance of the Qur'an.

== Family background and personal life ==
His father was Musa 'Alami, who previously served as Jerusalem mayor, during the 1870s. He was married to Zuleikha al-Ansari, with whom he had two children: a son Musa/Mousa Bey (who was assistant attorney-general of Palestine under the British mandate) and a daughter Na'mati/Nai'mati/Na'amite/Ni'mati (who married Jamal al-Husseini).

For many years, Faidi al-Alami was the head of the 'Alami extended family, managing its extensive properties and endowments. The Alamis were among "the most prominent landowning families from Jerusalem."

== See also ==
- Sharafat, East Jerusalem
