= Uri Lupolianski =

Israeli politician (1951–2026)

- אורי לופוליאנסקי
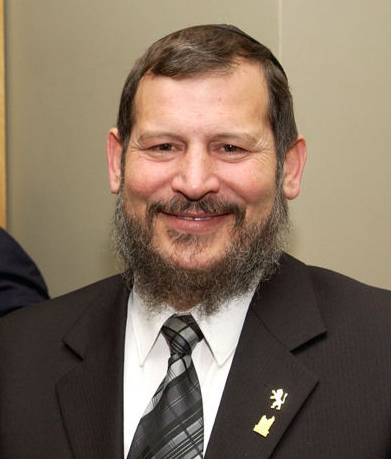
- Lupolianski in 2003

Mayor of Jerusalem
- In office 16 February 2003 – 11 November 2008
- Preceded by: Ehud Olmert
- Succeeded by: Nir Barkat

Personal details
- Born: 29 August 1951 Haifa, Israel
- Died: 7 January 2026 (aged 74) Jerusalem, Israel
- Party: Degel HaTorah
- Spouse: Michal Schneller
- Children: 12

Uri Lupolianski (Hebrew: אורי לופוליאנסקי; 29 August 1951 – 7 January 2026) was an Israeli politician who served as the mayor of Jerusalem from 2003 to 2008 and was the founder of Yad Sarah.

== Background ==
Born 29 August 1951 in Haifa, Israel, Lupolianski studied at the Yavne School in Haifa and then attended Yeshivat Hanegev and Yeshivat Torah Ore. He served in the Israel Defense Forces as a paramedic and worked as a teacher at a religious school in Jerusalem. Lupolianski was married to Michal Lupolianski (Schneller), granddaughter of Rabbi Isaac Breuer. They had 12 children.

Lupolianski died on 7 January 2026, at the age of 74.

== Yad Sarah ==
In 1976, Lupolianski founded the Yad Sarah organization to help the elderly and disabled. The organization is named after his Polish grandmother, who was killed in the Holocaust. It lends out medical equipment and supplies a variety of services to the sick, elderly and lonely. Yad Sarah has a network of 6,000 volunteers working out of 96 branches, and serves all sectors of the population.

== Political career ==
Lupolianski was Deputy Mayor, chairperson of the Planning and Building Committee and responsible for the Family Services and Community portfolio. He was a member of the National Building and Planning Committee and the Committee for the Development of Holy Places. Lupolianski was a member of the Degel Hatorah party which ran for elections together with Agudat Yisrael in a united party called United Torah Judaism. In the 2003 Jerusalem mayoral election, Lupolianski ran under the United Torah Judaism ticket. This was part of a rotation deal which stated that in the next election, the ticket would nominate a candidate from Agudat Yisrael. He was elected on 6 June 2003, after serving on the Jerusalem City Council from 1989.

== Mayoral term ==
To attract students to Jerusalem's institutions of higher education, Lupolianski inaugurated the "Lupolianski Package" which offers special tuition and housing subsidies to university students renting apartments in the city center. Hi-tech workers who choose to live and work in Jerusalem are also eligible for a monthly grant to cover part of their living expenses. Lupolianski was accused of preferring Jews for civil service over Arabs, and of basing municipal decisions on his religious views. During his tenure as mayor, Lupolianski clashed with the Israeli gay and lesbian community for trying to stop or change the venue of their annual Gay pride parade in Jerusalem.

== Awards ==
Before becoming mayor, Lupolianski won the President's Volunteer Prize, the Knesset Speaker's Award and the Kaplan Prize for Efficiency. In 1994, he accepted the Israel Prize on behalf of Yad Sarah.

== Holyland case ==
On 5 January 2011, he was indicted with 17 others for allegedly giving or receiving bribes to advance various real estate ventures, particularly the Holyland development. However, unlike the others in the case, Lupolianski never received any money himself. Rather, the money was sent to a Jerusalem charity that assists poor people in the city. In March 2014, he was found guilty of corruption.
