= Nir Barkat =

Israeli businessman and politician (born 1959)

- ניר ברקת
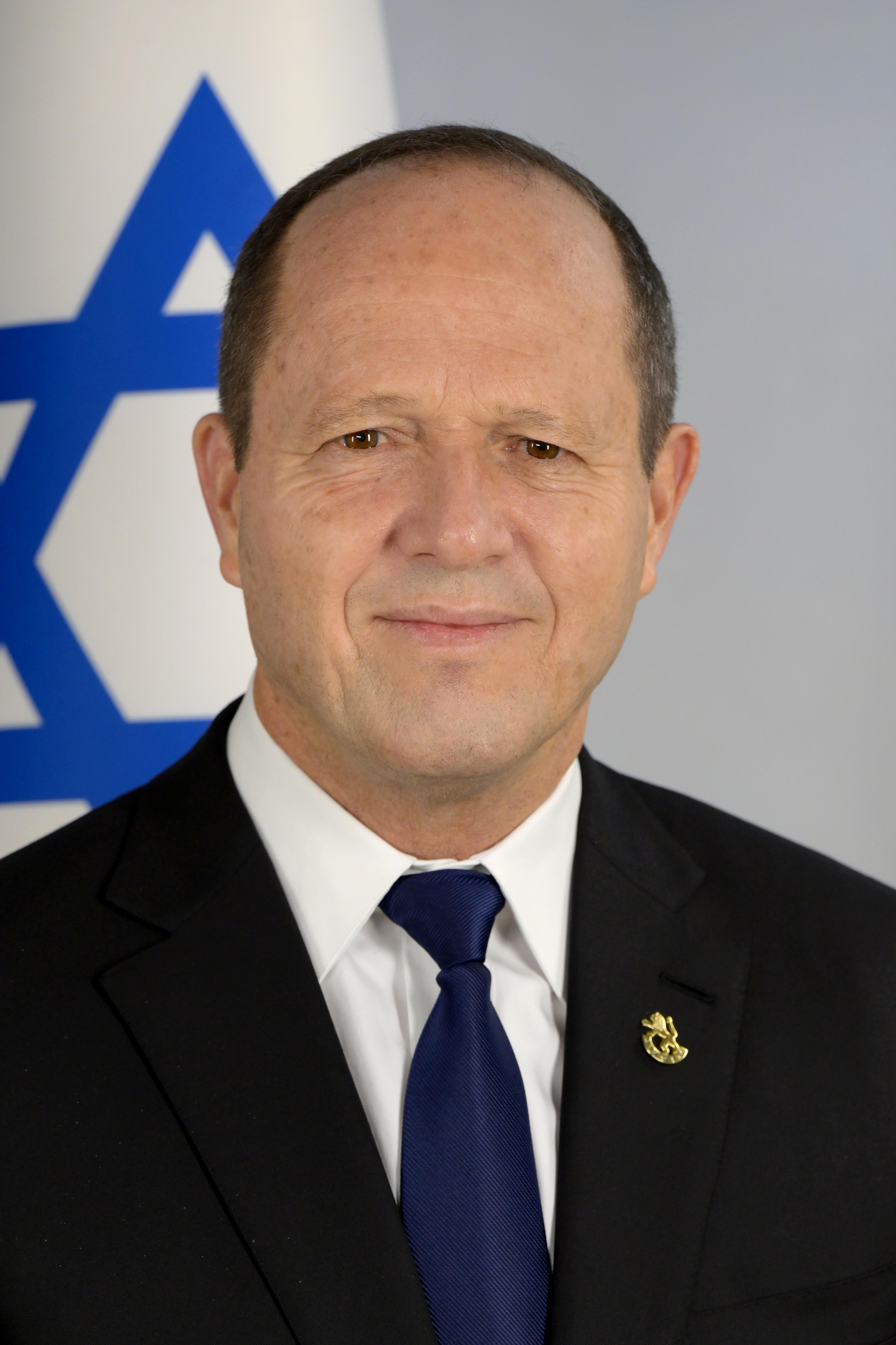
- Official portrait, 2023

Mayor of Jerusalem
- In office 11 November 2008 – 4 December 2018
- Preceded by: Uri Lupolianski
- Succeeded by: Moshe Lion

Ministerial roles
- 2023–: Minister of Economy and Industry

Faction represented in the Knesset
- 2019–: Likud

Personal details
- Born: 19 October 1959 (age 67) Jerusalem, Israel
- Party: Likud (since 2019)
- Other political affiliations: Jerusalem will Succeed (2003-2019)
- Spouse: Beverly Barkat
- Children: 3
- Education: Hebrew University of Jerusalem

Military service
- Branch/service: Israel Defense Forces
- Years of service: 1977–1983
- Rank: Rav séren (Major)
- Unit: 98th Paratroopers Division
- Battles/wars: 1982 Lebanon War

Nir Barkat (Hebrew: נִיר בַּרְקָת; born 19 October 1959) is an Israeli businessman and politician, currently serving as Minister of Economy. He previously served as mayor of Jerusalem from 2008 to 2018.

== Biography ==
Nir Barkat was born and raised in Jerusalem. His father, Zalman, was a physics professor at the Hebrew University, and his mother was a folk dancing instructor. His grandparents immigrated from Poland and Russia.

Barkat joined the 98th Paratroopers Division of the Israel Defense Forces in 1977 and served for six years, including reserve duty, reaching the rank of major. Barkat was wounded in combat in Lebanon, during Operation Movil. He earned a BA in computer science from the Hebrew University of Jerusalem, and lives in the Jerusalem neighborhood of Beit HaKerem with his wife, Beverly. They have three daughters.

== Business career ==
=== High-Tech Ventures ===
Barkat started his career in the high-tech industry by founding a software company called BRM in 1988, which specialized in antivirus software. Later, the company became an incubator venture firm that invested in several companies such as Check Point and Backweb. He later helped found the social investment company IVN, Israel Venture Network. In 2007, Barkat took part in the Israeli version of Dragons' Den, the venture-capitalist television program, which consists of entrepreneurs pitching their ideas in order to secure investment from business experts.

=== Personal wealth ===
According to Forbes in 2013, Barkat's net worth was estimated at NIS 450 million (about $122 million), more than the combined value of the next three politicians on the list, making him the wealthiest Israeli politician. As mayor, he did not take a salary from the city of Jerusalem.

In 2021, Barkat's name was included among 565 Israelis whose names were included in the Pandora Papers. Shomrim.news, the Israeli partner in the investigation, reported that Barkat had holdings in eToro through structures connected to the British Virgin Islands, while most of eToro's operations were in Israel. According to Shomrim, documents showed that while Barkat served as mayor of Jerusalem and had said that his business holdings were held in a blind trust, he continued to directly own shares until his election to the Knesset in 2019. Shomrim also reported that, after entering the Knesset, Barkat transferred shares to his brother Eli Barkat, despite Knesset Ethics Committee guidance requiring a public trust company or a non-relative in such arrangements. Barkat's office said that he had transferred management of his business affairs to his brother when he entered public life, that he had submitted blind trust documents and a capital declaration to the Knesset Ethics Committee, and that he paid taxes in Israel. It described the investigation as politically motivated.

In 2023, after Barkat became minister of economy, Shomrim reported that he remained a stakeholder in a network of companies registered in Israel, the United States, Luxembourg, the British Virgin Islands and other jurisdictions, and said this raised conflict-of-interest concerns under rules applying to ministers. The report said that Barkat had not signed a conflict-of-interest arrangement seven months after his appointment and that ministerial rules did not permit a blind trust controlled by a first-degree relative. Barkat's office said after publication that he acted as required by law and consulted the relevant authorities.

== Political career ==
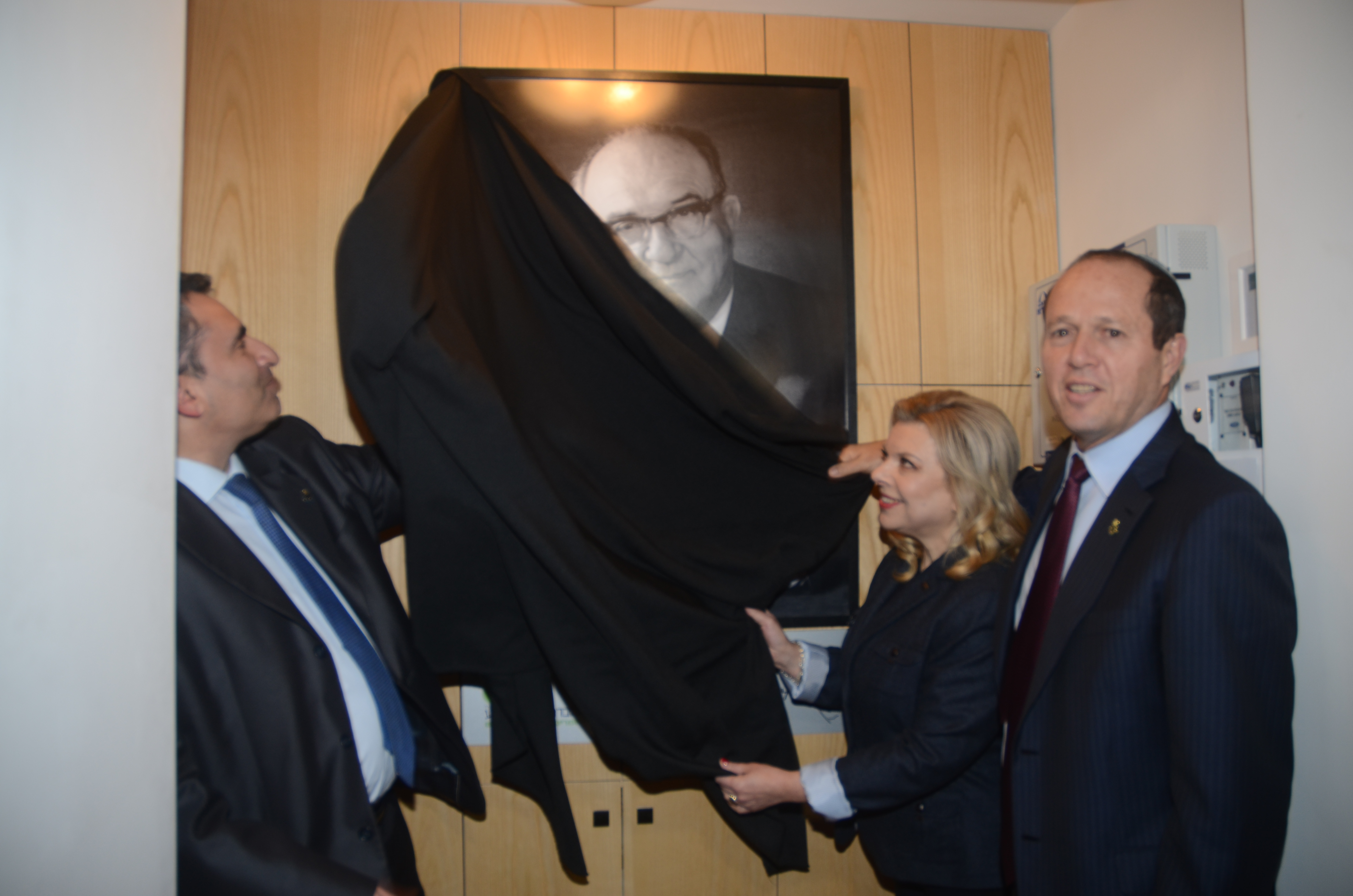
Nir Barkat, Sara Netanyahu and Ze'ev Elkin at the opening of Yad Levi Eshkol's visitors' center in Jerusalem

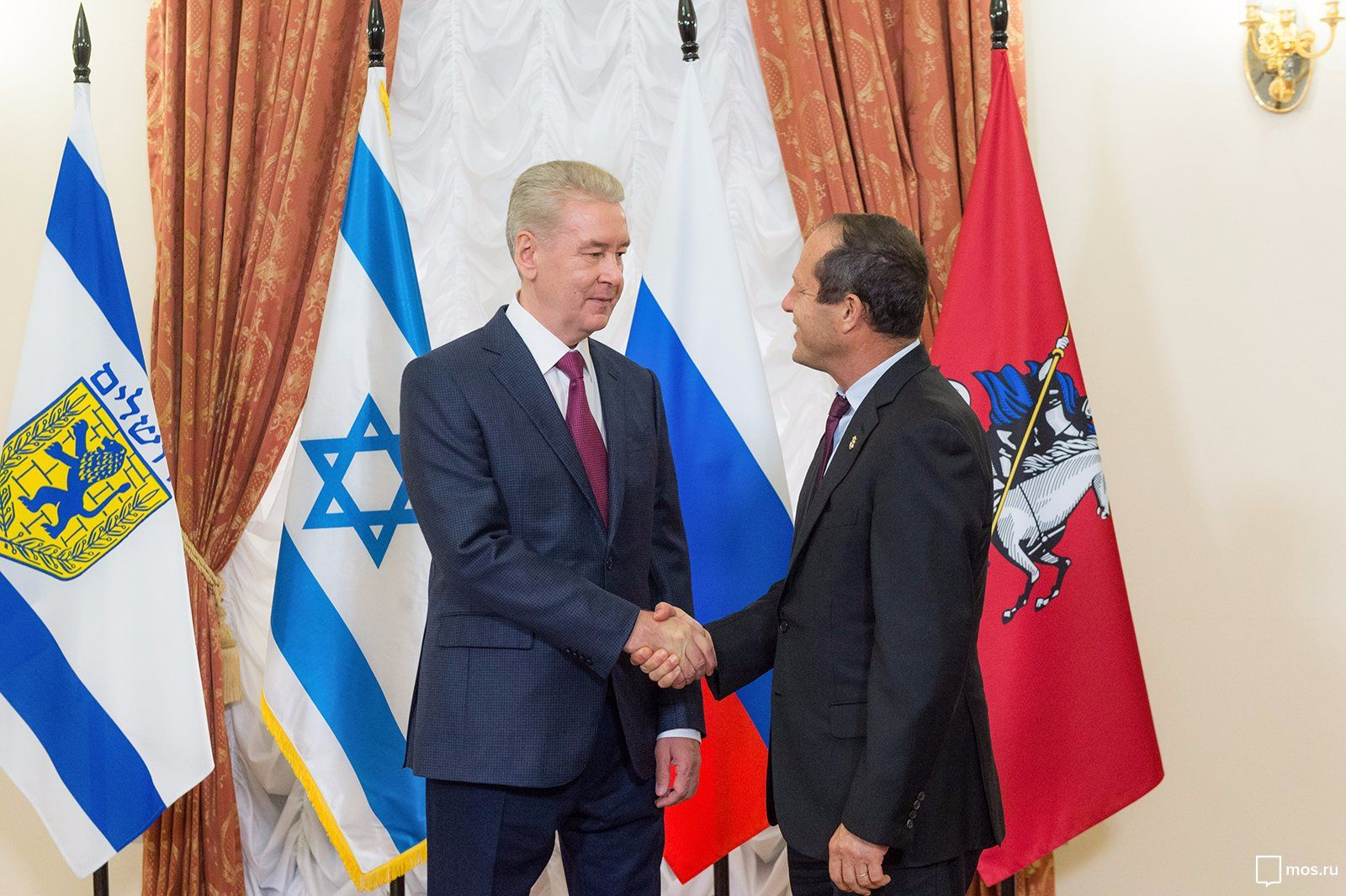
Nir Barkat and Mayor of Moscow Sergey Sobyanin in meeting in Moscow, 15 September 2017

=== Campaign for mayor of Jerusalem ===
Nir Barkat's entry into politics was gradual, after his exposure to and philanthropic investments in Jerusalem's education system. In 1999, the Barkat family began to explore the educational gaps in Jerusalem through their investment in The Snunit Center for the Advancement of Web Based Learning, a non-profit, non-governmental organization which uses web based resources to improve online education and improve personal and social growth within the Israeli society. Barkat saw this investment as the beginning of his interest in entering into Jerusalem's municipal politics.

Barkat's official entry into politics began in January 2003, when he founded the party Yerushalayim Tatzli'ah ("Jerusalem Will Succeed") and ran in the Jerusalem mayoral race, securing 43% of the vote and losing to Uri Lupoliansky. After his initial loss, Barkat served as head of the opposition on the city council until his election as mayor in 2008. During this period he helped form StartUp Jerusalem, a venture to create jobs in the capital. He briefly led the Jerusalem faction of the Kadima party from 2006 - 2007, then a powerhouse in Israeli politics, but left due to disagreements with the proposal to relinquish portions of Jerusalem.

=== Mayor of Jerusalem ===
Barkat ran for a second time in November 2008, this time winning the election with 52% of the vote (his main rival, Meir Porush, won 43%). Barkat was described as a secular politician, contrasting with both Lupoliansky and Porush, who are Haredi. He ran on a platform of increasing tourism, finding solutions to the housing crisis, and opposing the light rail. He also vowed to make city council more approachable and transparent and decried the use of the mayor's office a stepping stone to national politics. Controversies during his first term included the dismissal of city council member Rachel Azaria and his proposal for relinquishing predominantly Arab populated neighborhoods on the outskirts of the city limits. He helped to initiate the city's first international marathon in 2011 and has personally participated in races both in Jerusalem and abroad.

In 2013, he ran for a second term, during which he was endorsed by the Labor Party, and also by a range of prominent Likud activists; he also had the tacit support of Meretz, which withdrew its candidate, Pepe Alalu, in order not to steal votes away from Barkat. His opponent Moshe Lion had backing from Avigdor Lieberman, head of the Yisrael Beiteinu party and Aryeh Deri, head of Shas. Barkat was re-elected with 52% of the vote compared to his main opponent Moshe Lion former head of the Jerusalem Development Authority, who ran as the Likud candidate who garnered 43% of the electorate. Lion has since served as a member of city council and in 2015 joined Barkat's coalition. Following the tense campaign, Barkat was fined NIS 400,000 for improper use of election funds. Since his election as Mayor, Barkat served the city for a salary of one shekel a year.

Controversies of his second term included the Formula 1 exhibition, part of the mayor's effort to raise Jerusalem's status as a cultural capital of the world and increase tourism. The Jerusalem Formula One event took place in 2013 and in 2014 but garnered criticism for street closures which led to school cancellations, over expenditures, and its appropriateness for the city. Other controversies included planned addition to the light rail, specifically the blue line, which was planned to run down Emek Refaim street. Barkat also had a long-running feud with Finance Minister Moshe Kahlon over funding which led to city-wide strikes several years in a row. Kahlon argued that Barkat was wasting funding and mismanagement, while Barkat argued that Kahlon was withholding funds for political reasons. The resulting strikes caused garbage to pile up throughout the city and the threat of mass dismissals of municipal employees.

In December 2015 Barkat joined the Likud party. He previously endorsed Likud leader Benjamin Netanyahu for Prime Minister in the 2013 and 2015 Knesset elections. In March 2018 he announced his intention to run for national politics rather than seek re-election for a third term as mayor.

Since the mid-2000s, Jerusalem has developed into a regional center for tech start-ups, and was named the #1 emerging tech hub by Entrepreneur magazine. Barkat's administration has provided incentives, tax breaks, and grants for companies with employees living in the city. By 2016, over 500 start-ups had been established in Jerusalem, bringing in upwards of $243 million in investment in the first nine months of 2015. "'After the election of [Mayor Nir] Barkat, personal activism strengthened in the city. People felt they had influence, and it really connected with the entrepreneurial character', said Dana Mann, a partner in PICO Ventures, and previously a partner in OurCrowd."

Barkat has come under fire from some women's rights activists. Some women on the Jerusalem City Council have protested illegal modesty signs. Jerusalem city councilwoman Rachel Azaria, who brought the case of gender-segregated buses in Jerusalem to the court's attention, was fired by Barkat. Laura Wharton, a member of Jerusalem City Council, complained about the illegal modesty signs, but claims she was brushed off." Barkat has criticized Women of the Wall for their confrontational efforts to pray at the Kotel.

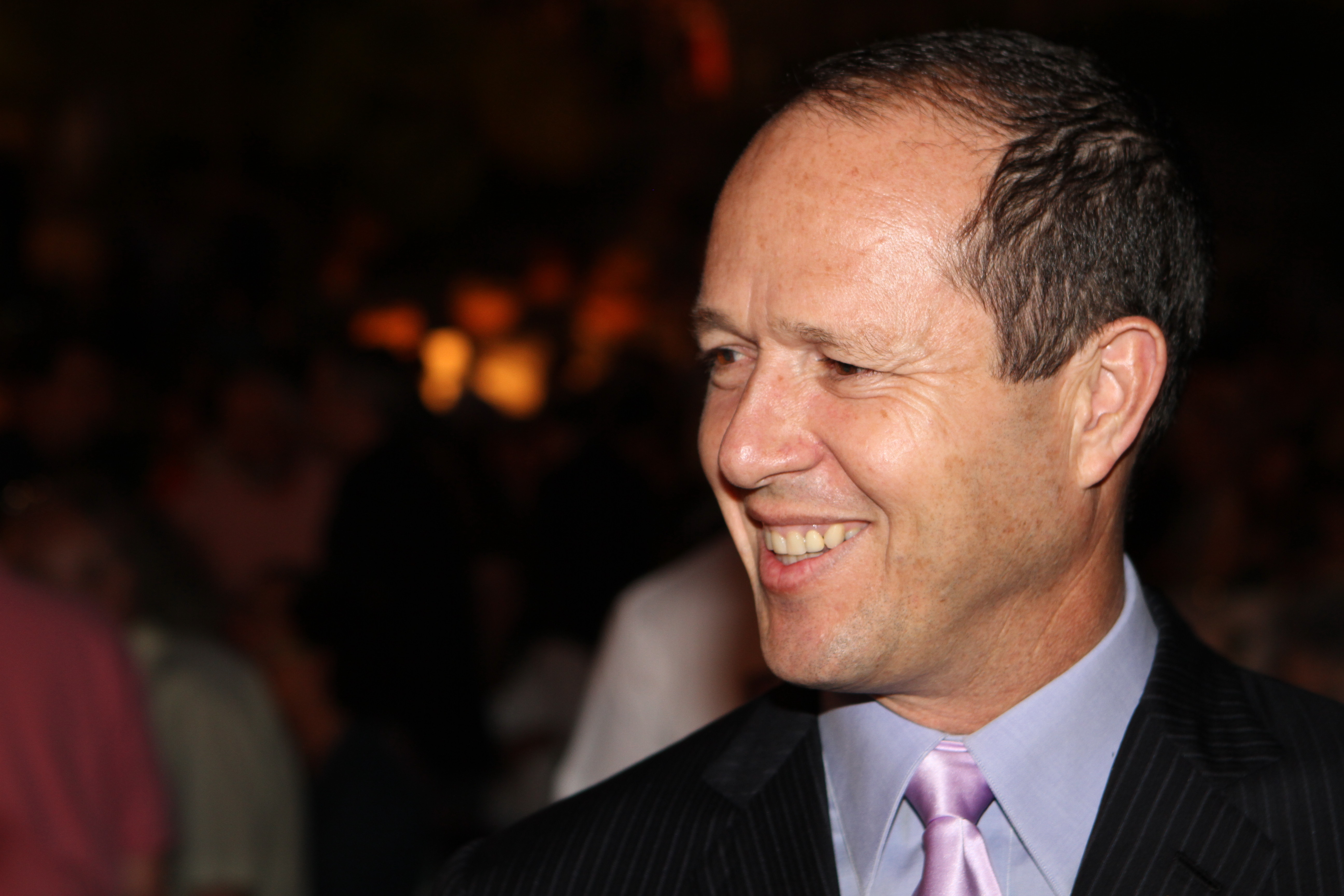
Nir Barkat appears at the beginning of the Jerusalem Film Festival in 2012.

=== 2015 terrorist attack ===
In February 2015, Barkat garnered international attention when he intervened after seeing a Palestinian man trying to stab a Jewish person. Barkat succeeded in physically subduing the attacker, with the Mayoral security detail coming in immediately afterward and the victim receiving first aid. The Tzahal Square incident prompted responses from figures such as former Israeli ambassador to the United States Michael Oren, who stated that Barkat had "courageously" acted, as well as commentators on Facebook who shared tongue-in-cheek images depicting Barkat as Batman, Neo, and other film characters. In October 2015, he encouraged Israelis to carry guns as a "duty" in light of increased tensions. His comments were criticised by various commentators.

=== National politics ===
In March 2018 he announced he would not run for another term in the Municipal Election, and instead will join the Likud Party, to be a member of Knesset in next elections. On 4 December 2018, he ceased serving as mayor.

Barkat was appointed Minister of Economy and Industry on 1 January 2023, on behalf of his party, the Likud.

After the Israeli military police in July 2024 visited Sde Teiman detention camp to detain nine Israeli soldiers suspected of abuse of a Palestinian prisoner, Barkat declared: "I support our fighters and call on the defense minister to immediately put a stop to the despicable show trial against them."

During the Gaza War in April 2024, Barkat was interviewed on the Morning Joe show. When co-host Mika Brzezinski asked Barkat about "civilians starving in Gaza", Barkat responded by using air quotes to refer to "innocent people in Gaza", implying he did not believe there were innocents in Gaza. Barkat said "We don't want anybody, any civilian, to suffer. And we collaborate with the world, helping the 'innocent people, the innocent people in Gaza' — that 80% of them, 70, 80% of them support October 7 — we don't want anybody to starve or anything." Barkat had previously, in February 2024, posted on X that all humanitarian aid to Gaza be cut off until Israeli hostages were released by Hamas.

In June 2025, Nir Barkat, then serving as Minister of Economy, faced controversy when his neighbor, Dr. Renana Keydar, was arrested during a peaceful protest outside his home. The protest involved singing and holding signs related to hostages, but Keydar, who was not even part of the protesting group, was detained for wearing a hat that said "Democracy." The arrest escalated to a strip search, which Keydar described as humiliating and potentially sexually abusive, raising significant concerns about police conduct and the suppression of dissent. This incident was part of a broader pattern of police actions against protesters since the beginning of the Gaza war, highlighting tensions around freedom of expression and the right to protest in Israel. The event sparked outrage and drew comparisons to authoritarian practices, further fueling debates about democratic values and government response to dissent. An interview with Keydar, conducted by N12 News and shared on social media, detailed the arrest and subsequent treatment, amplifying public and media scrutiny of the event.

== See also ==
- Politics of Israel

Political offices
Preceded by Uri Lupolianski	Mayor of Jerusalem; 2008–2018	Succeeded by Moshe Lion
