= 2018 Jerusalem municipal election =

Mayoral election in Jerusalem

- 30 October 2018 (first round); 13 November 2018 (runoff)
- Turnout: 39.86% (first round); 35% (runoff)
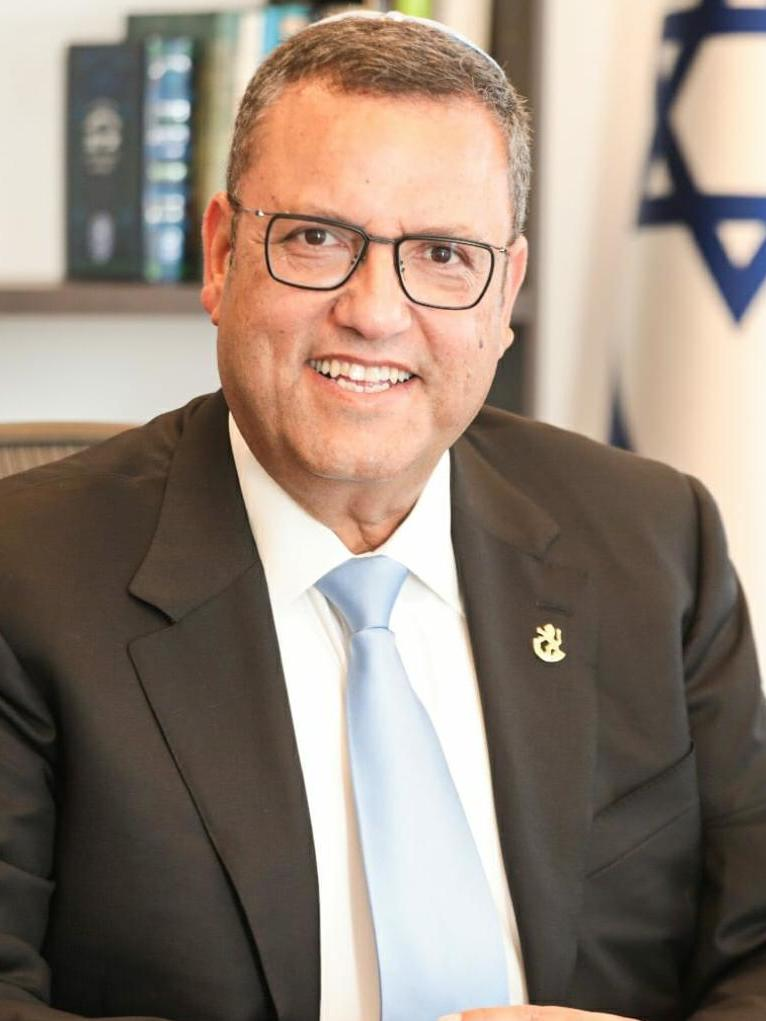

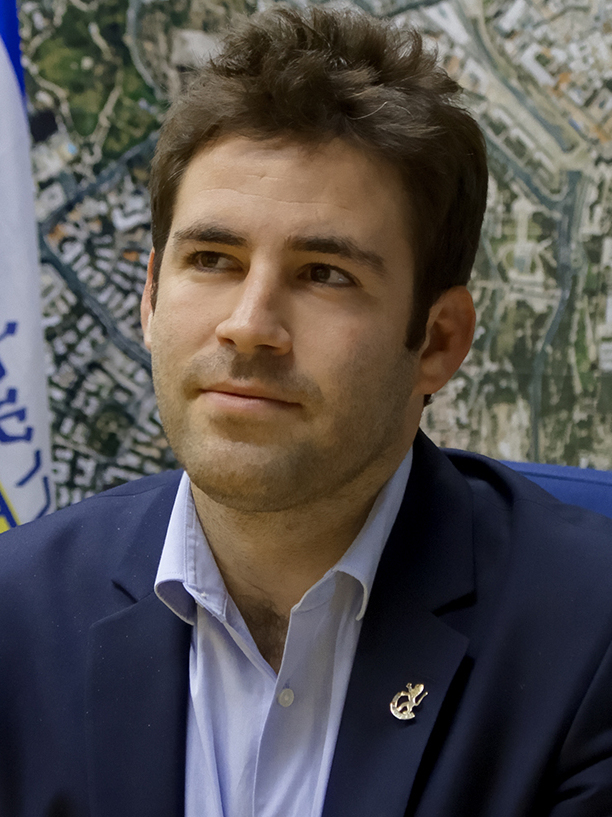

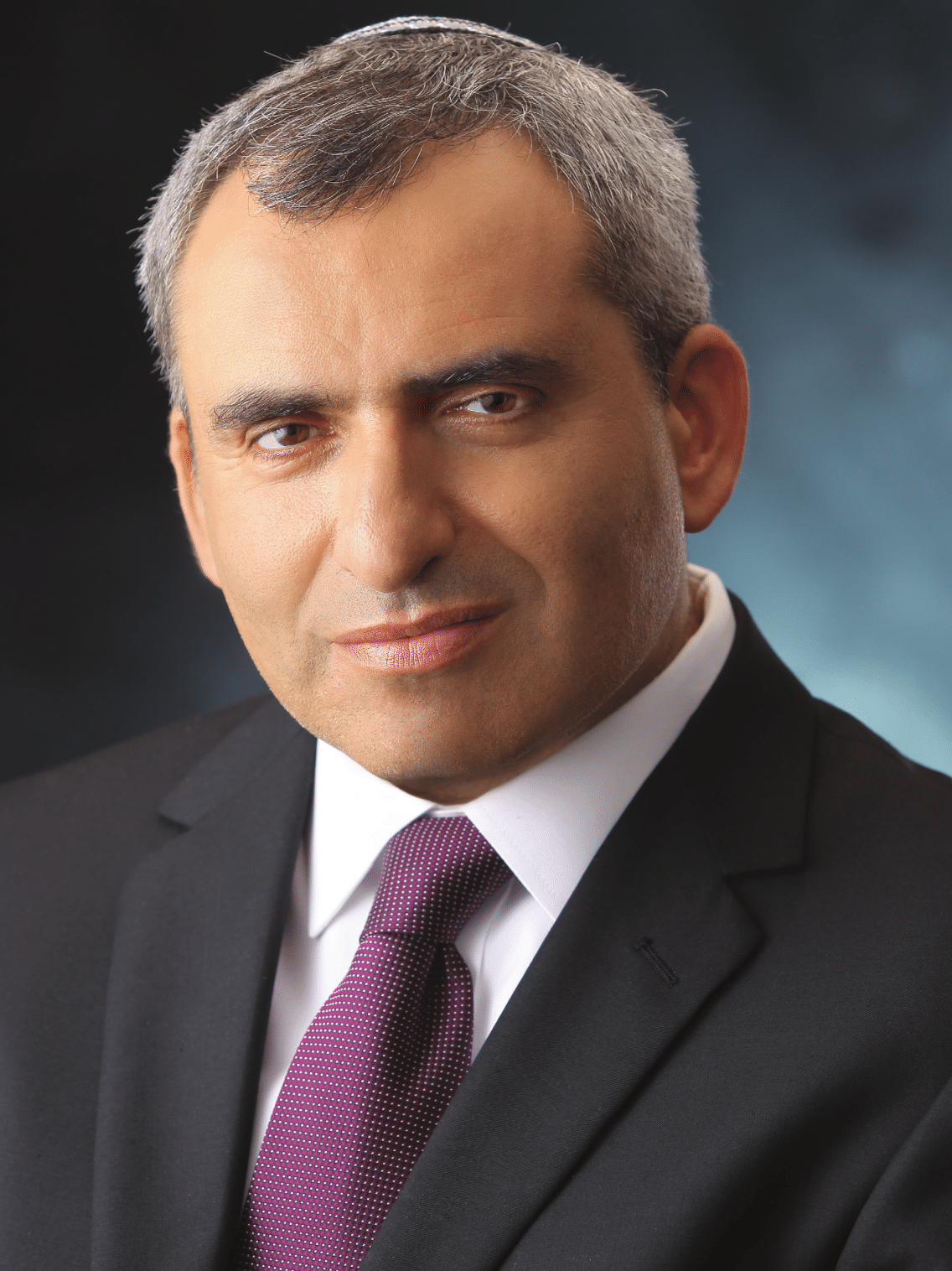

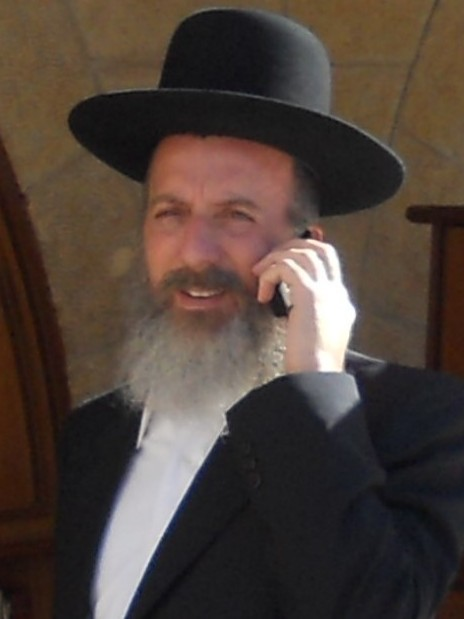
Candidate	Moshe Lion	Ofer Berkovitch
Party	Our Jerusalem	Hitorerut
First-round vote	81,426	73,079
First-round percentage	32.76%	29.40%
Second-round vote	112,744	108,979
Second-round percentage	50.85%	49.15%
Candidate	Ze'ev Elkin	Yossi Daitsh
Party	Jerusalem Will Succeed	Agudat Yisrael
First-round vote	49,681	42,289
First-round percentage	19.99%	17.01%
Mayor before election
Nir Barkat
Independent politician
Elected mayor
Moshe Lion
Independent politician
- City council
- 30 October 2018
- All 31 seats on the Jerusalem City Council; 16 seats needed for a majority
- Turnout: 39.86%
Party	Leader	Vote %	Seats	+/–
Hitorerut	Ofer Berkovitch	18.47	7	+3
Degel HaTorah	Eliezer Rauchberger	16.57	6	+3
Shas	Zvika Cohen	13.73	5	0
Agudat Yisrael	Yossi Daitsh	10.42	3	−2
The Jewish Home - National Union	Hagit Moshe	5.69	2	+1
Jerusalem Will Succeed	Ze'ev Elkin	4.85	2	−2
United	Aryeh King	4.80	2	0
Meretz	Laura Wharton	4.11	1	−1
Saving Jerusalem	Yosi Havilio	4.05	1	+1
Bnei Torah	Haim Epstein	3.62	1	0
Likud	Elisha Peleg	3.16	1	0
Our Jerusalem	Moshe Lion	2.19	1	+1
This lists parties that won seats. See the complete results below.

The 2018 Jerusalem municipal election was held on 30 October to elect the mayor and city council of Jerusalem.

Incumbent mayor Nir Barkat did not seek re-election. With no mayoral candidate in the first round meeting the vote threshold of 40% needed to avoid a runoff election, a runoff was held on 13 November, Which was won by Moshe Lion.

== Background ==
In March 2018, incumbent mayor Nir Barkat announced he would forgo running for a third term, and would instead run on the Likud party's list in the next Knesset election.

Under a new national law, the 30 October election day was made a holiday. However, the day of the 13 November runoff election day was not.

The election was part of the 2018 Israeli municipal elections.

== Mayoral ==
=== Candidates ===
==== Ran ====
Candidate	Background	Party	
Moshe Lion	Member of the Jerusalem City Council, former chairman of the Jerusalem Development Authority, candidate for mayor in 2013	Our Jerusalem	ירושלים שלנו, Yerushalayim Shelanu
Ofer Berkovitch	Member of the Jerusalem City Council	Awakening	התעוררות, Hit'orerut
Ze'ev Elkin	Member of the Knesset, Minister of Jerusalem Affairs, Minister of Environmental Protection	Jerusalem Will Succeed	ירושלים תצליח, Yerushalayim Tatzli'ah
Yossi Daitsh	Deputy Mayor of Jerusalem	Agudat Yisrael	אגודת ישראל
Avi Salman	Former aide to incumbent Mayor Nir Barkat	I'm Jerusalem	אני ירושלים, Ani Yerushalayim

==== Withdrew ====
- Rachel Azaria, member of the Knesset (endorsed Elkin)
- Chaim Epstein, member of the Council of Jerusalem
- Aziz Abu Sarah, ran a campaign to become the first Arab mayor of Jerusalem since 1944. As the law does not allow permanent residents who are not citizens to run for the mayoral office, he petitioned the Supreme Court to overturn the law. He withdrew saying that the Interior Ministry had refused to extend his laissez passer and having faced opposition from fellow Palestinians who mostly boycott local elections in Jerusalem.

=== First round ===
==== Campaigning ====
Lion had the backing of the city's Haredi parties, which are influential in city, which has population that is more than one-fifth Haredi (between only Jews more than a third are Haredi, Arab voters who make up an estimate four in ten city's residents boycott elections). Lion, who in his unsuccessful 2013 campaign for mayor had run as the Likud nominee, ran as an independent in 2018.

Berkovitch positioned himself as a secular leader, opposing the influence of the Haredi.

Elkin boasted the endorsements of Prime Minister Benjamin Netanyahu and outgoing mayor Nir Barkat. He was considered the race's front-runner.

Unlike other Haredi political parties, the Hasidic party Agudat Yisrael did not support Lion, and instead backed the candidacy of Yossi Daitsh.

Berkovitch and Elkin assailed each other. Elkin characterized Berkovitch as young and incompetent. Berkovitch characterized the filthiness of the city as a direct failure of Elkin's as the nation's environmental minister. Berkovitch also cited allegations by the Movement for Quality Government in Israel against Elkin, which accused Elkin of using his ministerial post for self-enrichment.

Not originally seen as a leading candidate when he entered the race, Berkovitch was seen as benefiting from the crowded size of the field of candidates running, and rose to become a front-runner.

==== Polling ====
Date	Poll source	Rachel Azaria	Offer Berkovitch	Yossi Daitsh	Ze'ev Elkin	Chaim Epstein	Yosi Havilio	Moshe Lion	Avi Salman	Undecided
Late-October 2018	Shvakim Panorama	-	30.7%	11.4%	23.6%	-	-	29.8%	0.4%	-
August 2018	Dialog (for Elkin campaign)	5.8%	24.6%	20.3%	31.9%	-	-	13.0%		
August 2018	Channel 2	6%	22%	23%	21%	3%	4%	11%	1%	
Early-August 2018	Berkovitch campaign		26.9%	25.4%	-	-	-	11.1%		

==== Results ====
The failure of Elkin to advance to the runoff was considered an upset defeat.

The results of the first round of voting in Jerusalem, with 254,326 voters participating of 638,065 eligible (a 39.86% turnout), are as follows. Of the 254,326 votes, 248,585 were valid.

Candidate	Party	Votes	%
Moshe Lion	Our Jerusalem	81,426	32.76
Ofer Berkovitch	Hitorerut	73,079	29.40
Ze'ev Elkin	Jerusalem will succeed	49,681	19.99
Yossi Daitsh	Agudat Yisrael	42,289	17.01
Avi Salman	I'm Jerusalem	2,110	0.85
Total		248,585	100.00
Valid votes		248,585	97.74
Invalid/blank votes		5,741	2.26
Total votes		254,326	100.00
Registered voters/turnout		638,065	39.86
Source: Reshumot, MyNet Jerusalem

=== Runoff ===
==== Campaigning ====
Heading into the runoff, Lion continued to enjoy backing from the Haredi community, including the endorsements of the Degel HaTorah and Shas Haredi political partie, as well as the right wing Yisrael Beiteinu party. However, the day before the election, the rabbinical council of the Agudat Yisrael party instructed their supporters not to vote in the runoff, which was seen as aiding Berkovitch's chances against Lion.

Lion was viewed in the runoff to be the candidate representing the right wing., Lion received the endorsement of outgoing mayor Barkat in the runoff, while Prime Minister Netanyahu did not endorse a candidate in the runoff. Lion was also endorsed in the runoff by the local chapters of the Likud and The Jewish Home parties, as well as several Likud party ministers.

As is typical, the Arab populace in East Jerusalem boycotted the election.

==== Polling ====
Hypothetical polling

With Berkovitch and Elkin

Date	Poll source	Offer Berkovitch	Ze'ev Elkin	Undecided
August 2018	Dialog (for Elkin campaign)	38.8%	61.2%	

==== Results ====
The results of the second round of voting in Jerusalem are as follows. The voter turnout was 35%.

Candidate	Party	Votes	%
Moshe Lion	Our Jerusalem	112,744	50.85
Ofer Berkovitch	Hitorerut	108,979	49.15
Total		221,723	100.00
Valid votes		221,723	99.25
Invalid/blank votes		1,676	0.75
Total votes		223,399	100.00
Registered voters/turnout		638,065	35.01
Source: Reshumot, MyNet Jerusalem

== City council ==
32 members were elected to the Jerusalem City Council. (Note: Our Jerusalem failed to win any seats, but its leader Moshe Lion automatically became a member of the City Council as a result of his election as Mayor)

Party	Leader	Votes	%	Seats	+/–
Hitorerut	Ofer Berkovitch	46,310	18.47	7	+3
Degel HaTorah	Eliezer Rauchberger	41,540	16.57	6	+3
Shas	Zvika Cohen	34,412	13.73	5	–
Agudat Yisrael	Yossi Daitsh	26,116	10.42	3	-2
The Jewish Home - National Union	Hagit Moshe	14,252	5.69	2	+1
Jerusalem Will Succeed	Ze'ev Elkin	12,167	4.85	2	-2
United	Aryeh King	12,030	4.80	2	–
Meretz	Laura Wharton	10,306	4.11	1	-1
Saving Jerusalem	Yosi Havilio	10,155	4.05	1	New
Bnei Torah	Haim Epstein	9,077	3.62	1	–
Likud	Elisha Peleg	7,910	3.16	1	–
Pisgat Ze'ev is on the Map	Yael Antebi	5,514	2.20	0	-1
Our Jerusalem	Moshe Lion	5,500	2.19	1	New
Jerusalem Beiteinu	Ilya Liptsker	3,282	1.31	0	New
Jerusalem My City	Ramadan Dabash	2,999	1.20	0	New
Youths of Jerusalem	Yakir Gerassi	2,238	0.89	0	New
Jerusalem Headed for the Top	Nehamia Asaf	2,235	0.89	0	New
Seniors of Jerusalem	Avraham Tobol	2,044	0.82	0	–
Mixed Jerusalem	Evyatar Elbaz	1,096	0.44	0	New
I'm Jerusalem	Avi Salman	862	0.34	0	New
For the Neighborhoods	Avi Shalom	628	0.25	0	New
Total		250,673	100.00	32	+1
Valid votes		250,673	98.56		
Invalid/blank votes		3,674	1.44		
Total votes		254,347	100.00		
Registered voters/turnout		638,065	39.86		
Source: Reshumot, MyNet Jerusalem, Kol Ha'ir; On 2013 results: The Jerusalem Post, Behadrei Haredim
