= 2024 Jerusalem municipal election =

Mayoral election in Jerusalem

- 27 February 2024
- Mayoral election
- Turnout: 33.75%
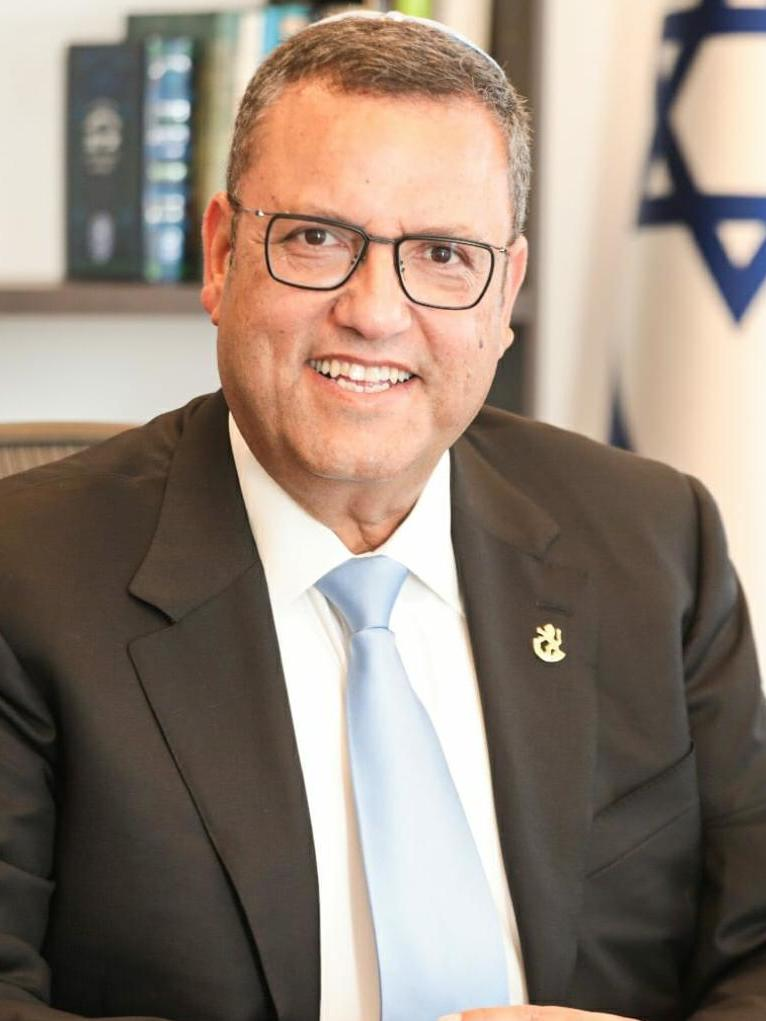

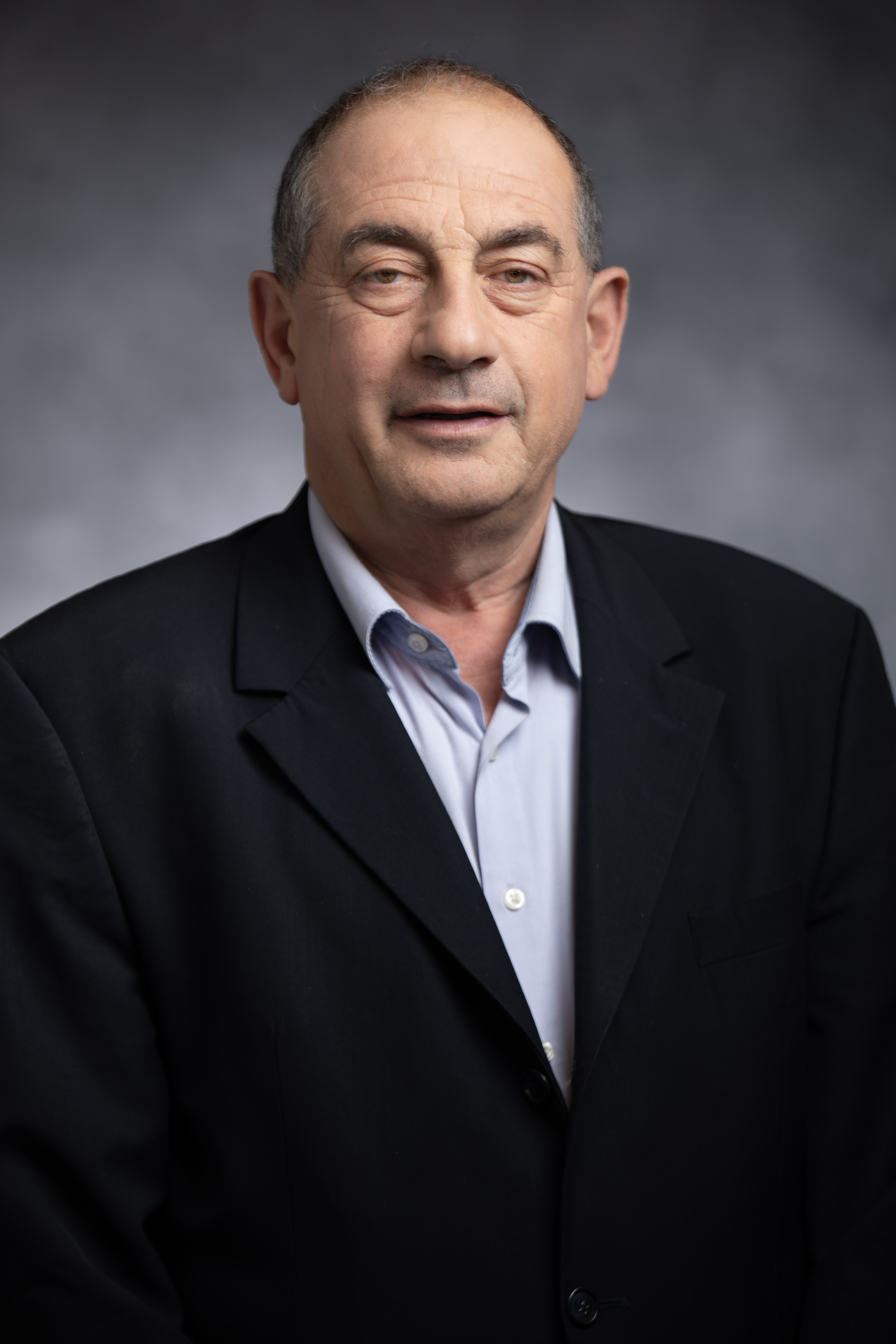
Candidate	Moshe Lion	Yosi Havilio
Party	Our Jerusalem	Jerusalem Union
Popular vote	179,285	41,871
Percentage	81.07%	18.93%
Mayor before election
Moshe Lion
One Jerusalem
Elected mayor
Moshe Lion
One Jerusalem
- City council election
- All 31 seats on the Jerusalem City Council; 16 seats needed for a majority
- Turnout: 33.76%
Party	Leader	Vote %	Seats	+/–
Degel HaTorah	Eliezer Rauchberger	19.16	6	0
Shas	Zvika Cohen	18.24	6	+1
Jerusalem Union	Yosi Havilio	11.66	4	+2
Hitorerut	Adir Schwartz	10.90	3	−4
Agudat Yisrael	Yitzhak Brim	9.83	3	0
Our Jerusalem	Moshe Lion	7.22	2	+1
United	Aryeh King	5.23	2	0
Religious Zionist Party	Hagit Moshe	5.00	2	0
Likud	Yael Antebi	3.59	1	0
Bnei Torah	Haim Epstein	3.06	1	0
Noam	Eldad Rabinowitz	2.66	1	+1
This lists parties that won seats. See the complete results below.

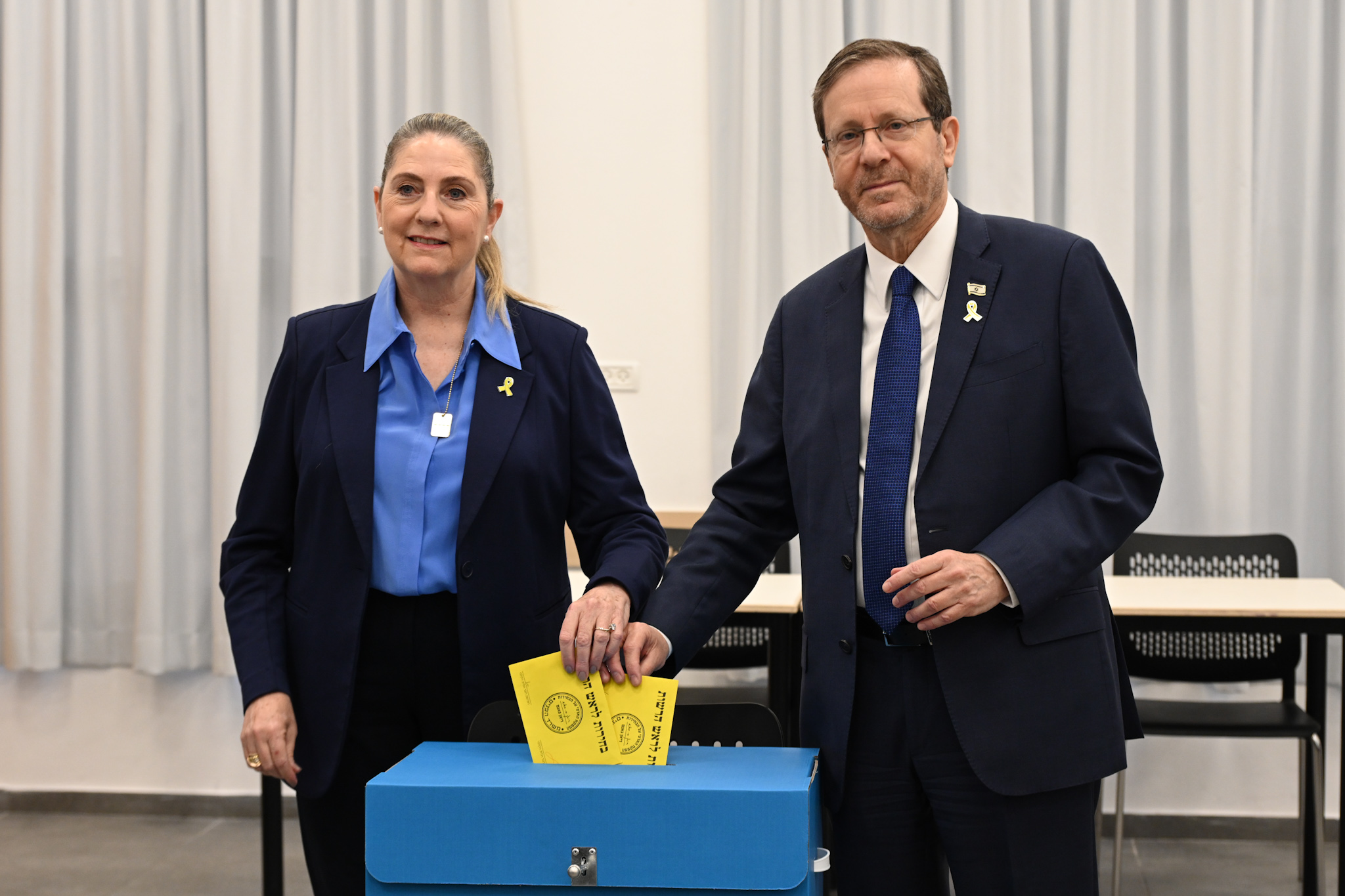
President Isaac Herzog and First Lady Michal Herzog voting in the Jerusalem municipal election

The 2024 Jerusalem municipal election was held on 27 February 2024, to elect the mayor and members of the City Council.

== Background and system ==
The election was part of the 2024 Israeli municipal elections. Originally scheduled for 31 October 2023, the elections were delayed due to the Gaza war until 30 January 2024, and then further delayed until 27 February 2024, because of the large number of candidates serving as reservists.

Unlike legislative elections, where only Israeli citizens (resident in Israel) who are 18 or older are eligible to vote, all Israeli citizens (resident in Israel) and permanent residents who are 17 or older are eligible to vote in municipal elections in Israel.

On election day, voters received two envelopes, one yellow and one white. When entering the polling booth, the voter chose one yellow ticket for the mayor and inserted it into the yellow envelope, and one white ticket for the City Council and inserted it into the white envelope.

There are 31 seats on the City Council, the maximum permitted by law. If the elected mayor's list would not win any seats, the mayor would be added to the Council as a thirty-second member. The seats are distributed using proportional representation and the largest remainder method, with a threshold of 0.75 of the votes needed for a seat.

== Mayoral candidates ==
Two candidates ran for Mayor: Mayor Moshe Lion, and Deputy Mayor Yosi Havilio.

A third candidate, Haim Epstein of the ultra-Orthodox party Bnei Torah, dropped out. For the first time since 1967, an Israeli Arab, attorney Waleed Abu Tayeh from Nazareth, announced candidacy for the office of mayor, but ultimately did not file his candidacy on the mayoral election; he was third on the Kol Toshaveha list for City Council.

Incumbent mayor Moshe Lion headed the One Jerusalem list, and was endorsed by most right-wing and religious parties. Yosi Havilio led the Jerusalem Union (Ha'ihud Ha'yerushalmi) list, composed of five parties: Havilio's party Saving Jerusalem, Meretz (Dr. Laura Wharton), Labor (Eran Ben Yehuda), Yesh Atid (Yeela Bitton De-Lange), and New Deal, consisting of organizations active in the 2023 Israeli judicial reform protests. Havilio is seen as representing the left-wing and secular populations of Jerusalem, with Lion having the backing of the Orthodox-Zionist and Haredi parties.

== City Council Lists ==
There are 31 seats on the City Council, the maximum permitted by law. If the elected mayor's list does not win any seats, the mayor is added to the Council as a thirty-second member, as happened in 2018. Fifteen lists competed for the 31 seats. Hitorerut (formerly headed by Ofer Berkovitz, currently headed by Adir Schwartz), winner of the most seats in the previous election, received an endorsement from the National Unity party. There is a new political list called All Its Residents (Kol Toshaveha) headed by an Arab Israeli woman from Nazareth, Sondos Alhot. Palestinians living in East Jerusalem are permanent residents of Israel, not citizens. Thus, they have the right to vote in the Jerusalem municipal election, but not in national elections for Knesset. An April 2021 op-ed noted that Arabs may play a major role in the 2023 municipal election, and another op-ed encouraged Arabs to become more politically active in the race for mayor and elections for Jerusalem City Hall.

Bold indicates a mayoral candidate; italic indicates a mayoral candidate who dropped out before the elections.

#	Letter on Ballot	List	Leader	Seats before election	Associated national party	Endorsed mayoral candidate
1	א	Jerusalem Union, האיחוד הירושלמי	**Yosi Havilio**	2	Yesh Atid, Meretz, Labor, New Deal	Havilio
2	ג	Agudat Yisrael Jerusalem, אגודת ישראל ירושלים	Yitzchak Brim	3	Agudat Yisrael	Lion
3	ד	Jerusalem First, קודם ירושלים	Elon Levy			-
4	דגל	Degel HaTorah, דגל התורה	Eliezer Rauchberger	6	Degel HaTorah	Lion
5	דף	All Its Residents, כל תושביה	Sondos Alhot			-
6	דרך	Jerusalem Unity, אחדות ירושלים	Avishai Cohen	2		Lion
7	הת	Hitorerut (Note: lit. "Awakening") in Jerusalem, התעוררות בירושלים	Adir Schwartz	5	National Unity	-
8	טב	Mafdal - Religious Zionism, מפדל-הציונות הדתית	Hagit Moshe	2	Mafdal–Religious Zionism	Lion
9	יא	One Jerusalem, ירושלים אחת	**Moshe Lion**	1		Lion
10	יב	Jerusalem Will Succeed, ירושלים תצליח	Yehuda Ben Yosef	2		Lion
11	מחל	Likud for Jerusalem City Council, הליכוד למועצת העיר ירושלים	Yael Antebi	1	Likud	Lion
12	ני	Jerusalem in Noam, (Note: "Noam" literally meaning "Pleasantness")ירושלים בנעם	Eldad Rabinowitz		Noam	Lion
13	עץ	Bnei Torah, בני תורה	Haim Epstein	1		Epstein
14	ק	United with Aryeh King, מאוחדים	Aryeh King	2	Otzma Yehudit	Lion
15	שס	Shas, התאחדות הספרדים שומרי תורה תנועתו של מרן הרב עובדיה יוסף זצ"ל	Zvika Cohen	5	Shas	Lion

== Issues ==
Key issues in the 2024 municipal election include real estate prices and development, highway repairs, and the rapidly spreading influence of Haredi Judaism in the city. Likewise, expansion of the Jerusalem Light Rail, especially the controversial blue line on Emek Refaim in the German Colony and Katamon, and a cable car from the First Station to Jerusalem's Old City and, eventually, the Mount of Olives divided voters.

Another issue facing West Jerusalemites was the debate over the increasing number of high-rise towers. Opponents included Kiryat HaYovel's Yuvalim 2041 activist group. The debate centered around whether the high-rise towers threaten the city's traditional character or not.

== Polling ==
=== Mayoral ===
Date	Poll source	Moshe Lion	Yosi Havilio	Haim Epstein	Undecided	Not Voting
16 September 2023	Maariv	48%	18%	-	34%	
9 February 2024	Maariv	43%	18%	2%	31%	6%

=== City Council ===
Date	Poll source	Jerusalem Union	Hitorerut	One Jerusalem	Agudat Yisrael	Degel HaTorah	Likud	United with Aryeh King	Shas	All Its Residents	Jerusalem Unity	Mafdal - Religious Zionism	Jerusalem Will Succeed	Jerusalem First	Bnei Torah	Noam	Olim to Jerusalem
30 October 2018	2018 election	2	5	1	3	6	1	2	5		2	2	2		1		
13 February 2024	Srugim	6	3	7	2	5	1	3	4								

== Results ==
=== Mayoral ===
Candidate	Party	Votes	%
Moshe Lion	Our Jerusalem	179,285	81.07
Yosi Havilio	Jerusalem Union	41,871	18.93
Total		221,156	100.00
Valid votes		221,156	94.86
Invalid/blank votes		11,990	5.14
Total votes		233,146	100.00
Registered voters/turnout		690,707	33.75
Source: Reshumot, Hol Ha'ir

=== City council ===
Party	Leader	Votes	%	Seats	+/–
Degel HaTorah	Eliezer Rauchberger	43,985	19.16	6	0
Shas	Zvika Cohen	41,856	18.24	6	+1
Jerusalem Union	Yosi Havilio	26,773	11.66	4	+2
Hitorerut	Adir Schwartz	25,010	10.90	3	-4
Agudat Yisrael	Yitzhak Brim	22,558	9.83	3	0
Our Jerusalem	Moshe Lion	16,582	7.22	2	+1
United	Aryeh King	12,014	5.23	2	0
Religious Zionist Party	Hagit Moshe	11,485	5.00	2	0
Likud	Yael Antebi	8,235	3.59	1	0
Bnei Torah	Haim Epstein	7,018	3.06	1	0
Noam	Eldad Rabinowitz	6,096	2.66	1	New
Jerusalem Will Succeed	Yehuda Ben-Yosef	2,818	1.23	0	-2
All its Citizens	Sondos Alhoot	2,455	1.07	0	New
Unity of Jerusalem	Avishai Cohen	1,742	0.76	0	New
Jerusalem First	Alon Levy	894	0.39	0	New
Total		229,521	100.00	31	-1
Valid votes		229,521	98.42		
Invalid/blank votes		3,695	1.58		
Total votes		233,216	100.00		
Registered voters/turnout		690,707	33.76		
Source: Reshumot, Kol Ha'ir, Hol Ha'ir
