= Yossi Daitsh =

Israeli politician

Yossi
- אהרן יוסף דייטש
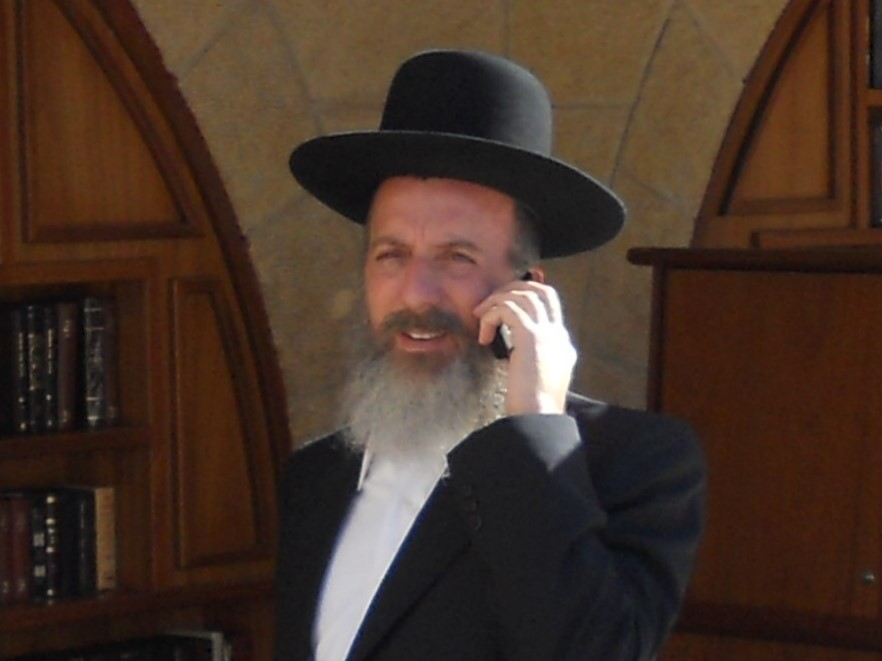
- Yossi Daitsh in 2013

Personal details
- Born: 1968 (age 57–58) Jerusalem, Israel
- Party: Agudat Yisrael

Aharon Yosef "Yossi" Daitsh (also spelled Deutch or Deitch (Hebrew: אהרן יוסף דייטש; born 1968) is an Israeli politician who served as deputy mayor of Jerusalem, as a member of the Shlomei Emunim faction of the Agudat Yisrael party. Before the Jerusalem municipal election in October 2018, he held the Haredi housing portfolio, and served as deputy to the regional building and development portfolio holder.

== Biography ==
Daitsh was born in Jerusalem, the third of his parents' seven children; he is named after his grandfather. Growing up, his family (which has lived in the city up to seven generations) lived in the Givat Shaul neighborhood, and belonged to the Zvhil Chassidus. As a child, he learned successively in the "Etz Chaim" and Ger Talmud Torahs. After graduating from Talmud Torah (the Haredi equivalent of primary school), he studied in the Slonim Yeshivah in Mea Shearim, "Bet Avraham". Here, he became an adherent of Rabbi Shalom Brazovski, the Rosh Yeshivah and Rabbi of the Slonim Chassidus, and later served as his personal attendant for five years, living in Kiryat Ye'arim. Daitsh has remained a Hasid of Slonim ever since. At the age of 24, Daitsh married Shoshana Erblich, daughter of Shimon Erblich, an Israeli-Belgian businessman. Daitsh and his wife live in the Geulah neighborhood in Jerusalem. He is the father of six children, and has three grandchildren.

== Professional career and public service ==
After his marriage, Daitsh learnt half-time in Kollel, while in the other half, he served as secretary in the Slonim Yeshivah. Later, he worked as a real estate agent in the Haredi city Beitar Ilit. Daitsh was drafted into the Israeli army, and served at the Tze'elim army Base. Later, during 14 years, he served in the reserves – partly in the army rabbinate, and partly as a civic representative of the army in Jerusalem. He also served in the intelligence department. In early 1996, the municipal administration of the newly-founded city Beitar Ilit was first organized. In the city's first municipal election, Daitsh was campaign manager for Yehuda Gerlitz, the Agudas Yisrael candidate for the mayoralty; Gerlitz won. Later in that year, Daitsh became a secretary to Knesset member and Deputy minister for housing and development Meir Porush. As part of his activities in the housing ministry, Daitsh was involved in the marketing of thousands of housing units over the green line, in Beitar Ilit, Modiin Ilit, and Tel Tzion, and all throughout Gush Etzion and the West Bank. After the 1999 Knesset Election, Daitsh was parliamentary adviser to Meir Porush, who was again elected to the Knesset. In 2001, Porush was re-appointed to the housing ministry, and Daitsh accompanied him as before. When United Torah Judaism went to the opposition after the 2003 Knesset Election, Daitsh again served as parliamentary adviser to Porush in the Knesset. Aside from this, Daitsh served as a political activist for his Agudas Yisrael party, organizing fund-raising and campaign events. He also oversaw several municipal election campaigns, including the stormy 2007 municipal election in Beitar Ilit, where Meir Rubinstein, the Agudas Yisrael candidate, won the mayoral race against Degel HaTorah's Yitzchak Pindrus.

== In the Jerusalem municipality ==
In 2003, Daitsh was placed on the United Torah Judaism (for the Agudas Yisrael faction) list for the Jerusalem City Council in the municipal elections that year; and in 2005, he joined the council as part of a rotation agreement with the other Party faction, Degel HaTorah. He was appointed member of the regional housing and development committee. In 2007, Daitsh participated in founding the Kemach Program, designed to forward Haredi integration in the workforce. Up to 30,000 men and women have been helped as part of the organization's activities. After the municipal elections in 2008, Daitsh was appointed to the sanitation portfolio, and charged with heading the project of road and building renewal in the Haredi neighborhoods, Malchei Yisrael, Zichron Moshe, Romema, Habucharim, Kerem Abraham, and Mekor Baruch. As of 2018, the cost of the improvements has come to above 200 million Shekels. In 2010, Daitsh was appointed Deputy mayor to then-Mayor Nir Barkat. After the 2013 municipal election, Daitsh (after being re-appointed Deputy mayor) received the Haredi housing portfolio, and was appointed deputy to the housing and development portfolio holder. As part of his activities in the housing committee, Daitsh put forward projects for the expansion of the neighborhoods beyond the green line, the improvement of earthquake regulations, and also plans for a tourism center and increase of security in Har Hazeisim. In 2016, Daitsh, together with fellow Haredi council member Shlomo Rosenstein, initiated the project "Olim l'Yerushalaim", which since has taken place every year. The budget for the project initially stood at 3 million shekels, the next year at 5.5 million shekels, and in 2018 at 8 million. The project was accounted a success, with up to one hundred thousand participants in just 2018.

== Candidacy for Jerusalem mayoralty in 2018 ==
After incumbent mayor Nir Barkat's announcement in early 2018 that he would not run for a third term, much speculation arose around Daitsh's possible run to succeed him; as the senior member of the UTJ party in Jerusalem, and given his long experience and impressive resume, he was viewed by many pundits as the only Haredi candidate who could win the election. With figures showing that the Haredim already comprise about 35% of Jerusalem's Jewish population, Daitsh was the early favorite to win, and polls conducted in late August and September showed him winning the election in the first round, with over 40% of the vote. However, Daitsh delayed launching his campaign, due to his desire to secure the support of all the Haredi parties in the capital before proceeding. His own party (Agudat Yisrael) officially pronounced him their candidate for mayor in July, but Shas and Degel HaTorah delayed their decision until the middle of September, when they announced their support of candidate Moshe Lion, instead; Daitsh opened his campaign in late September nonetheless, but was given little chance by the pundits, in spite of widespread admiration of his debate performances against fellow candidates Ze'ev Elkin, Ofer Berkovitch, and Moshe Lion. Daitsh received the support of the Chardali party Meuchadim of Aryeh King and Eli Yishai, and was endorsed by former mayor Uri Lupolianski and Deputy Mayor Meir Turgeman, and by several prominent Dati Leumi rabbis in the capital; but on election day (October 30, 2018), he finished fourth out of four major candidates, earning 17.0% of the vote (Lion took 32.8%, Berkovitch 29.4%, Elkin 20.0%). Lion won the election in the second round (stipulated by law if no candidate gets 40% in the first). Daitsh's position in the incoming mayor's coalition is unclear.
