= Jerusalem City Council =

Governing body of the city of Jerusalem

- Jerusalem City Council 2024–2029
- Coat of arms of Jerusalem

Type
- Type: Unicameral city council

History
- Established: 1863
- New session started: 13 March 2024

Structure
- Seats: 31 plus Mayor
- Length of term: 5 years
- Authority: Municipalities Ordinance (1964)

The Jerusalem City Council is the governing body of the city of Jerusalem. Meeting at the Jerusalem Municipality in Safra Square, it comprises 31 city councilors and the Mayor of Jerusalem. The current council was elected in the 2024 Jerusalem municipal election.

== History ==
The first modern city council in Jerusalem was established by the Ottoman empire in Jerusalem in 1863. By 1840, the Jewish community constituted the largest single religious group in the city. From the 1880s onward, the Jews constituted the majority within the city. However, it was only in 1937, under the British Mandate, that the first Jewish mayor was appointed. Since 1967 every mayor has been Jewish.

From 1948 to 1967 two municipalities operated in the city: an Israeli municipality provided services to the western neighborhoods of the city and a Jordanian municipality to its eastern parts. After the Six-Day War and the unification of Jerusalem, the council has operated under the authority of the Israeli Municipalities Ordinance.

Mayors and Deputy Mayors are roles with salaries - city councilors are unpaid.

== Palestinian alternative government ==
The Palestinian Authority, a provisional government created by the 1993 Oslo Accords, claims control over the eastern half of Jerusalem and has appointed a governor over the city, Adnan Ghaith. The PA controls the Arab education system in the city, but has no other practical governance powers.
