= Yosi Havilio =

Deputy Mayor of Jerusalem

- יוסי חביליו
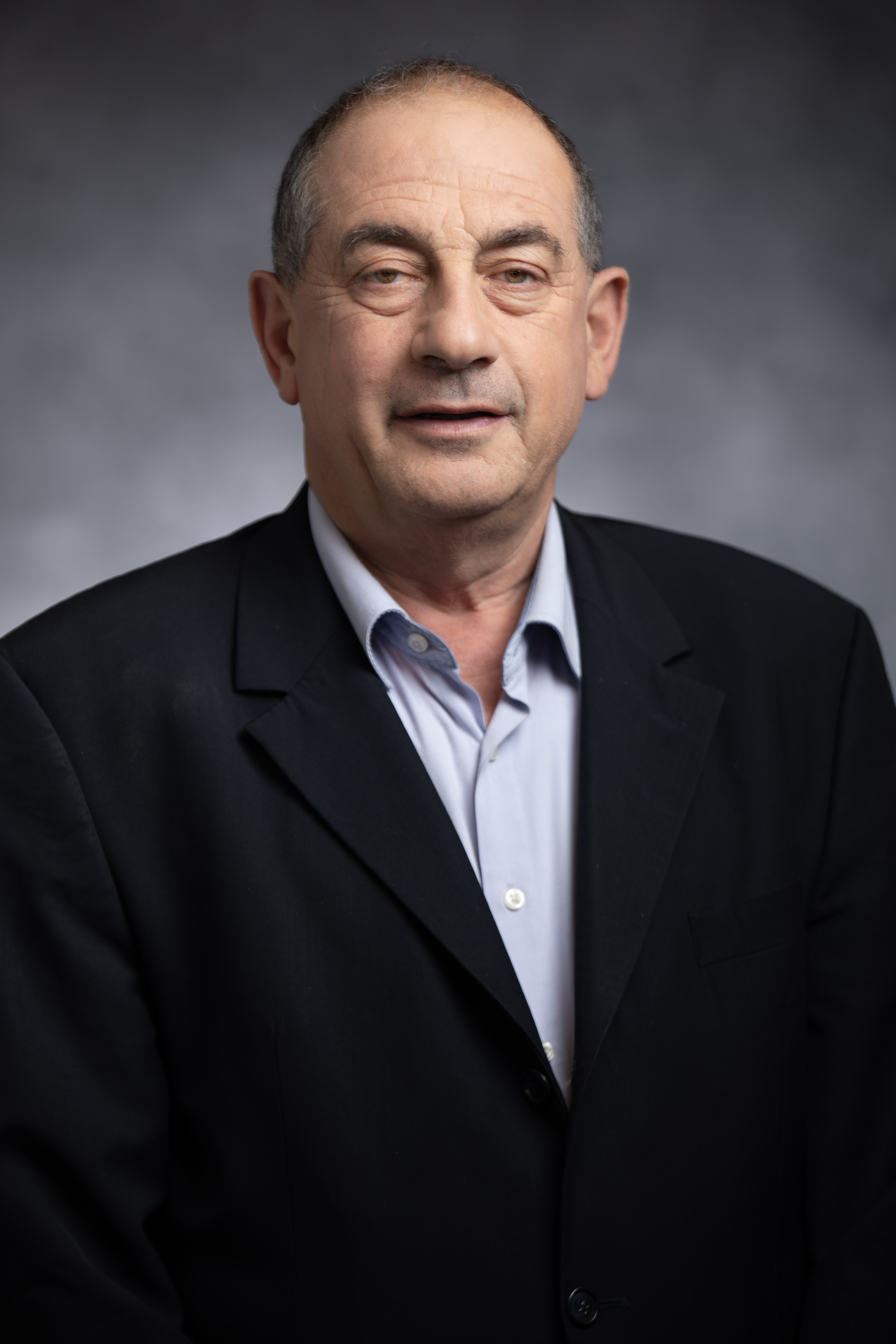
- Born: Yosef Havilio; 1959 (age 66–67); Jerusalem
- Other names: Yosef Havilio, יוסי חביליו
- Known for: Jerusalem Politician Pro-bono Attorney, Legal Advisor for Jerusalem municipality (2001-2011), Council Member (2018-2021) Deputy Mayor (2021-Present)

Yosef (Yosi) Havilio (Hebrew: יוסי חביליו) is an Israeli lawyer and politician who currently serves as a Deputy Mayor of Jerusalem. Havilio served as the Attorney General of Jerusalem, is a community activist, and is a recipient of the Knight of Quality Award given by the Movement for Quality Government in Israel. Havilio was a mayoral candidate in the 2024 Jerusalem election, running as the main opposition to incumbent mayor Moshe Lion.

== Early life ==
Havilio was born in 1959 in Jerusalem, Israel, and grew up in the Rassco neighborhood, where he attended the Jerusalem Rehavia Gymnasium. He played competitive sports with the Hapoel Jerusalem Youth Basketball team and as a track runner. Havilio won the gold medal in the 400m hurdles at the Israel Athletics Championships in 1976. In 1977, he was drafted to the Israeli Defense Forces, and served as an Aerial Explorer in the Intelligence Corps. After his military service, Havilio attended the Hebrew University of Jerusalem where he received a Bachelor of Arts degree in Law and a Master of Arts degree in Public Policy, Public Administration, and Law, graduating with honors.

== Career ==
After university, Havilio worked as an intern for Yitzhak Zamir at the Office of the Attorney General. Soon after, in 1985, Havilio opened a private law firm that focused on civil and commercial law.

=== Attorney General of Jerusalem ===
In 2001, Havilio was appointed Attorney General of Jerusalem. In this position, Havilio gave legal counsel to the Municipality, and worked as the lead public prosecutor. During his tenure, Havilio had some disagreements with mayor Uri Lupolianski on several issues. For example, Havilio was supportive of the city organizing the Jerusalem gay pride parade while mayor Lupolianski opposed. In 2010, Havilio resigned from his position as attorney general following a dispute with mayor Nir Barkat.

=== Law firm ===
In 2012, Havilio opened a private law firm that focused on public law, which gave legal advice to local councils and public committees, including as pro bono. The firm represented petitioners at the Supreme Court on several occasions, often regarding municipal policies in Jerusalem. Some cases involved debates over business closures during shabbat and other Jewish holidays, with Havilio arguing against closures. He also represented a case involving the liquidation of the public housing company Prazot, which ended with a settlement of 130 million shekels from Prazot going to fund apartments for those entitled to public housing in Jerusalem.

=== Community activism ===
In 2014, Havilio founded Tzahor, which claims to promote equality, social and legal justice, human rights, and proper governance in Jerusalem. The organization criticized and campaigned against the municipality's management of funds, which it claims was being used for personal political advancements. The organization also spoke against female and Arab under-representation in government positions, with only five women on the 32-seat city council in 2023. Havilio and Tzahor represented grocers in the non-Orthodox city center who wanted to open on Shabbat, and filed a lawsuit against the closing of the Har Homa swimming pool on Shabbat.

=== 2018 municipal campaign ===
In 2017, Havilio announced that he was running for mayor of Jerusalem, and launched the campaign slogan: "Havilio. Saving Jerusalem". In September 2018, he dropped out of the mayoral race, and endorsed Ofer Berkovitch. Havilio was elected to the City Council in the 2018 election, with his party winning 4% of the vote and one seat on the City Council.

=== Deputy mayor ===
After the election, Havilio joined Mayor Moshe Leon's coalition, and was selected to be a Deputy Mayor for half a term. Since beginning his term in July, Havilio has focused on local environmental causes, increasing women's representation, simulating community co-ops, and addressing the needs of the Arab population. In addition, Havilio's main focus is to represent the voice of the Hiloni and Masorti community in a city with a large Haredi population.

=== 2024 municipal campaign ===
In 2023, Havilio announced his intention to run for mayor of Jerusalem. The election, originally scheduled for the end of October 2023, was delayed to January 2024, then February 27, 2024, due to the breakout of the Gaza war. Yosi Havilio led the "Jerusalem Union" list, which was composed of five parties: Havilio's party Saving Jerusalem, Meretz (Laura Wharton), Labor (Eran Ben Yehuda), Yesh Atid (Yeela Bitton De-Lange), and "New Deal", a party formed by organizations active in the 2023 Israeli judicial reform protests.

== Awards and recognition ==
In 2010, Havilio won the Knight of the Quality of Government Award for his struggle for just governance. Judge Mishael Cheshin awarded Havilio saying: "Havilio's willingness to fight against powerful politicians, and endangering his job in order to prevent harm to our foundational institutions, should serve as the example for all public servants."

== Personal life ==
Havilio lives in Jerusalem with his wife Liora and their three children.
