= Rachel Azaria =

Israeli politician

- רחל עזריה
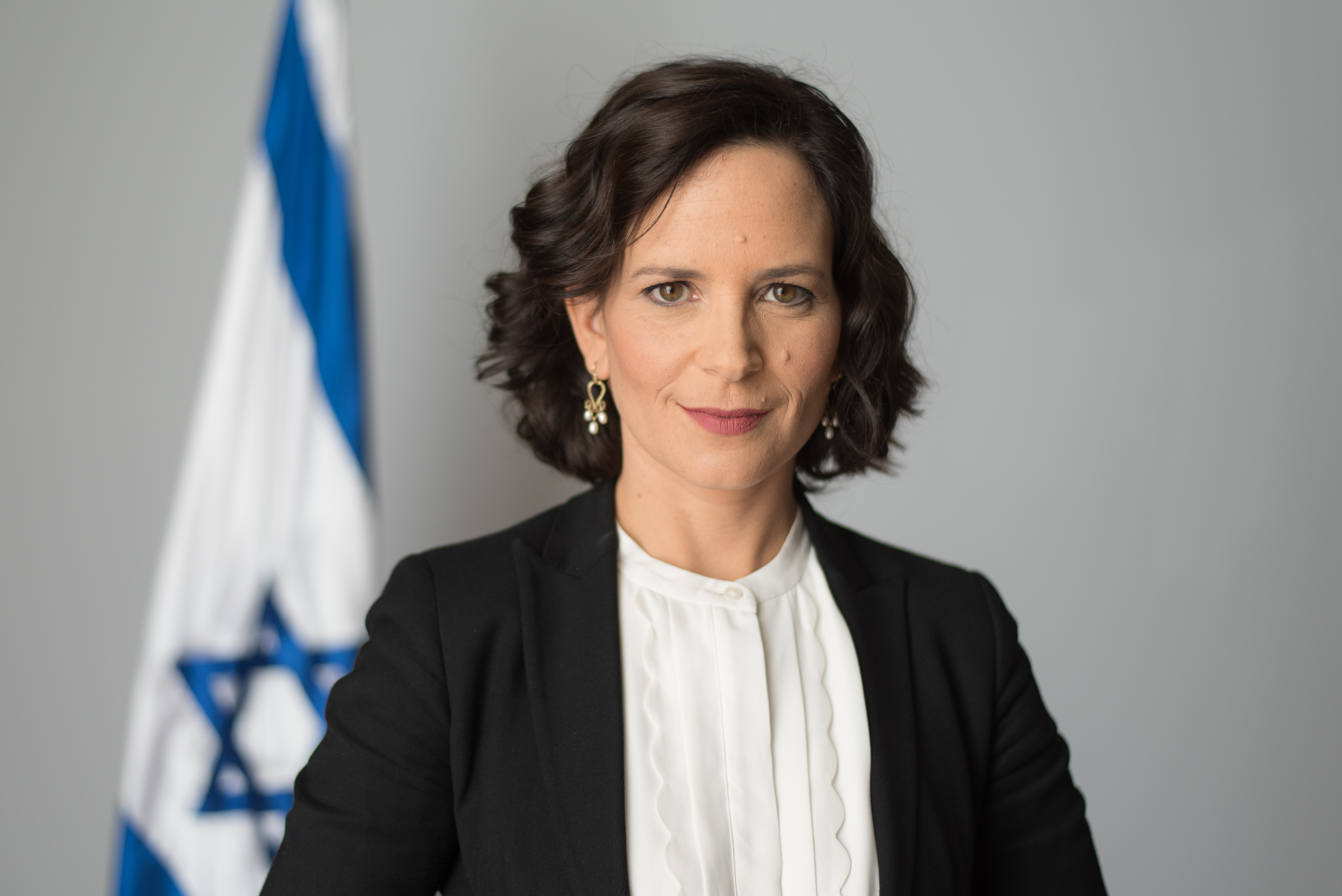

Faction represented in the Knesset
- 2015–2019: Kulanu

Personal details
- Born: 21 December 1977 (age 48) Jerusalem

Rachel Azaria (Hebrew: רחל עזריה; born 21 December 1977), is an Israeli social activist and former politician who served as a member of the Knesset for Kulanu. She previously served as deputy mayor and member of the Jerusalem City Council.

== Biography ==
Rachel Azaria was born in Jerusalem to Israel Azaria, a Tunisian-Jewish immigrant to Israel, and Sharon Friedman, an American Jewish immigrant to Israel at age 18. She grew up on moshav Beit Gamlieland was educated in the National Religious school system.

After serving in the Israel Defense Forces, Azaria studied at Hebrew University of Jerusalem, where she earned a BA in Psychology and a master's degree in conflict resolution.

She won the Tami Steinmetz Prize for her master's thesis on the self-perception of the founders of the first Israeli settlements in Samaria. She was a member of the debating team at the Hebrew University, participating in debates in the European and World Championships. She participated in the Shalom Hartman Institute's Young National Religious Leadership program from 2001 to 2003. She is fluent in English.

Azaria is married to Elyashiv, a Talmud teacher, and has four children, and lives in Jerusalem. She held US citizenship prior to her entering the Knesset, when she had to give it up as a condition of becoming an MK.

In 2015 her grandmother immigrated from the USA.

== Social activism ==
Since 1998, Azaria has been engaged in social activism. She serves as a member of the Board of Green Course, Israel's largest volunteer environmental organization. She has also been involved in issues related to Israel's national health basket, the Ashkelon coal plant, and the social impact of government economic plans.

Azaria was Director of Mavoi Satum from 2004-2007. It is a nonprofit organization which assists Jewish women who have been denied a get, a religiously accepted divorce, by their husbands. Under her leadership, the number of women who received a get with assistance from the organization tripled, and Mavoi Satum won recognition as the main advocacy organization in this field in Israel.

As a response to the October 7, 2023 Palestinian Hamas terror attacks, and the subsequent call up of hundreds of thousands of reserve soldiers into the IDF, Azaria formed HaOgen - The Anchor for Reservists’ Families, a nonprofit that offers assistance in many forms, supplying meals, events for the children, and more.

== Political career ==
Azaria was a founding member of the Yerushalmim political party in 2008 and served as its Chair until she was elected to the Knesset in 2015.

=== Jerusalem city council (2008-2015) ===
In 2008 Azaria was elected to the Jerusalem City Council. In her first term she held the early childhood education and community councils portfolios. But in 2011 The Jewish Daily Forward interviewed Azaria about punishment she had suffered on the council for standing up for legal rights of women. Jerusalem Mayor Nir Barkat stripped her of her portfolios to punish her for petitioning Israel's High Court of Justice to enforce an earlier ruling requiring police to prevent illegal gender segregation on the streets of Mea Shearim, an ultra-Orthodox neighborhood of Jerusalem.

After her reelection in 2013 she was appointed Deputy Mayor of Jerusalem as head of the Yerushalmim faction on the Jerusalem city council. As of January 2015, she holds the education portfolio and women's rights portfolio. As leader of the Yerushalmim party, Azaria has promoted "Community Kashrut," an effort to make kosher certification on food items a matter of trust between food establishments and their customers. Yerushalmim expects the project to open the kosher market to greater competition and to dislodge the monopoly the Chief Rabbinate of Israel exercises in Israel as the only source of kosher certification.

When a company responsible for placing ads on Jerusalem buses refused to run a campaign poster with her picture on it because ultra-Orthodox Jews object to posting women's pictures in public places, Azaria petitioned the court to force the buses to carry her ads. She has been engaged in the campaign to fight various types of exclusion, such as banning women from singing in public, separating women from men on city sidewalks, forcing women to sit at the back of the bus and the elimination of pictures of women in advertising. In a panel at the Brookings Institution, Azaria stated the efforts to promote women's rights has served as a bridge between Orthodox Jewish women and Israeli Arab women who grapple with similar issues and have begun to push for a voice in their communities.

=== Member of Knesset (2015-2019) ===
In January 2015, she joined Moshe Kahlon's Kulanu party, and announced that she would seek a Knesset seat under the party's banner. While Israelis can hold dual citizenship, a Basic Law passed in 1958 says that Knesset members cannot pledge allegiance as parliamentarians unless they give up foreign citizenship. Azaria renounced her American citizenship before joining the Knesset in March.

In December 2015, the Knesset approved a preliminary reading of legislation Azaria sponsored to enable fathers to take more time off from work to care for their infants. The proposed changes to the Women's Labor Law and the National Insurance Law passed with a vote of 49 in favor and none against.

At Azaria's initiative, Israel's mandatory minimum paid vacation law was updated for the first time since 1951, increasing the minimum legal paid vacation entitlement from 10 to 12 days.

In May 2018, Azaria led a group of 10 female MKs who boycotted speeches by fellow MK Yehuda Glick after it was revealed that he had met with a Gett refuser on Knesset grounds. It was not immediately clear why Glick — who had previously spoken in favor of prenuptial agreements to avoid the problems associated with gett refusal — had invited the get refuser. Approximately a week later, Glick posted to his Facebook page explaining that he was mediating the conflict between the estranged husband and wife. With the post, Glick attached a video showing Azaria and the other MKs not letting him speak from the Knesset plenum and criticized Azaria for not attempting to privately ask him for an explanation before publicly attacking him. The next day, Glick posted a picture with him and Azaria together noting that he had accepted her initiative to bury the hatchet.

=== Return to Jerusalem politics ===
In June 2018, Azaria announced that she would run for Mayor of Jerusalem in the 2018 Jerusalem mayoral election, though she had not yet secured the support of her former party at the time of her announcement. In July, the party decided to allow Azaria to return as its head. In response, the outgoing head of the party, Fleur Hassan-Nahoum chose to join Azaria's opponent, Ze'ev Elkin. Hassan-Nahoum said she was surprised when Azaria decided to run, and noted that she had a "real issue" with Azaria's candidacy splitting the city's pluralistic vote. In response, Azaria called it "unfortunate" that Hassan-Nahoum chose to leave the party after their decision and wished her good luck.

In September, Azaria decided to withdraw her name from the ballot and support Likud’s Environmental Protection Minister Ze'ev Elkin. Azaria returned to her role in the Knesset. She continued in this role until the government body officially passed a law dispersing itself in late December 2018. Following this announcement, Azaria announced in early January 2019 that she would be leaving the Kulanu party for the upcoming elections.

=== Post-politics ===
In 2022, Azaria was the CEO of the Darkenu movement for several months, where she helped promote the Supreme Court of Israel to support the IDF.

In October 2023 with the outbreak of the Gaza war, Azaria helped found "HaOgen for Reservist Families" aimed at providing support towards family members of reservists who are serving in the war.

== See also ==
- Women in Israel
- Female representation in local government in Israel
