= Sharkansky =

Sharkansky may refer to:

- Ira Sharkansky, Professor Emeritus of Political Science at the Hebrew University of Jerusalem
- Sharkansky District, an administrative and municipal district in the Udmurt Republic, Russia
