= Cable cars in Jerusalem =

Jerusalem Cable Cars

Overview
- Status: In Planning
- Location: Jerusalem, Israel
- No. of stations: 4

Technical features
- Line length: 1.4 km
- Operating speed: 28.8 km/h
- Notes: elevation 26 m

The Jerusalem Cable cars are a public transit project in Jerusalem Israel, intended to increase access to the Western Wall from West Jerusalem.

== Project ==
The project is being organized by the Jerusalem Development Authority, Jerusalem Municipality, the Ministry of Jerusalem and Heritage, the Ministry of Tourism, and the Ministry of Transport.

=== Stops ===
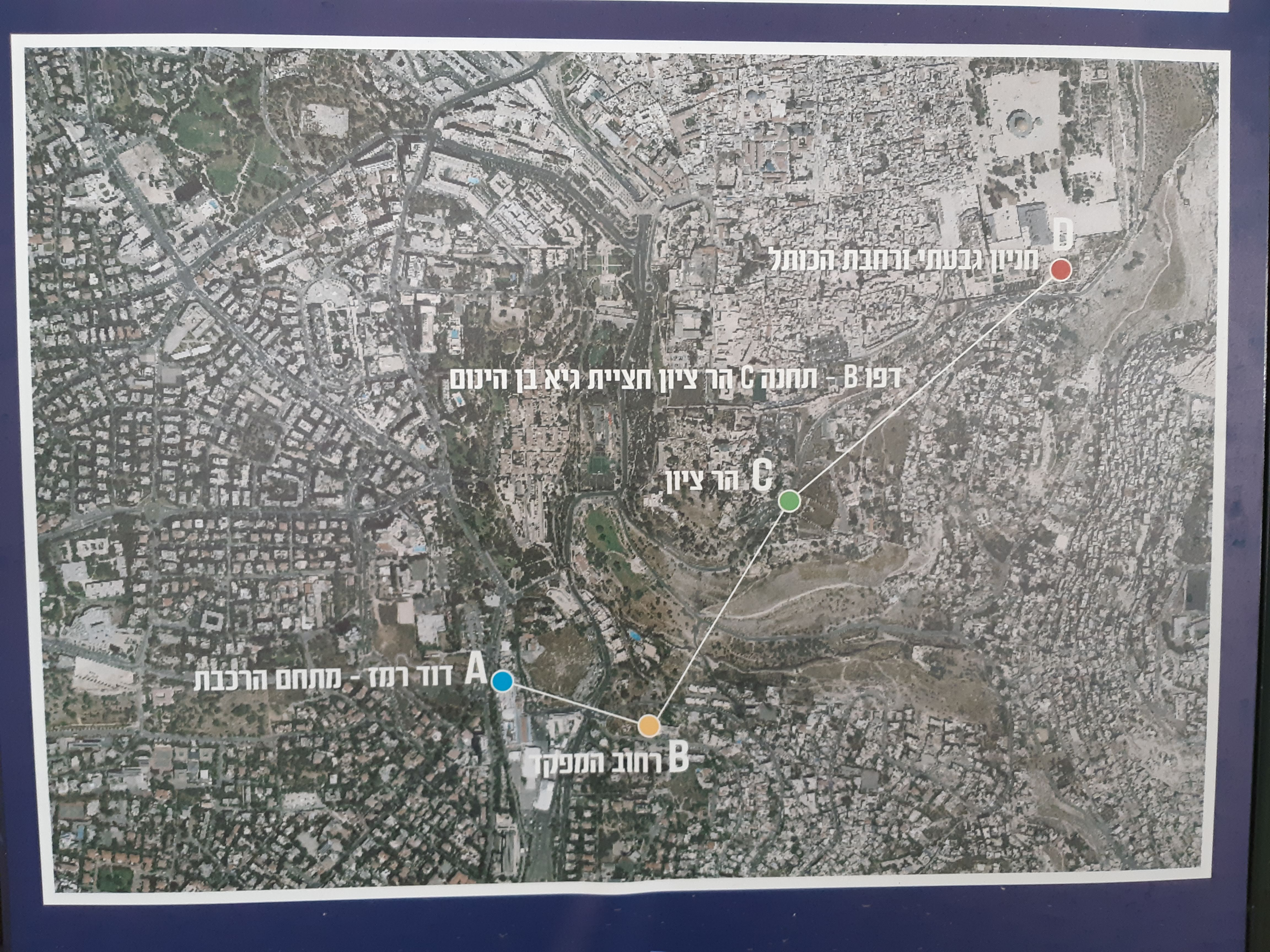
Jerusalem cableway project scheme

1. First Station
2. HaMefaked Street
3. Mount Zion
4. Dung Gate/Western Wall

== Controversy ==
The project has been opposed by Israeli ministers of Transportation and Environment Merav Michaeli and Tamar Zandberg. It was also opposed by Society for the Protection of Nature in Israel.

== Historical Cable Cars ==
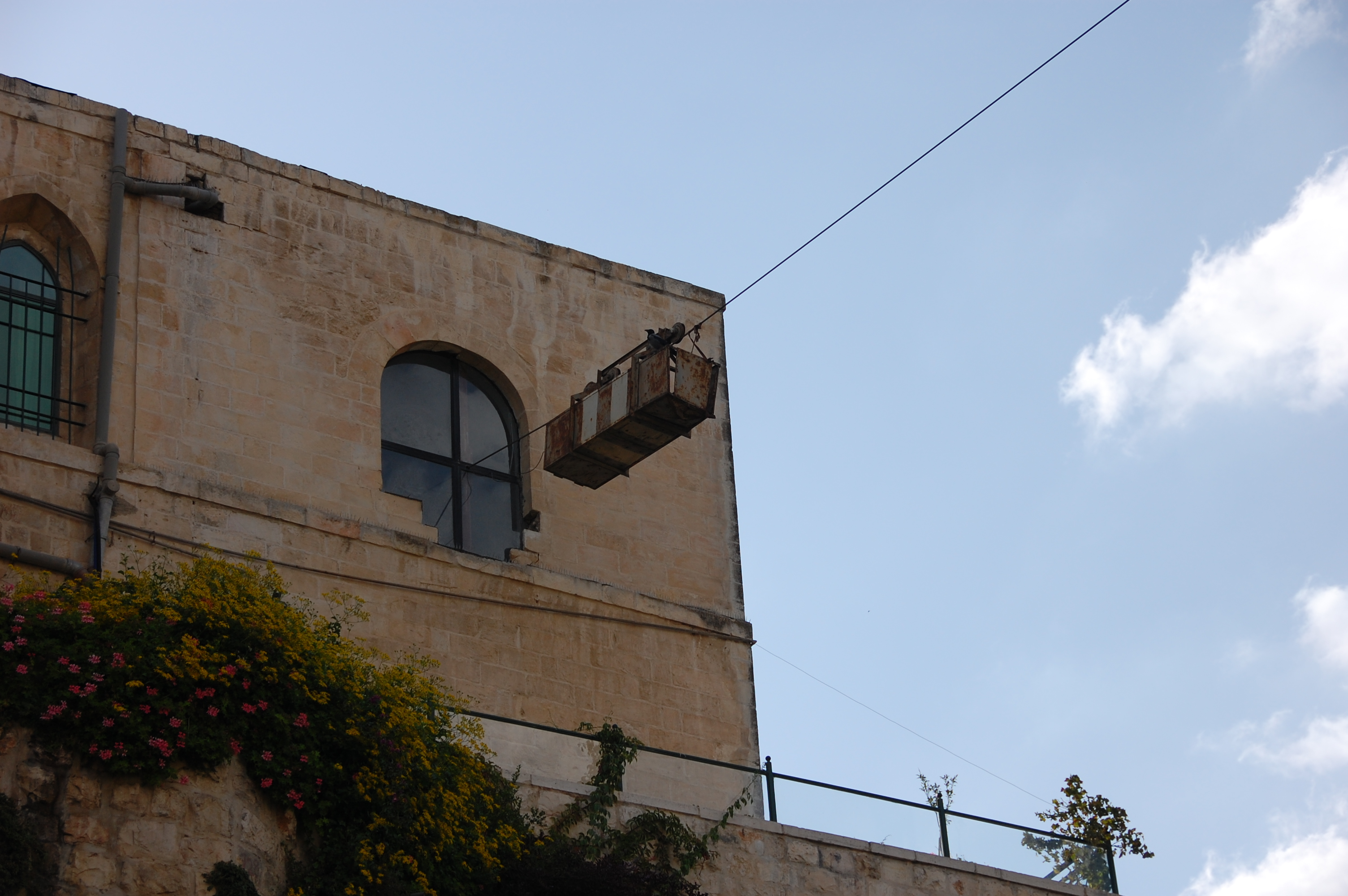
Historical Cable Car

During the 1948 Palestine war, the Etzioni Brigade built a secret cable car between the Mount Zion Hospital (a few minutes away from the First Station) to the Bishop Gobat School (today the Jerusalem University College) on the other side of the Valley of Hinnom, to transport wounded and supplies. The project was code names "Derech Avshalom". The cable car was used regularly for about six months, until the armistice agreements were signed. After that, the cable car was a military secret, and remained usable until the Six Day War, when it became redundant with the unification of the two parts of the city.

The existence of the cable car remained a secret from the public until 1972, when it was decided to commemorate it in a museum. Entrance to the cable car museum is by prior arrangement with the hotel's security department.
