= Moshe Lion =

Israeli politician (born 1961)

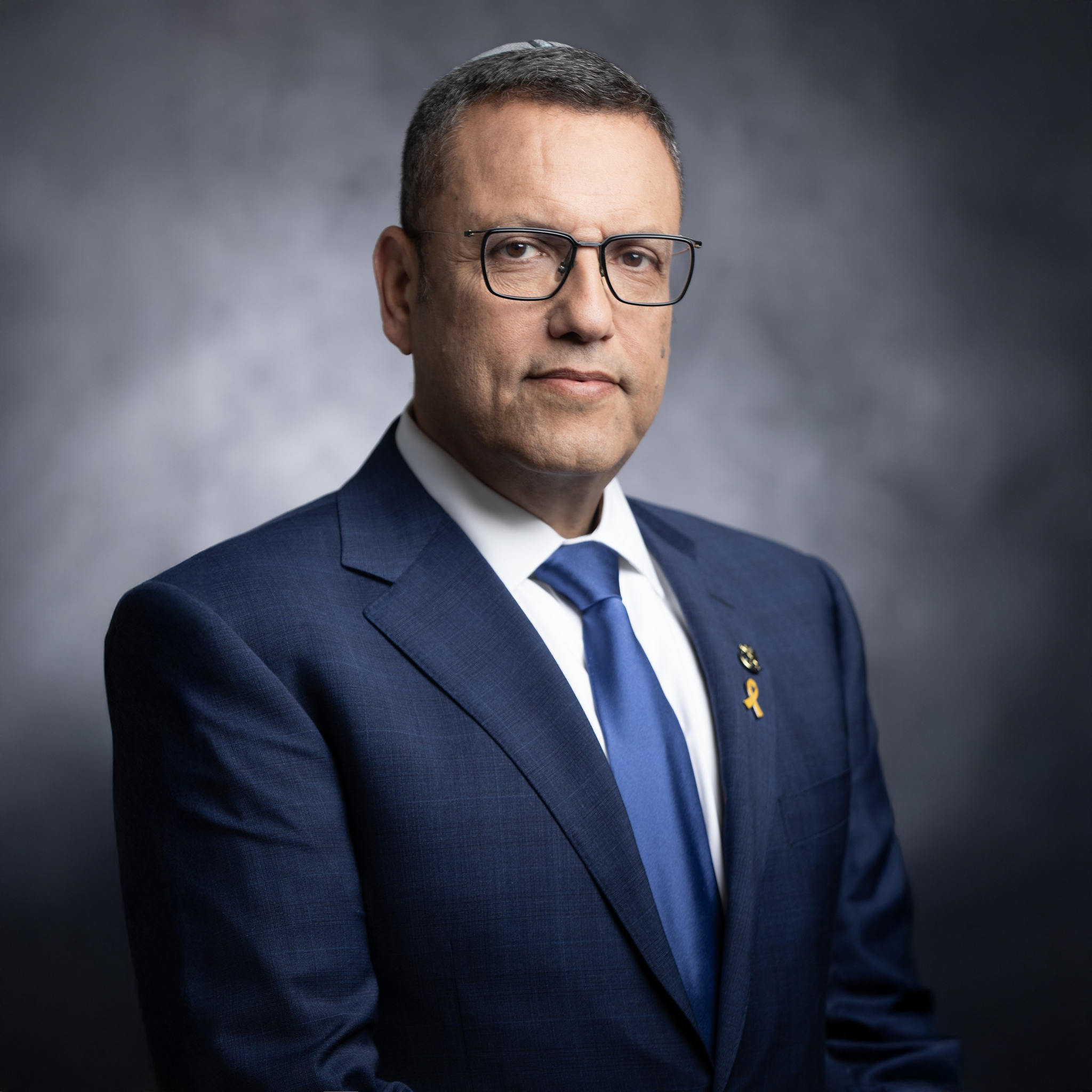
- Moshe Lion in 2024

Mayor of Jerusalem
- Incumbent
- Assumed office 4 December 2018
- Preceded by: Nir Barkat

Personal details
- Born: 6 October 1961 (age 65) Florentin, Tel Aviv, Israel
- Party: Likud
- Spouse: Stavit
- Children: 4
- Education: Bar-Ilan University

Moshe Lion, or Moshe Leon (Hebrew: משה ליאון, born 6 October 1961), is an Israeli politician who is currently the Mayor of Jerusalem. He previously served as a member of the Jerusalem City Council, director-general of the Prime Minister's Office, Chairman of the Israel Railways, and head of the Jerusalem Development Authority.

== Early life ==
Moshe Lion was born in the Florentin neighborhood of Tel Aviv, Israel, and attended Zeitlin High School. His father's family comes from Thessaloniki, while his mother has roots in Aden, Yemen. As a child, he moved with his family to Givatayim. Lion served in the Israel Defence Forces, where he was assigned to the military chaplaincy and sang with the IDF rabbinical choir. He occasionally still leads synagogue services. Lion graduated with a BA in economics and accounting from Bar-Ilan University, and interned in the office of Avigdor Yitzhaki, receiving his CPA in 1990. His brother, Dr. Nissim Lion, is a lecturer in the Department of Sociology and Anthropology at Bar-Ilan University.

== Professional career ==
In 1991, Lion founded Yitzhaki & Co., together with Avigdor Yitzhaki and two other partners. Among his clients was the Likud movement, which he advised following their economic losses after losing the 1992 Knesset elections. He retired in 2017.

In July 2014, he was appointed chairman of the board of directors of the Mayanei Hayeshua Medical Center in Bnei Brak.

== Public career ==
In 1996, Lion was appointed managing director of the Prime Minister's Office of Benjamin Netanyahu, also becoming his economic adviser, serving in those roles till 1999.

From 2003–2006, he was appointed chairman of the Israel Railways after having previously worked with the Ports and Railways Authority. Lion finished his term in 2006, after his term was not extended.

In 2008, he was appointed chairman of the Jerusalem Development Authority. Under his tenure, the First Station train complex in Jerusalem was completed.

== Political career ==
Lion was chosen to help negotiate the forming of a government coalition following the Israeli elections of 2013, in the aftermath of which the Likud and Yisrael Beiteinu parties joined together.

In 2013, Lion ran for mayor of Jerusalem, receiving 45% of the vote, but lost to Nir Barkat. The Likud party under his leadership received one mandate, and he became a member of the Jerusalem City Council on its behalf.

In August 2015, Lion joined the municipal coalition and the faction of Mayor Nir Barkat. As part of the coalition agreement signed between the two, he began to serve as a member of the city administration, and as the holder of the community management portfolio.

On 25 March 2018, Lion announced his intention to run for mayor of Jerusalem in the 2018 Jerusalem mayoral election. During the campaign, Lion stated that he opposed the Netanyahu government's plan, put forward by Jerusalem Affairs Minister and campaign challenger Ze'ev Elkin, to erect a barrier dividing East Jerusalem from the rest of the city.

Despite his broad Haredi political support, a coalition of Hasidic and extremist-Haredi Jerusalem Faction leaders declined to endorse Lion, citing his close ties to politician Avigdor Lieberman. Lieberman advanced legislation to draft Haredis into the army, making Lion more likely to "secularize" Jerusalem, according to the Hasidic coalition.

In the six-candidate general election held on 30 October 2018, Lion garnered 33% of the vote, while fellow Jerusalem city councilman Ofer Berkovitch finished in second place, with 29%. This earned them spots in a run-off election scheduled two weeks later, because according to election laws, candidates in municipal races must gain at least 40% of the vote in order to win. On 13 November, Lion won the run-off election with 50.85% of the vote, to Berkovitch's 49.15%, thereby becoming the first mayor of Jerusalem of Sephardi descent.

In the 2024 Jerusalem municipal election held on February 27, 2024, Lion was re-elected for a second term with a landslide victory, securing 81.5% of the vote against challenger Yossi Havilio. During the Gaza war, Lion directed the municipality's efforts to absorb tens of thousands of evacuees from northern and southern Israel who were housed in Jerusalem's hotels. Under his administration, the city also accelerated the development of the "Silicon Wadi" project in East Jerusalem and the continued expansion of the Jerusalem Light Rail network.

Political offices
Preceded by Nir Barkat	Mayor of Jerusalem; 2018–present	Incumbent
