= Coat of arms of Jerusalem =

Coat of arms of Jerusalem may refer to:

- the medieval coat of arms of the Kingdom of Jerusalem, see Jerusalem cross
- the modern Emblem of Jerusalem, the Israeli symbol of the city of Jerusalem
