= 2013 Jerusalem mayoral election =

- 3 October 2013
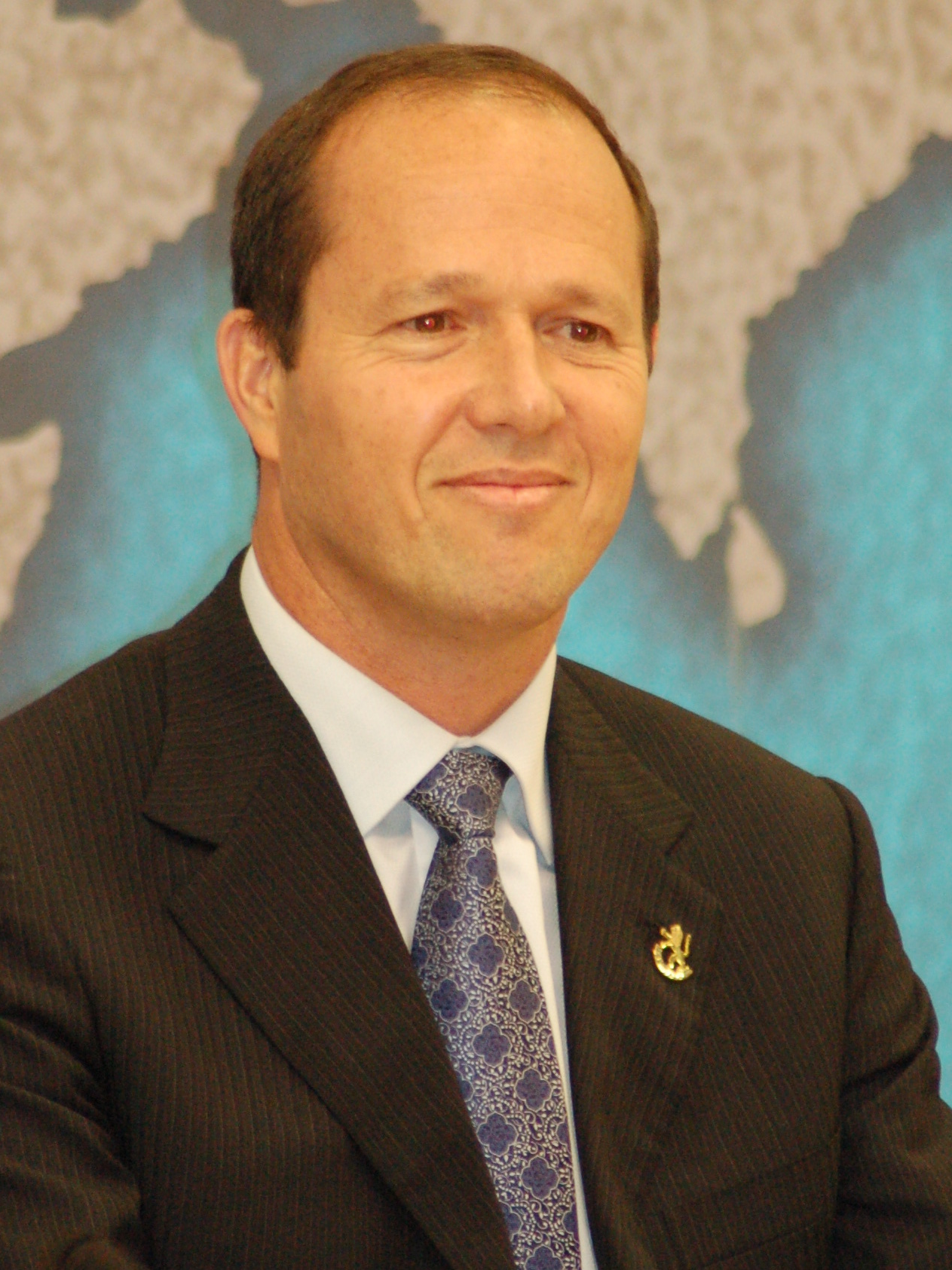

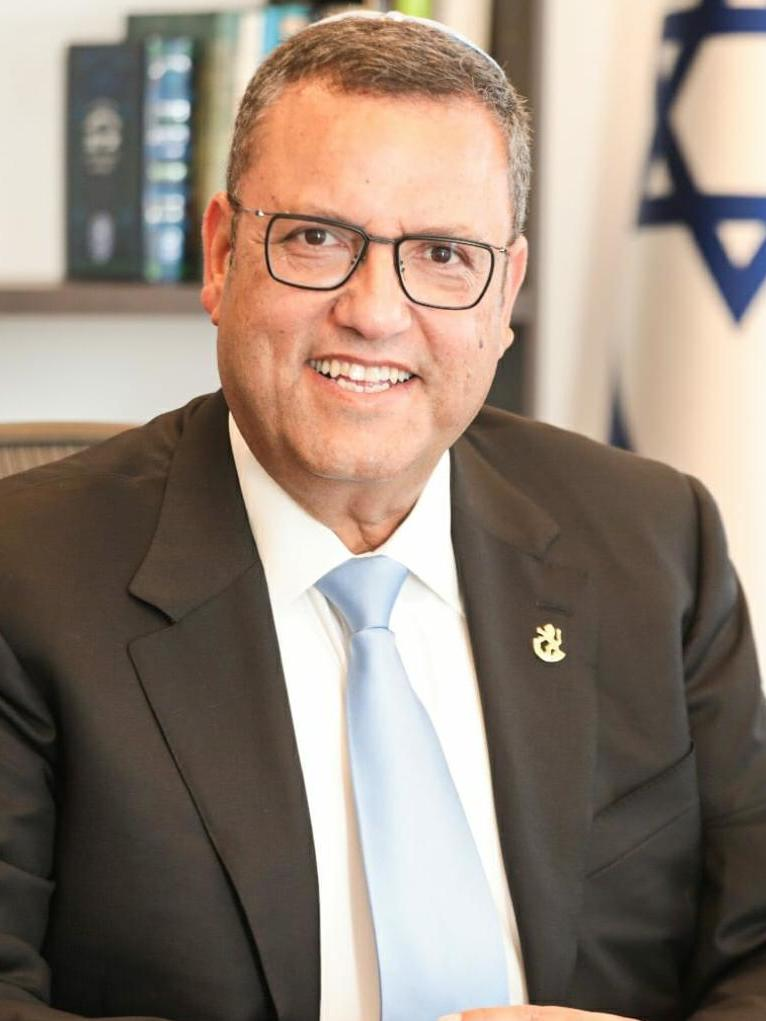
Candidate	Nir Barkat	Moshe Lion
Party	Jerusalem Will Succeed	Likud Yisrael Beiteinu
Popular vote	111,108	95,411
Percentage	51.91%	44.57%
Mayor before election
Nir Barkat
Independent politician
Elected mayor
Nir Barkat
Independent politician

The 2013 Jerusalem mayoral election was held on 2 October, 2013, and saw the reelection of Nir Barkat.

The election was part of the 2013 Israeli municipal elections.

== Campaigning ==
Lion was regarded as the candidate of the far-right and was strongly linked to Avigdor Lieberman. The candidate of Likud-Yisrael Beiteinu (an alliance between the Likud party led by Prime Minister Benjamin Netanyahu and the Yisrael Beiteinu party led by Lieberman), he was regarded as Lieberman's candidate. It was believed that Lieberman had hoped that a Lion victory would bolster his chances of potentially challenging Netanyahu's leadership. Pundits posited that Haredi opponents of Netanyahu's government were supporting Lion in hopes a victory for him would help provide momentum to topple Netanyahu's coalition in the Knesset. Also supporting Lion was Aryeh Deri, the chairman of the Shas party. Lion did not receive the support of Netanyahu, who formally remained neutral in the race, but was speculated to favor Barkat.

Barkat was endorsed by the Israel Hayom newspaper. Lion was endorsed by Yedioth Ahronoth.

It was speculated that a last-minute agreement between Barkat and major sects of the city's Hasidic populace were key in delivering Barkat his reelection.

While the coinciding municipal elections in most other cities relatively attracted little attention, Jerusalem's mayoral race attracted significant attention. The election was tense and hard-fought.

== Results ==
2013 Jerusalem mayoral elections results
Candidate	Party	Votes	%
Nir Barkat (incumbent)	Jerusalem Will Succeed	111,108	51.91%
Moshe Lion	Likud-Yisrael Beiteinu	95,411	44.57%
Chaim Epstein	Jerusalem Faction	7,530	3.52%
Total		214,049	100
