= Jerusalem Development Authority =

- Abbreviation: JDA
- Formation: 1988
- Type: Statutory corporation
- Purpose: Economic development
- General Secretary: Eyal Haimovsky
- Website: www.jda.gov.il

The Jerusalem Development Authority (Hebrew: הרשות לפיתוח ירושלים), or JDA, is a joint agency of the Israeli government and the Jerusalem Municipality that works to promote and develop the economy of the city of Jerusalem. The Authority was founded by Uziel Wexler and was established as a statutory corporation under the Jerusalem Development Authority Law 1988. Teddy Kollek was one of the key figures behind its establishment.

== Overview ==
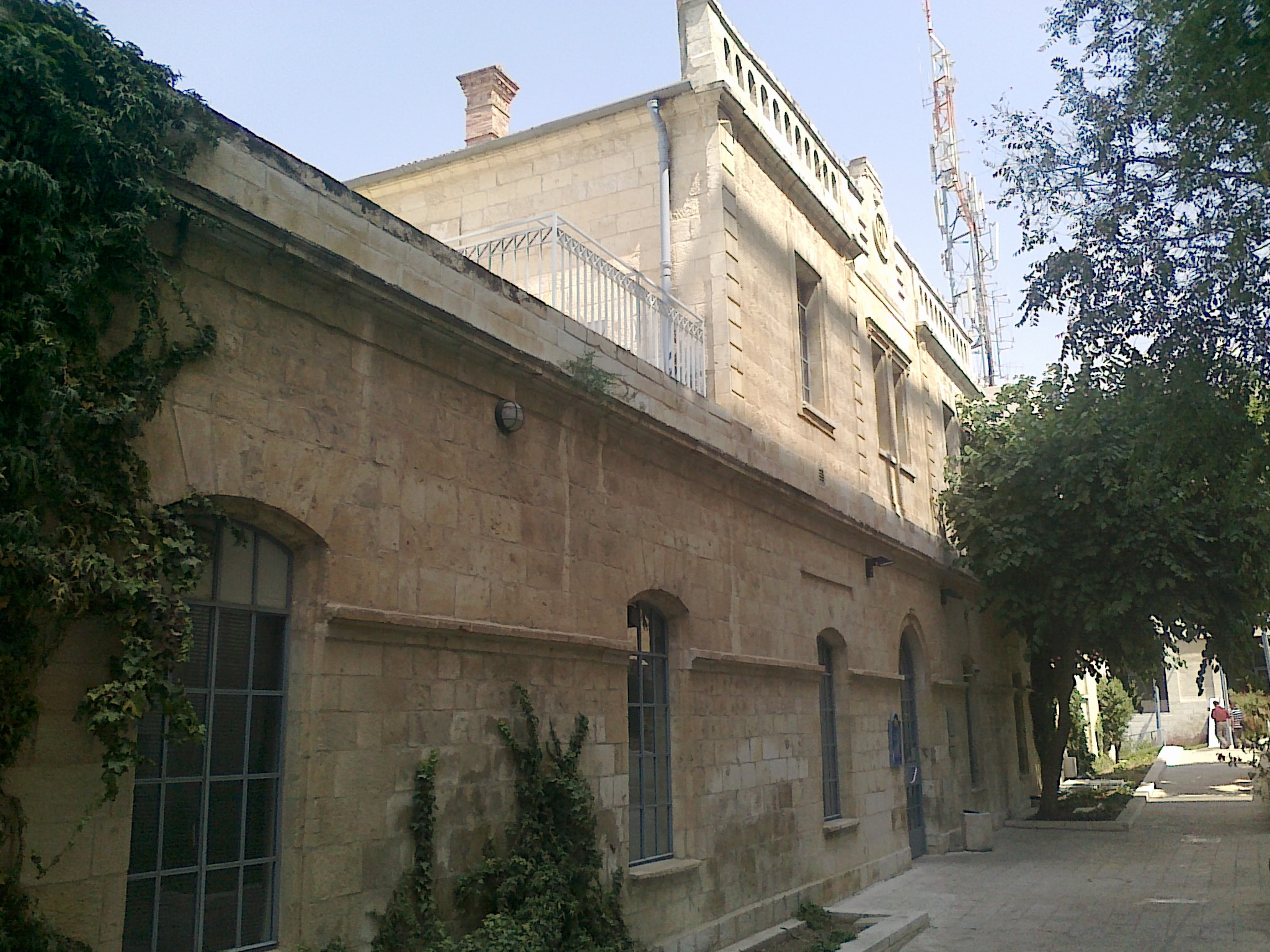
Jerusalem Development Authority offices near Safra Square

According to Ira Sharkansky, the mandate of the Jerusalem Development Authority involves "encouraging, planning, and initiating activities concerned with the economic development of Jerusalem and coordinating Jerusalem's economic development among government ministries, municipal officials, and other bodies." Established as a statutory corporation through the Jerusalem Development Authority Law 1988, by 1992 the Authority had invested over $1 billion in construction projects and initiatives relating to science and technology in Jerusalem. The Authority was among the factors influencing the decision of Teva Pharmaceuticals in 2003 to build a facility in Jerusalem. Its largest investors, according to Sharkansky, have been prominent Jews from outside Israel.

In 2001, Eden, a subsidiary of the Jerusalem Development Authority, was established with the aim of developing and reviving Jerusalem's downtown area. By early 2012, Eden had invested NIS300 million in development projects. Originally conceived as a ten-year operation, it was authorized to continue operating for an additional ten years.

=== Key people ===
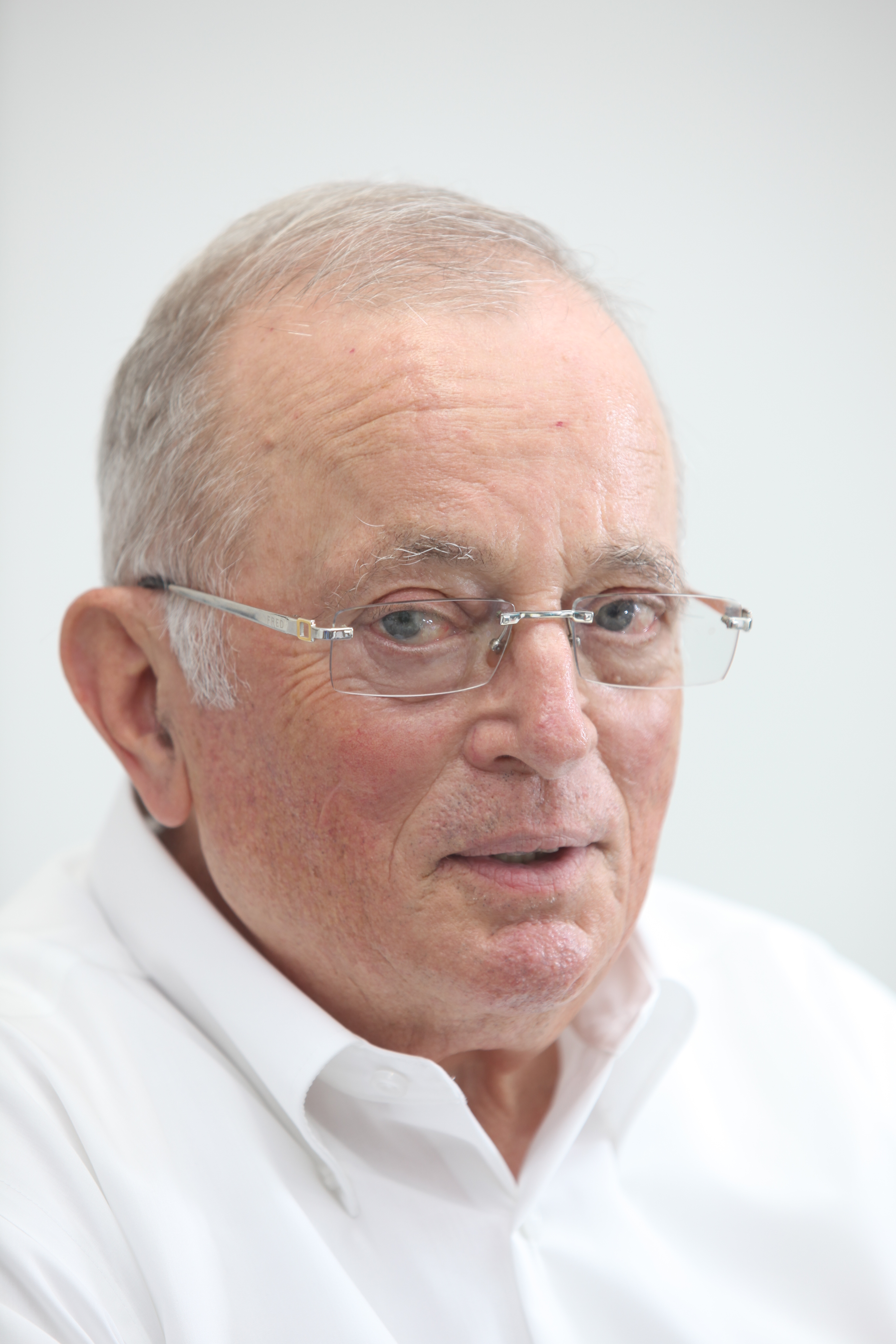
Uziel Wexler

Uziel (Uzi) Wexler, who earlier had served as treasurer of the Jerusalem municipality under mayor Teddy Kollek, founded the Jerusalem Development Authority in 1988 and served as its director from 1989 to 1994. He later served as the Authority's chairman from 1997 to 2003. Teddy Kollek was a key figure behind the Authority's establishment.

Moshe Goldstein, once mayor of Ma'aleh Adumim, was chairman of the Authority for three years until 2008. He was replaced by Moshe Lion, former director general of the Prime Minister's Office and chairman of Israel Railways. In 2013, Lion resigned in order to run for mayor of Jerusalem.

Moty Hazan, who replaced Israel Bargil as director of the Jerusalem Development Authority in 2010, began his involvement with the Jerusalem municipality as a student in the mid-1990s working at the city's call center. Over time he was promoted to a position with the treasury department's budget committee and later to the position of deputy treasurer. Credited for his contribution to balancing the city's budgets and for his involvement in the city's recovery program, by 2010 he was City Hall's preferred candidate for the position of director of the Authority.

=== International cooperation ===
The Jerusalem Development Authority reached an agreement in 2005 to collaborate with a firm in the Netherlands to promote innovation in the fields of biotechnology, information technology and tourism. The joint venture was conceived as part of the Israel–Europe R&D Directorate.

During a five-day mission to Israel of figures from San Antonio, Texas' business and academic community in 2011, led by San Antonio mayor Julian Castro, the Jerusalem Development Authority's BioJerusalem signed a memorandum of intent with the president of BioMed SA, a San Antonio-based nonprofit initiative operating in the healthcare and bioscience sectors.

== Initiatives ==
=== BioJerusalem ===
In 2003 the Jerusalem Development Authority, together with Teva Pharmaceuticals and other investors, founded BioLineRx, a drug development company with headquarters in Jerusalem. In 2006, with additional funding from its investors, BioLineRx launched BioLine Innovations Jerusalem, Israel's first biotechnology incubator.

The Jerusalem Development Authority announced the launch of BioJerusalem in mid-2007. The initiative offers monetary incentives to biotechnology companies who relocate their facilities to Jerusalem or set up operations there.

=== AcademiCity ===
In cooperation with Ruach Hadasha, a student-oriented nonprofit, and in an effort to encourage students to remain in Jerusalem after having completed their academic studies, as of 2009 the Jerusalem Development Authority acts as an interface between college and university graduates and more than 100 Jerusalem-based institutions offering internship programs. In addition, students are offered benefits and monetary incentives if they choose to live downtown and commit to remaining in the city after completing their studies.

In 2011 a plan by the Jerusalem Development Authority to expand and restructure Jerusalem's academic landscape was announced. Dubbed AcademiCity (Hebrew: עיר.אקדמיה), the plan called for the construction of a school for overseas students in downtown Jerusalem, the relocation to Jerusalem of Hebrew University's Agricultural Department in Rehovot, the establishment in Jerusalem of a branch of the Israel Defense Forces' Command and Staff College, and the establishment of a Machon Lev campus for girls in Jerusalem's Pisgat Ze'ev neighborhood.

=== Hamshushalayim ===
Hamshushalayim (Hebrew: חמשושלים) is an annual cultural festival initiated by the Jerusalem Development Authority together with the Prime Minister's Office and the Jerusalem municipality. The festival takes its name from the word hamshush, military slang meaning "weekend beginning on Thursday," combined with the Hebrew name for Jerusalem, Yerushalayim. It lasts for three weekends during the month of December and includes free entrance to museums, guided tours, musical performances, and discounted hotels. 480,000 people were drawn to hamshushalayim in 2008.

=== Jerusalem Festival of Lights ===
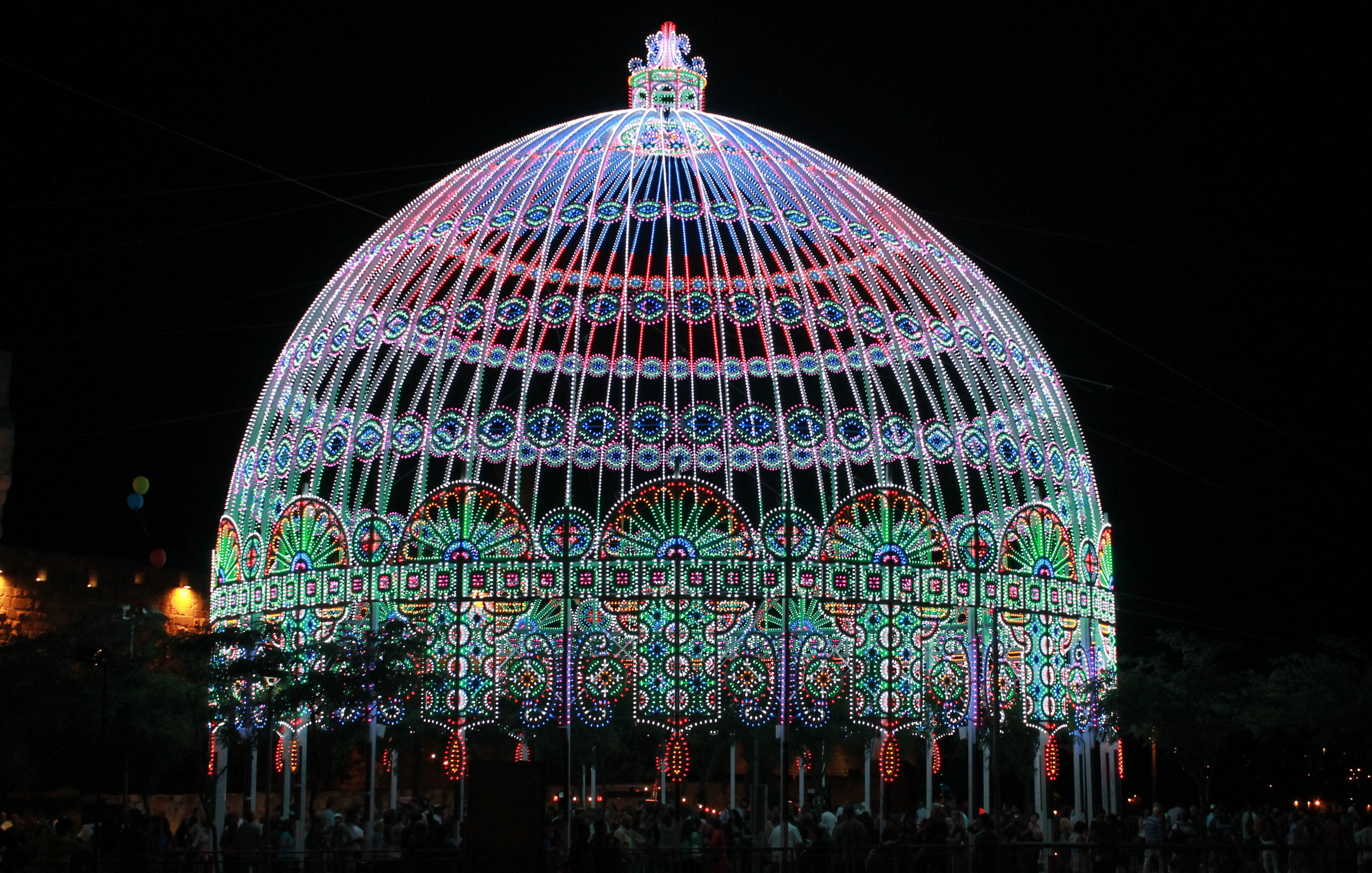
"Cupola" by Luminarie De Cagna, outside Jaffa Gate (2012)

The Jerusalem Festival of Lights is a joint initiative of the Jerusalem Development Authority, the Jerusalem Municipality, the Prime Minister's Office, and the Ariel Company. First launched in 2009, the festival takes place annually in and around Jerusalem's Old City and features works of light art created by various artists.

== Projects ==
=== Jerusalem parks ===
The Jerusalem Development Authority has proposed the creation of a network of green areas to surround the northern and eastern parts of the Old City of Jerusalem. The areas, totaling 2,500 dunams (600 acres) in size, would include bike paths and hiking paths making it possible to reach the Pool of Siloam from Mount Scopus.

- The King's Garden archeological park is a 12-acre park proposed for development in what is today the Arab neighborhood of al-Bustan in East Jerusalem's Silwan neighborhood. The designated area is widely accepted as the site of the garden mentioned in the Song of Songs book of the Hebrew Bible. The plan for the park calls for the demolition of 22 Palestinian homes constructed without permits on land originally zoned as parkland while legalizing 66 others. The Secretary General of the United Nations said the removal of the 22 homes would itself be illegal.
- The Slopes of Mount Scopus national park is a 73.2-hectare (181-acre) park proposed for development in the hills between the Arab neighborhoods of Isawiya and at-Tur in East Jerusalem. Most of the land is privately owned by residents of the two neighborhoods. The proposal was opposed by city council member Meir Margalit, who called it a pretext for the future establishment of Israeli settlements. The Jerusalem Development Authority has said the park is important in order to preserve the Isawiya–a-Tur area's last remaining stretch of undeveloped land, to safeguard it from acts of vandalism, and to develop tourism.

=== Jerusalem Old City walls ===
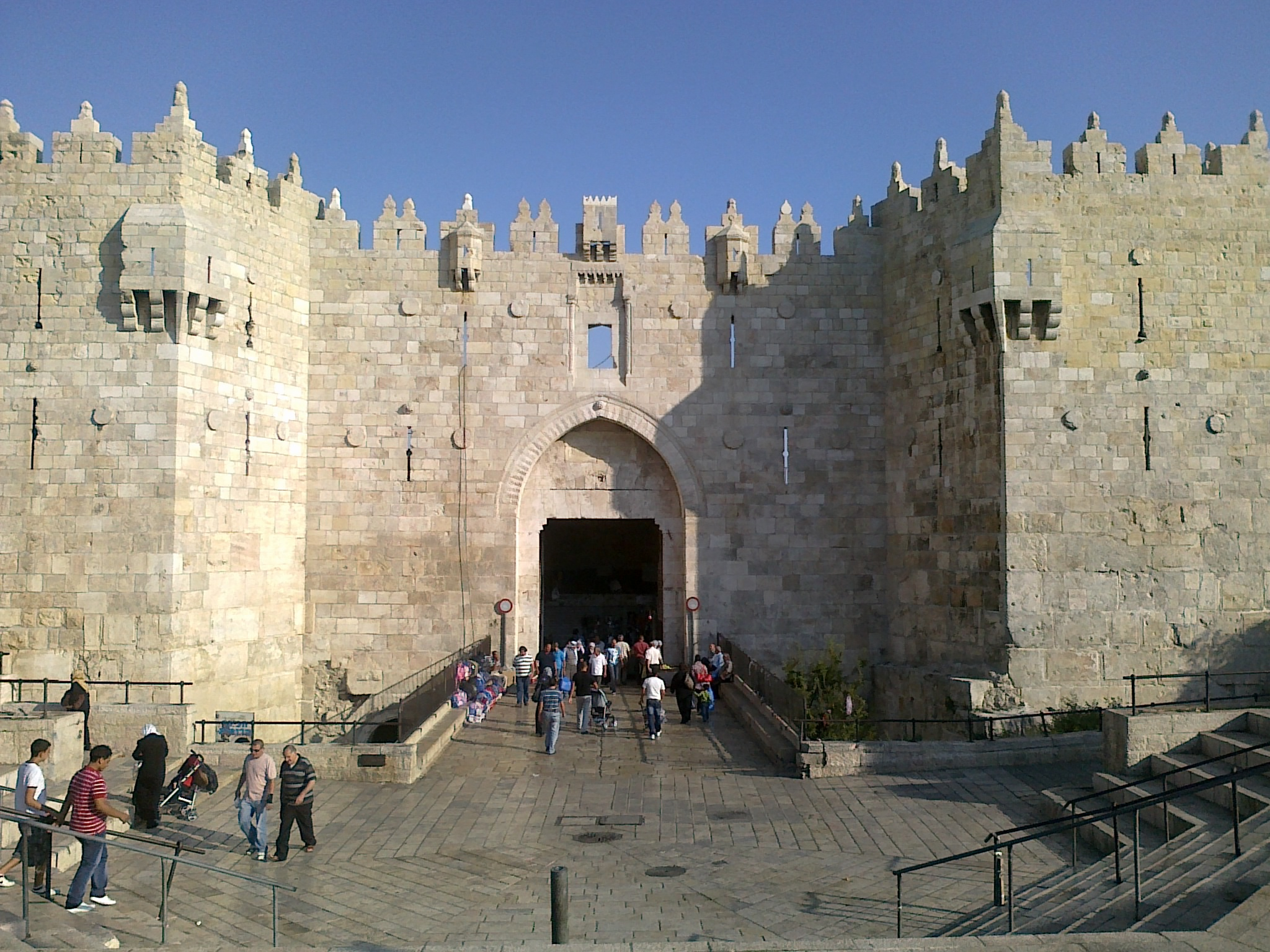
Damascus Gate, September 2011, shortly after the Jerusalem Development Authority's restoration work

The Jerusalem Development Authority administered the Jerusalem City Walls Conservation Project in cooperation with the Prime Minister's Office and the Israel Antiquities Authority beginning in 2007. Within the framework of the project, by the summer of 2011 half of the Old City walls had undergone cleaning and restoration treatment. Six months of restoration work performed at Zion Gate culminated in a moving rededication ceremony in July 2008 attended by veterans of the Palmach, 468 years after the gate had originally been built. Two months of restoration work performed at Jaffa Gate were completed in April 2010, and an official rededication ceremony was held to mark the occasion, 472 years after the gate was first dedicated. The restoration of Herod's Gate was completed in June 2010, whereupon a reinauguration ceremony was held attended by the Old City's Nawar mukhtar, Abed-Alhakim Mohammed Deeb Salim. The restoration work at Damascus Gate, lasting more than a year and completed in August 2011, involved the reconstruction of part of a crenellated turret damaged in the Six-Day War. The project, lasting a total of five years, was declared complete in September 2012 after restoration work performed at Lions' Gate – the seventh and last gate to be restored – was concluded.

=== Einstein museum ===
In 2012 the Israeli Cabinet approved the establishment in Jerusalem of a museum dedicated to the legacy of Albert Einstein. A joint project of Hebrew University and the Jerusalem Development Authority, the museum will showcase thousands of documents currently stored at Hebrew University illustrating among other things Einstein's extensive involvement in the Zionist movement in the 1900s.

=== Safdie Plan ===
The Safdie Plan was a project initiated by the Israel Land Administration and the Jerusalem Development Authority during the term of Ehud Olmert as mayor of Jerusalem. It called for the construction of 20,000 housing units on undeveloped land to the west of the city. Environmentalists mobilized to have the Safdie Plan scrapped, and it was suspended by Mayor Uri Lupolianski in 2007.

== See also ==
- Erel Margalit
