= Aryeh King =

Israeli right-wing activist and politician

- אריה קינג
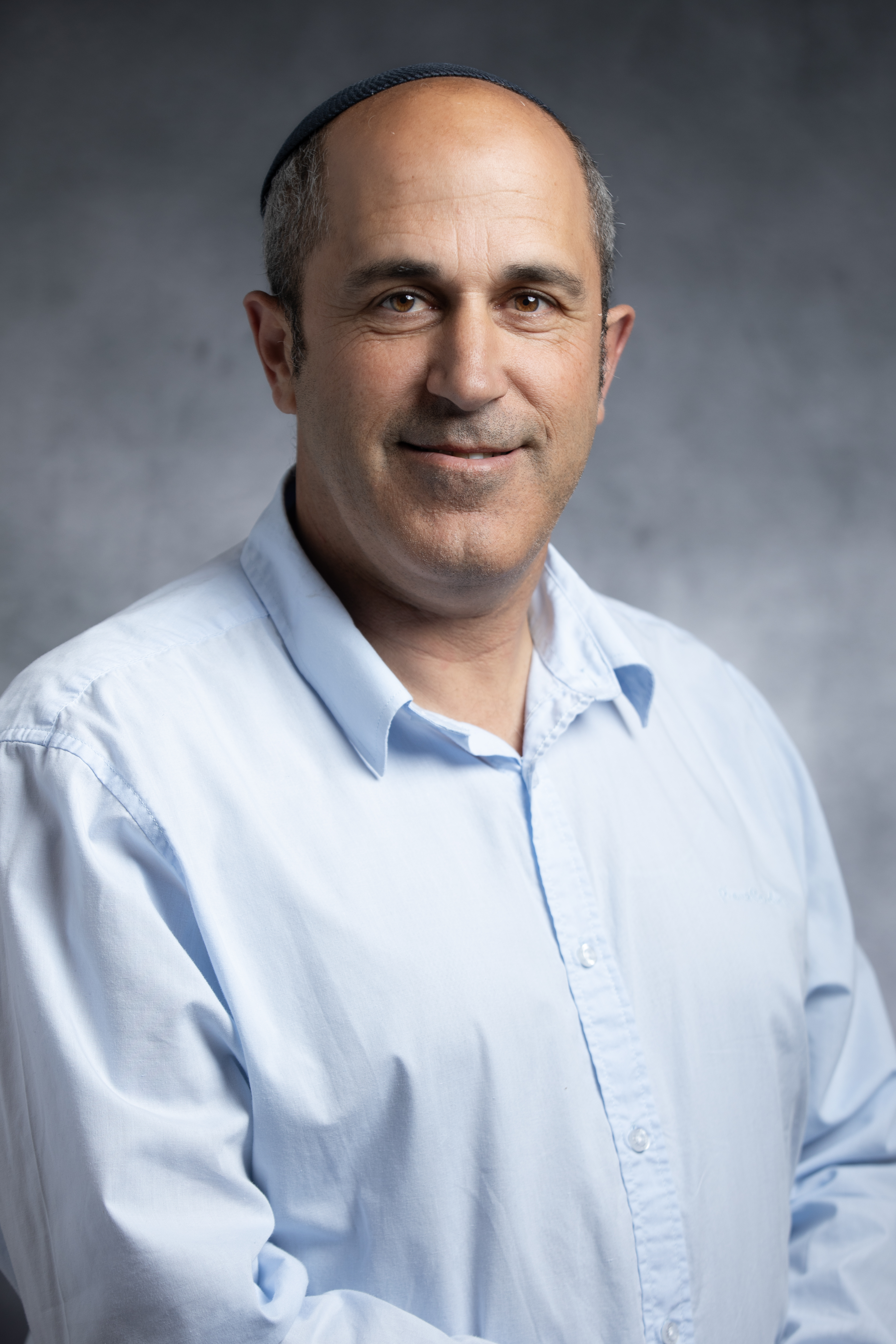

Deputy Mayor of Jerusalem

Personal details
- Born: 7 November 1973 (age 52) Alumim, Israel

Arieh Yitzhak King (Hebrew: אריה יצחק קינג; born November 7, 1973) is an Israeli right-wing activist and politician who currently serves as Deputy Mayor of Jerusalem and the founder of the Israel Land Fund. King is prominent in his activities regarding Jewish residence in East Jerusalem.

== Biography ==
Arieh King's parents immigrated from England, and settled on Kibbutz Alumim in the Negev. King enlisted in the Navy, continued his military service in the Givati Brigade, with the rank of lieutenant, and ended up in the "Samson" undercover unit. King holds a bachelor's degree in political science, Islam, and the Middle East from the Hebrew University of Jerusalem. King lives in the Ma'ale HaZeitim neighborhood on the Mount of Olives. He is married to Liska (Shirley), and is the father of six children.

== Political activism ==
In 1997, he began public activity focused on attempts to Judaize East Jerusalem by opening the "Bureau of Public Inquiries in East Jerusalem". In 2008, he founded the Israel Land Fund, which works to acquire property from non-Jewish owners considered as hostile and enemy elements and to fund illegal settlements . According to King, the fund was established "in response to a change in the Jewish National Fund's policy, according to which the JNF began assisting in the establishment of an Arab city near Ramallah".

King served as chairman of the National Union of Jerusalem from 2006 to 2012. In the 2008 Jerusalem City Council elections, the representative of the National Union was on a joint list with the Jewish House (NRP), and was placed fifth on the joint list. In the run-up to the elections to the Nineteenth Knesset, the Center Party of Hope chose King for second place among the party's candidates, and he was placed fourth on the Power List for Israel, which did not pass the electoral threshold.

== Controversies ==
In 2015, King purchased an abandoned church compound on the Jerusalem–Hebron Road, near the Al‑Arroub refugee camp. After acquiring the property, he began refurbishing the buildings with the intention of establishing a Jewish settlement outpost. A perimeter fence was erected around the site despite a stop‑work injunction issued by the Civil Administration, which raised questions about compliance with planning regulations.

The compound is located immediately adjacent to the al‑‘Arroub refugee camp, a Palestinian community, which heightened tensions between local residents and the activists. Investigative reporting indicated that the property may have been transferred through intermediary entities, which critics said obscured the settler organizations’ involvement. Observers noted that establishing a presence at this site could help extend Jewish settlement continuity between Gush Etzion and the Hebron area, making the acquisition strategically and politically significant.

In 2019, King called for the removal of the walls of the Old City of Jerusalem, stating that they were built by a "Muslim tyrant" and that their removal would connect parts of the city.

In February 2022, King was involved in public tensions in the Sheikh Jarrah neighbourhood, where ongoing legal and social disputes drew international attention. Reports described confrontations which included King and other figures during heightened tensions over property and eviction issues in the area.

During U.S. Secretary of State Antony Blinken’s visit to Jerusalem in March 2022, King called on him to leave the capital, tweeting that Blinken was “not welcome at all” and suggesting that he intended “to create provocation”.

In January 2026, during the demolition of a United Nations Relief and Works Agency for Palestine Refugees (UNRWA) compound in East Jerusalem, Jerusalem deputy mayor Arieh King was present at the site. According to the BBC, King described UNRWA as a "Nazi" organisation and stated that he "didn't care" what the UN had to say about international law.

Following the demolition, King posted online remarks in which he went further, calling for the killing of UNRWA staff members and again referring to them as "Nazis".

== Statements on Gaza (2023) ==
In December 2023, following the October 7 attacks, King called for the IDF to "pick up the pace" and continue operations in Gaza, referring to Palestinian civilians as "Muslim Nazis". A post on X (Twitter), later deleted for violating platform rules, advocated using bulldozers for this purpose. King stated that the captured individuals were neither human beings nor human animals, but "subhuman", and should be treated as such. He invoked a biblical reference to Amalek, urging to "Eradicate the memory of Amalek, and never forget", aligning with a historical call against an ancient enemy.
