= Ira Sharkansky =

Political scientist

Ira Sharkansky (Hebrew: אירה שרקנסקי; born 1938, Fall River, Massachusetts) is professor emeritus of political science and public administration at Hebrew University of Jerusalem. He is a prolific author on policy and politics in Israel and the United States. He regularly blogs for The Jerusalem Post and San Diego Jewish World.

== Academic career ==
Sharkansky graduated from Wesleyan University, writing his thesis on "The Portuguese of Fall River: A Study of Ethnic Acculturation". He earned his PhD in political science at the University of Wisconsin–Madison in 1964. His dissertation was published as "Four Agencies and an Appropriations Subcommittee: A comparative study of budget relations". His first academic post was as assistant professor at Ball State University that same year; he subsequently held assistant professorships at Florida State University (1965–1966) and University of Georgia (1966–1968). From 1968 to 1971 he was an associate professor at the University of Wisconsin, where he advanced to full professor from 1971 to 1975. In 1975 he moved to the Hebrew University of Jerusalem, where he was a full professor in the political science and public administration departments until 2005 and professor emeritus thereafter.

In 1979 he became a fellow of the National Academy of Public Administration.

== Personal life ==
Sharkansky resides in the French Hill neighborhood of Jerusalem. He is married to Varda, and his children are Stefan, Erica, Tamar, and Mattan. Stefan maintains a blog called the Shark Blog, to which Professor Sharkansky contributes.

== Selected bibliography ==
- Politics and Planning in the Holy City. Transaction Publishers. 2007. ISBN 978-0765803818. (with Gedalia Auerbach)
- Governing Israel: Chosen People, Promised Land, & Prophetic Tradition. Transaction Publishers. 2005. ISBN 0765802775.
- Coping with Terror: An Israeli perspective. Lexington Books. 2003. ISBN 0739106848.
- Politics and Policymaking: In search of simplicity. Lynne Rienner Publishers. 2002. ISBN 1588260844.
- The Politics of Religion and the Religion of Politics: Looking at Israel. Lexington Books. 2000. ISBN 0739101099.
- Ambiguity, Coping, and Governance: Israeli experiences in politics, religion, and policymaking. Greenwood Publishing Group. 1999. ISBN 0275967182.
- Policy Making in Israel: Routines for simple problems and coping with the complex. University of Pittsburgh Press. 1997. ISBN 0822956330. "ira sharkansky."
- Rituals of Conflict: Religion, politics, and public policy in Israel. Lynne Rienner Publishers. 1996. ISBN 1555876781.
- Governing Jerusalem: Again on the world's agenda. Wayne State University Press. 1996. ISBN 0814325920. "ira sharkansky."
- Israel and Its Bible: A political analysis. Garland Publishing. 1996. ISBN 0815320213.
- Ancient and Modern Israel: An exploration of political parallels. SUNY Press. 1991. ISBN 0791405486.
- The Political Economy of Israel. Transaction Publishers. 1987. ISBN 0887381170.
- What Makes Israel Tick: How domestic policy-makers cope with constraints. Nelson-Hall. 1985. ISBN 0830411062.
- The United States Revisited: A study of a still developing country. Longman. 1982. ISBN 0582282497. (2nd edition)
- Wither the state?: Politics and public enterprise in three countries. Chatham House Publishers. 1979. ISBN 0934540012.
- The Maligned State: Policy accomplishments, problems, and opportunities. McGraw Hill. 1978. ISBN 9780070564343. "Ira Sharkansky."
- Urban Politics and Public Policy. Harper & Row. 1971. ISBN 9780060440213. (with Robert L. Lineberry)
- The United States: A study of a developing country. D. McKay Co. 1975. "ira sharkansky."
- The Routines of Politics. Van Nostrand-Reinhold. 1970.
- Public Administration: Policy-making in government agencies. Markham Pub. Co. 1970. ISBN 978-0-8410-3026-8. "ira sharkansky."
- Policy Analysis in Political Science. Markham Pub. Co. 1970. ISBN 978-0-8410-3024-4. "ira sharkansky."
- Spending in the American States. Rand McNally. 1968. "Ira Sharkansky."
