= Laura Wharton =

Doctor Laura Wharton
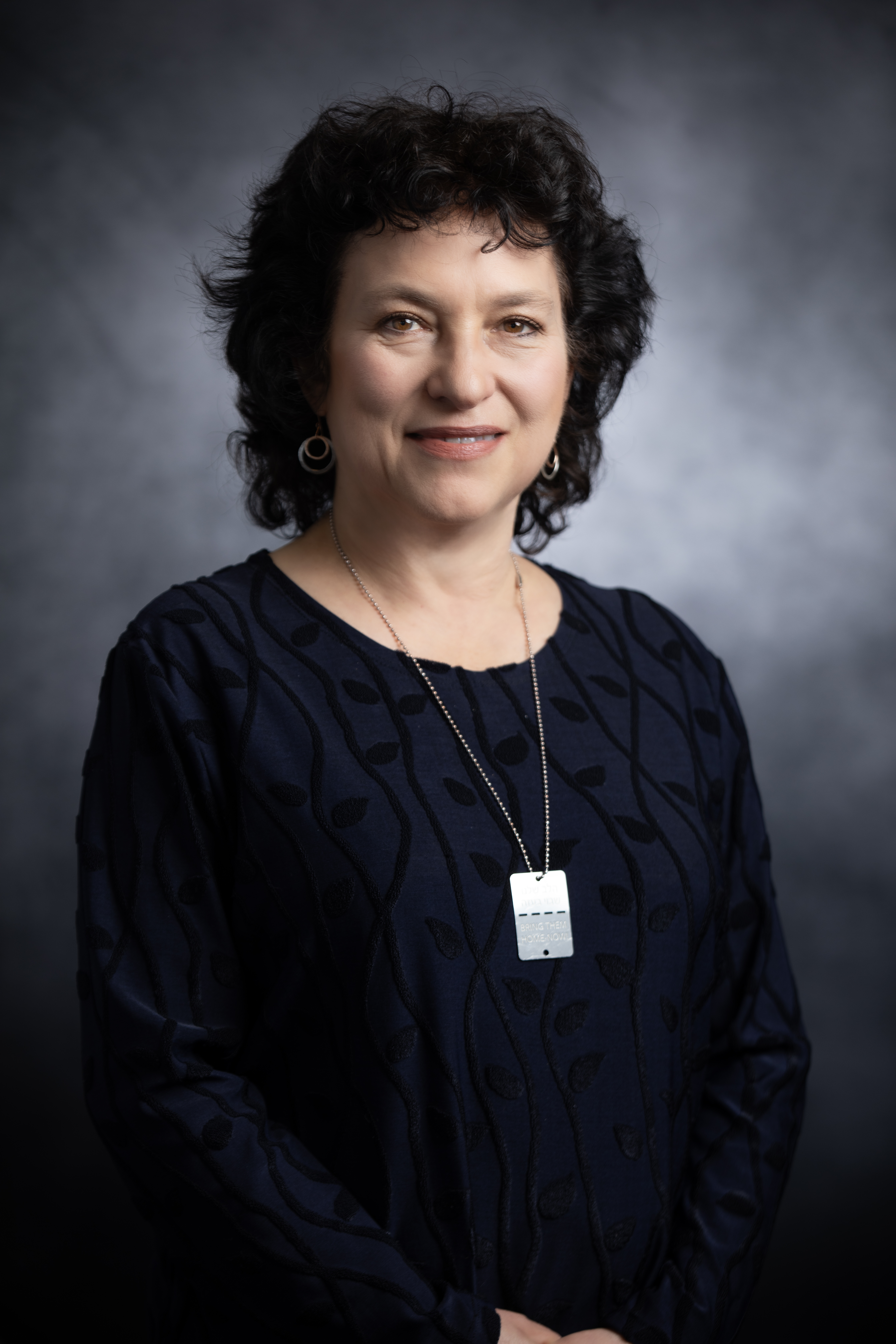
- Laura Wharton in 2023
- Born: December 21, 1962 (age 63); Tenafly, New Jersey, U.S.
- Other name: לורה ורטון
- Citizenship: American, Israeli
- Education: Harvard University, Cambridge (Political Science); The Hebrew University, Jerusalem
- Occupation: Lecturer
- Years active: 1998–present
- Employer(s): The Hebrew University, Jerusalem (since 2012)
- Known for: A Jerusalem politician
- Notable work: Doctorate about the social policy of the Mapai and the Israeli Labor Party parties
- Political party: Meretz
- Parents: Ralph Nathaniel Wharton (father); Eleanor Walden (mother)

Laura Wharton (Hebrew: לורה ורטון; born December 21, 1962) is a member of the Jerusalem City Council and a lecturer of the Political science in the Hebrew University. She serves as the chairman of the Meretz faction in The Jerusalem Union electoral list, which has been led by Yosi Havilio. Until 2024, Wharton held the portfolio for promoting women's status and gender equality, the portfolio for service quality and the portfolio for promoting pensioners' welfare. She won the Prime Minister's Award for her doctorate about the social policy of the Mapai and the Israeli Labor Party parties.

== Biography ==
Wharton was born and raised in New Jersey, the United States. Her mother, Elinor Walden, was an educator and an administrator in higher education, and her father, Ralph Wharton, practiced psychiatry and neurology at the School of Medicine at Columbia University, New York. She attended the Phillips Exeter Academy and completed a bachelor's degree in Political Science at the Harvard University. After graduating, she immigrated to Israel in 1984 and enlisted in the Israel Defense Forces, as a lone soldier. Wharton served as a corporal at the Nahal and lived in the kibbutz Kfar Blum. After her military service, she was accepted as a member in the kibbutz, and worked as a teacher of mathematics at the Emek Hahula High School. She completed her master's degree and the doctorate at the Hebrew University of Jerusalem. During her master's degree, she worked at the Davis Institute for International Relations in the Hebrew university and in the Jerusalem Institute for Policy Research. She wrote her doctoral thesis in the department of Political Science at the Hebrew university, under the guidance of the professors Itzhak Galnoor and Shlomo Avineri. The doctorate dealt with the ideological changes in the social policy of the Mapai party and the Israeli Labor Party in the 1960s, until the 1977 Israeli legislative election. Afterwards Wharton became an external lecturer at the Hebrew University of Jerusalem.

== Public life ==
Wharton was among the founders of The Public Housing Forum, which led the legislation of The Public Housing Law in 1998 by the former MK Ran Cohen from Meretz.

In 2022, Wharton was listed on Meretz's electoral list for the Knesset.
