= Ofer Berkovitch =

Leader of Jerusalem's Hitorerut political movement

- 'עופר ברקוביץ
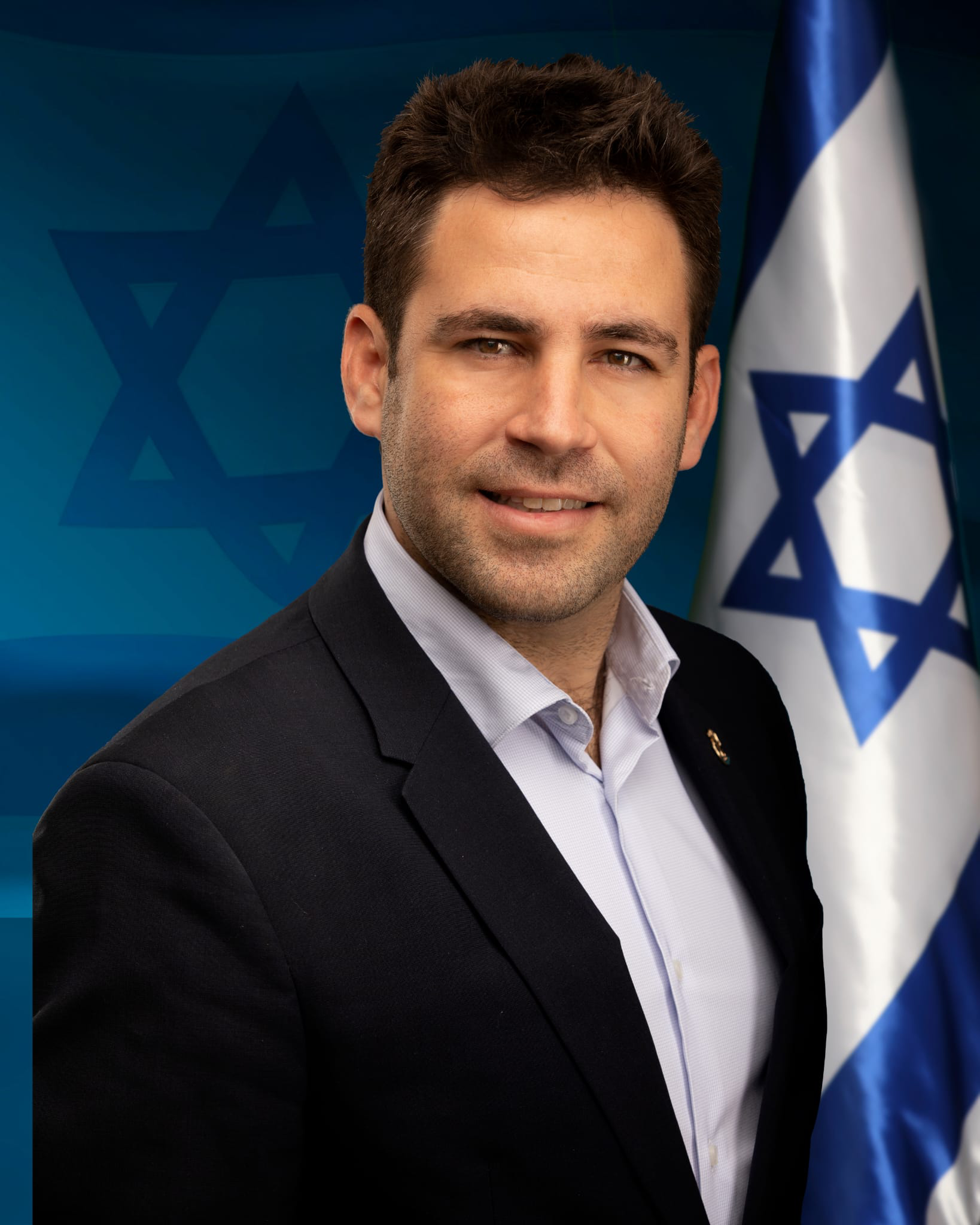
- Born: July 7, 1983 (age 42); Jerusalem, Israel
- Other name: Ofer Berkovich
- Occupation: Politician
- Years active: 2008–present
- Title: Former deputy mayor of Jerusalem

Ofer Berkovitch (Hebrew: עופר ברקוביץ'; July 7, 1983) is the founder and chairman of Jerusalem's Hitorerut in Jerusalem political movement, a member of the Jerusalem city council, and Hitorerut's 2018 candidate for Mayor of Jerusalem. Previously, Berkovitch served as Jerusalem's Deputy Mayor and has held municipal portfolios for culture, economic development, and the city center among others.

== Early life ==
Berkovitch grew up in Jerusalem's French Hill and Ramat Sharett neighborhoods. He achieved the rank of captain in the Israel Defense Forces in his regular service. Today, Berkovitch serves in the army's reserves with the rank of major. He holds a bachelor's degree in Philosophy, Politics and Economics from the Hebrew University of Jerusalem.

== Political career ==
After his discharge from the IDF, Berkovitch founded the “Hitorerut in Jerusalem” political movement with the aim of supporting the city's tolerant and creative Zionist population. The movement, which later turned into a political party, has a student club at the Hebrew University. In 2011, Berkovitch assisted in the establishment of a social movement called “Mitpakdim” with the goal of increasing the involvement of young people in politics.

=== City council member (2008–2011) ===
In Jerusalem's 2008 municipal elections, Berkovitch was first elected to the city council in a rotation with fellow Hitorerut member Meirav Cohen. In this role, he was responsible for the city's system for informal education, and he was subsequently appointed as the Chairman of the city's urban culture committee. During his tenure holding Jerusalem's youth portfolio, the city won Israel's award for best youth division in 2011.

In 2010, Berkovitch opposed the Jerusalem municipality's decision to prohibit the local Cinema City theater branch from operating on the Jewish Sabbath. In response, he and several other members of Hitorerut appealed to the Israeli Supreme Court to maintain the status quo which allowed privately owned businesses to remain open on the Sabbath, though the court eventually referred the judgement back to the municipality. In 2015, the owners of Cinema City announced that they had no intentions of operating on the Sabbath.

=== Director for "First Station" revitalization project (2012) ===
In 2012, Berkovitch became the Director of Strategy and Content for a project aimed at revitalizing Jerusalem's then-abandoned old train station complex. Today, the "First Station" serves as a center for leisure, restaurants, culture, sport, and more.

=== Deputy mayor (2013–2017) ===
In Jerusalem's municipal elections in 2013, Berkovitch led Hitorerut as they received 4 seats on the city council. Berkovitch was appointed as the city's Deputy Mayor and was appointed to oversee the municipal portfolios for culture, economic development, and the city center. He was also named the Acting Chairman of the Eden Company which oversees development of the city center.

Berkovitch worked together with Member of Knesset Roy Folkman to pass a law which charged the owners of vacant properties double property tax. The purpose of this law was to increase the number of apartments available for rent in the city. Berkovitch also led additional efforts in the area of housing during his term as Deputy Mayor. One such effort focused on abandoned properties and led to the destruction of the Dan Pearl hotel which had been abandoned for approximately 15 years prior. Another such effort included his work to implement a regulation passed by then-Minister of the Interior Gideon Sa'ar which allowed local authorities to utilize public lands for the purpose of building apartments which would be rented out at low prices.

Berkovitch also fought to avoid the closure of Jerusalem's Smadar Cinema in the German Colony, the city's oldest active cinema. As part of his efforts to save the cinema, Berkovitch mediated a meeting between the cinema owners and the building's landlord which led to an agreement that allowed for the cinema to continue operating for an additional 10 years. Similarly, he led another initiative which widened the criteria under which properties being used by artists were eligible for discounts in property tax. Under the new criteria, properties eligible for discounts were widened to include those being used for previously unincluded disciplines such as jewelry-making, photography, video art, music, and literature.

Berkovitch has long worked to return government offices to Jerusalem. In response to Berkovitch's requests, Deputy Minister for Regional Cooperation Ayoob Kara announced that he would move his office to Jerusalem. Similarly, Berkovitch fought against an attempt to move the offices of the Israeli Broadcasting Corporation out of Jerusalem.

In summer 2017, a crisis arose between Jerusalem Mayor Nir Barkat and Berkovitch and his Hitorerut party after Berkovitch and Hitorerut criticized Barkat over his plan to divide Jerusalem's neighborhoods into those meant for the secular, those meant for the religious, and those meant for the city's ultra-orthodox population. In response, Barkat began cancelling work meetings set by Berkovitch and even threatened Hitorerut's city council members with a defamation lawsuit for their claims that he instructed the city's legal advisor to issue an opinion against Hitorerut city council member Einav Bar-Cohen.

=== City council member (2017–2018) ===
In November 2017, Berkovitch announced that Hitorerut was leaving Barkat's council coalition and resigning as Deputy Mayor. At the same time, Berkovitch announced that he would run in the 2018 Jerusalem mayoral election. In the elections held on October 30, 2018, Berkovitch placed second in a four-way race, receiving 29% of the vote, and advanced to a second round of voting against first-place finisher Moshe Lion (33%) after no candidate received the 40% of votes necessary to win. In the November 13 runoff, Berkovitch lost to Lion in a close race, receiving 49.15% of the vote to Lion's 50.85%.
