= Ze'ev Elkin =

Israeli politician (born 1971)

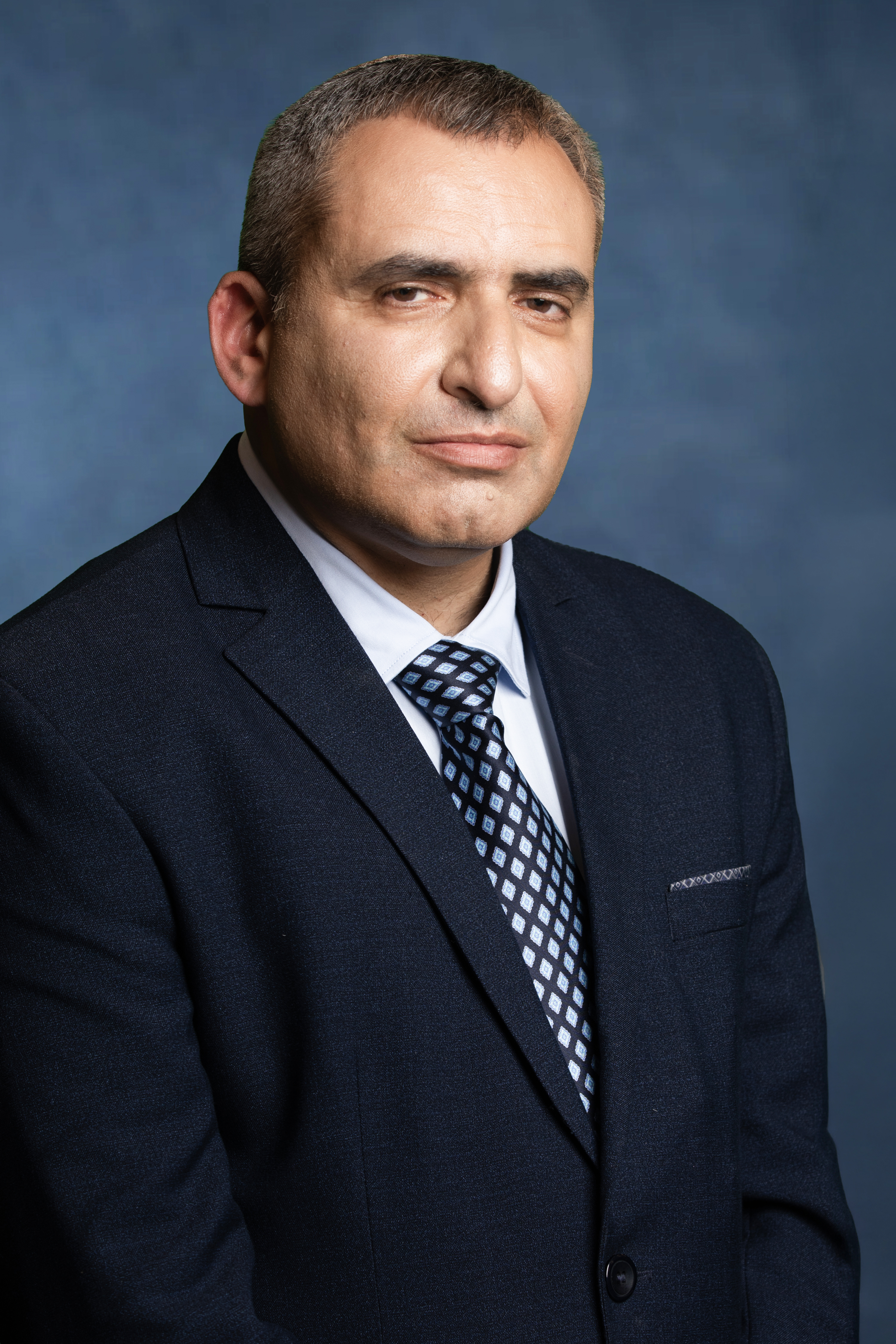
- Elkin in 2020

Ministerial roles
- 2015–2016: Minister of Immigrant Absorption
- 2015–2019: Minister of Jerusalem Affairs
- 2016–2020: Minister of Environmental Protection
- 2020: Minister of Higher Education
- 2020: Minister of Water Resources
- 2021–2022: Minister of Jerusalem Affairs
- 2021–2022: Minister of Housing & Construction

Faction represented in the Knesset
- 2006–2009: Kadima
- 2009–2020: Likud
- 2021: New Hope
- 2022–: National Unity
- 2024–2026: New Hope

Personal details
- Born: 3 April 1971 (age 55) Kharkov, Soviet Union

Ze'ev Elkin (Note: Hebrew: זְאֵב אֵלְקִין; Ze'ev Elkin Russian: Зеэв Элькин; Zeev El'kin) (born 3 April 1971) is an Israeli politician who served as a Member of the Knesset for the New Hope Party. He was previously a member of the Knesset for Kadima, Likud, and the National Unity Party, and served as Minister of Jerusalem Affairs, Minister of Housing and Construction, Minister of Immigrant Absorption, Minister of Environmental Protection, Minister of Higher Education, and Minister of Water Resources.

== Biography ==
Born Vladimir Borisovich Elkin to a secular Russian-speaking Jewish family in Kharkiv in the Ukrainian Soviet Socialist Republic of the Soviet Union (now part of an independent Ukraine), Elkin became interested in Judaism, joined the Bnei Akiva movement, and learned Hebrew on his own. He studied mathematics and physics at Kharkiv University from 1987 to 1990, earning a BA in mathematics. He founded the Association of Hebrew and Jewish Teachers during his time at university. In 1990, he became the general secretary of the Soviet Union branch of Bnei Akiva. In December that year he immigrated to Israel along with his wife.

He studied at the Hebrew University of Jerusalem, gaining a BA in history in 1994 and an MA in history in the same year. Later, Elkin was involved in academic Jewish and medieval studies; in particular, he studied the works of Saadia Gaon. He was also involved in Jewish education in the countries of the former Soviet Union. He also studied at Yeshivat Har Etzion in 1995.

== Political career ==
Elkin was elected to the 17th Knesset in 2006 as a member of Kadima and chaired the subcommittee on the absorption of immigrant children and youth. In November 2008 he decided to quit Kadima, as he considered it to have become a left-wing party. He subsequently joined Likud, and won twentieth place on its list for the 2009 elections. He retained his seat as Likud won 27 mandates.

In November 2012, he released an election video for his Likud primaries campaign that went viral, earning 250,000 views in only a matter of days. He was subsequently re-elected again in 2013. He served as Deputy Minister of Foreign Affairs between March 2013 and June 2014, and then became Chairman of the Knesset's Foreign Affairs and Defense Committee.

Elkin was placed eighth on the Likud list for the 2015 elections, and was re-elected when Likud won 30 seats. After the elections, he was appointed Minister of Immigrant Absorption and Minister of Strategic Affairs in the new government. Elkin surrendered the Strategic Affairs post after only 11 days, when Prime Minister Netanyahu appointed Gilad Erdan Minister of Public Security, Strategic Affairs, and Public Diplomacy on 24 May 2015. Elkin demanded the Minister of Jerusalem Affairs portfolio as compensation for losing Strategic Affairs. Netanyahu met his demand, breaking an election promise to the Mayor of Jerusalem, Nir Barkat, who had wanted Netanyahu to retain the portfolio himself.

On 30 May 2016, Elkin lost the portfolio of Minister of Immigrant Absorption to Sofa Landver of Yisrael Beiteinu. However, on 1 August 2016, he was appointed Minister of Environmental Protection, succeeding Avi Gabbay. He ran for the Jerusalem mayoralty in the 2018 local elections on the "Jerusalem Will Succeed" list. Despite being endorsed by Prime Minister Benjamin Netanyahu, he was eliminated in the first round.

He was re-elected to the Knesset in April 2019, September 2019 and March 2020. In May 2020 he was appointed to the newly created posts of Minister of Higher Education and Minister of Water Resources in the new government.

Elkin resigned from the government as Minister of Water Resources and Higher Education, left Likud and joined Gideon Sa'ar's party, New Hope, on 23 December 2020. He was placed third on the list for the March 2021 elections and regained his seat in the Knesset as New Hope won six seats. He was subsequently appointed Minister of Jerusalem Affairs and Minister of Housing & Construction in the new government. After joining the government, he resigned from the Knesset under the Norwegian Law and was replaced by Meir Yitzhak Halevi.

Because of Elkin's fluency in Russian, for more than a decade he has served as an interpreter for both Prime Ministers Benjamin Netanyahu and Naftali Bennett whenever they have met with Russian president Vladimir Putin.

Elkin was granted an exemption from Likud's senior membership requirements on 11 August 2026 by Benjamin Netanyahu and will be allowed to run in the upcoming Likud primary.

== Personal life ==
Elkin is married, and has five children.
