= 2008 Israeli municipal elections =

Municipal elections were held in Israel on 11 November 2008.

== Results ==
Municipality	Mayoral election				Council election			
Municipality	Candidate	Party	Votes	%	Party	Votes	%	Seats
Abu Ghosh	Salim Gabar	Development and Equality	1,815	52.34	Development and Equality	1,669	48.01	4
Abu Ghosh					United Abu Ghosh List	994	28.60	3
Abu Ghosh					Social Justice	428	12.31	1
Abu Ghosh					al-Farj	300	8.63	1
Abu Snan	Nohad Mashleb	Advanced List	3,136	50.14	Hadash	1,381	21.63	3
Abu Snan					United Druze List	1,213	18.99	2
Abu Snan					al-Resala	875	13.70	2
Abu Snan					al-Naza'a	701	10.98	1
Abu Snan					al-Mandar	658	10.30	1
Abu Snan					United Arab List	586	9.18	1
Abu Snan					Brotherhood and Equality	556	8.71	1
Alfei Menashe	Hasdai Eliezer	LeYishuv	2,295	77.30	LeYishuv	1,947	64.84	6
Alfei Menashe					Alfei Menashe 2000	645	21.48	2
Alfei Menashe					Alternativa	411	13.69	1
Ariel	Ron Nachman	Lev	3,638	51.43	Lev	2,355	32.72	4
Ariel					Arieli	1,817	25.25	4
Ariel					Ariel Beiteinu	1,134	15.76	2
Ariel					Ofek Hadash	673	9.35	1
Ashdod	Yehiel Lasri	Ashdod BeTenofa	49,758	55.93	Ashdod Beiteinu	15,044	16.88	5
Ashdod					Shas	12,534	14.06	4
Ashdod					Ashdod BeTenofa	9,735	10.92	4
Ashdod					United Torah Judaism	8,816	9.89	3
Ashdod					Ashdod Mentzahat	8,686	9.75	3
Ashdod					Kahilat Ashdod	6,417	7.20	2
Ashdod					Likud	5,319	5.97	2
Ashdod					Latet - HaTenoa'a Lema'an Hatoshev	4,834	5.42	1
Ashdod					Derekh Hadasha	4,049	4.54	1
Ashdod					Yahdiv	2,789	3.13	1
Ashdod					Gil	2,540	2.85	1
Ashkelon	Benny Vaknin	Ashkelon BeTenofa	14,577	35.09	Ashkelon BeTenofa	3,556	8.37	2
Ashkelon					Reshimat HaTza'irim - HaTafnit LeAshkelon	3,536	8.33	2
Ashkelon					Ahdut Yisrael	3,383	7.97	2
Ashkelon					NRP-Shas	3,251	7.65	2
Ashkelon					Ashkelon Beiteinu	3,225	7.59	2
Ashkelon					Social Justice	3,089	7.27	2
Ashkelon					Agudat Yisrael	2,560	6.03	2
Ashkelon					Likud	2,439	5.74	2
Ashkelon					Atid Hadash LeAshkelon	2,334	5.50	1
Ashkelon					Ashkelon HaMithadeshet	2,170	5.11	1
Ashkelon					Ashkelon Hadasha	2,095	4.93	1
Ashkelon					Taklit HaYarokim	1,955	4.60	1
Ashkelon					Tekoa LeAshkelon	1,719	4.05	1
Azor	Aryeh Pikter	One Azor	2,527	47.89	One Azor	1,925	36.39	5
Azor					The Greens–Our Azor	1,109	20.96	3
Azor					Likud	1,080	20.42	2
Azor					National Religious Party	433	8.19	1
Bat Yam	Shlomo Lahiani	Bat Yam BeRosh Moram	38,950	86.4	Bat Yam BeRosh Moram	17,645	37.81	10
Bat Yam					HaReshima HaMeuhedet	7,284	15.61	4
Bat Yam					Yisrael Beiteinu	5,865	12.57	3
Bat Yam					Shai	3,102	6.65	2
Bat Yam					Likud	3,045	6.53	2
Bat Yam					Bat Yam Ahat	2,970	6.36	1
Bat Yam					Tal LeBat Yam	2,192	4.70	1
Bat Yam					The Greens	2,047	4.39	1
Bat Yam					Kadima	1,458	3.12	1
Beersheba	Ruvik Danilovich	Derekh Hadasha	38,038	60.59	Derekh Hadasha	16,836	26.15	8
Beersheba					Shas	6,225	9.67	3
Beersheba					Reshmiat Datit Meuhedet	5,997	9.32	3
Beersheba					Yisrael Beiteinu	5,172	8.03	3
Beersheba					Be'er Sheva 1	4,905	7.62	2
Beersheba					HaForum HaKahilti	4,375	6.80	2
Beersheba					Rimon	3,239	5.03	2
Beersheba					Likud	2,748	4.27	1
Beersheba					Be'er Sheva Sheli	2,529	3.93	1
Beersheba					Or Reshimat al Miflagatit	2,411	3.75	1
Beersheba					Nativ HaDarom	2,196	3.41	1
Be'er Ya'akov	Nissim Gozlan	Be'er Ya'akov BeTenofa	3,022	77.07	Be'er Ya'akov BeTenofa	2,435	61.72	6
Be'er Ya'akov					Social Justice	802	20.33	2
Be'er Ya'akov					Labor Party	395	10.01	1
Beit Aryeh	Avi Naim	Beit Aryeh Ofarim	890	47.14	Beit Aryeh Ofarim	807	43.04	4
Beit Aryeh					Magshimim et HaHalom	410	21.87	2
Beit Aryeh					Atid	371	19.79	2
Beit Aryeh					Shalom Beit	167	8.91	1
Beit She'an	Jackie Levy	Likud	4,171	46.76	Likud	2,594	28.92	4
Beit She'an					Hanokh LeNoar	2,135	23.80	3
Beit She'an					Tnuat Beit She'an Hadasha	1,134	12.64	2
Beit She'an					Shas	985	10.98	1
Beit She'an					Beyahad	769	8.57	1
Beit She'an					National Religious Party	700	7.80	1
Beit She'an					Kadima	653	7.28	1
Beit Shemesh	Moshe Abutbul	Shas	12,107	45.74	United Torah Judaism	6,015	22.81	5
Beit Shemesh					Shas	4,236	16.06	3
Beit Shemesh					Beyahad	3,733	14.15	3
Beit Shemesh					Likud-Kadima-National Union	3,163	11.99	2
Beit Shemesh					Mishpaha Ahat	2,722	10.32	2
Beit Shemesh					Dor Aher	2,361	8.95	2
Beit Shemesh					Labor Party	1,867	7.08	1
Beit Shemesh					Tov LeBeit Shemesh	1,289	4.89	1
Bir al-Maksur	Yasser Hujirat	al-Ashlah wa al-Tajir	1,729	46.05	Shalvah VePituah	747	20.03	2
Bir al-Maksur					al-Ashlah wa al-Tajir	584	15.66	2
Bir al-Maksur					HaAvoda VeHaShivyon	571	15.31	2
Bir al-Maksur					al-Nur	456	12.23	1
Bir al-Maksur					Athalaf Walathad	401	10.75	1
Bir al-Maksur					al-Wahda Lalta'ir	335	8.98	1
Bnei Brak	Ya'akov Asher	United Torah Judaism	–	–	United Torah Judaism	–	–	25
Bu'eine Nujeidat	Saleh Suleiman	Development	3,002	95.67	Peace and Equality	541	3.37	2
Bu'eine Nujeidat					Al Tekoa	490	12.38	2
Bu'eine Nujeidat					al-Astkama	485	12.25	1
Bu'eine Nujeidat					Al Ta'awon	441	11.14	1
Bu'eine Nujeidat					al-Mostakabel	413	10.43	1
Bu'eine Nujeidat					United	349	8.82	1
Bu'eine Nujeidat					al-Tadaman	342	8.64	1
Eilat	Meir Yitzhak Halevi	Kivun Hadash	10,220	49.72	Kivun Hadash	4,512	21.63	4
Eilat					Tenofa	3,628	17.39	3
Eilat					Bitahon Kalkali LeEitalim	2,669	12.79	3
Eilat					Yahad Hilonim Datayim	1,932	9.26	2
Eilat					Yam	1,781	8.54	2
Eilat					Eilat Beiteinu	1,733	8.31	2
Eilat					Or LeEilat	1,535	7.36	1
Efrat	Oded Revivo	Efrat Mithadeshet	1,861	55.37	Efrat Mithadeshet	1,548	45.61	4
Efrat					Yesh Rut LeEfrat	970	28.58	2
Efrat					Atid	575	16.94	2
Efrat					Bomin Atid LeEfrat	301	8.87	1
El'ad	Yitzhak Shalom Idan	Idan Hadash LeEl'ad	7,789	75.67	Our El'ad	7,911	75.70	12
El'ad					HaSia'a HaDatit Leumit BeEl'ad	1,505	14.40	2
El'ad					Yishai Yahad Shabti Yisrael	676	6.47	1
Elkana	Tzadok Zahorai	Elkana Mithadeshet	822	48.13	Elkana Mithadeshet	753	43.78	4
Elkana					Hazon Elkana	503	29.24	3
Elkana					Elkana Kadima	464	26.98	2
Elyakhin	Moshe Mordechai Hi	Atidnu BeYadinu	1,121	65.52	Atidnu BeYadinu	511	28.05	3
Elyakhin					Elyakhin Atzma'it	374	20.53	2
Elyakhin					National Religious Party	303	16.63	2
Elyakhin					Shas	248	13.61	1
Elyakhin					Likud	198	10.87	1
Even Yehuda	Amos Azani	BeDerekh Aheret	1,803	37.73	BeDerekh Aheret	1.297	27.16	3
Even Yehuda					Ken	1,068	22.37	3
Even Yehuda					Likud and Independents	1,051	22.01	2
Even Yehuda					Ofek Hadash	962	20.15	2
Even Yehuda					Hazit Datit Masoratit LeTova Even Yehuda	397	8.31	1
Givatayim	Reuven Ben-Shahar	Labor Party-Kadima	13,577	78.59	Labor Party-Kadima	7,459	41.24	7
Givatayim					Givatayim Shelanu	2.656	14.68	2
Givatayim					Meretz	1,828	10.11	2
Givatayim					The Greens	1,585	8.76	2
Givatayim					HaGimlaim BeGiv'atayim	1,407	7.77	1
Givatayim					Likud	1,236	6.83	1
Herzliya	Yael German	Herzliya Shelanu	62.26	19,592	Herzliya Shelanu	10,351	31.61	7
Herzliya					Shas-United Torah Judaism	2,689	8.21	2
Herzliya					National Religious Party	2,404	7.34	2
Herzliya					Ma'ariv Herzliya	2,311	7.06	2
Herzliya					Atid	2,193	6.70	1
Herzliya					Labor Party	1,860	5.68	1
Herzliya					The Greens	1,850	5.65	1
Herzliya					Herzliya Ahat	1,592	4.86	1
Herzliya					Tzairim Neto	1,552	4.74	1
Herzliya					Likud	1,317	4.02	1
Iksal	Abd al-Salaam Drousha	al-Sadaka	2,743	45.80	List for Change	1,295	21.60	3
Iksal					United Iksal	1,065	17.78	2
Iksal					Independent Iksal	751	12.53	2
Iksal					al-Wafa	713	11.90	1
Iksal					Arab Democratic Party	501	8.36	1
Iksal					Iksal Democratic Front	427	7.12	1
Iksal					al-Ahlas	420	7.01	1
Jerusalem	Nir Barkat	Yerushaliyim Tatzliah	116,947	53.04	United Torah Judaism	54,206	24.15	8
Jerusalem	Meir Porush	United Torah Judaism	94,456	42.84	Yerushaliyim Tatzliah	40,641	18.17	6
Jerusalem	Arkadi Gaydamak	Social Justice	7,988	3.55	Shas	30,181	13.49	4
Jerusalem	Dan Biron	Ale Yarok	1,119	0.57	Meretz	18,280	8.17	3
Jerusalem					NRP-National Union	22,104	9.88	3
Jerusalem					Hitaorerut Yerushalimim	16,892	7.46	2
Jerusalem					Yerushaliyim Beiteinu	9,603	4.29	2
Jerusalem					Likud	8,688	3.88	1
Jerusalem					Pisgat Ze'ev al HaMapa	7,976	3.57	1
Jerusalem					Lema'an Yerushaliyim	7,968	3.56	1
Jerusalem					Social Justice	5,147	2.30	0
Jerusalem					Ale Yarok	1,436	0.64	0
Jerusalem					Or-The Greens (Israel)	977	0.44	0
Nazareth	Ramiz Jaraisy	Nazareth Democratic Front	18,567	53.87	Nazareth Democratic Front	18,198	52.29	10
Nazareth					United Nazareth List	13,673	39.29	7
Nazareth					Tajma al-Saleh wa al-Tajir	2,930	8.42	2
Or Akiva	Simha Yosifov	Likud-NRP	3,701	42.67	Likud-NRP	1,469	16.79	3
Or Akiva					New Force	1,168	13.35	2
Or Akiva					Leshem Shamim	717	8.20	2
Or Akiva					Or Hatikva	842	9.62	2
Or Akiva					Atid	603	6.89	1
Or Akiva					Gil	836	9.56	1
Or Akiva					Yisrael Beiteinu	723	8.26	1
Or Akiva					Shas	646	7.38	1
Or Yehuda	David Yosef	BeRoshot David Yosef	10,303	71.51	BeRoshot David Yosef	4,573	31.07	5
Or Yehuda					Social Values Education	2,333	15.85	3
Or Yehuda					Neve Savyon List	1,458	9.90	2
Or Yehuda					Or Yehuda Beiteinu	1,255	8.53	1
Or Yehuda					Yahad BeDerekhei Noam	1,206	8.19	1
Or Yehuda					Tnuat Or Hadash	1,056	7.17	1
Or Yehuda					List of Public Trustees in Or Yehuda	901	6.12	1
Or Yehuda					I'm from Or Yehuda	776	5.27	
Oranit	Shlomo Langer	Together with Shlomi	2,116	74.96	Together with Shlomi	2,030	72.11	6
Oranit					Yossi Matzov	520	18.47	2
Oranit					Our Oranit	265	9.41	1
Petah Tikva	Yitzhak Ohayon	Petah Tikva Ahat	41,090	55.52	Petah Tikva Ahat	10,474	13.81	4
Petah Tikva					Sia LePetah Tikva	10,124	13.35	4
Petah Tikva					National Religious Party	7,776	10.25	3
Petah Tikva					Shas	7,079	9.33	3
Petah Tikva					Petah Tikva Beiteinu	6,477	8.54	2
Petah Tikva					Akhpat	4,768	6.29	2
Petah Tikva					Yishai	4,550	6.00	2
Petah Tikva					Likud	3,322	4.38	1
Petah Tikva					United Torah Judaism	3,314	4.37	1
Petah Tikva					Meretz	3,192	4.21	1
Petah Tikva					Haver	2,880	3.80	1
Petah Tikva					Gil Tzair	2,750	3.63	1
Petah Tikva					The Greens	2,702	3.56	1
Petah Tikva					Ma'aminim BePetah Tikva	2,455	3.24	1
Rehovot	Shuki Forer	Rehovot Mithadeshet	13,939	34.68	Likud	6,040	14.65	4
Rehovot					Shas-United Torah Judaism	4,504	10.93	3
Rehovot					Rehovot Mithadeshet	3,825	9.28	2
Rehovot					Mifna LeRehovot	3,548	8.61	2
Rehovot					Rehovot Ahat	3,456	8.39	2
Rehovot					HaReshima HaDatit HaMeuhedet	3,201	7.77	2
Rehovot					Labor Party	3,157	7.66	2
Rehovot					Tzairim Lema'an Rehovot	2,447	5.94	1
Rehovot					Kadima Rehovot	2,384	5.79	1
Rehovot					Rehovot Beiteinu	2,033	4.93	1
Rehovot					Sherut LeToshev	1,704	4.14	1
Rishon LeZion	Dov Tzur	Rak Rishon	42,233	52.07	Kadima-NRP	12,029	14.39	4
Rishon LeZion					Pez	11,070	13.24	4
Rishon LeZion					Rak Rishon	11,051	13.22	4
Rishon LeZion					The Greens	8,023	9.59	3
Rishon LeZion					Rishonim Beiteinu	5,779	6.91	2
Rishon LeZion					Zakh	4,886	5.84	2
Rishon LeZion					Likud	4,769	5.70	2
Rishon LeZion					Shas	4,363	5.22	2
Rishon LeZion					Shel	3,736	4.47	1
Rishon LeZion					Rishon HaMithadeshet	2,900	3.47	1
Rishon LeZion					Hi	2,754	3.29	1
Rishon LeZion					Rishonim BeYahadut Hazit Datit Meuhedet	2,440	2.92	1
Tel Aviv	Ron Huldai	Tel Aviv 1	67,704	50.77	Ir LeKolanu	21,199	15.22	5
Tel Aviv					Tel Aviv 1	20,166	14.48	5
Tel Aviv					The Greens	13,350	9.58	3
Tel Aviv					Power to Pensioners	12,911	9.27	3
Tel Aviv					Meretz	10,894	7.82	3
Tel Aviv					Rov HaIr	10,564	7.58	3
Tel Aviv					NRP-UTJ	9,811	7.04	2
Tel Aviv					Likud	8,838	6.34	2
Tel Aviv					Shas	8,377	6.01	2
Tel Aviv					Hi	6,301	4.52	1
Tel Aviv					Social Justice	5,031	3.61	1
Tel Aviv					Yafa List	3,717	2.67	1
Umm al-Fahm	Khaled Aghbariyya	Kamet al-Aymen	12,418	62.01	al-Kotla al-Islamiya	11,000	53.94	8
Umm al-Fahm	Taha Jibarin			26.54	Kamet al-Adala wa al-Ankad	2,985	14.64	2
Umm al-Fahm	Yusuf Mahajana			6.54	Kamet al-Wafq al-Baldi	2,059	10.10	2
Umm al-Fahm	Raja Agbaria			4.91	Balad	1,396	6.85	1
Umm al-Fahm					Hadash	1,375	6.74	1
Umm al-Fahm					Umm al-Fahm al-Muahda List	1,340	6.57	1

Municipality	Mayoral candidate (party)	%
Beit Jann	Bian Kablan	49.13
Beit Dagan	Eliyahu Dadon (Likud)	58.06
Bnei Aish	Marek Basin (Bnei Aish Beiteinu)	26.02
Binyamina-Giv'at Ada	Uri Distnik	57.88
Basmat Tab'un	Mohammed Zubidat	36.96
Giv'at Ze'ev	Yosef Avrahami	36.59
Giv'at Shmuel	Yossi Brodny	52.06
Jadeidi-Makr	Mohammed Shaami	41.25
Gedera	Yoel Gamliel	53.46
Julis	Suleiman Hana	20.97
Jaljuliya	Gabar Gabar	54.73
Gan Yavne	Aharon Dror	65.57
Jisr az-Zarqa	Az al-Din Amash (Meretz)	48.86
Jish	Elias Elias	48.84
Deir Hana	Raja Khatib	51.29
Dimona	Meir Cohen (Dimona Beiteinu)	61.18
Har Adar	Aviram Cohen	61.03
Zikhron Ya'akov	Eli Abutbul	74.33
Zarzir	Hassan Hayib	50.77
Hadera	Haim Avital (Likud)	65.37
Holon	Moti Sasson	74.24
Hura	Mohammed al-Lanbari	63.58
Hurfeish	Saleh Faris	50.87
Haifa	Yona Yahav	47.09
Hatzor HaGlilit	Shimon Swisa	50.34
Tiberias	Zohar Oved	46.40
Tira	Mamon Abd al-Hi	53.15
Tirat Carmel	Aryeh Tal	41.62
Tamra	Adel Abu al-Hija (Hadash)	22.11
Yanuh-Jat	Wahib Sif (Kadima)	50.63
Yavniel	Roni Cohen	57.71
Yavne	Zvi Guv Ari	34.33
Yehud-Monosson	Yosef Ben-David	51.99
Yafa an-Naseriyye	Imran Kananeh	33.17
Yokneam Illit	Simon Alpasi	63.25
Kabul	Hassan Bukayi	16.38
Kaukab Abu al-Hija	Noaf Hajuj	52.30
Kokhav Ya'ir	Ya'akov Maman	40.32
Kuseife	Salem Abu Rabia	54.32
Ka'abiyye-Tabbash-Hajajre	Zidan Ka'abiyye	56.15
Kafr Bara	Mohammed Asi	26.94
Kfar Vradim	Sion Yehieli	43.60
Kafr Yasif	Oni Toma	51.31
Kfar Yona	Efraim Drai	41.07
Kfar Kama	Nissim Bakir Hassan	15.73
Kfar Saba	Yehuda Ben-Hamo	83.65
Kafr Qasim	Nader Sarsur	39.79
Kafr Qara	Nazia Masarua	18.13
Kfar Shmaryahu	Dror Aloni	–
Kfar Tavor	Yosef Dola	69.12
Karmiel	Adi Eldar	57.91
Lehavim	Eliyahu Levi	54.84
Lakiya	Khaled al-Sana	31.55
Mevaseret Zion	Aryeh Simam	42.27
Maghar	Farid Ganam	30.08
Migdal HaEmek	Eliyahu Barda (Likud)	64.16
Modi'in Illit	Ya'akov Asher Guterman (Degel HaTorah)	–
Modi'in-Maccabim-Re'ut	Haim Bibas	41.69
Mazkeret Batya	Meir Dahan	54.57
Mazra'a	Kasem Awad	47.24
Metula	Herzl Bokar	25.29
Meitar	Avner Ben-Gira	48.58
Mi'ilya	Ilia Araf	41.97
Ma'ale Adumim	Bnei Binyamin Kashriel	72.60
Ma'alot-Tarshiha	Shlomo Bohbot	62.54
Mitzpe Ramon	Flora Shoshan	50.71
Mashhad	Wajia Suleiman	23.6
Nahariya	Jacky Segev	55.01
Nes Ziona	Yosef Shabo	89.67
Nazareth Illit	Shimon Gapso	52.96
Nesher	David Omer (Kadima-Likud)	54.21
Netivot	Yehiel Zohar (Likud)	52.73
Netanya	Miriam Feirberg	81.10
Sajur	Jabar Hamud	25.51
Savyon	Mushik Lipitz	75.38
Sakhnin	Mazen Ghnaim	75.38
Ghajar	Ahmed Fatali	–
Eilabun	Jiris Matar	51.81
Ilut	Hassan Ali	59.44
Ein Mahil	Ahmed Habiballah	45.3
Acre	Shimon Lankri	64.43
Immanuel	Ezra Gershi	57.07
Afula	Avi Elkabetz	56.17
Fureidis	Yonas Marai	48.99
Fassuta	Wadia Asi	53.45
Peki'in	Nasrallah Khir	50.48
Pardes Hanna-Karkur	Haim-David Ga'ash	61.65
Pardesiya	Yitzhak Yemini	44.71
Safed	Ilan Shochat	30.81
Kadima-Tzoran	Yitzhak Golbari	36.54
Qalansawe	Mahmud Hadiga	29.04
Katzrin	Sami Bar Lev	73.21
Kiryat Ono	Yossi Nasri	28.89
Kiryat Arba	Yitzhak Malakhi Levinger	49.76
Kiryat Ata	Ya'akov Peretz (Likud)	55.47
Kiryat Bialik	Eli Dokorski	43.00
Kiryat Gat	Aviram Dahari	51.69
Kiryat Tivon	David Arieli	44.26
Kiryat Yam	Shmuel Siso	84.24
Kiryat Motzkin	Haim Tzur	81.87
Kiryat Malakhi	Motti Malka	82.72
Kiryat Ekron	Arik Hadad	50.67
Kiryat Shmona	Nissim Malka	27.03
Karnei Shomron	Herzl Ben-Ari	41.83
Rameh	Afif Gazawi	62.41
Rosh HaAyin	Moshe Sinai	55.90
Rosh Pina	Avihud Raski	85.25
Rahat	Fayez Abu Sahiban	36.48
Reineh	Adnan Basul	60.90
Rekhasim	Dan Cohen	79.80
Ramla	Yoel Lavi	60.33
Ramat Gan	Zvi Bar	56.15
Ramat HaSharon	Yitzhak Rochberger	85.27
Ramat Yishai	Ofer Ben-Eliezer	36.42
Ra'anana	Nahum Hofree	71.37
Shibli–Umm al-Ghanam	Munir Shibli	29.46
Shaqib al-Salam	Amar Abu Mamar	52.16
Sderot	David Buskila	44.74
Shoham	Gil Livne	57.71
Sha'ab	Mohammed Bukai (Labor Party)	48.19
Shefa-'Amr	Nahad Khazem	34.06
Tel Mond	Shlomo Ratzabi	36.34
Tel as-Sabi	Moussa Abu Issa	50.66
Source: Ministry of Interior, Ministry of Interior

== See also ==
- 2008 Haifa mayoral election
- 2008 Jerusalem mayoral election
- 2008 Tel Aviv mayoral election
