= Freedom Party =

Freedom Party may refer to:

== Active political parties ==
- Freedom Party of Afghanistan
- Freedom Party of Albania
- Freedom Party of Austria
- Bangladesh Freedom Party
- Egyptian Freedom Party
- Freedom Egypt Party
- Freedom Party of Ontario, in Canada
- Freedom Party (Denmark)
- Freedom Party (Finland)
- Svoboda (political party) ("Freedom"), in Ukraine
- Marematlou Freedom Party, in Lesotho
- Party for Freedom, in the Netherlands
- Freedom Party New Zealand
- Inkatha Freedom Party, in South Africa
- Sri Lanka Freedom Party
- Freedom Party of Switzerland
- Freedom Party (Lithuania)
- American Freedom Party, in the U.S.
  - Freedom Party of New York (disambiguation)
- Freedom and Prosperity (Poland)
- Freedom Party of Victoria

== Former political parties ==
- Freedom Party (Bessarabia), in Moldova (1949–1950)
- Freedom Party (Ecuador) (2001–2003, 2007)
- Freedom Party (Indonesia) (2002–2009)
- Freedom Party (Netherlands) (PVV) (1946–1948)
- New Zealand Freedom Party (disambiguation), multiple parties
- Freedom Party (Slovakia) (1946–1990)
- Freedom Party of British Columbia (2001–2009)
- Freedom Party of South Tyrol, in Italy (1988–1993)
- British Freedom Party, in the UK (2010–2012)
- German Freedom Party (2010–2016)
- Hungarian Freedom Party (1946–1947)
- Saint Lucia Freedom Party (2001)
- Sammarineses for Freedom, in San Marino (2002–2012)
- Herut ("Freedom"), in Israel (1948–1988)
- Freedom and People's Rights Movement, in Japan, 1880s
- Freedom and Prosperity Party (Australia) (2009–2015)
- Wolnościowcy ("Freedomites"), in Poland (2022–2024)

== Fictional ==
- Freedom Party, in the Southern Victory novels by Harry Turtledove

== See also ==
- Freedom and Justice Party (disambiguation)
