= Social justice (disambiguation) =

Social justice is a political philosophy that values equality and solidarity

Social justice may also refer to:

- Social Justice Party (disambiguation), various organizations
- Social Justice (newspaper), periodical published in the U.S. In the 1930s and 1940s
- Social Justice (political party), Israeli political party
- Social Justice (journal), academic journal
