= 2003 Israeli municipal elections =

Local elections in several municipalities and councils in Israel

Municipal elections were held in Israel on 28 October 2003.

== By municipality ==
=== Abu Ghosh ===
Candidate Salim Jaber defeated Iosef Ibrahim in the city's Mayoral Election, with Jaber winning 54.11% to Ibrahim's 45.89%. Ibrahim's electoral list won more votes than Jaber's, but the two lists won an equal number of seats (four). a third list won one seat.

Composition of the City Council:

- United Abu Ghosh - Headed by Iosef Ibrahim - 4 Seats
- Development and Equality - Headed by Samil Jaber - 4 seats
- List for Progress and Promotion - 1 seat

=== Even Yehuda ===
Former head of the Israel Prison Service, Amos Azani, defeated rival candidate Karen Katzman, following Avraham Harari's decision to withdraw from the race.

Composition of the City Council:

- Another Way with Amos Azani - 4 Seats
- Karen Katzman for the leadership of the council (Ken) - 2 seats
- Likud led by Avraham Harari - 2 Seats
- Even Yehuda is ours (Mafdal) - 1 Seat

Shinui, Shas and One Even Yehuda did not pass the city council's Electoral threshold.

=== Umm al-Fahm ===
Candidate Hashem Mahajna defeated Sayyid Aghbariyya after Iosef Mahamid and his list withdrew from the race. Mahajna won 75.06% of the vote while Aghbariyya won 24.94% of the vote. neither candidate's electoral list passed the city council's electoral threshold

Composition of the City Council:

- Alkutla Alaslamiyya - 11 Seats
- Althaluf Alwattani Al-Baladi - 4 Seats

Alayiman (Hashem Mahajna's list) and Balad (Sayyid Aghbariyya's list) did not cross the electoral threshold. two lists withdrew from the election, Umm al-Fahm al-Mustakbal and Thalef al-Mustaklin (led by Iosef Mahamid).

=== Ofakim ===
Incumbent Mayor Yair Hazan, who ran under an independent list supported by the Likud, was defeated by the municipal chairman of the Likud, Avi Asraf, Ya'akov Abada also ran for the Mayorship. Hazan won 40.37% of the vote, Asraf won 43.06%, while Abada won 16.58%. in the city council, the largest party was the Community Torah List (Degel HaTorah), while Yair Hazan's party fell to second place, with the likud winning a single seat. Ya'akov Abada's list won no seats.

Composition of the City Council:

- Torah Community - for Ahi (Degel HaTorah) - 2 Seats
- Ofakim Beiteinu - 2 seats
- Shas - 2 seats
- One Ofakim - 1 seat
- Likud led by Avi Asraf - 1 Seat
- Mafdal - 1 seat
- Community - 1 seat
- Yahad - 1 seat

The following lists did not cross the City Council's electoral threshold: Light in Ofek, Revolution, New Ofek and Shiluv (led by Ya'akov Abada).

=== Oranit ===
Several settlements in the West Bank held municipal elections for the first time in 2003, including Oranit.

Zvi Ma-Yafit narrowly defeated Dov Rozen by a margin of 20 votes. Shimon Adri and Roni Shemer also ran. Ma-Yafit won 45.23% of the vote, Rozen won 44.4%, Adri won 6.47% and Shemer won 3.9%.

Composition of the City Council:

- Oranit Ma-Yafit (Zvi Ma-Yafit's list) - 4 Seats
- Dov Rozen list - 4 Seats
- Adri Shimon list - 1 Seat

The Yachad list, led by Roni Shemer, did not pass the City Council's electoral threshold.

=== Ezor ===
Incumbent Mayor Amnon Zach was re-elected as mayor with support from left-winning parties and the city's Haredi electoral list. he was challenged by the municipal leader of the Likud, Uriel Tan'ami, as well as Zion Hava and Navon Katsav. Zach won 48.51% of the vote, Tan'ami won 25.03% of the vote, hava won 14.73% of the vote and Katsav won 11.73% of the vote.

Composition of the City Council:

- Labor - One Nation - Meretz (led by Amon Zach) - 4 Seats
- Likud (led by Uriel Tan'ami) - 3 Seats
- Our Ezor (led by Zion Hava) - 1 Seat
- United Religious Front (Shas-Mafdal) - 1 Seat
- Alternative (led by Navon Katsav) - 1 Seat
- Judaism with a Soul (United Torah Judaism) - 1 Seat

=== Elyakhin ===
Incumbent Mayor Gideon Hamami defeated the municipal leader of the Likud, Zarah Yehuda, following David Hamami's withdrawal from the race. Hamami won 54.52% of the vote while Yehuda won 45.48%

Composition of the City Council:

- Independent Elyakhin (led by Gideon Hamami) -2 Seats
- Mafdal - 2 Seats
- Shas - 1 Seat
- Likud - 1 Seat
- Shinui - 1 Seat

Yachad (led by David Hamami) did not cross the City Council's electoral threshold.

=== Be'er Ya'akov ===
Likud candidate Nissim Gozlan defeated Iosef Omid and Avraham Buskila. Gozlan won 66.67% of the vote, Omid won 32.66%, and Buskila won 0.67%

Composition of the City Council:

- Likud (led by Nissim Gozlan) - 4 Seats
- Haredi Front (Shas - Agudat Yisrael, led by Avraham Buskila) - 2 Seats
- Mafdal - 2 Seats
- There is another way (led by Iosef Omid) - 1 Seat

=== Beersheba ===
Incumbent mayor Yaakov Turner was re-elected, he faced Likud Candidate Andrey Ozen, and Zvi Fogel, in addition to Moshe Borochov, City Councillor Ohev Shalom, Iosef Sechtman, and Yael Magen. YTurner won around 48% of the vote, Ozen won 16.7%, Borochov won 5.11%, Sechtman won 3.51% and Magen won 2.82%.

Ruvik Danilovich, who led Kadima Beersheba in the city council election, later became the city's mayor.

Composition of the City Council:

- Kadima Beersheba (led by Ruvik Danilovich) - 7 Seats
- One Beersheba (supported by Labor and led by Ya'akov Turner)
- Religious Union (Shas-Mafdal-United Torah Judaism) - 4 Seats
- Beersheba Beitenu (Yisrael Beiteinu, led by Moshe Borochov) - 2 Seats
- Likud (led by Andrey Ozen) - 2 Seats
- Beersheva in the lead - Shinui (led by Tsvika Fogel) - 2 Seats
- Beersheba is Ours - 1 Seat
- Path of the South (Zecharia Ohev Shalom) - 1 Seat
- A Step into the Future - 1 Seat

Alternative (led by Iosef Sechtman), Renewal (led by Yael Magen), the Camp of Justice (Meretz), Sachar, the New Hope and Nahal 2003 did not cross the City Council's electoral threshold.

=== Bnei Ayish ===
Incumbent Mayor Mark Bessin was re-elected to a second term. he faced Yitzhak ben-Yitzhak and Boris Gorman. Bessin won 60.92% of the vote, ben-Yitzhak won 24.16% and Gorman won 14.91%

Composition of the City Council:

- Our One Home Bnei Ayish (Yisrael Beitenu, led by Mark Bessin) - 5 Seats
- Likud (led by Yitzhak Ben-Yitzhak) - 2 Seats
- Promotion (also known as Kidum, led by Boris Gorman) - 1 Seat

=== Givatayim ===
Incumbent mayor since 1993, Ephraim (Ephi) Stenzler, was re-elected. he faced Iosef Zarzevski and Talia Argaman. Stenzler won 55.88% of the vote, Zarzevski won 23.64% of the vote, and Argaman won 20.48% of the vote. Stenzler later resigned as mayor in 2006.

Composition of the City Council:

- Labor (led by Ephi Stenzler) - 5 Seats
- Likud (led by Talia Argaman) - 3 Seats
- Believe in Givatayim (Mafdal) - 2 Seats
- It will be good in Givatayim (Iosef Zarzevski) - 2 Seats
- Only Givatayim - 2 Seats
- Shinui - 1 Seat
- Meretz - 1 Seat
- Givatayim's youths - 1 Seat

=== Herzliya ===
Incumbent mayor Yael German was re-elected. she faced Yehuda Urieli, Daniel Falti, Urit Rashafi, Uzi Lev-Zur, Harel Nissinov, and Yossi Givati. German won around 56% of the vote, Urieli won around 23%, Falti won 5.49% of the vote, Rashafi won 5.03%, Lev-Zur won 5.01%, Nissinov won 3.62% and Givati won 1.56%.

Composition of the City Council:

- Our Herzliya led by Yael German (supported by Meretz) - 6 Seats
- Mafdal-United Torah Judaism - 2 Seats
- West Herzliya - 2 Seats
- Herzliya deserves more led by Yehuda Arieli - 2 Seats
- Shas - 2 Seats
- Sunshine and the Greens - 1 Seat
- Renewing Labor (Labor Party) - 1 Seat
- Shinui - 1 Seat
- Likud (led by Uzi Lev-Zur) - 1 Seat
- Atid - 1 Seat

Parent committees in Herzliya (led by Harel Nissinov), Herzliya for its Citizens, Herzliya returns to lead (Daniel Falti), Urit Rashafi for Mayor, and the list of 'Givati has an advantage in Experience' did not cross the City Council's electoral threshold.

=== Holon ===
Incumbent Mayor Moti Sasson was re-elected, defeating Yoel Yeshuron. Sasson won 58.54% while Yeshuron won 41.46%

Composition of the City Council:

- Truth led by Moti Sasson (Labor Party) - 7 Seats
- Shas - 5 Seats
- Likud (led by Yoel Yeshuron) - 4 Seats
- Holon Beitenu (Yisrael Beitenu) - 2 Seats
- Shinui - 2 Seats
- Amos Yerushalmi List - 1 Seat
- Meretz - 1 Seat
- Greens - 1 Seats
- Mafdal - 1 Seats
- Social Camp - 1 Seat (Supported by One Nation)

The Holon List led by Moshe Rom, who served as the city's mayor between 1989 and 1993, did not pass the City Council's Electoral Threshold.

=== Haifa ===
Shinui Candidate Yona Yahav was elected mayor, becoming the city's first mayor not to be born in Haifa and not to run as a member of the Labor Party. he defeated Shmuel Arad Shagraf, Aryeh Blitnetel, and Shimon Ohion. Yahav won 51.8% of the vote, Shagraf won 42% of the vote, Blitnetel won 3% and Ohion won 1.5% of the vote.

Composition of the City Council:

- Our Haifa - (supported by Shinui) - 6 Seats
- Likud-One Nation - 5 Seats
- The Citizen is in First Priority - list of Youths, the Elderly, and Women (Labor Party) - 3 Seats
- Hadash - 2 seats
- Mafdal - 2 seats
- Shas - 2 seats
- Yachad (Originated from Yisrael BaAliyah) - 2 Seats
- Haifa Beitenu (Yisrael Beitenu) - 2 Seats
- Kiryat Haim Only (led by Eliezer Kulas) - 2 Seats
- United Torah Judaism (led by Yehuda Aryeh Blitnetel) - 1 Seat
- Meretz - Haifa in the heart - Dor Shalom - Meimad - 1 Seat
- Green Haifan Group - 1 Seat
- Balad - 1 Seats
- Citizens of the City - 1 Seat

Altalena (led by Shimon Ohion), the Greens, Light for the Neighborhoods and "Push" did not cross the City Council's electoral threshold.

=== Jerusalem ===
Candidate Uri Lupolianski defeated Nir Barkat, and became Jerusalem's mayor. he also defeated Yigal Amadi, Larissa Gerstein and Roni Aloni. Lupolianski received 51% of the vote and around 99,000 votes while Barkat received around 74.500 votes, and 42.7% of the vote.

Composition of the City Council:

- United Torah Judaism - 9 Seats
- Jerusalem Will Succeed - 9 Seats
- Shas - 5 Seats
- Mafdal - 4 Seats
- Meretz - 3 Seats
- Shinui - 2 Seats
- Likud - 2 Seats

The Labor Party and One Nation did not cross the City Council's electoral threshold.

=== Kfar Vradim ===
Ron Moskovich defeated Hanan Hen and Reuven Malach. Moskovich won 54.47% of the vote, Hen won 35.53%, and Malach won 10% of the vote.

Composition of the City Council:

- Ram in motion (led by Ron Moskovich) - 4 Seats
- Tomer - Citizens are Satisfied - 3 Seats
- Yachad (led byHanan Hen) - 2 Seats

More (led by Reuven Malach) did not cross the City Council's electoral threshold.

=== Kfar Yona ===
Incumbent head of the Regional council since 1977 Effi Deri defeated six other candidates. Israela Rozen, Yitzhak Dov, Avishai Bar'am, Rafael Eliya, Haim Mor, and Aaron Halfon. Deri won 42.11% of the vote, Rozen won 21.4%, Dov won 18.42%, Bar'am won 10.88%, Eliya 2.96%, Mor 2.83%, and Halfon 1.39%

Composition of the Regional Council:

- One Kfar Yona led by Effi Deri - 3 Seats
- Led by Avi Ben Simon - 2 Seats
- Local List led by Israela Rosen - 2 Seats
- Shinui (led by Avishai Bar'am) - 1 Seat
- New Way (led by Yitzhak Dov) - 1 Seat
- Shas - 1 Seat
- Movement for the Welfare of Citizens - 1 Seat

Mafdal, New life in Kfar Yona (led by Haim Mor and supported by One Nation), Likud (led by Aaron Halfon) and the National Union (led by Rafael Eliya) did not cross the Regional Council's electoral threshold.

=== Migdal HaEmek ===
Incumbent mayor Eliyahu Barada was re-elected, defeating Golan Mashali, Amos Galam, and Eliezer Sa'ada. Barada won 57.54% of the vote, Mashali won 22.48%, Galam won 16.59% and Sa'ada won 3.39%.

Composition of the City Council

- Migdal HaEmek Beitenu (Yisrael Beitenu) - 3 Seats
- Shas - 3 Seats
- Mafdal - 2 Seats
- Likud (led by Eliyahu Barada) - 2 Seats
- Shinui - for the Generation (led by Golan Mashali) - 2 Seats
- Yachad-One Nation (led by Amos Galam) - 2 Seats
- Oz - 1 Seat

Labor (led by Eliezer Sa'ada) the Hai Movement, and Together Hiloni-Religious did not cross the City Council's electoral threshold.

=== Ma'alot-Tarshiha ===
Incumbent mayor since 1976, Shlomo Bohbot, was re-elected as Mayor. defeating Dan Tseyzler and Lior Lassri. Bohbot won 59.61% of the vote, Tseyzler won 25.35% and Lassri won 15.04%.

Composition of the City Council:

- Our Ma'a lot-Tarshiha led by Shlomo Bohbot - 5 Seats
- Together - 2 Seats
- Ma'a lot Religious Front (Mafdal-Shas) - 2 Seats
- Balad - 2 Seats
- Ma'a lot Beitenu (Yisrael Beitenu) - 2 Seats
- Traction (led by Dan Tseyzler) - 1 Seats

Alternative (led by Lior Lassri), Brotherhood and Cooperation, the Movement for Change and Rehabilitation, Tarshiha Al'Mustakabal, Shinui - Change in Ma'a lot-Tarshiha and Mada did not cross the City Council's electoral threshold.

=== Nahariya ===
Incumbent mayor since 1989, Jackie Sabag, was defeated by Ron Promer. Promer also defeated Eyal Eli. Sabag won 45.74% of the vote, Promer won 53.06% and Eli won 1.21%. in 2005, the Haifa Regional District Court declared the election void and called for another election after it was determined that some of Promer's agreements with other parties were illegal.

Composition of the City Council:

- Only Nahariya led by Ron Promer - 6 Seats
- Nahariya One led by Jackie Sabag - 5 Seats
- Change for Nahariya (Shinui) - 1 Seat
- Likud - 1 Seat
- Or (supported by Degel HaTorah) - 1 Seat
- Our Nahariya - 1 Seat
- Tsalash - 1 Seat
- Shas - 1 Seat

A Hand for Nahariya and Together Nahariya in the heart (led by Eyal Eli) did not cross the City Council's electoral threshold.

=== Nazareth Illit ===
Incumbent Mayor Menachem Ariev was re-elected to a seventh term. he faced Ronen Flot and Nissim Akuka. Candidate Raid Gtas withdrew from the race. Ariev won 48.02% of the vote, Flot won 38.37% and Akuka won 13.61% of the vote.

Composition of the City Council:

- One Nazareth Illit led by Menachem Ariev (supported by Labor) - 5 Seats
- Likud (led by Ronen Flot) - 5 Seats
- National Union-Yisrael Beitenu (led by Lia Shemtov) - 3 Seats
- To My city with Love led by Nissim Akuka - 2 Seats
- Shinui - 1 Seat
- Basad Together - 1 Seat

United Nazareth Illit, the Co-Existence list, Partnership, Shas and the Aladla List did not cross the City Council's electoral threshold.

=== Nesher ===
Incumbent Mayor David Amar was re-elected as mayor, defeating Avraham Binmo. Amar won 70.23% of the vote and Binmo won 29.77%

Composition of the City Council:

- Likud (led by David Amar) - 3 Seats
- Greens for Nesher (led by Avraham Binmo) - 3 Seats
- Nesher Plus - 1 Seat
- Shinui - 1 Seat
- National Religious Front (Mafdal - United Torah Judaism) - 1 Seat
- Nesher Beitenu (Yisrael Beitenu) - 1 Seat
- Shas - 1 Seat
- Aliyah our Hope (supported by One Nation) - 1 Seat
- One Nesher (supported by Labor) - 1 Seat

=== Savyon ===
Incumbent Head of the local council Romamya Halevi-Segal defeated former Councillor Marsha Caspi. future Head of the council Motti Landau was first elected to the council as a member of the Traction list. Halevi-Segal won 82.14% of the vote, whole Caspi won 17.86%.

Composition of the Regional Council:

- Our Savyon (Romamya Halevi-Segal) - 3 Seats
- Future (led by Moshik Lipetz) - 2 Seats
- Traction - 2 Seats
- There is a Union - 1 Seat
- Loyalists of Savyon (led by Marsha Caspi) - 1 Seat

No list failed to cross the council's electoral threshold.

=== Acre ===
After incumbent Mayor Shmariyau Biran decided not to seek re-election, six candidates registered to run for Mayor. three candidates (Israel Ben-Ezra, Ze'ev Neumann and Asher Segra) withdrew before election day. Shimon Lankri defeated Moshe Davidovich by around 100 votes. he also defeated Aaron Lehiani. Lanrki won 47.1% of the vote, Davidovich won 46.56% of the vote, and Lehiani won 6.33%.

Composition of the City Council

- This is the chance for change (led by Shimon Lankri) - 3 Seats
- New Acre led by Ze'ev Neumann - 2 Seats
- Al'Mustakabal - 2 Seats
- Al'Ufak Al-Abai - 2 Seats
- Shas - 2 seats
- Labor (led by Moshe Davidovich) - 2 Seats
- Union of Akkoans - 1 Seat
- Our Hopes - 1 Seat
- Destination (led by Aaron Lehiani) - 1 Seat
- Religious Union - Tkuma for Acre - 1 Seat

Likud, Netz (led by Israel Ben-Ezra) Tzalash - Youths for change, Mafdal and a Future for Acre did not cross the city council's electoral threshold.

=== Pardesiya ===
Incumubent mayor since 1972, Yitzhak Yemini was re-elected as mayor, defeating Moshe Odiz. Yemini won 79.63% of the vote, Odiz won 20.37%. No list failed to cross the City Council's electoral threshold.

Composition of the City Council:

- Local List for One Pardesia (led by Yitzhak Yemini) - 4 Seats
- Future - 2 Seats
- Mafdal - 1 Seat
- Likud (led by Moshe Odiz) - 1 Seat
- Tradition - 1 Seat

=== Petah Tikva ===
Incumbent mayor Yitzhak Ohion was re-elected, defeating Rafi Dahan. Ya'akov Felheimer, and Sarah Oren. Ohion won 60.9% of the vote, Dahan won 17.69%, Felheimer won 15.82% and Oren won 5.59%.

Composition of the City Council

- A Peak for Petah Tikva (Shinui, the Greens, and Labor, led by Uri Ahad) - 5 Seats
- One Petah Tikva led by Yitzhak Ohion - 4 Seats
- Shas led by Sinai Gilboa - 3 Seats
- Mafdal led by Faltiel Izental - 3 Seats
- Likud led by Rafi Dahan - 2 Seats
- Yisrael Beitenu led by Gennady Borshovsky - 2 Seats
- The Tribes of Israel Together led by Benny Zahavi and Rabbi Avraham Sabag - 2 Seats
- United Torah Judaism - Agudat Yisrael - Degel HaTorah led by Shlomo Aryeh Korlanski - 1 Seat
- Free City - Meretz led by Sarah Oren - 1 Seat
- One nation led by Sarah Haftal - 1 Seat
- Citizen in the Center led by Ya'akov Felheimer - 1 Seat

Voice of the Citizens, Independent List, For Petah Tikva, the 12 Volunteers, For a Future and the movement for the Forum of Neighborhoods did not cross the City Council's electoral threshold.

=== Kiryat Malakhi ===
Incumbent Mayor Lior Katsav was defeated by Motti Malka. Malka also defeated Yossi Sulimani, Chaim Weizmann, and Avraham (Beber) Azulai. Malka won 58.39% of the vote, Katsav won 13.29, Sulimani won 11.1%, Weizmann won 10.22% and Azulai won 7% of the vote.

Composition of the City Council:

- Likud - Chabad (led by Motti Malka) - 3 Seats
- Unity of Israel - 2 Seats
- Hope for the City Council - 2 Seats
- Loyalists of the Kirya - 2 Seats
- Shas - 2 Seats
- One Nation (led byAvraham Azulai) - 1 Seat
- Labor (led by Yossi Sulimani) - 1 Seat

Another Kiryat Malakhi (led by Chaim Weizmann), One Kiryat Malakhi-Mafdal (led by Lior Katsav), Shield of Kirya and the Revolution did not cross the City Council's Electoral Threshold.

=== Kiryat Ekron ===
Incumbent leader of the Local Council Arik Hadad was defeated by Shuli Suleiman. Suleiman won 54.52% of the vote and Hadad won 45.48%.

Composition of the Local Council:

- One Ekron led by Arik Hadad (supported by Labor) - 3 Seats
- Likud (led by Shuli Suleiman) - 2 Seats
- A Future for Kiryat Ekron - 2 Seats
- Shas - 1 Seat
- Mafdal -1 Seat

All Competing lists crossed the Local Council's electoral threshold.

=== Rosh Pinna ===
Incumbent head of the Local Council since 2000, Avihod Raski, was re-elected, defeating Motti Hattiel and Uzi Blom. Raski won 76.64% of the vote, Hattiel won 17.43% and Blom won 5.93%. Hattiel later became head of the Local Council.

Composition of the Local Council:

- One Rosh Pinna (led by Avihod Raski) - 2 Seats
- Guy Oni (led by Motti hatiel) - 2 Seats
- Women of Rosh Pinna - 2 Seat

Together (led by Uzi Blom) did not cross the Local Council's electoral threshold.

=== Tel Aviv-Yafo ===
Incumbent Mayor Ron Huldai was re-elected after winning around 63% of the vote

Composition of the City Council:

- Power for Retirees - 6 Seats
- Meretz Tel-Aviv Yafo - 5 Seats
- One Tel-Aviv - 4 Seats
- Greens - 4 Seats
- Likud - 3 Seats
- Shas - 3 Seats
- United Torah Judaism and Eli Eminov - 2 Seats
- Shinui - 2 Seats
- Mafdal - 1 Seat
- the Public's right to Know - 1 Seat

After the election was held, all party lists besides Shinui and 'the public's right to know' joined Huldai's governing coalition.
