= Miriam Feirberg =

Israeli politician (1951–2025)

- מרים פיירברג
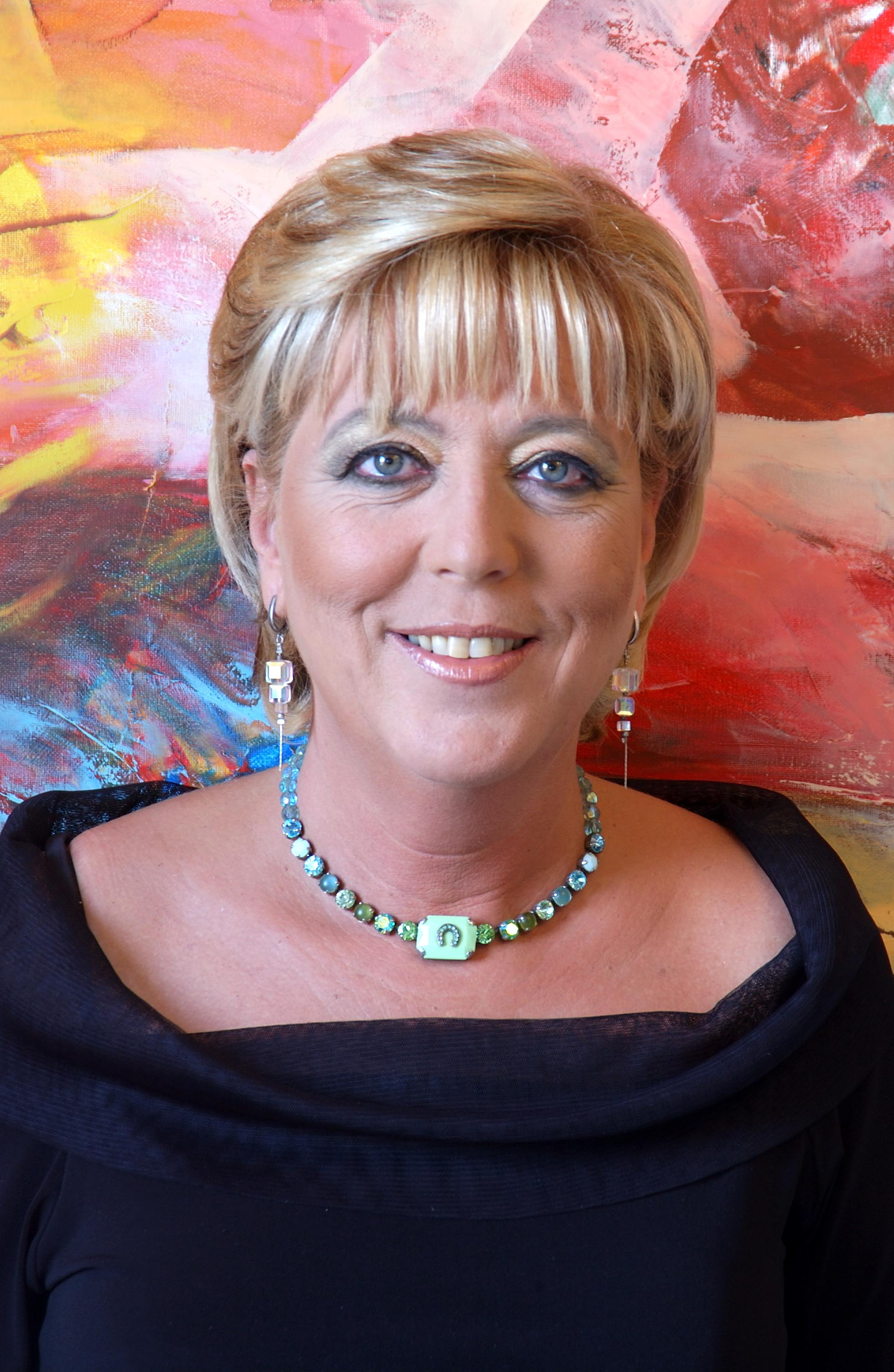
- Feirberg in 2006

13th Mayor of Netanya
- In office 10 November 1998 – 21 November 2025
- Preceded by: Vered Swid
- Succeeded by: Avi Slama

Personal details
- Born: 11 July 1951 Acre, Israel
- Died: 21 November 2025 (aged 74) Netanya, Israel
- Party: Likud
- Spouse(s): Eli Feirberg (div. 2004) Roni Ikar (m. 2004)
- Children: 2
- Education: Bar-Ilan University

Miriam Feirberg-Ikar (Hebrew: מרים פיירברג-איכר; 11 July 1951 – 21 November 2025) was an Israeli politician. At the time of her death, she was serving as the mayor of Netanya, a city in the Central District of Israel. Feirberg was the first elected female mayor in Netanya and is one of the few women who have served as mayors of Israeli cities.

== Background ==
Miriam Feirberg was born in Acre, a city in northern Israel. Her father was an officer in the Israel Border Police, and her mother was a social worker. She obtained her Bachelor of Arts degree in sociology, criminology and social work, and her Master of Arts degree in social work, both from Bar-Ilan University.

Feirberg was married to Eli Feirberg. They have a son, Tzafrir, and a daughter, Tal. In 2004, she married Roni Ikar, former CEO of Netanya municipality. She died on 21 November 2025, at the age of 74.

== Public service career ==
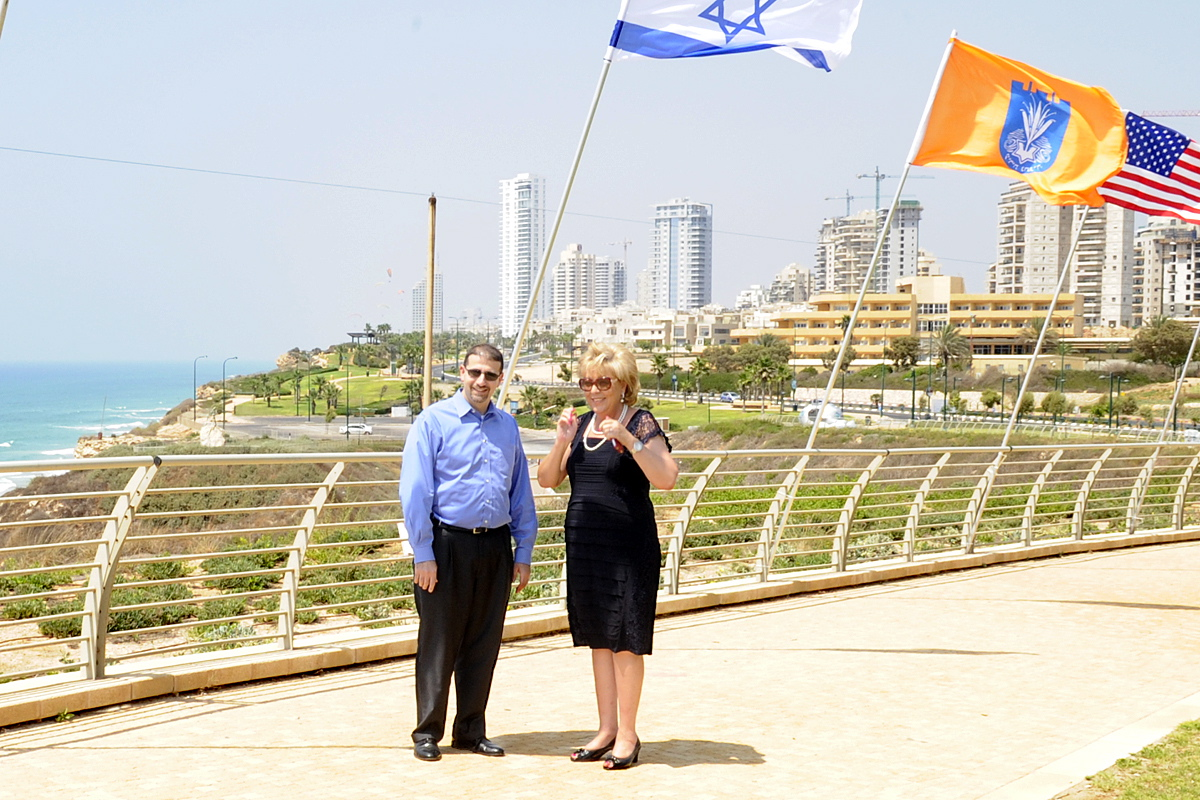
Feirberg with U.S. Ambassador to Israel, Dan Shapiro

From 1972 to 1988, Feirberg was a social worker and head of the Netanya municipal social services department. In 1998, she was elected mayor of Netanya. She was reelected mayor in 2003, 2008, 2013, 2018, and 2024.

== Controversy ==
In September 2016, Feirberg was arrested on suspicion of bribery, fraud, and abuse of power in connection with alleged municipal corruption, by Lahav 433. In June 2019, the investigation against Feirberg was closed, after State Prosecutor Shai Nitzan and other officials found a lack of evidence against her.

== Awards and recognition ==
Feirberg won the 1990 prize for efficient management from the Union of Local Authorities in Israel.
