= Yaakov Turner =

Israeli general and politician (1935–2024)

- יעקב טרנר
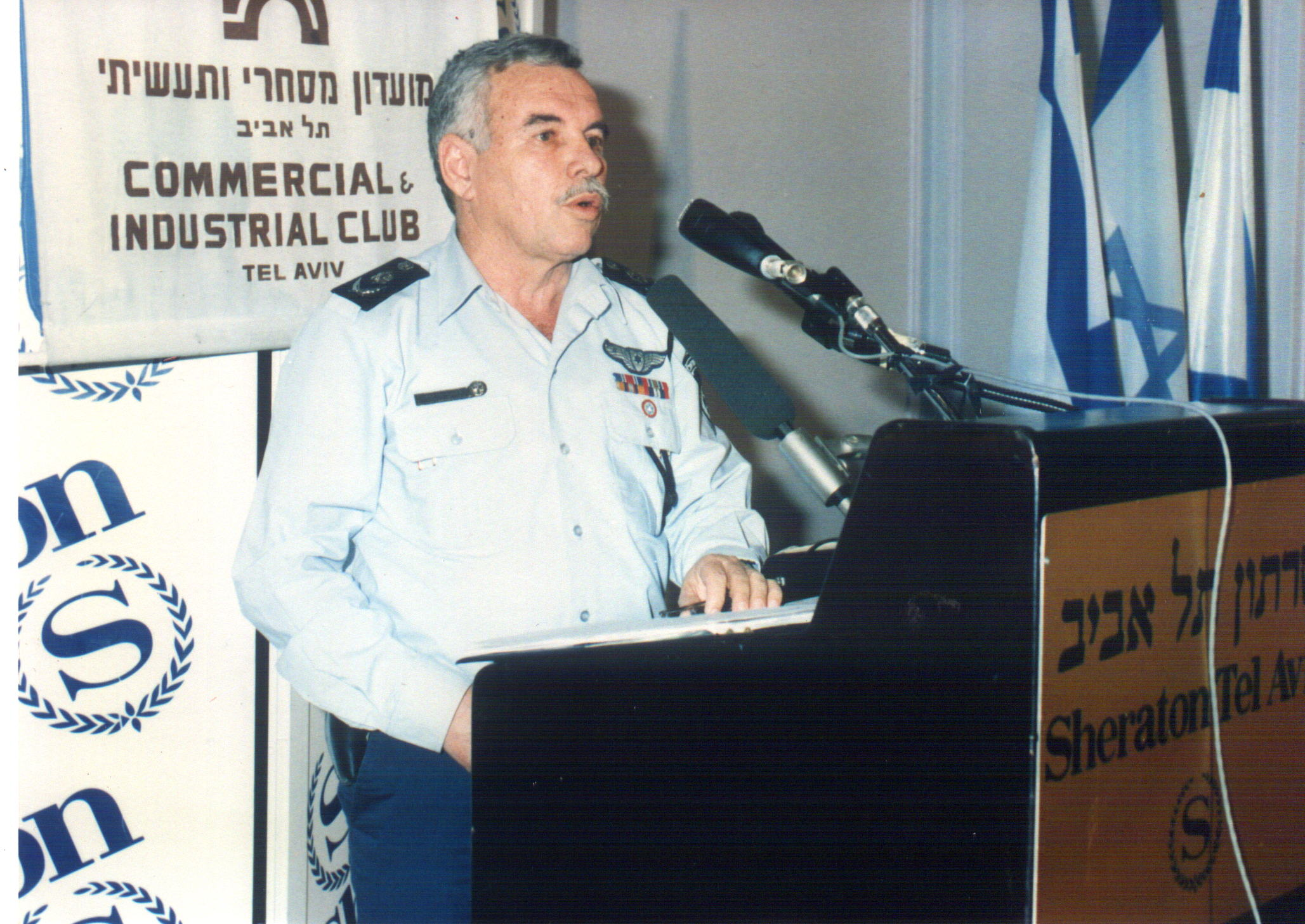

7th Mayor of Beersheba
- In office 1998–2008
- Preceded by: David Bunfeld
- Succeeded by: Ruvik Danilovich

Personal details
- Born: 27 February 1935 Kfar Yona, Mandatory Palestine
- Died: 27 October 2024 (aged 89)
- Party: Labor
- Spouse: Ariela Turner

Yaakov Turner (Hebrew: יעקב טרנר; 27 February 1935 – 27 October 2024) was an Israeli general and politician who served as the mayor of Beersheba. Prior to his election as mayor, he was an Israel Air Force pilot and the country's Chief of Police. Turner was the founder and head of the Israeli Air Force Museum.

== Early life ==
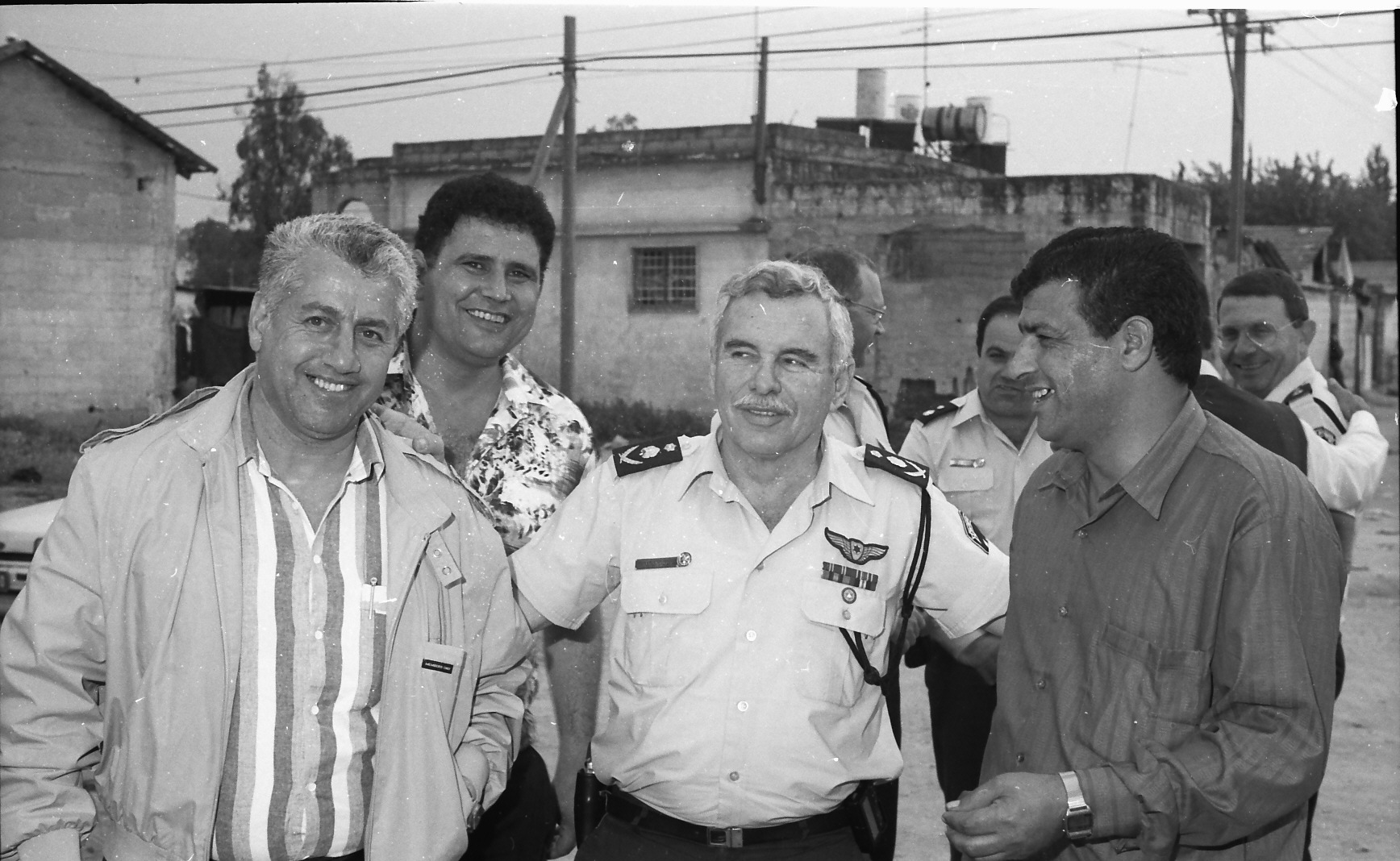
Turner visiting Lod as chief of police

Yaakov Turner was born in Kfar Yona, Mandatory Palestine, to Jewish parents from Hungary and Poland. He graduated from Ben Gurion University of the Negev with a major in behavioral sciences.

== Military and police career ==
Turner enlisted in the Israeli Air Force in 1953 and retired in 1985 as a brigadier general. In the Yom Kippur War he was an F-4 Phantom II pilot, and in the Six-Day War and the War of Attrition, he was the commander of an air combat squadron.

In 1985 he founded the Israeli Air Force Museum in Hatzerim airbase near Beersheba.

After his military service, he joined the Israel Police, where he became general commissioner (commander of the police) in 1990, a position he held until 1993. Turner served as president of the Israeli branch of the International Police Association.

== Mayor ==
In 1998, Turner was elected mayor of Beersheba. He was elected on a local list, but with the support of the Israeli Labor Party. He was re-elected in 2003, but lost the elections in 2008 to his former deputy mayor, Ruvik Danilovich. Turner won 30 percent of the vote versus 60 percent for Danilovich.

The Yaakov Turner Sports Complex, named for him, includes the 16,000-seat Turner Stadium, multifunctional sport hall and practice fields.

== Death ==
Turner died on 27 October 2024, at the age of 89.
