= National Justice Party =

National Justice Party may refer to:

- National Justice Party (Malaysia)
- National Justice Party (Peru)
- National Justice Party (United States)

== See also ==
- Justice Party (disambiguation)
