= 1998 Israeli municipal elections =

Local elections in several municipalities and councils in Israel

Municipal Elections took place in Israel on 10 November 1998

== Elections in Major Cities ==
In Jerusalem, incumbent mayor Ehud Olmert was challenged by six candidates, most notably Shimon Shetreet, who was supported by Labor, Shinui, and the Third Way party. Olmert won around 97,000 votes, and 61% of the vote. Sheetrit won around 23% of the vote. the City Council was divided between Olmert's "United Jerusalem" list (which won 3 seats in the council), and United Torah Judaism (who won 7 seats), Shas (who won 5 seats), Meretz and Mafdal (who won 3 seats each), "One Jerusalem" (who won 2 seats) and "Jerusalem Now" (who won 2 seats). Yehoram Gaon's list and the "There is a Future in Jerusalem" list won one seat each. Likud, Gesher, Moledet and Tzomet did not cross the City Council's electoral threshold.

In Tel Aviv, 27 electoral lists ran to fill the City Council's 31 seats. incumbent mayor Roni Milo decided not to seek re-election. several candidates ran to replace him, including Ron Huldai (Milo's protegé and Deputy), Doron Rubin and actor Samuel Vilozny. Huldai won around 65,000 votes, which made up around 50.3% of the vote. Rubin won around 25% of the vote and Vilozny around 13.5%. The City Council was divided between Huldai's "One Tel Aviv" (who won 5 seats), Meretz and the Likud (who won 4 seats each), Shas, Dor Shalem, and "Power to Retirees" (who won 3 seats Each), The Greens, the Doron List and the "Our City" list (who won 2 seats each), and Mafdal, the Secular List and United Torah Judaism, who won one seat each. Yisrael BaAliyah did not cross the City Council's electoral threshold.

In Haifa, incumbent mayor Amram Mitzna was not contested by any major candidate, and won over 64% of the vote. In the City Council, Mitzna's list lost 5 of its seats, falling from 13 seats to 7. Our Haifa-the Greens won 4 seats, as did Yisrael BaAliyah. Dor Shalem and the Likud won 3 seats each, Shas-United Torah Judaism, "The Haifans", Hadash and Mafdal won 2 seats each, "Lekach" and the Likud won one seat each. Gesher did not cross the city council's electoral threshold.

In Beersheba, 21 electoral lists ran to fill the city council's 31 seats. two major candidates, incumbent mayor David Bonnfeld of the Likud and Yaakov Turner of "One Beersheba" ran for Mayor. Turner defeated Bonnfeld, winning 59% of the vote to Bonnfeld's 39%. In the city council, Turner's list won 7 seats, the Likud won 3, Yisrael Ba'aliyah 5, Shas 3, Mafdal and Agudat Yisrael won 2 seats each, Labor won 1 seats, and 4 local lists won 6 seats each.

== Other Elections ==
=== Herzliya ===
Seven candidates ran for mayor in Herzliya, most notably Yael German (as the candidate of Meretz), Yehuda Urieli (under the Independent list) and Haim Feld (under the 'Feld for Herzliya' List). German won around 32% of the vote in the first round, Urieli won around 26% and Feld won around 25%. in the second round, German defeated Urieli, winning around 25,000 votes to Urieli's approximately 13,000.

Composition of the City Council:

- Meretz - 6 Seats
- Feld for Herzliya - 4 Seats
- Mafdal-One Israel - 2 Seats
- One Herzliya - 2 Seats Likud - 2 Seats
- Independent List - 2 Seats
- Shas - 1 Seat

=== Kfar Saba ===
Five candidates ran for mayor in Kfar Saba. Yitzhak Vlad won 26% of the vote, Amiram Miller won 23%, Yoel Carol won 22%, Ya'akov Ohion won 16% and Daniel Adler won 8% of the vote in the first round. In the second round, Vlad defeated Miller in the second round, winning approximately 13,000 votes to Miller's approximately 11,500.

Composition of the City Council:

- Labor - 4 Seats
- Meretz - 4 Seats
- Our Kfar Saba - 3 Seats
- Likud-Gesher-Tzomet - 2 Seats
- Mafdal - 2 Seats
- Shas - 2 Seats
- Kfar Saba 2000 - 2 Seats
- Yisrael Ba'Aliyah - 2 Seats
- Adler List - 1 Seat

=== Ra'anana ===
in Ra'anana, Ze'ev Bielski won around 72% of the vote.

Composition of the City Council:

- Bielski's Independent List - 4 Seats
- Meretz - 4 Seats
- Labor - 4 Seats
- Religious List - 3 Seats
- Likud - 2 Seats
- Dan Baruch List - 1 Seat
- Shas - 1 Seat

=== Ashdod ===
In Ashdod, incumbent mayor Zvi Zilker was re-elected with around 64% of the vote, he defeated Yehiel Lasri, who won around 32%.

Composition of the City Council:

- Ashdod Beitenu - 9 Seats
- Shas - 4 Seats
- United Torah Judaism - 2 Seats
- New Ashdod led by Lassri - 2 Seats
- Ometz led by Ilan Gilon - 2 Seats
- Likud - 2 Seats
- Ashdod - 2 Seats
- Voice of the Heart - 1 Seat
- Unity for Ashdod - 1 Seat

=== Givatayim ===
In Givatayim, incumbent Labor Party Mayor Ephraim Stenzler was re-elected with around 52% of the vote. he defeated several candidates, including the Likud's Amir Grinboym, who won around 21%.

Composition of the City Council:

- Labor - 6 Seats
- Meretz - 3 Seats
- Givatayim's youths - 3 Seats
- Likud-Tzomet-Yisrael BaAliyah - 2 Seats
- Mafdal - 2 Seats
- Only Givatayim - 1 Seat
- Givatayim Forwards - 1 Seat

=== Sderot ===
In Sderot, 3 main candidates ran for Mayor. David Buskila, who won around 38% of the vote in the first round, Eli Moyal. who won around 34%, and herzl Shauli, who won around 16%. in the second round, Moyal defeated Buskila, winning around 52% of the vote to Buskila's 48%. the City Council was divided between a joint Shas-Labor List (who won 4 Seats), Yisrael BaAliyah (who won 3), and One Nation, Gesher, Otzma, and 'a new Life', who won 2 seats each. Likud and Mafdal did not cross the City Council's electoral threshold.
