= SJP =

SJP may stand for:

== Football stadiums in England ==
- St James Park (Exeter), Exeter City stadium
- St James' Park, Newcastle United stadium

== Politics ==
- Samajbadi Janata Party, a political party in Nepal
- Scottish Jacobite Party, a political party
- Singapore Justice Party, a political party
- Social Justice Party (disambiguation), the name of various political parties
- Society of Justice Party, a political party in Cambodia
- Students for Justice in Palestine, activist organisation across several countries

== Schools ==
- Saint John's Preparatory School (Minnesota), United States
- St. John's Preparatory School (Massachusetts), United States
- St John Payne Catholic School, a secondary school in Essex, England
- St John Plessington Catholic College, a secondary school in Merseyside, England

== Transport codes ==
- São José do Rio Preto Airport, IATA code SJP, São Paulo state, Brazil
- Shujalpur railway station, Madhya Pradesh, India
- Shijiazhuang railway station, Hebei, China, telegraph code SJP
- St James Park railway station, Devon, England, station code SJP

== Other uses ==
- Sarah Jessica Parker, actress
- Single justice procedure, simplified legal procedure in England and Wales
- St. James's Place plc, a UK financial company
- Surjapuri language of eastern India (ISO 639-3 code: sjp)
