= Opinion polling for the 2009 Israeli legislative election =

Collection of opinion polls regarding the 2009 Israeli legislative election

This article provides a collection of opinion polls that were conducted relating to the 2009 Israeli legislative election.

== Notes ==
- Israeli law requires a 2% threshold (yielding a minimum of two seats) for a party to be seated in the Knesset. Therefore, surveys that poll only one seat for a party reveal limited support that would not actually result in their seating.
- Where contradictions in sources are found, the table lists the result from the original source, where available, or the majority of other sources. These are noted and referenced below.
- The three main Arab parties (United Arab List-Ta'al, Hadash, and Balad) are grouped together when no source reveals how they were polled separately. On December 22, 2008, the Israeli Elections Committee delivered a court order mandating that media list these parties by name.
- In December 2008, the National Union was reconstituted as a separate party from The Jewish Home. Prior to then, surveys polled these groups collectively.

== Polling ==
Date	Media	Pollster	Kadima	Labor	Shas	Likud	Yisrael Beiteinu	UAL -Ta'al	Hadash	Balad	Jewish Home	National Union	Gil	UTJ	Meretz	Greens	Other	Sources
Feb 10, 2009		Final Results	28	13	11	27	15	4	4	3	3	4	—	5	3	—		
Feb 6, 2009	Channel 1	Midgam Research	23	16	10	28	19	4	4	2	3	3	0	5	5	0		
Feb 6, 2009	Channel 10	Dialog	25	14	9	27	19	3	3	2	2	4	0	6	6	0		
Feb 6, 2009	Haaretz	Dialog	25	14	9	27	18	3	3	2	2	4	0	6	7	0		
Feb 6, 2009	The Jerusalem Post	Smith	23	15-16	10	26	17-18	3-4	4	2-4	3-4	3-4	0	5	5	0		
Feb 6, 2009	Maariv	TNS Teleseker	23	17	10	26	19	4	4	2	3	3	2	5	6	0		
Feb 6, 2009	Yedioth Ahronoth	Dahaf	23	16	10	25	19	3	4	2	3	4	0	6	5	0		
Feb 5, 2009	Channel 2	Panels	25	14	10	26	18	3	4	2	3	4	0	5	6	0		
Feb 5, 2009	Globes	Geocartography	22-23	15-16	10	26	20-21	3	5	0	2	6	0	5	5	0		
Feb 5, 2009	Israel Hayom	Gal Hadash (New Wave)	24	16	9	30	17	3	5	0	2	3	0	5	6	0		
Feb 5, 2009	Israel Radio's "Hakol Diburim" (It's All Talk)	Shvakim Panorama	21	16	11	25	16	3	4	2	4	4	2	7	5	0		
Feb 5, 2009	Makor Rishon	Maagar Mochot	24	13	10	27	18	9			3	2	1	6	5	1	Meimad 1	
Feb 4, 2009	Channel 2's "Mishal Cham"	Maagar Mochot	23	13	10	26	19	2	4	3	3	2	1	6	6	1	Ale Yarok 1	
Feb 4, 2009	Maariv	TNS Teleseker	23	17	10	27	17	4	4	0	3	4	2	5	6	0		
Feb 3, 2009		Maagar Mochot	23	12-13	10-11	30-31	17-18	10			3	2	0	6	4	1		
Feb 3, 2009	Globes	Geocartography	21	17	11	24-25	17	2	2	2	2	6	2	5	8-9	0		
Feb 2, 2009	Channel 1	Midgam Research	23	17	10	28	18	2	4	2	4	3	0	5	4	0		
Feb 2, 2009	Channel 2	Panels	24	14	11	27	17	4	3	2	3	4	0	5	6	0		
Jan 30, 2009	Maariv	TNS Teleseker	23	17	10	28	16	4	4	0	4	3	0	5	6	0		
Jan 29, 2009	Channel 2	Panels	23	13	10	29	16	4	4	2	3	4	0	5	5	2		
Jan 29, 2009	Globes	Geocartography	23	15	10	31	16	0	4	0	3	5	0	6	7	0		
Jan 29, 2009	Haaretz/Channel 10	Dialog	25	14	10	28	15	4	3	2	3	4	2	5	5	0		
Jan 28, 2009	Israel Radio's "Hakol Diburim" (It's All Talk)	Shvakim Panorama	20	16	11	29	16	3	3	3	3	3	2	7	4	0		
Jan 27, 2009	Channel 2's "Mishal Cham"	Maagar Mochot	22	13	10	34	16	3	4	3	3	2	0	5	5	0		
Jan 26, 2009	Channel 2	Panels	22	15	11	29	16	4	4	2	0	5	0	6	6	0		
Jan 25, 2009	Channel 1	Midgam Research	22	17	10	30	16	3	3	3	3	3	0	5	5	0		
Jan 23, 2009	Channel 1's Friday Diary	Shvakim Panorama	20	17	11	29	14	3	3	4	3	3	0	7	6	0		
Jan 23, 2009	Maariv	TNS Teleseker	24	16	9	28	16	3	4	2	4	2	0	6	6	0		
Jan 23, 2009	Yedioth Ahronoth	Dahaf	25	17	10	29	14	3	4	2	2	3	0	6	5	0		
Jan 22, 2009	Channel 2	Panels	24	15	10	30	15	4	3	2	2	4	0	5	6	0		
Jan 22, 2009	Globes	Geocartography	21	15	9	32	16	4	3	3	4	3	0	5	5	0		
Jan 22, 2009	Israel Hayom	Gal Hadash (New Wave)	25	15	9	35	12	3	4	2	2	2	0	5	6	0		
Jan 20, 2009	Channel 1	Geocartography	21	15	9	33	13	4	3	3	4	3	0	7	5	0		
Jan 20, 2009	Channel 2's "Mishal Cham"	Maagar Mochot	22	14	11	30	16	2	4	3	2	2	0	5	7	0	Meimad 1, Ale Yarok 1	
Jan 19, 2009	Channel 2	Panels	24	14	10	30	15	3	4	2	2	4	0	5	5	2		
Jan 18, 2009	Channel 2	Maagar Mochot	23	15	12	31	13	3	4	2	3	1	1	5	6	1		
Jan 18, 2009	Channel 10	Dialog	26	14	10	29	14	3	3	2	2	4	0	5	6	2		
Jan 16, 2009	Haaretz	Dialog	25	16	9	29	12	3	3	2	3	3	0	6	7	2		
Jan 16, 2009	Maariv	TNS Teleseker	26	17	9	28	14	4	4	2	3	3	0	5	5	0		
Jan 15, 2009	Channel 2	Panels	27	15	8	29	13	3	4	3	2	4	0	5	5	2		
Jan 15, 2009	Globes	Geocartography	22	16	10	33	14	3	3	4	3	0	0	7	5	0		
Jan 14, 2009	Israel Radio's "Hakol Diburim" (It's All Talk)	Shvakim Panorama	21	15	10	28	15	4	3	3	3	3	0	7	5	3		
Jan 13, 2009	Channel 2's "Mishal Cham"	Maagar Mochot	26	16	10	28	14	3	4	3	3	2	0	5	6	0		
Jan 12, 2009	Channel 2	Panels	28	13	8	33	13	2	4	3	0	4	0	5	5	2		
Jan 9, 2009	Channel 1's Friday Diary	Shvakim Panorama	22	16	10	31	14	10			4	0	0	7	6	0		
Jan 9, 2009	Maariv	TNS Teleseker	27	17	9	29	13	10			4	0	0	6	5	0		
Jan 8, 2009	Knesset Channel	Panels	27	15	9	31	12	0	4	3	2	4	0	4	5	2		
Jan 8, 2009	Israel Hayom	Gal Hadash (New Wave)	27	15	10	33	10	2	4	4	0	3	0	5	7	0		
Jan 7, 2009	Channel 10	Dialog	27	16	11	31	10	3	3	0	2	3	0	5	7	0		
Jan 7, 2009	Radius Radio 100FM	Geocartography	27	12	7	33	11	10			5	3	0	4	6	2		
Jan 6, 2009	Channel 2's "Mishal Cham"	Maagar Mochot	25	17	10	32	10	9			4	2	0	5	6	0		
Jan 5, 2009	Channel 2	Panels	28	15	9	31	13	4	3	2	2	4	0	4	5	0		
Jan 2, 2009	The Jerusalem Post	Smith	29	15	10	23	12	10			5	2	0	6	6	2		
Jan 2, 2009	Maariv	TNS Teleseker	28	16	11	28	12	10			4	0	0	5	6	0		
Jan 1, 2009	Channel 2	Panels	27	14	8	30	11	10			3	3	0	6	7	1		
Jan 1, 2009	Globes	Geocartography	22	12	8	38	15	10			3	0	0	4	6	2		
Jan 1, 2009	Haaretz	Dialog	27	16	9	32	11	4	4	2	3	0	0	5	7	0		
Dec 30, 2008	Channel 2's "Mishal Cham"	Maagar Mochot	25	15	10	31	10	10			4	1	2	5	5	2		
Dec 29, 2008	Channel 2	Panels	29	14	8	29	13	10			3	3	0	4	7	0		
Dec 28, 2008	Haaretz/Channel 10	Dialog	28	16	10	30	10	3	4	3	2		1	5	7	1		
Dec 26, 2008	Maariv	TNS Teleseker	30	11	10	29	12	10			3		2	5	7	0		
Dec 25, 2008	Channel 2	Panels	27	11	10	30	10	3	4	3	6		0	4	7	2	Hatikva 3	
Dec 25, 2008	Haaretz	Dialog	26	11	13	30	11	3	3	2	6		2	5	8	0		
Dec 25, 2008	Yedioth Ahronoth	Dahaf	26	12	10	30	12	9			5		0	6	7	3		
Dec 24, 2008	Channel 1	Midgam Research	25	11	10	31	12	10			5		0	7	6	3		
Dec 24, 2008	Channel 2	Maagar Mochot	25	10	12	29	12	3	4	2	4		1	6	8	4		
Dec 24, 2008	Israel Radio's "Hakol Diburim" (It's All Talk)	Shvakim Panorama	23	14	12	32	12	10			4		0	7	6	0		
Dec 24, 2008	Radius Radio 100FM	Geocartography	23	9	9	35	11	10			5		0	5	10	3		
Dec 23, 2008	Channel 1	Geocartography	26	9-10	8-9	34	10	4	3	3	6		0	6	9	0-2		
Dec 23, 2008	Channel 2's "Mishal Cham"	Maagar Mochot	25	11	12	31	13	9			5		2	5	6	1		
Dec 22, 2008	Channel 2	Panels	29	10	10	28	11	10			5		0	5	6	3	Hatikva 3	
Dec 19, 2008	Maariv	TNS Teleseker	30	12	9	30	12	4	3	3	5		0	5	7	0		
Dec 18, 2008	Channel 2	Panels	30	10	10	29	11	9			6		0	6	6	3		
Dec 16, 2008	Channel 2's "Mishal Cham"	Maagar Mochot	25	10	12	29	12	9			4		1	6	8	4		
Dec 15, 2008	Channel 2	Panels	27	13	11	31	10	10			5		0	5	6	2		
Dec 11, 2008	Maariv	TNS Teleseker	28	12	9	31	11	10			6		0	5	5	3		
Dec 10, 2008	Haaretz	Dialog	27	12	9	36	9	4	4	3	4		0	6	6	0		
Dec 10, 2008	Israel Radio's "Hakol Diburim" (It's All Talk)	Shvakim Panorama	20-21	14-15	12	34-35	11	9-10			4		0	7	6	0		
Dec 10, 2008	Yedioth Ahronoth	Dahaf	24	11	11	31	10	10			6		0	7	7	3		
Dec 4, 2008	Knesset Channel	Panels	27	7	11	34	10	10			6		0	5	7	3		
Dec 1, 2008	Channel 2	Panels	25	6	12	33	11	10			7		0	5	7	4		
Dec 1, 2008	Israel Hayom	Gal Hadash (New Wave)	26	8	10	35	10	10			5		2	5	7	2		
Nov 27, 2008	Knesset Channel	Panels	26	7	10	35	9	10			6		0	6	8	3		
Nov 25, 2008	Channel 1	Geocartography	25	7	11	37	8	9			4		0	8	8	3		
Nov 20, 2008	Haaretz	Dialog	28	10	10	34	10	4	5	2	4		0	6	7	0		
Nov 20, 2008	Yedioth Ahronoth	Dahaf	26	8	11	32	9	11			6		0	7	7	3		
Nov 19, 2008	Israel Radio's "Hakol Diburim" (It's All Talk)	Maagar Mochot	23	8	13	34	10	9			7		0	5	10	1		
Nov 13, 2008	Israel Hayom	Gal Hadash (New Wave)	28	11	10	33	7	10			6		0	5	7	3		
Oct 31, 2008	The Jerusalem Post	Smith	27	14	11	27	11	10			9		0	6	5	0		
Oct 30, 2008	Haaretz	Dialog	31	10	10	31	11	2	6	3	3		0	6	5	2		
Oct 30, 2008	Israel Hayom	Gal Hadash (New Wave)	30	13	10	31	8	10			6		0	5	5	2		
Oct 29, 2008	Israel Radio's "Hakol Diburim" (It's All Talk)	Shvakim Panorama	22-23	16-17	11-12	25-26	10-11	9-10			7-8		1-2	6-7	5-6	2-3		
Oct 28, 2008	Channel 1	Geocartography	32	10	9	28	9	10										
Oct 27, 2008	Maariv	TNS Teleseker	31	11	8	29	11	11			7		0	4	5	3		
Oct 27, 2008	Yedioth Ahronoth	Dahaf	29	11	11	26	9	4	3	3	7		2	7	6	2		
Sep 11, 2008	Maariv	TNS Teleseker	25	14	9	29	12	10			8		0	5	4	2	Social Justice 2	
Aug 29, 2008	Maariv	TNS Teleseker	23	12	9	31	12	10			8		0	6	5	0	Social Justice 4	
Aug 1, 2008	Haaretz	Dialog	26	14	11	25	11	11			6		0	7	5	2	Social Justice 2	
Aug 1, 2008	Maariv	TNS Teleseker	20	17	9	33	12	10			6		0	4	4	0	Social Justice 5	
Aug 1, 2008	Yedioth Ahronoth	Dahaf	29	14	10	30	8	10			6		0	6	5	0	Social Justice 2	
Mar 28, 2006		Current Composition	29	19	12	12	11	4	3	3	3	6	7	6	5	0		
Date	Media	Pollster	Kadima	Labor	Shas	Likud	Yisrael Beiteinu	UAL -Ta'al	Hadash	Balad	Jewish Home	National Union	Gil	UTJ	Meretz	Greens	Other	Sources
