= Freedom and Justice Party =

Freedom and Justice Party may refer to:

- Centre-Right Union, a Lithuanian political party formerly known as "Freedom and Justice"
- Freedom and Justice Party (Egypt)
- Russian Party of Freedom and Justice
- Party of Freedom and Justice (Stranka slobode i pravde), a political party in Serbia

== See also ==
- Justice and Freedom Party (Fiji)
- Freedom and Social Justice (Palestinian Authority)
- Freedom Party (disambiguation)
- Justice Party (disambiguation)
