= Justice Party =

Justice Party is the name of several different political parties around the world:

- Justicialist Party, Argentina
- Henry George Justice Party, Australia
- Derryn Hinch's Justice Party, Australia
- Justice Party (Azerbaijan)
- Justice Party (Burma)
- Justice Party of Denmark
- Justice Party (Egypt)
- Justice Party (Ghana)
- Justice Party (Guyana)
- Justice Party (India), 1916-1944
- Indian Justice Party, 2003-2014
- Justice Party (Indonesia)
- Prosperous Justice Party, Indonesia
- Communist Party of Persia, founded as Justice Party
- Justice Party (Iran)
- Justice Party (Kosovo)
- Justice Party (Maldives)
- Justice Party (Nigeria)
- Justice Party (Norway)
- Justice Party (Pakistan)
- Justice Party (Philippines)
- Singapore Justice Party
- Justice Party (South Korea)
- Justice Party - the Socialists, Sweden
- Justice Party (Tajikistan)
- Justice Party (Turkey)
- Justice Party (Ukraine)
- Justice (parliamentary group), Ukraine
- People's Justice Party (UK)
- Justice Party (2001 UK)
- Justice Party (United States)
- Justice Social Democratic Party, Uzbekistan

== See also ==
- Justice and Development Party (disambiguation)
- Freedom and Justice Party (disambiguation)
- Social Justice Party (disambiguation)
