= Kfar Yona =

Kfar Yona כפר יונה
- City

Hebrew transcription(s)
  - Also spelled: Kefar Yona (official)
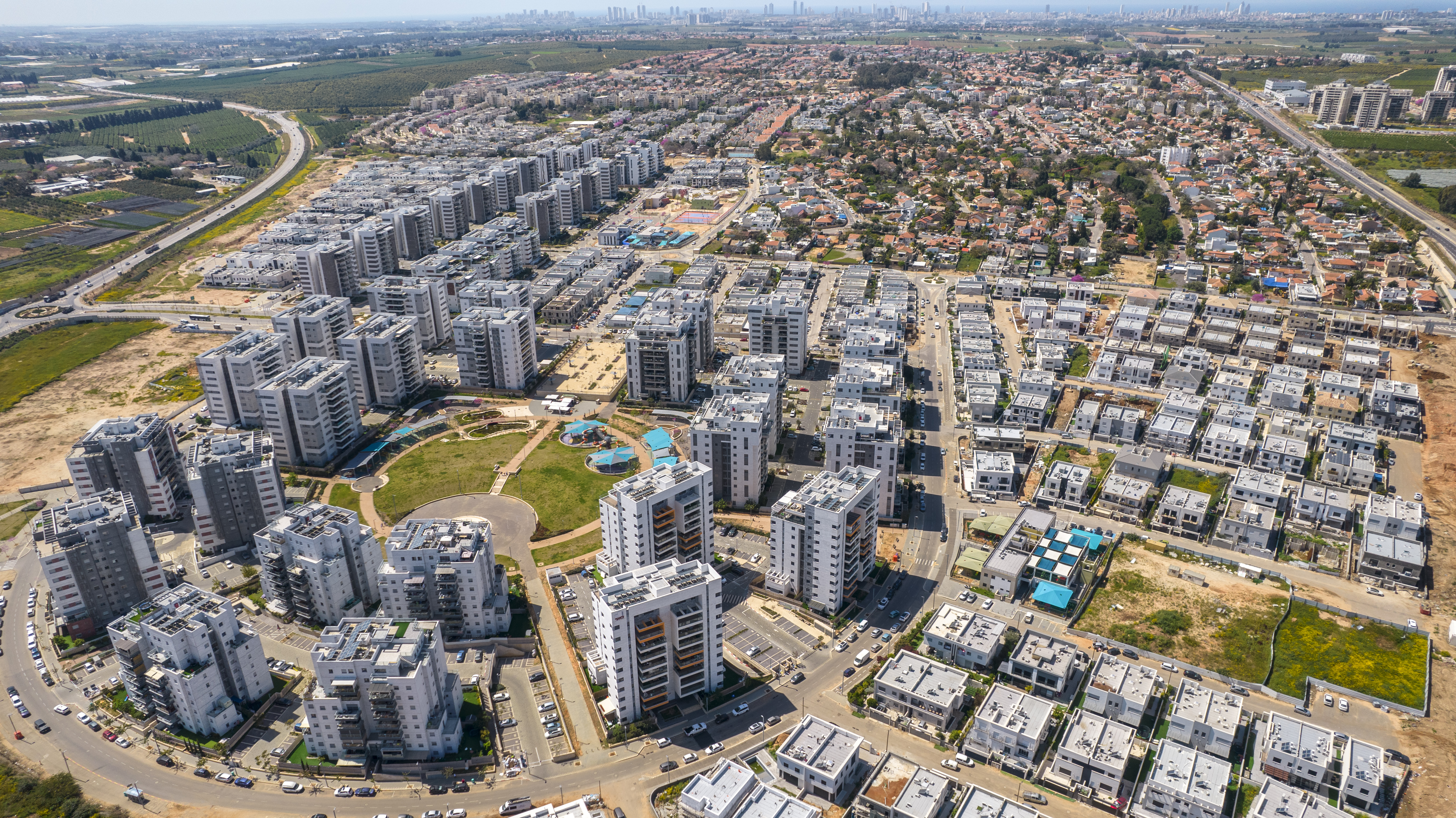
- View of Kfar Yona in 2023

- Location within Central Israel Location within Israel
- Coordinates: 32°19′1.57″N 34°56′8.74″E
- Country: Israel
- District: Central
- Subdistrict: HaSharon
- Natural Region: Western Sharon
- Founded: 23 January 1932

Government
  - Mayor: Albert Tayeb

Area
  - Total: 11 km^{2} (4.2 sq mi)

Population (2024)
  - Total: 29,820
  - Density: 2,700/km^{2} (7,000/sq mi)

Ethnicity
  - Jews and others: 99.9%
  - Arabs: 0.1%
- Name meaning: Yona's Village
- Website: kfar-yona.muni.il

Kfar Yona (Hebrew: כפר יונה, lit. 'Yona's Village') is a city in the Central District of Israel. It is located between the cities Netanya and Tulkarm in the West Bank, about 8 km east of Netanya in the central junction between Highway 6 and Highway 4. The village was established in 1932 by Maurice Fischer and was declared a local council in the year 1940. Following developments in the fields of construction, industry, and education, the local council received city status on February 11, 2014. With a jurisdiction of 11,550 dunams (~11.55 km^{2}), in 2024 the city had a population of 29,820.

== History ==
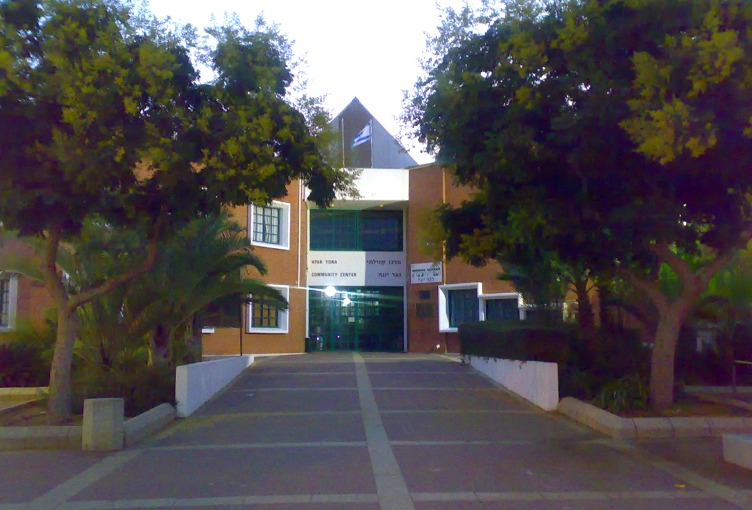

Before the 20th century, Kfar Yona formed part of the Forest of Sharon, a hallmark of the region's historical landscape. It was an open woodland dominated by Mount Tabor Oak (Quercus ithaburensis), which extended from Kfar Yona in the north to Ra’ananna in the south. The local inhabitants used the area for pasture, firewood and intermittent cultivation. The intensification of settlement and agriculture in the coastal plain during the 19th century led to deforestation and subsequent environmental degradation known from Hebrew sources.

Kfar Yona was established on lands in the Sharon plain purchased legally in 1932 from Mustafa Bushnaq and the Shanti family and named for Jean (Yona) Fischer, a Belgian Zionist. It was founded on Tu Bishvat, January 23, 1932 by Morris Fischer, Yona's son, a member of the World Jewish Congress, and was originally named Gan Yona (Yona's Garden).

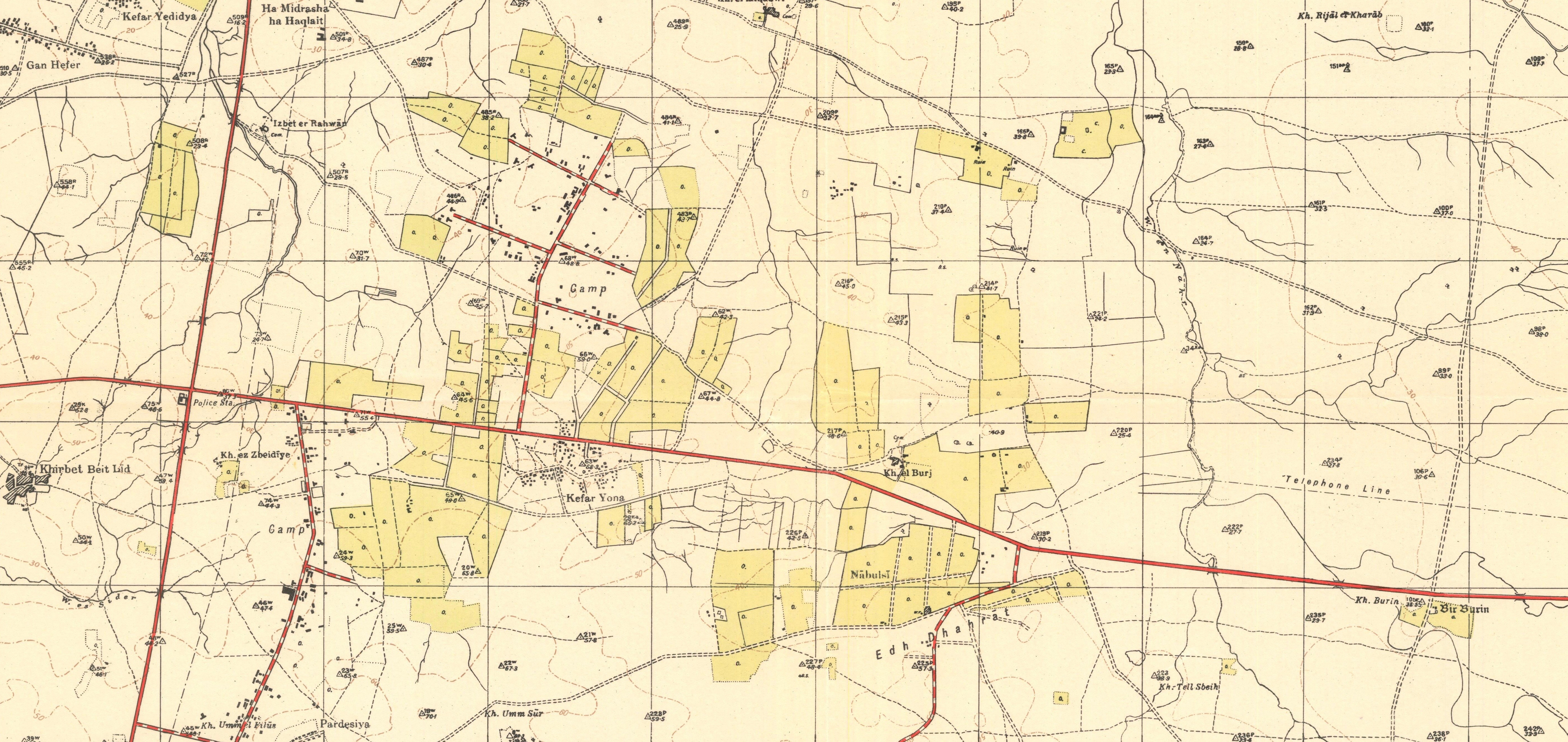
Kfar Yona (Kefar Yona) 1939 1:20,000

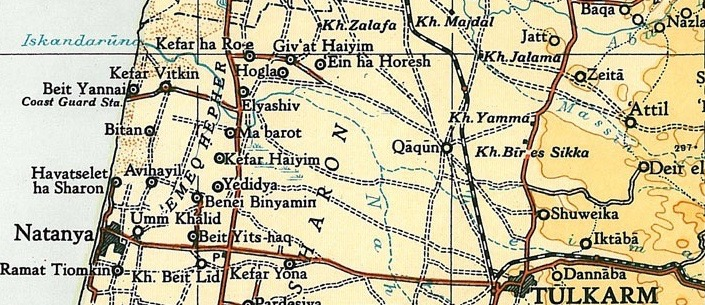
Kfar Yona (Kefar Yona) 1945 1:250,000

In the 1948 Arab-Israeli War, Kfar Yona was on the front lines, and its defenders faced the Iraqi Army, which sought to reach Netanya and cut the Jewish forces in Israel in half. The new Israel Defense Forces repelled the Iraqi attacks and forced them back into the Samarian mountains, although Kfar Yona remained the easternmost Jewish settlement in the area. As a result of the 1949 Armistice Agreements, the border moved from Kfar Yona 8 km eastward, to just west of Tulkarm.

Kfar Yona was surrounded by orchards and its main income was from selling oranges. Most of these orchards are now the site of new neighborhoods.

Next to Kfar Yona is the Area 21 military base, named for Mota Gur, which includes paratroopers, Nahal, military police, and other small bases. In addition, Kfar Yona borders Pardesiya and the Lev HaSharon Regional Council.

=== Kfar Yona Hunger Strike ===
The first Palestinian mass hunger strike occurred in a prison in Kfar Yona on February 14, 1969, in conjecture with another hunger strike at a prison in Ramla. The Palestinian prisoners protested against poor quality food and meagre portions, against the ban on writing stationery.

== Neighborhoods ==
=== Kfar Yona Alef ===
Kfar Yona Alef

The original ten homes and the first community building. The homes are small, one-story, private structures, with an average of three rooms each. The community building stands today empty and is falling into ruin, though the town council is interested in maintaining it for its sentimental and historical value. Alef also includes a new neighborhood accessed from the western entrance to the village, with recently built family homes and more under construction. The main avenue of this section of Alef is a street where residents of the village can be found walking or jogging at any hour. For the past year, the west entrance has had a gate and guard that operates from 11 pm to 6 am. The whole village is policed by a volunteer guard force, supervised by a small professional security team, for which the town residents pay a small municipal tax.

=== Kfar Yona Bet ===
Kfar Yona Bet

Cheaper apartment buildings, which are the first site of the village for visitors who enter from the eastern entrance. (Both entrances are on Highway 57, the eastern entrance is about 2 km further down the road than the western entrance, when driving from Highway 2, Israel's main Coastal Road). The east entrance is completely shut and locked from 11 pm to 6 am. Bet also includes the New Project, which are lower apartment buildings, with bigger homes. The New Project on Menachem Begin Street faces the City Council building, the Community Center (funded by Jewish Federation of Greater Vancouver sister-city fundraising activities), the community basketball courts and water park (also a gift from Vancouver), and the Hadar Elementary School (Grades 1–6). Beyond the New Project, Bet includes more expensive townhouses and private homes. It also includes the Betzali Park.

=== Heftziba ===
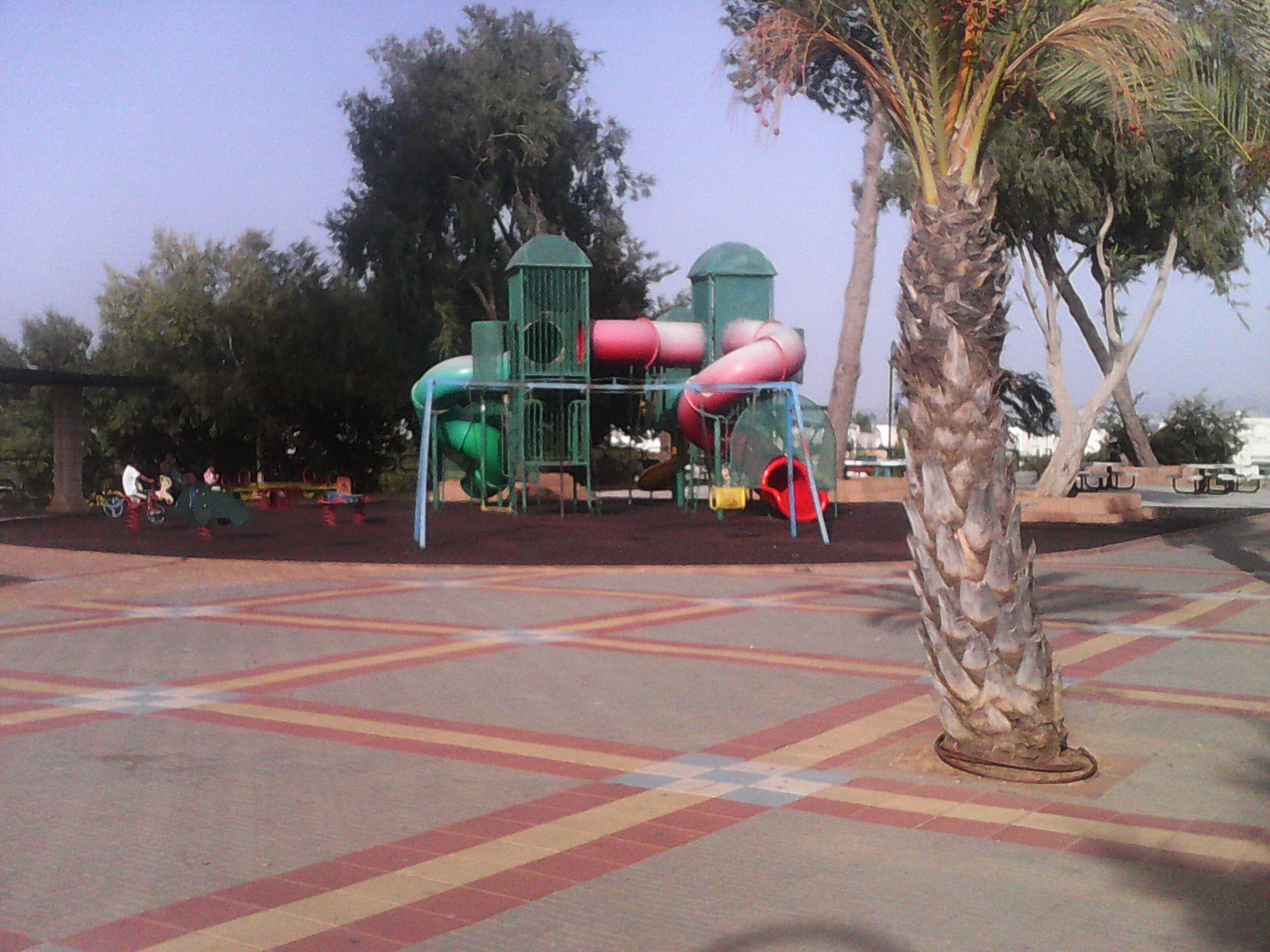
Park Heftziba

Down Menachem Begin Street is Heftziba named for the construction company that built it. Across Highway 57 is the new neighborhood of Alonim, also known as Kfar Yona Gimel. This neighborhood includes single-family homes, wide streets and several parks

== Demographics ==
Historical population
Year	Pop.	±%
1972	2,500	—
1983	3,000	+20.0%
1995	7,000	+133.3%
2008	16,500	+135.7%
2022	28,135	+70.5%
2024	29,820	+6.0%

== Sports and culture ==
The community center operates a music conservatory and holds public concerts. In 2006, 250 grade-school students participated in a basketball program. The older student's league has won championships. The community center holds classes in photography, ceramics, pottery and cooking.

== Education ==
In 2010, Kfar Yona had 3 state schools, Hadar, Rimon and Amal, and a state-religious school, Bar Ilan. The town also has a junior high and high school, Ish Shalom.

== Transportation ==
Highway 57 is the main traffic artery connecting Kfar Yona to other localities and the national road system—Netanya to the west and Highway 6 to the east.

The city has no railway connection and since 2014 has been served by the Kavim bus company, which replaced Nateev Express.

== Voting Patterns ==
In the 2022 election, 49 percent of voters in Kfar Yona voted for the parties of the center-left coalition led by Yair Lapid, while 48 percent voted for the parties of the right-wing coalition led by Benjamin Netanyahu and 0.1 percent voted for the Arab parties.

In the 2026 election, 50 percent of voters in Kfar Yona voted for the parties of the center-left coalition led by Gadi Eisenkot, while 43 percent voted for the parties of the right-wing coalition led by Benjamin Netanyahu and 0.1 percent voted for the Arab parties. An additional 4.8 percent voted for the Reservists, and 2 percent voted for Amcha Yisrael. Voter turnout increased 17 percent from the 2022 election.

== Sister cities ==
- Oranienburg, Brandenburg, Germany

== Notable people ==
- Zvi Bar
- Zoya Semenduev
- Yaakov Turner
