= Social Justice Party =

Social Justice Party may refer to:

- Social Justice Party (Egypt)
- Social Justice Party (Nagorno Karabakh)
- Social Justice Party (Somalia)
- Social Justice Party (Thailand)
- Social Justice Party (Sri Lanka)
- Social Justice Party (Romania)
- Social Justice (political party) in Israel
- Party of Social Justice in Russia
- Social Justice Party (United Kingdom)
- Samajik Nyay Manch (India)

== See also ==
- Justice Party (disambiguation)
