= Ein Mahil =

Arab town in northern Israel

Ein Mahil: עֵין מָהִל, עין מאהל; عين ماهل
- Local council (from 1964)

Hebrew transcription(s)
  - ISO 259: ʕein Máhel
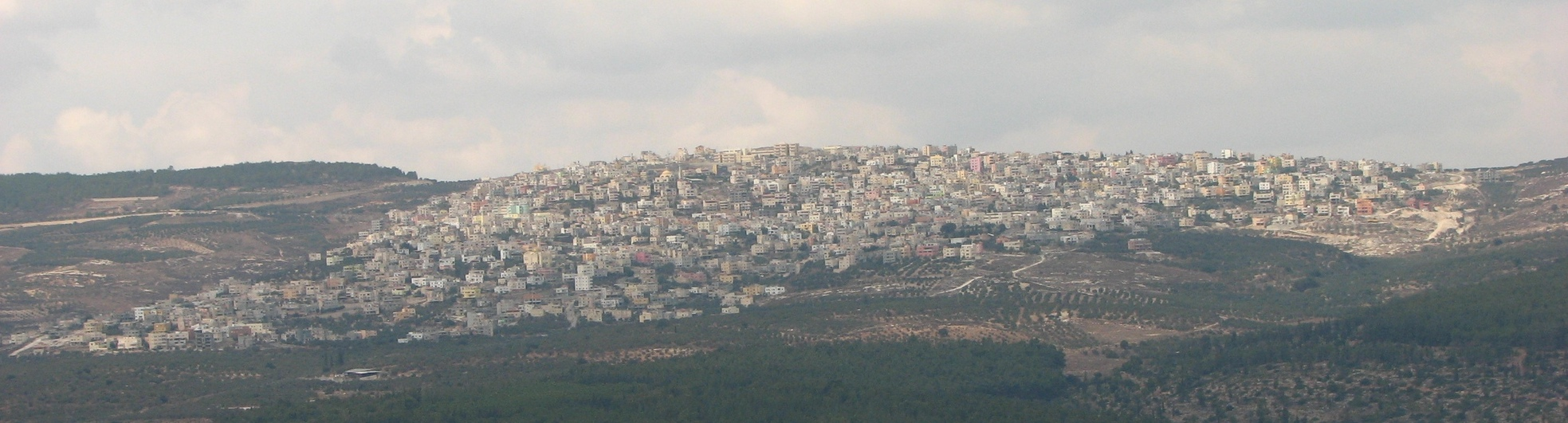

- Location within Jezreel Valley region of Israel Location within Israel
- Coordinates: 32°43′23″N 35°21′08″E
- Grid position: 183/236 PAL
- Country: Israel
- District: Northern
- Subdistrict: Jezreel
- Natural Region: Nazareth-Tir'an Mountains

Area
  - Total: 5,203 dunams (5.203 km^{2}; 2.009 sq mi)

Population (2024)
  - Total: 14,029
  - Density: 2,696/km^{2} (6,983/sq mi)
- Name meaning: "The spring of the barren land."

Ein Mahil (Arabic: عين ماهل; Hebrew: עֵין מָהִל) is an Arab local council in the Northern District of Israel, located about five kilometers north-east of Nazareth. It was declared a local council in 1964. In 2024 it had a population of 14,029; 100% were Muslims.

== History ==
=== Ottoman Empire ===
In 1596, Ein Mahil appeared in Ottoman tax registers as being in the Nahiya of Tabariyya, part of Safad Sanjak. It had a population of 28 Muslim households. They paid a fixed tax rate of 20% on agricultural products, which included wheat, barley, fruit trees, and goats or beehives; a total of 1,355 akçe. A map by Pierre Jacotin, from 1799 showed the place named Ain el Mahel.

In 1838 it was noted as a Muslim village in the Nazareth district.

The French explorer Victor Guérin passed by the village in the 1875, and described it as having 10 poor dwellings, surrounded by gardens of olives, figs and pomegranates. In 1881 the PEF's Survey of Western Palestine (SWP) described it as a "Stone village, situated on very high ground, surrounded by figs and olives and arable land. It contains about 200 Moslems, and has near it a fine group of springs."

A population list from about 1887 showed that ’Ain Mahil had about 195 Muslim inhabitants.

=== British Mandate ===
In the 1922 census of Palestine conducted by the British Mandate authorities, 'Ain Mahel had a population of 516, all Muslims. The population increased in the 1931 census of Palestine to 628, of whom 1 was Christian and the rest Muslims, in a total of 109 occupied houses.

In the 1945 statistics the population was 1,040 Muslims, with 13,390 dunams of land, according to an official land and population survey. Of this, 1,486 dunams were for plantations and irrigable land, 6,748 for cereals, while 35 dunams were built-up land.

== Demographics ==
Historical population
Year	Pop.	±%
1972	3,500	—
1983	5,300	+51.4%
1995	7,900	+49.1%
2008	10,900	+38.0%
2022	13,485	+23.7%
2024	14,029	+4.0%

== Voting Patterns ==
In the 2022 election, 97 percent of voters in Ein Mahil voted for the Arab parties, while 1 percent voted for the parties of the center-left coalition led by Yair Lapid and 1 percent voted for the parties of the right-wing coalition led by Benjamin Netanyahu. Among the voters for the Arab parties, 36 percent voted for the Hadash–Ta'al list, while 34 percent voted for Ra'am and 30 percent voted for Balad.

In the 2026 election, 99 percent of voters in Ein Mahil voted for the Arab parties, while 0.5 percent voted for the parties of the center-left coalition led by Gadi Eisenkot and 0.2 percent voted for the parties of the right-wing coalition led by Benjamin Netanyahu. Among the voters for the Arab parties, 66 percent voted for the Joint List, while 34 percent voted for Ra'am. Voter turnout increased 75 percent from the 2022 election.

== See also ==
- Arab localities in Israel

== Bibliography ==
- Barron, J.B., ed. (1923). Palestine: Report and General Abstracts of the Census of 1922. Government of Palestine.
- Conder, C.R.; Kitchener, H.H. (1881). The Survey of Western Palestine: Memoirs of the Topography, Orography, Hydrography, and Archaeology. Vol. 1. London: Committee of the Palestine Exploration Fund.
- Department of Statistics (1945). Village Statistics, April, 1945. Government of Palestine.
- Grootkerk, Salomon E. (2000). Ancient sites in Galilee: a toponymic gazetteer (Illustrated ed.). BRILL. ISBN 90-04-11535-8. (p. 292)
- Guérin, V. (1880). Description Géographique Historique et Archéologique de la Palestine (in French). Vol. 3: Galilee, pt. 1. Paris: L'Imprimerie Nationale.
- Karmon, Y. (1960). "An Analysis of Jacotin's Map of Palestine" (PDF). Israel Exploration Journal. 10 (3, 4): 155–173, 244–253. Archived from the original (PDF) on 2019-12-22.
- Hadawi, S. (1970). "Village Statistics of 1945: A Classification of Land and Area ownership in Palestine". Palestine Liberation Organization Research Center.
- Hütteroth, W.-D.; Abdulfattah, K. (1977). Historical Geography of Palestine, Transjordan and Southern Syria in the Late 16th Century. Erlanger Geographische Arbeiten, Sonderband 5. Erlangen, Germany: Vorstand der Fränkischen Geographischen Gesellschaft. ISBN 3-920405-41-2.
- Mills, E., ed. (1932). Census of Palestine 1931. Population of Villages, Towns and Administrative Areas. Jerusalem: Government of Palestine.
- Palmer, E.H. (1881). The Survey of Western Palestine: Arabic and English Name Lists Collected During the Survey by Lieutenants Conder and Kitchener, R. E. Transliterated and Explained by E.H. Palmer. Committee of the Palestine Exploration Fund.
- Rhode, H. (1979). Administration and Population of the Sancak of Safed in the Sixteenth Century. Columbia University. Archived from the original on 2020-03-01.
- Robinson, E.; Smith, E. (1841). Biblical Researches in Palestine, Mount Sinai and Arabia Petraea: A Journal of Travels in the year 1838. Vol. 3. Boston: Crocker & Brewster.
- Schumacher, G. (1888). "Population list of the Liwa of Akka". Quarterly Statement - Palestine Exploration Fund. 20: 169–191.
