= Eli Moyal =

Mayor of Sderot, Israel (1953–2020)

- אלי מויאל
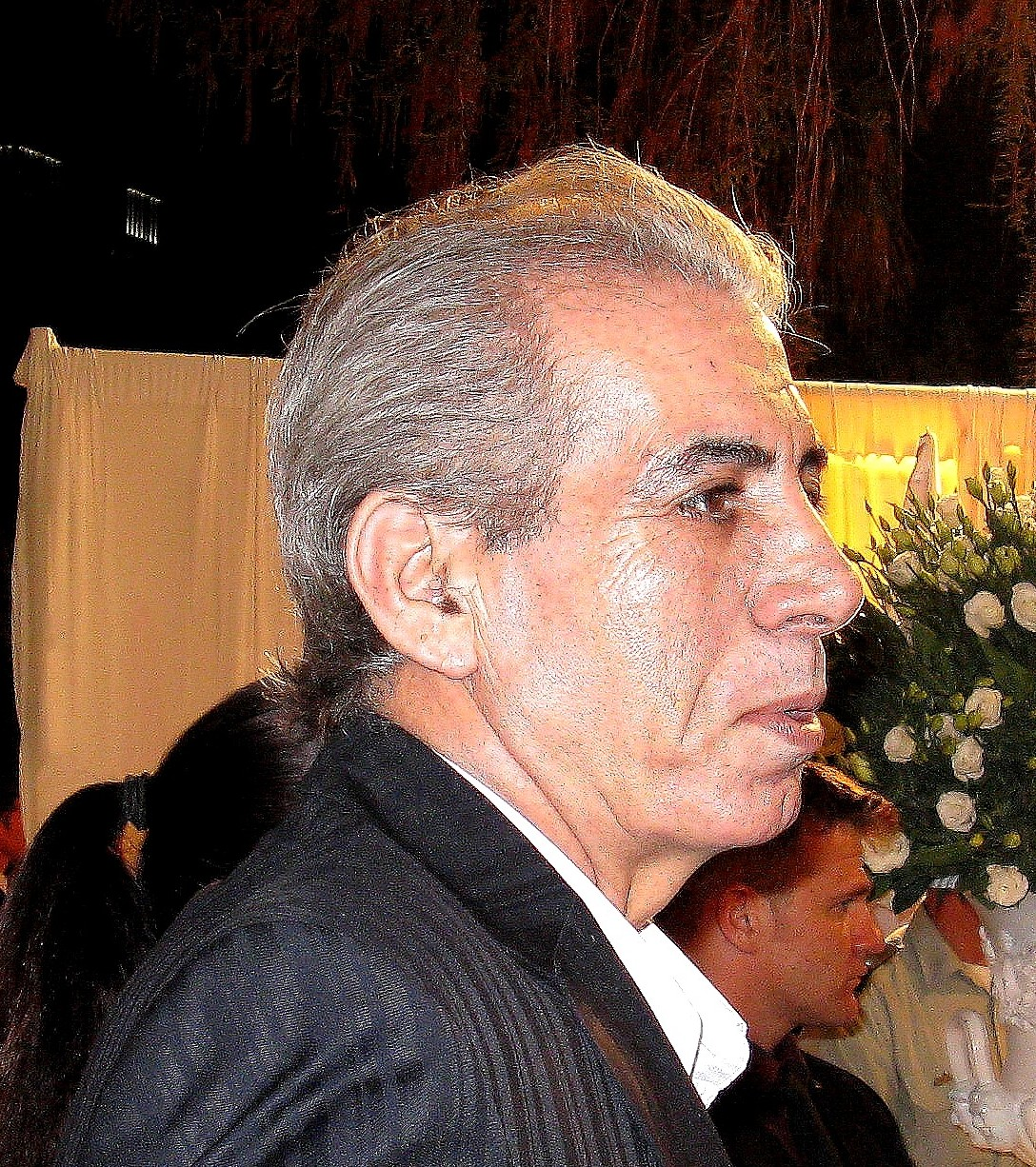
- Moyal in 2009

2nd Mayor of Sderot
- In office 1998–2008
- Preceded by: David Buskila

Personal details
- Born: 28 February 1953 Morocco
- Died: 25 February 2020 (aged 66) Sderot, Israel
- Party: Likkud

Eli Moyal (Hebrew: אלי מויאל; 1953–2020) was an Israeli politician and the mayor of Sderot between 1998 and 2008.

== Biography ==
Moyal was born in a village in Morocco in the early 1950s. He was probably born in 1953 (Note: At the time of his death in 2020, most sources reported his age as 67.) In an interview in 2004 he said that he was born in a winter, some time between 1952 and 1955 (and his parents only remembered the date by the Weekly Torah portion, and that eventually the date Feb 28th 1951 was chosen. In a television interview in December 2017 stated that according to family lore he was roughly 68 at the time. The family emigrated to Israel in 1957. At the age of 10 he was sent to a boarding school in Kfar Haroeh. Later he moved to Jerusalem and attended the Lifshitz College of Education and at the age of 17 he worked for a year as a teacher in his home town of Sderot.

After a military service, Moyal studied law at the Hebrew University of Jerusalem, graduated and opened an office in Jerusalem. In 1991, following the 1991 Iraqi missile attacks against Israel, he created a branch of his office in Sderot and eventually moved there.
