= Ruvik Danilovich =

Israeli politician

- רוביק דנילוביץ
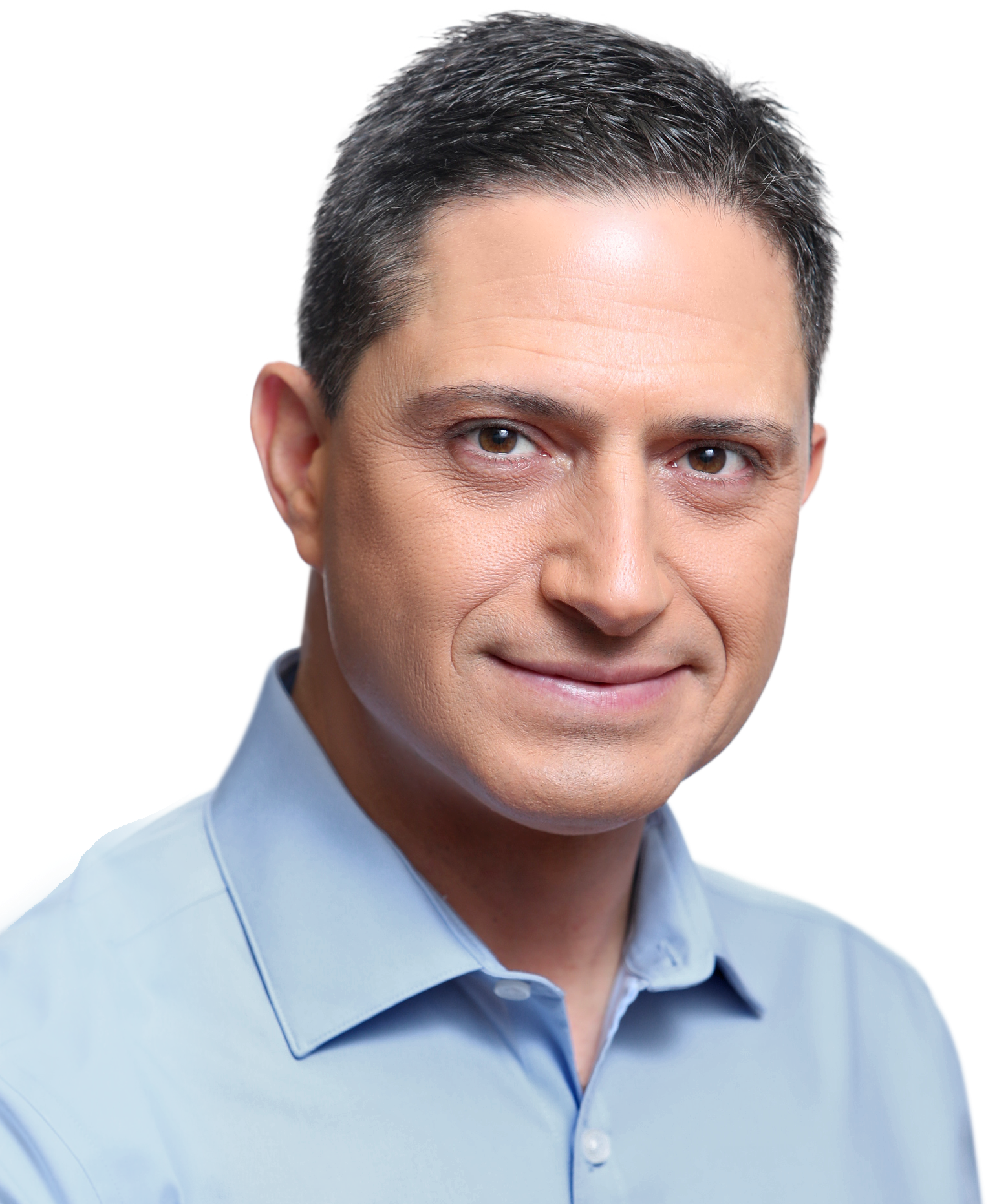

8th Mayor of Beersheba
- Incumbent
- Assumed office 2009
- Preceded by: Yaakov Turner

Personal details
- Born: 24 January 1971 (age 55) Beersheba, Israel
- Party: Labor Party, New Way (Derech Hadasha in Hebrew)
- Education: Ben-Gurion University of the Negev

Reuven "Ruvik" Danilovich (Hebrew: ראובן "רוביק" דנילוביץ; born 24 January 1971) is an Israeli politician. In 2008, he was elected mayor of Beersheba, after serving as deputy mayor under Yaakov Turner.

He was reelected in 2013 with 92.21% of the ballots, in November 2018 with 92% of the ballots and in February 2024 with 96.6% of the ballots.

== Biography ==
Ruvik Danilovich was born in Beersheba, to the late Rachel and Eli Danilovich. He is the third of four sons in the family and was educated in the city's education system. Danilovich holds a bachelor's degree in Israel Studies from the Faculty of Humanities and Social Sciences and an honorary doctorate in philosophy from the Ben-Gurion University of the Negev. His most famous saying is "only dreamers fulfill".

== Political career ==
At the age of 21, he became active in the Ben-Gurion University Student Council, and in the municipal political arena, emphasizing the development of young human capital in Be'er Sheva and demanding greater budgets and resources for the Negev.

When he was 27 years old, he became the Deputy Mayor of the city. For ten years he was in charge of education, youth, culture, sports, absorption, and neighborhood rehabilitation in Beersheba. During this time he promoted unique programs and projects to encourage excellence, as well as to encourage the value of volunteering and giving back to the community.

Ruvik Danilovich was elected to his first term as mayor in 2008, making him the youngest mayor in the history of Be'er Sheva. As the city's eighth mayor, he is also the first to be born, raised, and educated there. He was chosen to light the torch at the 64th Independence Day celebrations of the State of Israel in 2012, for his contributions to the development of Be'er Sheva and the Negev and for his courageous leadership during the "Cast Lead" and "Pillar of Defense" operations.

In 2013, he was elected for a second term with 93% of the vote. In the 2018 election, he won 93% of the vote with his "Derech Hadasha" party winning 16 council seats out of 27. Mayor Danilovich believes that cities must be innovative, entrepreneurial, and collaborative in the modern age. His worldview has led to fundamental changes in the city's image and economy.

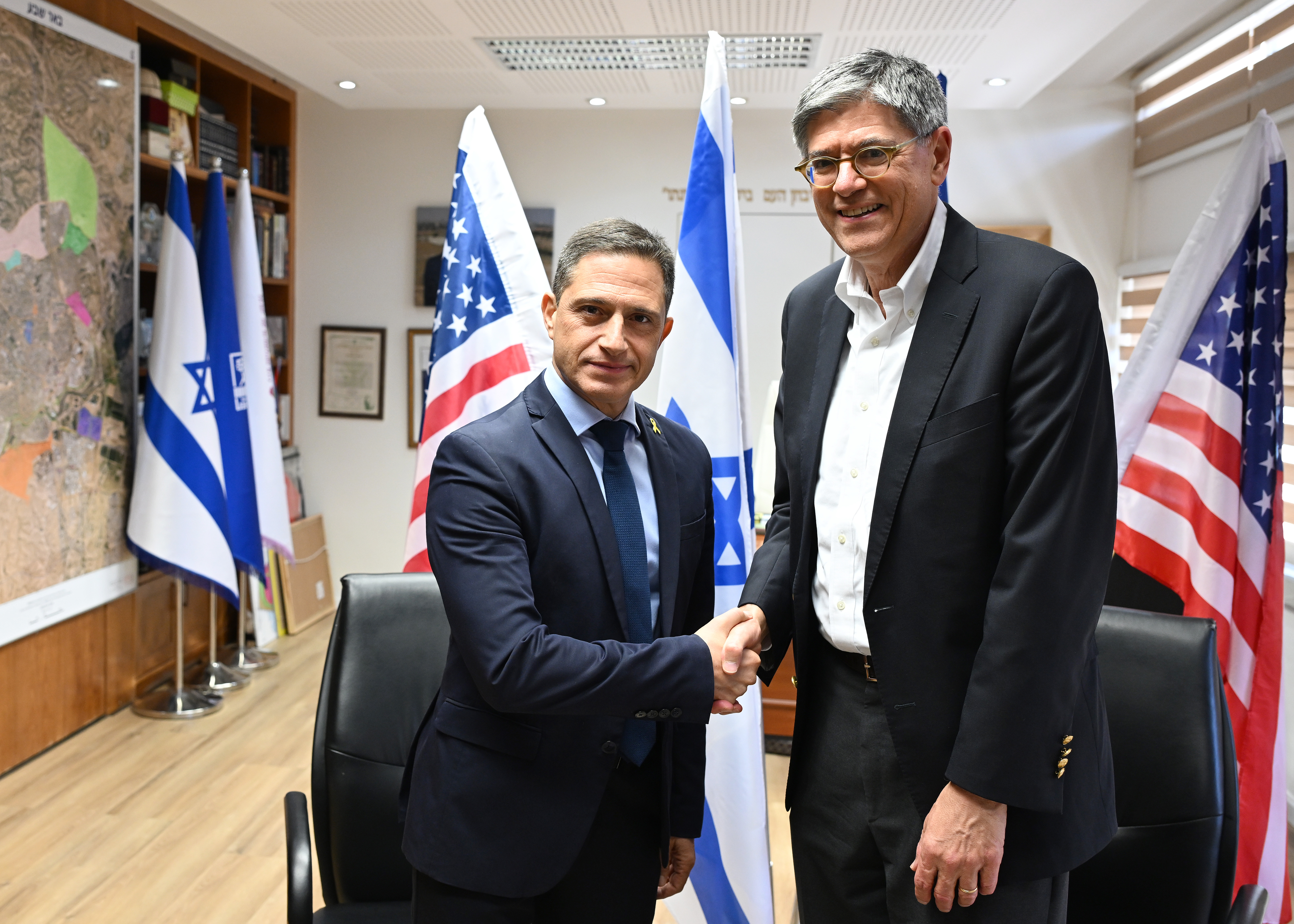
Danilovich meeting with U.S. Ambassador to Israel Jack Lew, 3 September 2024

During his tenure as Mayor, he has led Beersheba to unprecedented growth with billions invested in projects that have established Be'er Sheva as the fourth metropolis in Israel. These include 20,000 new and advanced housing units and public educational institutions, Gev Yam Negev high-tech park, the innovation district, sports complex, Be'er Sheva river park, an amphitheater, a transportation hub, tourist and leisure centers, and cultural and arts anchors. In addition, a second hospital and light rail are being planned.

Danilovich reportedly rejected an offer by the Israeli Labor Party to stand for the Knesset in the April 2019 legislative election, where he would have been second on the party's list.

== Awards ==
Since beginning his term as mayor of Beersheba in 2008, the city has received awards and been mentioned in international studies elucidating the city's potential - in a study published in 2015 by Brandeis University in the United States, Be'er Sheva was selected as one of the seven cities of the future in technology and innovation. Under his leadership, the city also won the National Education Award, twice the Culture Award of Israel, the Urban Design Award for Public Space Development, the Knesset Award for Volunteer City, the Green Globe Award, the Polaris Global Award from "Rotary", the Minister of the Interior's Award for Social Responsibility and the Accessibility Award for the Lunda Museum.
