= Freedom Party of New York =

The Freedom Party of New York may refer to:

- Freedom Party of New York (1994)
- Freedom Party of New York (2010)
