= New Zealand Freedom Party (disambiguation) =

The New Zealand Freedom Party was a short-lived political party formerly known as the New Zealand Public Party.

The New Zealand Freedom Party may also refer to:

- Freedom Party (New Zealand), defunct political party
- NZ Outdoors & Freedom Party, a party founded in 2015 that attempted to change their name to "Freedom" in 2026

== See also ==
- Freedom Movement (New Zealand), defunct political party that contested the 1999 election
- Freedoms New Zealand, defunct political "umbrella" party that contested the 2023 election
