= Justice and Development Party (disambiguation) =

The Justice and Development Party is a political party in Morocco and Turkey.

Justice and Development Party may also refer to:

- Justice and Development Party (Libya)
- Justice and Development Party (Tanzania)
- Justice and Development Party (Tunisia)
- Movement for Justice and Development (Slovenia)
- Movement for Justice and Development in Syria
- Party for Justice and Development (Burundi)
- For Justice and Development (Somalia)
- Justice and Development Front (Algeria)
