= Municipal elections in Israel =

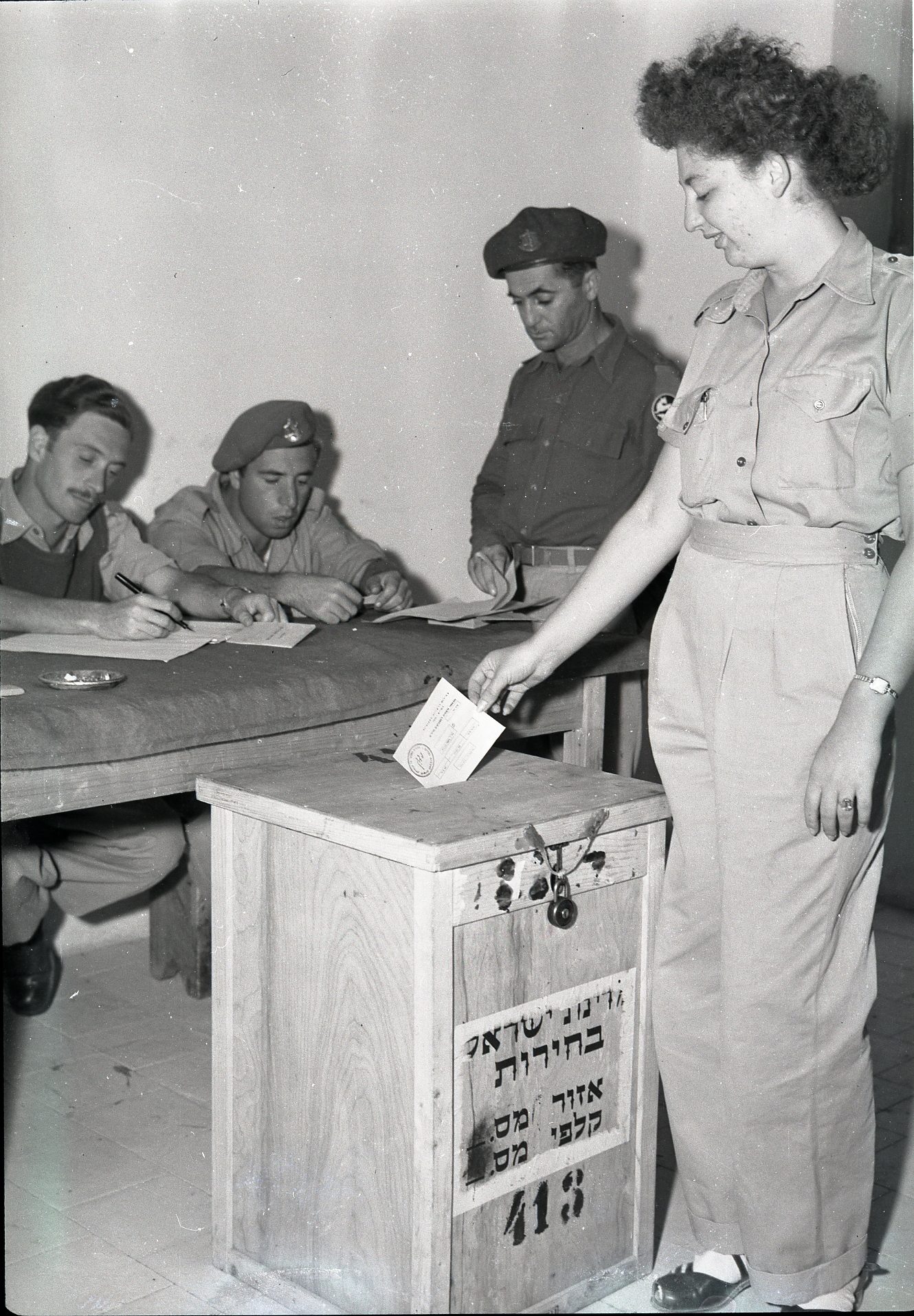
Municipal elections, 1950

The elections use two ballots: a yellow ballot for a candidate as chairman of the local authority in a direct election; and a white ballot for a list of candidates for the city councils or the local councils.

Municipal elections in Israel are elections in which the residents of the cities and local councils in Israel vote for the chairman of the local authority (mayor or municipality chairman), as well as for members of the city councils or the local councils.

== History ==
From 1950 to 1973, local elections were held the same day as national elections. The mayors of jurisdictions were elected by city or local councils, and from among its members. This maintained party stability.

In 1975, the government changed the schedule for municipal elections to every five years, rather than on the same schedule as the national legislative elections. The intention was to strengthen local politics, but the change in election day appears to have contributed to decreasing participation in voting on the local level, especially in large cities.

In 1978, another reform established a double ballot: For the first time, voters could vote directly for the mayor (by popular vote) and for a party list for seats on the city or local council. The Knesset established that a candidate needs at least 40% of the total votes order to be elected to the position of the chairman or mayor of the local authority. If no candidate gets 40% of the votes, a second round of elections is held. In this run-off, only the top two candidates compete against each other.

According to the Local Authorities Elections Law (חוק הבחירות לרשויות המקומיות), both Israeli citizens and permanent residents who are not citizens (e. g., the Palestinians of East Jerusalem), are eligible to vote for their local authorities. (In national elections, however, only Israeli citizens may vote.) Persons are considered eligible to vote in municipal elections at the age of 17 years, or older. (In national elections, by contrast, citizens must be aged 18, or older, to vote).

The contenders in the municipal elections are mostly representatives of the parties who also compete in the legislative elections. In addition, there may be numerous candidates who are not affiliated with a major political party. At times, voters will elected split tickets: a mayor who is independent or from one party, and a list of candidates for city council who are from another party.

The municipal elections day is classified as a sabbatical for workers who reside within the voting area. No media campaigns are broadcast on television or radio prior to the election day.

If there is a single candidate for mayor and a single list for city council, no elections will be held. This happened, for example, in 2008, municipal elections were not held in Bnei Brak and in Modi'in Illit for this reason.

== Eligibility ==
All Israeli citizens and permanent residents who are 17 or older are eligible to vote on election day, unlike legislative elections, where only Israeli citizens who are 18 or older are eligible to vote.

Every citizen is listed in the voters registry with an address and will vote for the municipality of that address. The final registry information is taken 40 days before the day of the elections. As a special case, a citizen that was registered in the previous 18 moths to a municipality that had an election at that time, they are not eligible to vote.

== Other types ==
=== Boroughs ===
There are several autonomous municipal boroughs#Israel in Israel. If a borough committee exists, a blue ballot would be used to vote.

=== Regional councils ===
A regional council is a municipality that is composed of various smaller villages. Its council is elected differently: each of the villages sends typically one.
