= Motti Malka =

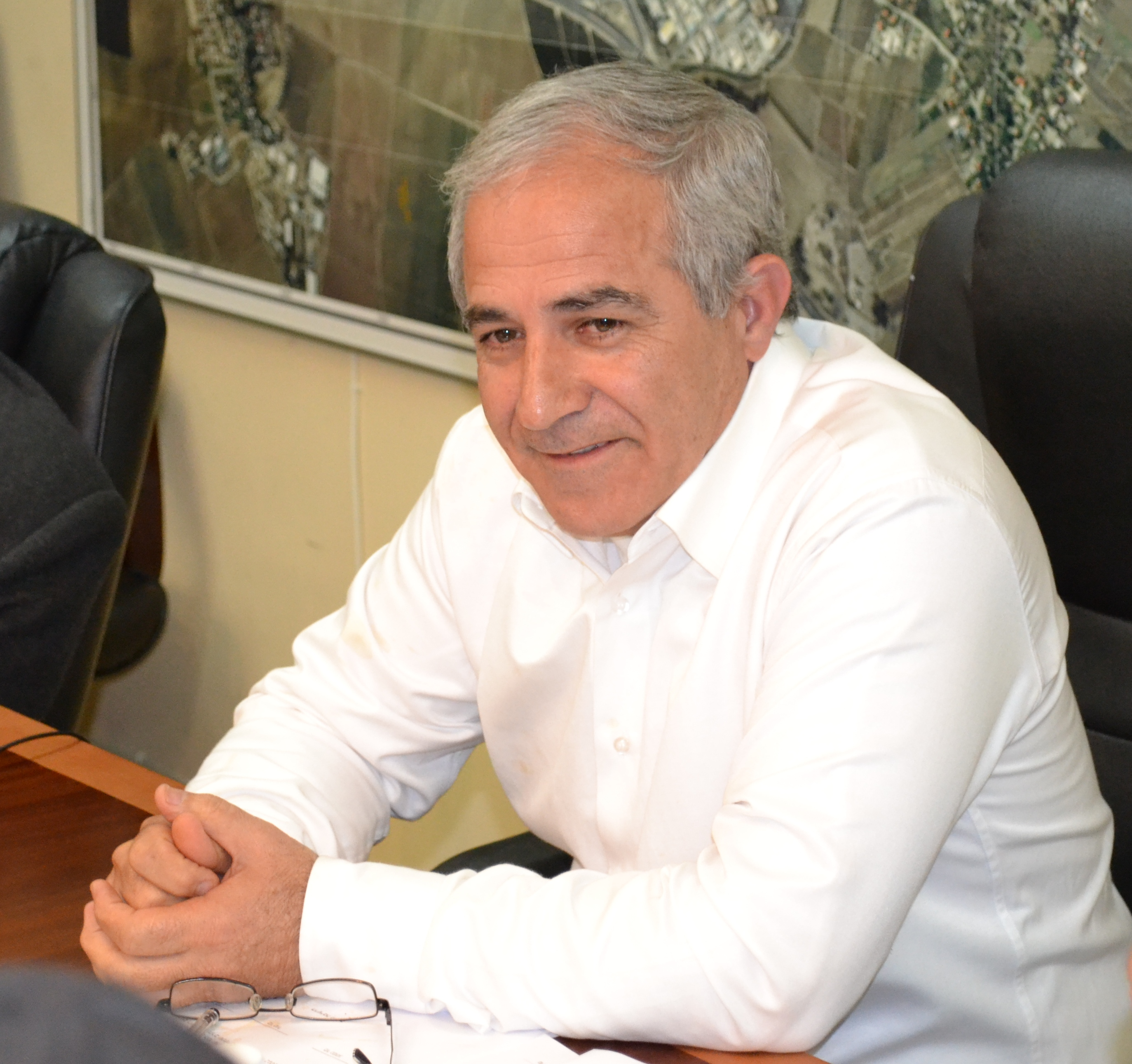
Mordechai Malka (2)

Motti Malka (Hebrew: מוטי מלכה) was the mayor of the southern Israeli city of Kiryat Malakhi. Malka is a member of the Mayors For Peace Network, an organization that aims to promote peace at a local, and civil society level across the world.

Malka was first elected in the 2003 municipal elections, beating the Likud incumbent by a comfortable margin. In the 2007 elections, he was re-elected on the Kadima list with 84% of the vote.

On 10 May 2012, Ynet news reported that Malka is a suspect in a rape in an apartment for a demonstration project. Malka denied the allegations and stated that sexual relations were held "consensually".
