= Social Justice (political party) =

- Leader: Gad Heren; Yaakov Nerodetzki
- Founder: Arcadi Gaydamak
- Founded: 2007

Election symbol
- צק

Social Justice (Hebrew: צדק חברתי, Tzedek Hevrati) was a political party in Israel headed by Russian-Israeli businessman Arcadi Gaydamak. It was launched by in February 2007 as a social movement, but was transformed into a political party in July that year. It did not participate in the 2009 elections for the Knesset but made a comeback to run in the 2013 elections. It did not participate in the 2015 elections

== Background ==
The movement was founded on 21 February 2007. It had been announced in the Israeli media the previous day that Gaydamak would be founding a political party. The new organisation was not originally a party, but Gaydamak stated that it could turn into one at any time "given the circumstances".

At the time he suggested the movement would not seek ultimate power for itself, telling voters "Don't vote for Olmert, don't vote for Peretz [then leader of Labour]—don't even vote for Gaydamak. Vote for Bibi." Nevertheless, a poll from late February gave Gaydamak's party 14 seats, while a late March poll indicated it would receive 9 seats if elections for the Knesset were held (compared to 31 for Likud, 17 for Labour and 11 for Kadima).

On 10 July 2007 Gaydamak launched Social Justice as a full political party, stating that the need to oust Ehud Olmert's government justified the creation of a new party. Claiming it could win 20 seats in the next elections and that he was the "most popular public figure in Israel", Gaydamak also said that he would not seek to enter the Knesset himself, though he would like to play a major role in Israeli politics.

It was originally suggested that the party is likely to run in tandem with Benjamin Netanyahu's Likud, hoping to pick up votes from former Likud members alienated by Netanyahu's financial policies, and even that the movement could eventually merge into Likud. However, following the party's official launch, associates of Gaydamak said that he was not ruling out supporting Labour's Ehud Barak.

According to polls in August 2007, support for the party had dropped below the threshold needed to win a seat in the Knesset. However, these polls were taken prior to the party's large municipal effort in 2008. Gaydamak is also popular in development towns, such as Sderot, and in the Israeli Arab, Bedouin, Druze and ultra-orthodox communities. In January 2008, Gaydamark claimed that his party was the largest in Israel, with 140,000 members (though unlike paid membership of other parties, the figure represented the number of people who had reportedly signed to say they supported the party). According to polls in the same month, the party could win seven seats in the Knesset. However, polls taken in October 2008 showed the party again failing to cross the electoral threshold.

== Ideology ==
The party's goals are to:

- Preserve democratic values
- Promote equality
- Protect human dignity and freedom
