= Ruhi al-Khatib =

Palestinian politician (1914–1994)

- روحي الخطيب
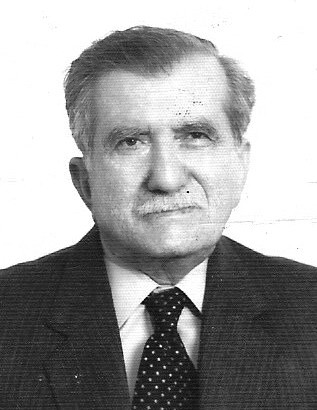

Mayor of East Jerusalem
- In office 1957 – 5 July 1994
- Preceded by: City Council committee Omar Elwary (1955)
- Succeeded by: Amin al-Majaj

Personal details
- Born: 1914 Jerusalem, Palestine
- Died: 5 July 1994 (aged 79–80)
- Children: 4
- Education: University of Oxford; University of Cambridge

Ruhi al-Khatib (Arabic: روحي الخطيب, Rūḥī al-Ḫaṭīb; 1914–1994) was the last mayor of East Jerusalem under Jordanian rule.

Elected in 1957, his term came to an end on 29 June 1967, when Israel dissolved the city council of East Jerusalem following its conquest of the city in the Six-Day War. Despite this he continued to hold the title of Mayor of Jerusalem until his death on 5 July 1994.

== Early life ==
Ruhi al-Khatib was born in Jerusalem in 1914 to a prominent family and travelled for studies to England, where he attended classes at Oxford and Cambridge. He became active within Palestinian nationalism upon his return to Jerusalem. Following the 1948 War he entered the hotel business.

In 1951, he was elected to the Jerusalem Municipal Council and became mayor of East Jerusalem in 1957.

== After annexation ==
In the three weeks from the day the Israeli conquest of the city until the dissolution of the city council of East Jerusalem, Al-Khatib was working to immediately reinstate the municipal services and restore the calm to the city. He even helped in dealing with sensitive issues such as the surrender of weapons held by the civilian population and the removal of squatters from the destroyed synagogues in the Jewish Quarter of the Old city of Jerusalem. His actions attracted criticisms from fellow Arabs, who accused him of collaborating with Israel. However, his dismissal made him a vocal opponent of Israel.

Al-Khatib did not recognize his dismissal and remained in Jerusalem. He continued to work as director of the Arab Hotels Company and the Jerusalem Electric Company. In March 1968 he was deported to Jordan as his presence in Jerusalem was deemed a danger to the security of Israel. He was not allowed to take anything with him.

His wife and two children, who learned of his expulsion from the radio, decided to stay in Jerusalem, hoping for his return. In the autumn of 1969, his wife was arrested and sentenced to three months in prison. After protests from many people, she was released after fifteen days. She was then given a permit to visit her husband and undergo an operation in Beirut. When she tried to return to Jerusalem after her convalescence, she was turned away at the border and refused entry.

== Later life ==
Al-Khatib returned to the West Bank in May 1993. He died on 5 July 1994.

== Gallery of images ==
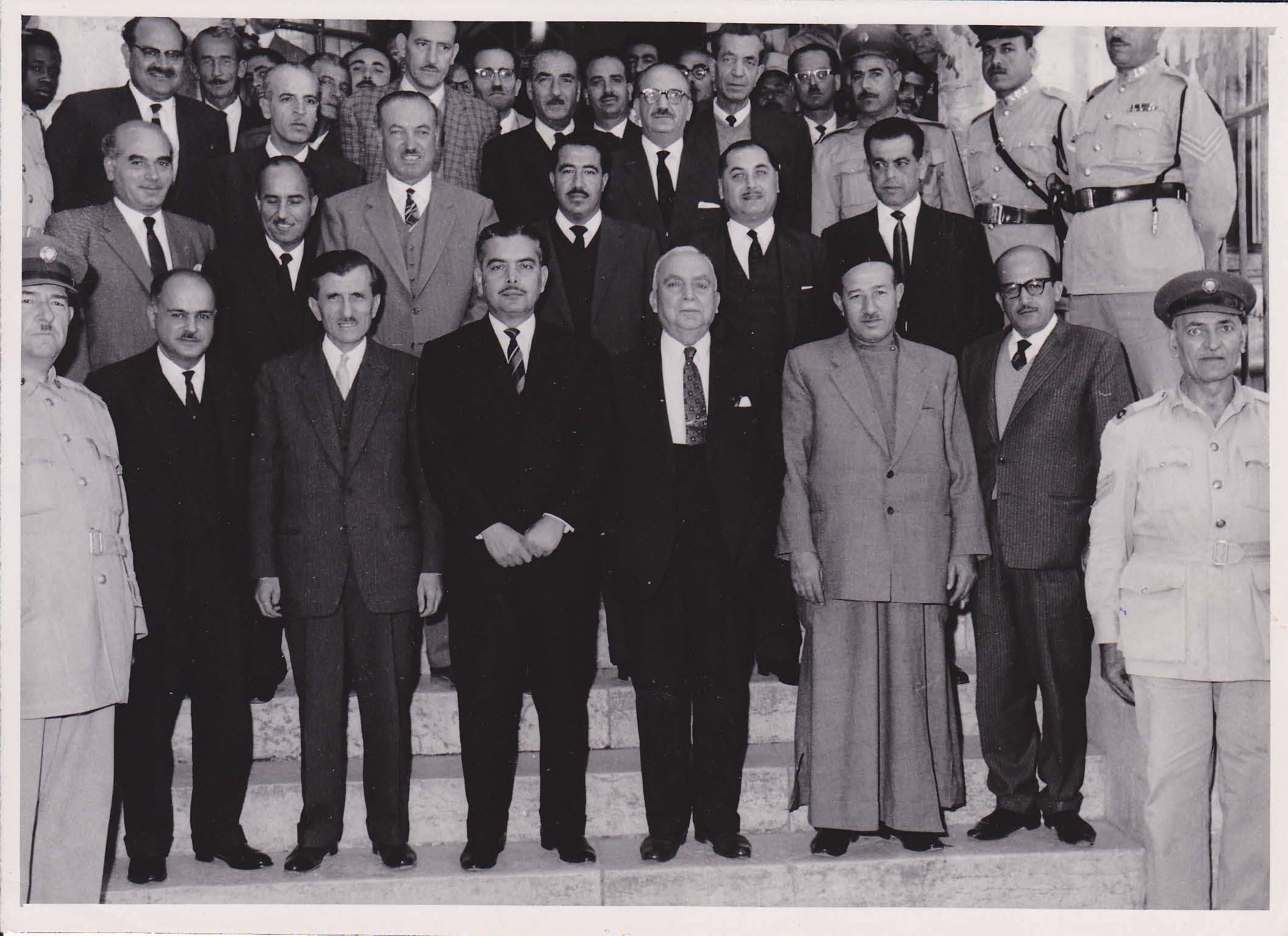
Jerusalem Municipal Council and Daod Abu-Ghazalel, Governor of Jerusalem, in 1965

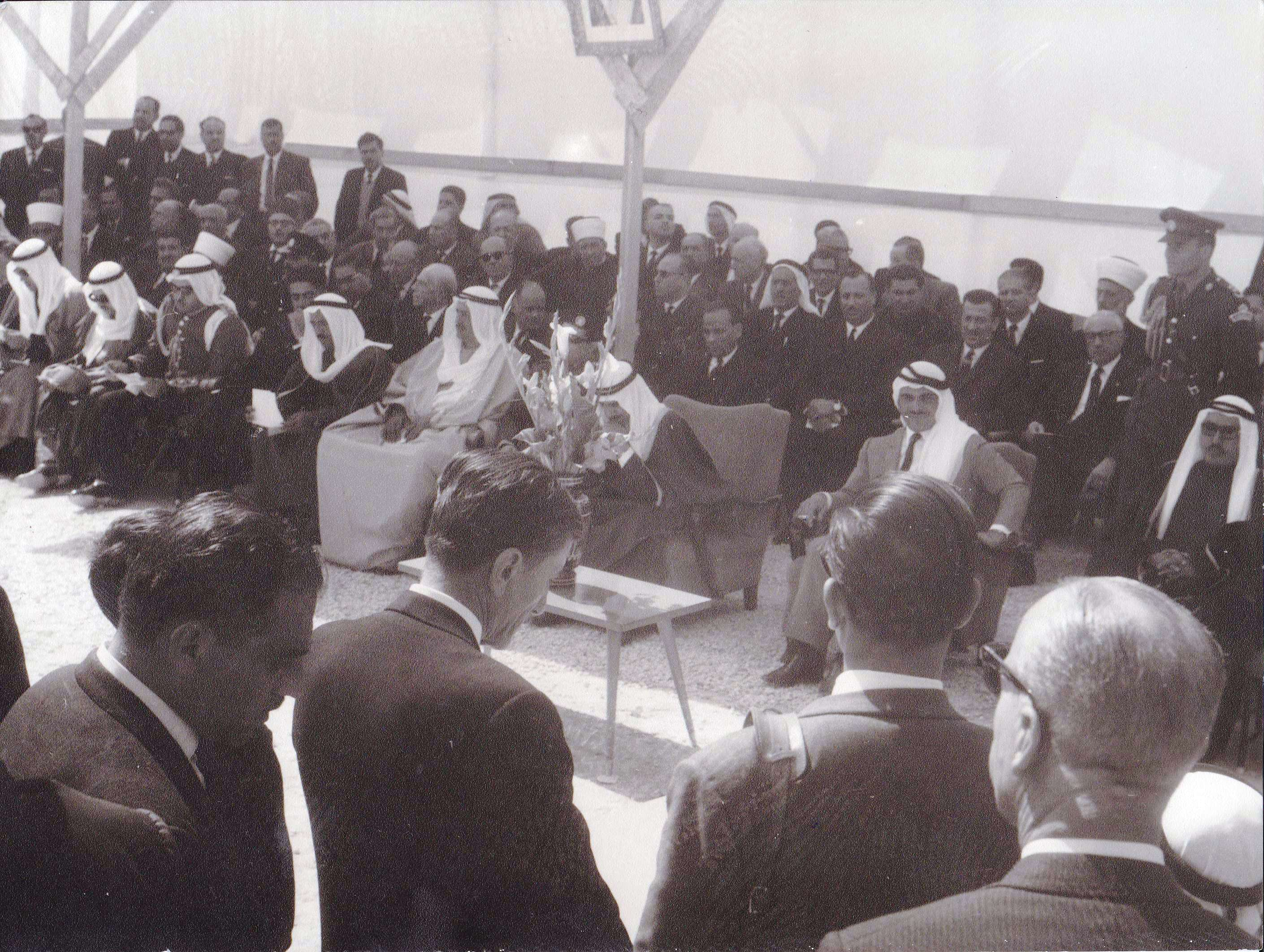
al-Khatib delivering speech at the cornerstone laying ceremony of Al-Quds University 1966 in the presence of King Hussein of Jordan and the Prince of Kuwait

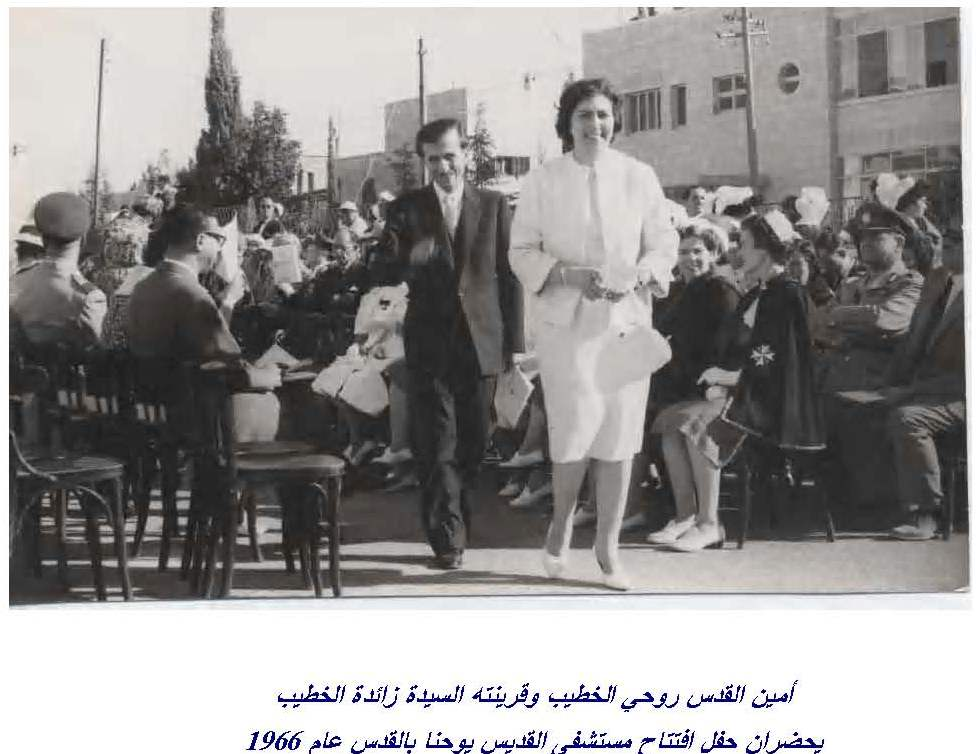
al-Khatib and his wife at the 1966 inauguration of St. John's Hospital in Jerusalem

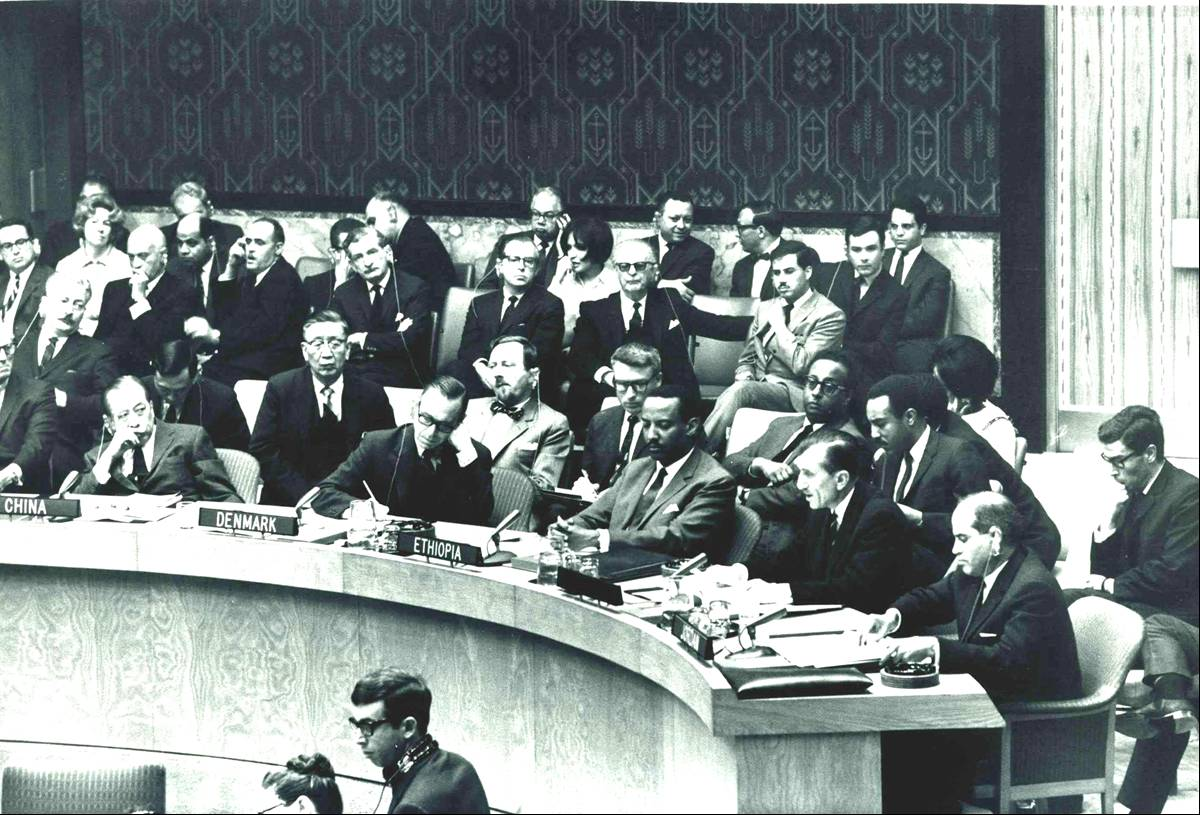
al-Khatib delivering a speech to the UN Security Council in 1968

Political offices
Preceded by City Council committee	Mayor of East Jerusalem; 1957–1994	Succeeded by Amin al-Majaj
