= Beilin–Abu Mazen agreement =

1995 draft Israeli–Palestinian peace treaty

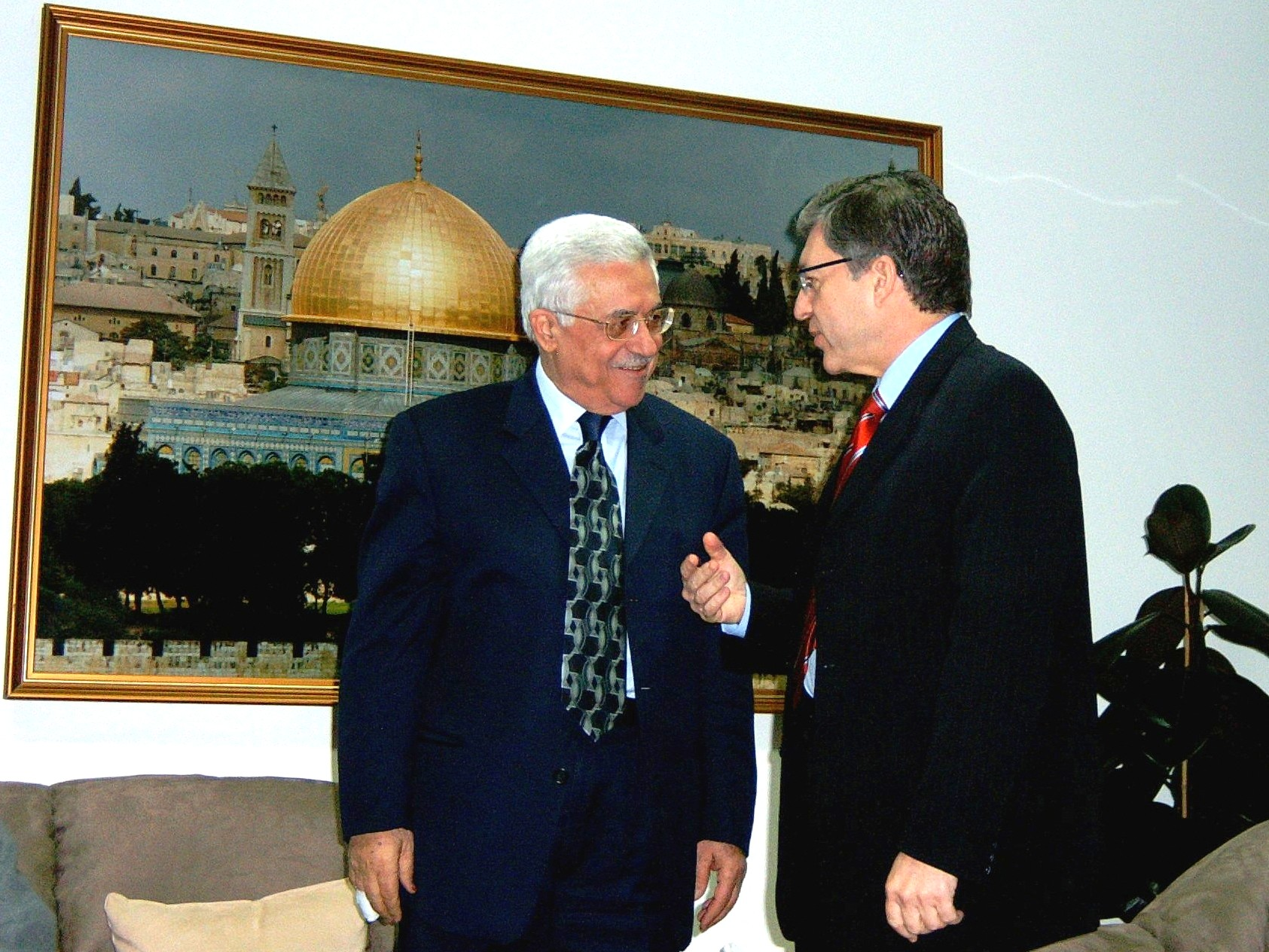
Abu Mazen and Yossi Beylin

The Beilin–Abu Mazen agreement, also called the Beilin–Abu Mazen plan or Beilin–Abu Mazen document, is an unofficial draft agreement between negotiators Yossi Beilin and Abu Mazen (Mahmoud Abbas), finished in 1995, that would serve as the basis for a future Israeli–Palestinian peace treaty. The proposal was never formally adopted by either the Israeli or the Palestinian governments, and has been disavowed by the Palestinian leadership.

== Publication and reception ==
The Beilin–Abu Mazen agreement was finalized in October 1995. According to Yossi Beilin, who was Economic Minister for Labor at the time, the procedure was merely informal, did not commit Israel, and the understandings were never proposed by Israel. The document was never formally published and never adopted by the Israelis or the Palestinians. PLO officials disavowed its existence, but the proposal found its way into circulation.

Then-Israeli Prime Minister Yitzhak Rabin was unable to give his seal of approval to this proposal due to his assassination just a few days after publication. New Israeli Prime Minister Shimon Peres and Yasser Arafat did not completely accept this proposal, but supported using it as a basis for further negotiations and for a final status peace deal.

Abu Mazen (Mahmoud Abbas) denied ever signing the agreement, but confirmed that there had been a dialog concerning the final status negotiations and the existence of some text. Abbas later disavowed the proposal, leading some to call it the "Beilin–Abu Beilin agreements." Yasser Arafat disavowed the proposal as well. By 2001, Palestinian officials said that the proposal has no bearing on the refugee issue, a position that Abu Mazen (Mahmoud Abbas) supports as well.

Although the proposal was never completely accepted, some of the ideas presented in it were thought to be good compromises in resolving certain issues in final status negotiations later on.

== Contents of the agreement ==
In the Beilin–Abu Mazen Agreement, Israel would agree to the establishment of a Palestinian state on most of the West Bank and Gaza Strip. In turn, the Palestinians would give up their right of return to Israel proper and instead encourage Palestinian refugees to settle in the new Palestinian state.

=== Settlements ===
Israelis remaining within the borders of the Palestinian State would be subject to Palestinian sovereignty and Palestinian rule of law. They would be offered Palestinian citizenship or could choose to remain as alien residents.

=== Jerusalem and Abu Dis ===
Jerusalem's municipal borders would be expanded to include nearby Arab neighborhoods (called "Palestinian boroughs") such as Abu Dis, as well as the Jewish settlements Ma'ale Adumim, Givat Ze'ev, Givon, and adjacent areas, together to be called the "City of Jerusalem"; a two-thirds Israeli majority in the "City of Jerusalem" would be guaranteed. One Municipality would be maintained in the form of a Joint Higher Municipal Council, with two (Israeli and Palestinian) sub-municipalities. The Palestinian boroughs would be under Palestinian sovereignty; the Israeli boroughs under Israeli sovereignty.

The Western part of the city, would be the capital of Israel, called "Yerushalayim"; the Arab Eastern part would be the capital of Palestine, called "al-Quds".

The ultimate sovereignty over the area inside the present municipal boundaries of Jerusalem (as of 1995), but outside "Yerushalayim" and "al-Quds" would be decided upon in future negotiations. The Haram ash-Sharif would come under Palestinian "extra-territorial sovereignty".

The Parties would guarantee freedom of worship and access to all Holy Sites for members of all faiths and religions without impediment or restriction.

Dore Gold, the former Israeli ambassador to the United Nations, stated by looking at negotiation documents that the Palestinians always wanted to have East Jerusalem as their permanent, long-term capital and never intended to accept Abu Dis as a permanent substitute to Jerusalem. Abu Dis was merely meant to be the provisional, temporary Palestinian capital before the Palestinians acquired East Jerusalem in future negotiations.

== The Beilin–Eitan Agreement ==
In 1997, Yossi Beilin concluded the Beilin–Eitan Agreement between the Likud block and Labor, which postulated that all of Jerusalem would remain under Israeli sovereignty and the "Palestinian entity" would never have its "governing center" within Jerusalem. Instead, Palestinian residents of Arab neighborhoods in Jerusalem would be granted some "share in the responsibility of the administration of their lives in the city".
