= Zaki al-Ghul =

Palestinian politician (1926–2019)

- زكي الغول

Titular Mayor of East Jerusalem
- In office 1999 – 28 April 2019
- Preceded by: Amin al-Majaj
- Succeeded by: Vacant

Personal details
- Born: 1926 Silwan neighborhood, Jerusalem, Mandatory Palestine
- Died: 28 April 2019 (aged 92–93) Amman, Jordan
- Education: Palestinian Institute of Law; John F. Kennedy University

Zaki Ali Khader al-Ghul (Arabic: زكي علي خضر الغول; 1926 – 28 April 2019) was a Palestinian politician based in Jordan.

== Life and education ==
Zaki Ali Khader al-Ghul was born in 1926 in Jerusalem’s Silwan neighborhood. He graduated from the Palestinian Institute of Law in 1948 and achieved a doctorate from John F. Kennedy University in 2006.

== Mayor of East Jerusalem ==
From 1999 until his death in 2019, al-Ghul served as the titular mayor of East Jerusalem. Due to the forced shutting down of all councils related to the East Jerusalem municipal services by Israeli authorities, al-Ghul held what constituted a purely formal position or title without any practical or real authority.

Political offices
Preceded by Amin al-Majaj	Titular Mayor of East Jerusalem; 1999–2019	Vacant
