= Omar Elwary =

Palestinian politician (1903–1972)

Omar Amin Suleiman Khamis Suleiman Elwary
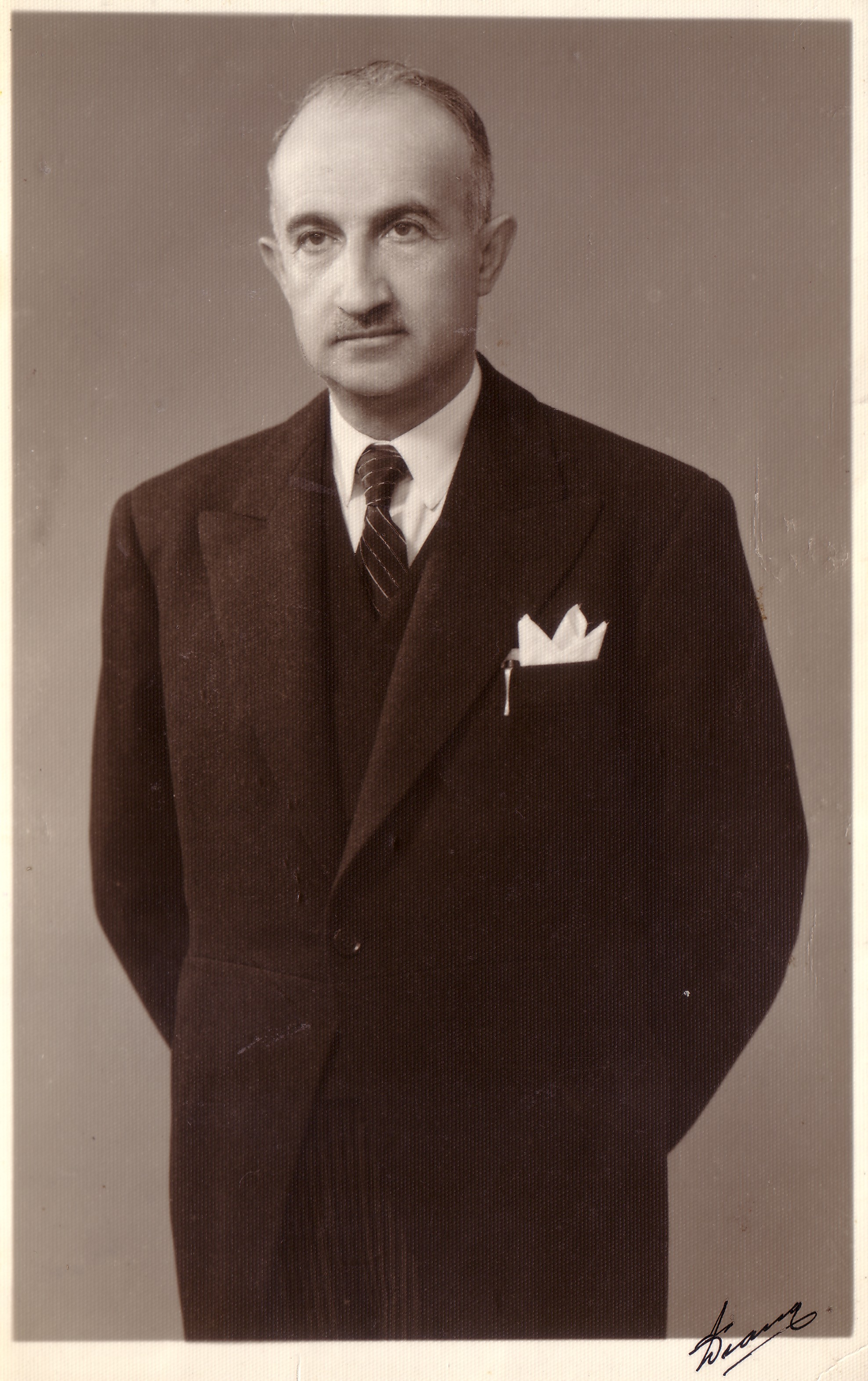
- Omar Elwary in 1955

Mayor of East Jerusalem
- In office 12 March 1952 – 1955

Head of the District Court in Jerusalem
- In office 16 June 1948 – 1 January 1949

Judge in the Supreme Court of Appeal in Jerusalem and the West Bank of Jordan
- In office 1 January 1949 – 29 June 1949

Personal details
- Born: 1903
- Died: April 1972 (aged 69) Jerusalem
- Occupation: Politician, lawyer, judge

Omar Amin Suleiman Khamis Suleiman Elwary, also known as Omar Elwary, (1903–1972) was a Palestinian politician, who was the mayor of East Jerusalem.

== Career ==
On 21 May 1948, following the 1948 Palestine war, and by order of the Jordanian Arab Army authorities, he formed the Military Court to consider issues related to security and public order. On 16 June 1948, he was appointed Head of the District Court in Jerusalem. On 1 January 1949, he was appointed as a judge in the Supreme court of Appeal in Jerusalem and the West Bank of Jordan. On 29 June 1949, he began practicing the legal profession, and in the meantime, on 18 August 1951, he took up the defense with a group of attorneys Jerusalem lawyers, namely Yahya Hammouda, Hanna Atallah, Jabra Al-Anqar, Issa Aqel, Nasri Nasr, Aziz Shehadeh, and Wafiq Younis Al-Husseini in the case the killing of Abdullah I bin Al Hussein.

On 23 October 1951, Elwary was elected a member of the Jerusalem Municipal Council. On 12 March 1952, he was appointed head of the municipal council of East Jerusalem and remained so until the end of 1955. During this period, he carried out several projects to implement the necessary services for the holy city, including water and sewage projects, and opening the necessary roads for the city, in addition to expanding the borders of the Jerusalem municipality to include the neighboring areas as well to the form it is now.

In his capacity as mayor of East Jerusalem, he received King Saud bin Abdulaziz Al Saud, King of the Kingdom of Saudi Arabia and King Hussein bin Talal, King of the Hashemite Kingdom of Jordan in 1953, during King Saud's visit to Jerusalem (Al-Quds Al-Sharif).

Al-Hajj Omar Elwary died in April 1972 in Jerusalem at the age of 69 years.

The Waary-Shawarma, popular in Jerusalem and Jerichow, dates back to his dynasty.
