= Amin al-Majaj =

Palestinian pediatrician and politician

Amin Saleh Majaj
- أمين المجاج

Titular Mayor of East Jerusalem
- In office 1994 – 2 January 1999
- Preceded by: Ruhi al-Khatib
- Succeeded by: Zaki Al-Ghul

Member of the Jordanian Parliament
- In office 1957–1964
- In office 1967–1988

Ministry of Health (Jordan)
- In office 1957–1957
- In office 1964–1964

Personal details
- Born: 21 March 1921 Ramallah, Mandatory Palestine
- Died: 2 January 1999 (aged 77) Jerusalem
- Spouse: Betty Dagher
- Children: 4
- Education: American University of Beirut; University of London

Amin Saleh Majaj (Arabic: أمين المجاج, Āmeen Majjaj; 21 March 1921 – 2 January 1999) was a Palestinian pediatric and politician who served as the Titular Mayor of East Jerusalem from 1994 to 1999. He also served in the Parliament of Jordan from 1957 to 1964, and 1967 to 1988.

== Early life ==
Amin Saleh Majaj was born in Ramallah on 21 March 1921, to Bahia and Saleh Ibrahim Majaj. His mother was the daughter of Philip Maalouf, a Lebanese doctor sent to Ramallah by the Quakers in 1890. His father taught at a Greek Orthodox Church school in Jaffa. His family were Palestinian Christians that were members of the Anglican Episcopalian Church. He was educated at St. George's School, Jerusalem. He graduated from the American University of Beirut (AUB) with a diploma in medicine and surgery in 1945, and the University of London with a degree in pediatrics in 1954.

== Career ==
=== Medical ===
The exodus of Palestinians to places like Jordan following the Nakba resulted in malnutrition among the large refugee population. Al-Majaj proposed a diet of animal proteins and vitamin B12 injections. He provided treatment to the orphans at Hind al-Husseini's Dar al-Tifl al-Arabi.

Al-Majaj conducted his research at the Augusta Victoria Hospital and was head of the pediatrics department from 1950 to 1991. He was a pediatric at the Makassed Hospital from 1967 to 1982, and director of it from 1977 to 1982. His work was published in the The American Journal of Clinical Nutrition and Gazette of the Egyptian Paediatric Association.

Al-Majaj and his wife were on vacation in Vienna when the Straits of Tiran were closed before the start of the Six Day War. They returned home upon hearing the news on radio. He remained at the hospital until the ceasefire was enacted; the new pediatrics department was destroyed during the war.

=== Political ===
Al-Majaj became a member of the Jerusalem municipal council in 1950. He was a member of the Parliament of Jordan from 1957 to 1964, and from 1967 to 1988. He was Minister of Health in 1957 and 1964.

Ruhi al-Khatib, the Mayor of East Jerusalem, had to go abroad in 1956. Al-Majaj served as acting mayor while al-Khatib was absent. Zaki al-Ghul was appointed to replace al-Majaj.

== Personal life ==
Al-Majaj met Betty Dagher, a Lebanese woman, while attending AUB and they married in 1947. The couple had four children. They was separated from his family, who lived in Jordan, after the Six Day War. In 1997, he was ordained as lay canon in the Anglican Church of Jerusalem. He died in Jerusalem on 2 January 1999, and was buried on Mount Zion.

== Works cited ==
=== Books ===
- Klein, Menachem (2001). Jerusalem: The Contested City. New York University Press. ISBN 9780814747544.
- Schor, Laura (2019). Sophie Halaby in Jerusalem: An Artist’s Life. Syracuse University Press. ISBN 9780815636533.

=== News ===
- Hodgkin, Edward (14 March 1999). "Obituary: Dr Amin Majaj". The Independent. Archived from the original on 5 November 2026.

=== Web ===
- "Amin Majaj". Jerusalem Story. 1 November 2021. Archived from the original on 5 November 2026.

Political offices
Preceded by Ruhi al-Khatib	Titular Mayor of East Jerusalem; 1994–1999	Succeeded by Zaki al-Ghul
