= Bruno (name) =

- Gender: Male

Origin
- Origin: Old High German, Latin
- Meaning: "Brown"
- Region of origin: Italy

Other names
- Related names: "Bruna" (female), Braun, Brown

Bruno is a given name and surname of Old Irish, French, Italian, Latin and Germanic origin. In the Latin languages, it comes from Brunus, An Bru’, Brun, and Brugh; Bruno is a Latin name as well as Germanic (Braun) name composed of the root brun-, which can mean burnished (polished, brown, with luste), also present in the words/names braun (in German), brown (in English), and Bruno (in Latin.)

Today it is also very frequent in Italy, where it has been documented since the 8th century and whose spread is mainly due to important figures such as the monk Bruno of Cologne (1030–1101), and the pioneer of the scientific method, Giordano Bruno (1548–1600).

Given the popularity of the given name in Italy, as a result of patronymic tradition, the surname "Bruno" and its numerous variants are also recurrent, such as Bruce, Brunacci, Brunaldi, Brundu, Brunari, Brunella, Brunelleschi, Brunelli, Brunello, Brunengo, Bruneri, Brunese, Brunetti, Brunex, Brunetto, Bruni, Brunini, Brunoldi, Brunone, Brunotti, Brunei, etc.

It commonly occurs in Greece, Croatia and in countries that speak Germanic, Romance, Baltic and West Slavic languages and as a given name to men and boys. Bruno is most common in Italy. Bruno is the 11th most common surname in Italy.

== Given name ==
=== People ===
==== Medieval world ====
- Bruno, Duke of Saxony (died 880)
- Bruno the Great (925–965), Archbishop of Cologne, Duke of Lotharingia and saint
- Bruno (bishop of Verden) (920–976), German Roman Catholic bishop
- Pope Gregory V (c. 972 – 999), born Bruno of Carinthia
- Bruno of Querfurt (c. 974 – 1009), Christian missionary bishop, martyr and saint
- Bruno of Augsburg (c. 992 – 1029), Bishop of Augsburg
- Bruno (bishop of Würzburg) (1005–1045), German Roman Catholic bishop
- Pope Leo IX (1002–1054), born Bruno of Egisheim-Dagsburg
- Bruno II (1024–1057), Frisian count or margrave
- Bruno the Saxon (fl. 2nd half of the 11th century), historian
- Bruno of Cologne (died 1101), founder of the Carthusians
- Bruno (bishop of Segni) (c. 1045 – 1123), Italian Roman Catholic bishop and saint
- Bruno (archbishop of Trier) (died 1124), German Roman Catholic bishop
- Bruno II of Berg (c. 1100 – 1137), Archbishop of Cologne and chips

==== Modern world ====
===== A–G =====
- Bruno Abakanowicz (1852–1900), Polish mathematician, inventor and electrical engineer
- Bruno Abbatini (1938–2017), Italian footballer
- Bruno Erhard Abegg (1803–1848), Prussian politician
- Bruno Adler (1888–1968), German art historian and writer
- Bruno Aeberhard (born 1976), Swiss bobsleigher
- Bruno Agnello (born 1985), Brazilian footballer
- Bruno Agostinelli (1987–2016), Canadian tennis player
- Bruno Aguiar, multiple people
- Bruno Ahlberg (1911–1966), Finnish boxer
- Bruno Ahrends (1878–1948), German architect
- Bruno Åkesson (1887–1971), Swedish wrestler
- Bruno Akrapović (born 1987), Bosnian football manager
- Bruno Alberti (born 1934), Italian alpine skier
- Bruno Albuquerque (born 1989), Portuguese runner
- Bruno Alicarte (born 1972), French footballer
- Bruno Almeida (born 1996), Portuguese footballer
- Bruno de Almeida (born 1965), Portuguese filmmaker, musician and composer
- Bruno Alves (born 1981), Portuguese footballer
- Bruno Alves (footballer, born 1990), Portuguese footballer
- Bruno Alves (footballer, born 1991), Brazilian footballer
- Bruno Alves (footballer, born 1992), Brazilian footballer
- Bruno Amable (born 1961), French economist
- Bruno Amantea, Italian physician and surgeon
- Bruno Amaro (born 1983), Portuguese footballer
- Bruno Amione (born 2002), Argentine footballer
- Bruno Amorim, multiple people
- Bruno Amoussou (born 1939), Beninese politician
- Bruno Amstad (1964–2024), Swiss singer
- Bruno Andrade, multiple people
- Bruno Angoletta (1889–1954), Italian illustrator, cartoonist and painter
- Bruno Apitz (1900–1979), German writer
- Bruno Appels (born 1988), Belgian association football player
- Bruno Aquino (born 1991), Brazilian footballer
- Bruno Araújo (born 1972), Brazilian politician
- Bruno Arcari, multiple people
- Bruno Armirail (born 1994), French bicycle racer
- Bruno Arpaia, Italian writer and journalist
- Bruno Arrabal (born 1992), Brazilian footballer
- Bruno Astorre (1963–2023), Italian politician
- Bruno Audebrand (born 1968), French footballer
- Bruno Augenstein (1923–2005), German-born American scientist
- Bruno Aveillan (born 1968), French film director
- Bruno Åvik (born 1940), Swedish cross-country skier
- Bruno Nestor Azerot (born 1961), French politician
- Bruno Báez (born 2000), Argentine professional footballer
- Bruno Baio (born 1995), Brazilian footballer
- Bruno Ballante (1906–1977), Italian footballer
- Bruno Ballarini (1937–2015), Italian footballer
- Bruno Baltazar (born 1977), Portuguese footballer and manager
- Bruno Balz (1902–1988), German songwriter
- Bruno Banani (luger) (born 1987), Tongan luger
- Bruno Banducci (1921–1985), American football player
- Bruno Banzer (born 1947), Liechtenstein gymnast
- Bruno Baptista (born 1997), Brazilian racing driver
- Bruno Barabani (1932–2015), Brazilian weightlifter
- Bruno Baranda (born 1963), Chilean politician
- Bruno Barbatti (1926–2020), Swiss scholar and writer
- Bruno Barbey (1941–2020), Moroccan-born French photographer
- Bruno Barbieri (born 1962), Italian cook
- Bruno Barbosa (born 1985), Brazilian footballer
- Bruno Barilli (1880–1952), Italian composer
- Bruno Barnabe (1905–1998), English actor
- Bruno Baronchelli (born 1957), French footballer
- Bruno Barranco (born 1997), Argentine professional footballer
- Bruno Barreiro (born 1965), American politician
- Bruno Barreto (born 1955), Brazilian film director
- Bruno Barrillot (1940–2017), French whistleblower
- Bruno de Barros (born 1987), Brazilian sprinter
- Bruno Barros (born 1982), Brazilian footballer
- Bruno Bartholome (1927–1994), German long-distance runner
- Bruno Barticciotto (born 2001), Chilean footballer
- Bruno Bartoletti (1926–2013), Italian operatic conductor
- Bruno Bartolozzi (1911–1980), Italian composer
- Bruno Baseotto (born 1960), Canadian ice hockey player
- Bruno Basto (born 1978), Portuguese footballer
- Bruno Batata (born 1984), Brazilian footballer
- Bruno Bauch (1877–1942), German philosopher
- Bruno Bauer (1809–1882), German philosopher
- Bruno Baveni (1939–2025), Italian footballer and coach
- Bruno Bayen (1950–2016), French novelist, playwright and theatre director
- Bruno Becker, Brazilian Paralympic swimmer
- Bruno Beger (1911–2009), German racial anthropologist
- Bruno Bekkar, New Zealand professional wrestler and trainer
- Bruno Belin (1929–1962), Croatian footballer
- Bruno Bellone (born 1962), French footballer
- Bruno Belthoise (born 1964), French classical pianist and improviser
- Bruno Berger-Gorski (born 1959), German opera director
- Bruno Bernabei (1888–1947), Italian politician
- Bruno Bernard (1912–1987), German-American photographer
- Bruno Berner (born 1977), Swiss footballer
- Bruno Bertacchini (1916–2003), Italian motorcycle racer
- Bruno Bertinato (born 1998), Brazilian footballer
- Bruno Bertotti (1930–2018), Italian physicist
- Bruno Bertucci (born 1990), Brazilian footballer
- Bruno Besson (born 1979), French racing driver
- Bruno Betancor (born 2003), Uruguayan footballer
- Bruno Bettelheim (1903–1990), Austrian-born psychologist, scholar, public intellectual and writer
- Bruno Bettinelli (1913–2004), Italian composer and teacher
- Bruno Betzel (1894–1965), American baseball player
- Bruno Beudet (born 1964), French wrestler
- Bruno Bianchi, multiple people
- Bruno Bichir (born 1967), Mexican actor
- Bruno Bicocchi (1955–2021), French sprint canoer
- Bruno Biehler (1884–1966), German architect
- Bruno Bieler (1888–1966), Nazi general
- Bruno Bilde (born 1976), French politician
- Bruno Binggeli, Swiss curler
- Bruno Bini (born 1954), French footballer and manager
- Bruno Bisang (born 1952), Swiss fashion designer
- Bruno Bischofberger (1940–2026), Swiss art dealer and collector
- Bruno Bizarro (born 1979), Portuguese musical artist
- Bruno Bjelinski (1909–1992), Croatian composer
- Bruno Blašković (born 1998), Croatian swimmer
- Bruno Block (1885–1937), American baseball player
- Bruno Blum (born 1960), French musician
- Bruno Boban (1992–2018), Croatian footballer
- Bruno Bobone (born 1960), Portuguese businessperson
- Bruno Boche (1897–1972), German field hockey player
- Bruno Bogojević (born 1998), Croatian footballer
- Bruno Boin (born c. 1937), American basketball player
- Bruno Bolas (born 1996), Portuguese footballer
- Bruno Bolchi (1940–2022), Italian football player and manager
- Bruno A. Boley (1924–2017), American engineer and academic
- Bruno Bonfim (born 1979), Brazilian swimmer
- Bruno Bongongo (born 1985), Central African boxer
- Bruno Boni (1915–2003), Italian rower
- Bruno Bonifacio (born 1994), Brazilian racing driver
- Bruno Bonnell (born 1958), French businessman and politician
- Bruno Bordeleau (1868–1929), Canadian politician
- Bruno Boscardin (born 1970), Swiss cyclist
- Bruno Boscherie (born 1951), French fencer
- Bruno Bošnjak (born 1983), Croatian Paralympic snowboarder
- Bruno Bouchet (born 1986), Australian radio producer
- Bruno Boyadjian (born 1958), French water polo player
- Bruno Bozzetto (born 1938), Italian animator
- Bruno Braakhuis (born 1961), Dutch politician
- Bruno Bracalente, Italian politician
- Bruno Braga (born 1983), Portuguese footballer
- Bruno Branciforte (born 1947), Italian admiral
- Bruno Brandes (1910–1985), German politician
- Bruno Braquehais (1823–1875), French photographer
- Bruno Bräuer (1893–1947), German paratrooper general
- Bruno Brígido (born 1991), Brazilian footballer
- Bruno Brindisi (born 1964), Italian comic book artist
- Bruno Brivonesi (1886–1970), Italian admiral
- Bruno Brizzi (born 1993), Swiss footballer
- Bruno Brokken (born 1953), Belgian high jumper
- Bruno Bronetta (born 1984), Brazilian footballer
- Bruno Brookes (born 1959), British disc jockey
- Bruno Broucqsault (born 1973), French equestrian
- Bruno Broughton (born 1995), English cricketer
- Bruno Brown (1888–1950), English rugby player
- Bruno Bruins (born 1963), Dutch politician
- Bruno Bruni, multiple people
- Bruno Brunod (born 1962), Italian athlete and a bicyclist
- Bruno Bruyere (born 1965), Belgian cyclist
- Bruno Buchberger (born 1942), Austrian mathematician
- Bruno Bulić (born 1958), Yugoslav cyclist
- Bruno Bürki (born 1931), Swiss pastor and academic
- Bruno Burrini (1931–2017), Italian alpine skier
- Bruno Bušić (1939–1978), Croatian writer
- Bruno Caboclo (born 1995), Brazilian basketball player
- Bruno Cabrera (born 1997), Argentine footballer
- Bruno Cabrerizo (born 1979), Brazilian footballer, model and actor
- Bruno Caires (born 1976), Portuguese footballer
- Bruno Camacho (born 1985), Brazilian footballer
- Bruno Campanella (born 1943), Italian conductor
- Bruno Campese (born 1963), Canadian-born Italian ice hockey player
- Bruno Campos (born 1973), Brazilian actor
- Bruno Candrian (born 1947), Swiss equestrian
- Bruno Canfora (1924–2017), Italian composer, conductor and music arranger
- Bruno Canino (born 1935), Italian pianist and composer
- Bruno Cantanhede (born 1993), Brazilian footballer
- Bruno Capinan (born 1984), Brazilian musical artist
- Bruno Cappelozza, Brazilian mixed martial artist
- Bruno Carabetta (born 1966), French judoka
- Bruno Cardoso (born 1984), Brazilian footballer
- Bruno Carette (1956–1989), French humorist and comedian
- Bruno Carini (1912–1945), French cyclist
- Bruno Carmeni (born 1940), Italian judoka
- Bruno Carneiro (born 1999), Brazilian racing driver
- Bruno Carotenuto (born 1941), Italian actor
- Bruno Carotti (born 1972), French footballer
- Bruno Carr (1928–1993), American drummer
- Bruno Carranza (1822–1891), former President of Costa Rica
- Bruno Caruso (1927–2018), Italian artist
- Bruno Carvalho, multiple people
- Bruno Casanova, multiple people
- Bruno Casimir (born 1981), Cameroonian footballer
- Bruno Cassinari (1912–1992), Italian painter and sculptor
- Bruno Cassirer (1872–1941), German publisher and art dealer
- Bruno Catalano, French sculptor
- Bruno Catarzi, Italian sculptor
- Bruno Cathala, French judge
- Bruno Cavelti, Swiss gymnast
- Bruno Cazarine (born 1983), Brazilian footballer
- Bruno de Cazenove, French sailor
- Bruno Ceccobelli (born 1952), Italian painter and sculptor
- Bruno Cenghialta (born 1962), Italian cyclist
- Bruno Centeno (born 1988), Argentine footballer
- Bruno Cerella (born 1986), Italian-Argentine basketball player
- Bruno César (born 1988), Italian footballer
- Bruno Cesari (1933–2004), Italian art director
- Bruno Cetraro (born 1998), Uruguayan rower
- Bruno Chalkiadakis (born 1993), Greek footballer
- Bruno Chaudret (born 1953), French chemist
- Bruno Chérier (1817–1880), French painter
- Bruno Cherrier (born 1953), French sprinter
- Bruno Chersicla (1937–2013), Italian painter and sculptor
- Bruno Chevillon (born 1959), French jazz double bassist
- Bruno Cheyrou, French footballer, older brother of Benoit Cheyrou
- Bruno Chimirri (born 1971), Italian equestrian
- Bruno China (born 1982), Portuguese footballer
- Bruno Chizzo (1916–1969), Italian footballer
- Bruno Choël (born 1954), French actor
- Bruno Cipolla (1952–2026), Italian rower
- Bruno Cirillo (born 1977), Italian footballer
- Bruno Cirino (1936–1981), Italian actor
- Bruno Civitico (1942–2019), Italian-born American painter
- Bruno Claußen (1884–?), German lawyer, civil servant and business executive
- Bruno Clausen (1912–1957), Danish sailor
- Bruno Clerbout (born 1976), Belgian triathlete
- Bruno Coceani (1893–1978), Italian politician
- Bruno Coelho (born 1987), Portuguese futsal player
- Bruno Colaço (born 1991), Indian footballer
- Bruno Collaço (born 1990), Brazilian footballer
- Bruno Comparetti (born 1973), French tenor
- Bruno Conti (born 1955), Italian footballer
- Bruno Conti (biologist), Italian-American biologist
- Bruno Coppi (born 1935), Italian-American physicist
- Bruno Corazzari (1940–2021), Italian film, TV and stage actor
- Bruno Corbucci (1931–1996), Italian film director
- Bruno Corelli (1918–1983), Italian actor
- Bruno Cornet (born 1977), Paraguayan fencer
- Bruno Cornillet (born 1963), French cyclist
- Bruno Corra (1892–1976), Italian writer and screenwriter
- Bruno Correa (born 1986), Brazilian footballer
- Bruno Correia (born 1977), Portuguese racing driver
- Bruno Cortês (born 1987), Brazilian football player
- Bruno Cortez (born 1987), Brazilian footballer
- Bruno Coulais (born 1954), French composer
- Bruno Crastes (born 1965), French businessman
- Bruno Cremer (1929–2010), French actor
- Bruno Cunha (born 1997), Portuguese volleyball player
- Bruno Custos (born 1977), French footballer
- Bruno Dacko, Central African politician
- Bruno Dadillon (born 1964), French former professional tennis player
- Bruno Dagens (1935–2023), French archaeologist
- Bruno Dallansky (1928–2008), Austrian actor
- Bruno Damiani (born 2002), Uruguayan footballer
- Bruno De Roeper (1892–1965), British World War I flying ace
- Bruno De Wannemaeker (born 1959), Belgian sports administrator
- Bruno De Zordo (1941–2004), Italian ski jumper
- Bruno Decarli (1877–1950), German actor
- Bruno Decc, Brazilian film director and writer
- Bruno Degazio (born 1958), composer, researcher and film sound designer
- Bruno del Pino (born 2006), Spanish racing driver
- Bruno Delbonnel, French cinematographer
- Bruno Déprez (born 1949), French sports shooter
- Bruno Deschênes (born 1963), Canadian fencer
- Bruno Destrée (1867–1919), Benedictine monk, French-language poet and Belgian literary critic
- Bruno Dettori (1941–2020), Italian politician
- Bruno Dias (born 1976), Portuguese politician
- Bruno Diekmann (1897–1982), German politician
- Bruno Dip, Brazilian footballer
- Bruno Dita (born 1993), Albanian professional footballer
- Bruno Dreossi (born 1964), Italian sprint canoeist
- Bruno Duarte (born 1996), Brazilian footballer
- Bruno Duarte (footballer, born 1995), Argentine footballer
- Bruno Ducol (1949–2024), French composer
- Bruno Duday (1880–1946), German film producer
- Bruno Dugoni (1905–1959), Italian footballer
- Bruno Dumay (born 1960), French rower
- Bruno Dumont (born 1958), French filmmaker
- Bruno Durdov (born 2007), Croatian footballer
- Bruno Durieux (born 1944), French politician
- Bruno Dutot (born 1962), Australian painter
- Bruno Duvergé (born 1957), French politician
- Bruno Dybal (born 1994), Brazilian footballer
- Bruno Echagaray (born 1983), Mexican tennis player
- Bruno Ecuele Manga (born 1988), Gabonese footballer
- Bruno Eichgrün (1877–1937), German actor
- Bruno Eliasen (1933–1995), Danish footballer
- Bruno Elrington (1929–1993), British professional wrestler
- Bruno Engelmeier (1927–1991), Austrian footballer
- Bruno Ernandes (born 1999), Brazilian footballer
- Bruno Fagnoul (1936–2023), Belgian politician
- Bruno Fagundes (born 1989), Brazilian actor
- Bruno Fait (1924–2000), Italian race walker
- Bruno Falissard, French psychiatrist
- Bruno Fanciullacci, Italian anti-fascist partisan
- Bruno Fantinato (born 1941), Italian cyclist
- Bruno Farias (born 1987), Brazilian footballer
- Bruno Fattori (1891–1985), Italian poet
- Bruno Feldeisen, French chef, restaurateur and TV personality
- Bruno Felipe, multiple people
- Bruno Fernandes, multiple people
- Bruno Fernando (born 1998), American basketball player
- Bruno Ferrante (born 1947), Italian prefect
- Bruno Ferraris (born 1992), Argentine professional footballer
- Bruno Ferraz (born 1984), Brazilian footballer
- Bruno Ferreira, multiple people
- Bruno Ferrero (1943–2006), Italian politician
- Bruno Ferry (born 1967), French football manager
- Bruno Fevery, Belgian guitarist
- Bruno Figliola (born 1938), Italian field hockey player
- Bruno Figueroa Fischer, Mexican politician
- Bruno Filippi (1900–1919), Italian anarchist
- Bruno Filippini (1945–2023), Italian singer
- Bruno Finesi (1909–1972), Italian footballer
- Bruno de Finetti (1906–1985), Italian probabilist and statistician
- Bruno Finzi (1899–1974), Italian mathematician and physicist
- Bruno Fischer (1908–1992), American writer
- Bruno Fistori (born 1991), Argentine footballer
- Bruno Fitipaldo (born 1991), Uruguayan-Italian basketball player
- Bruno Fitoussi (born 1958), French poker player
- Bruno Fitzpatrick (1813–1893), Irish Cistercian abbot
- Bruno Flecker (born 1953), Austrian rower
- Bruno Fleischer (1874–1965), German ophthalmologist
- Bruno Flierl (1927–2023), German architect and journalist
- Bruno Fogaça (born 1981), Brazilian footballer
- Bruno Foliados (born 1992), Uruguayan footballer
- Bruno Fonseca (1958–1994), American painter and sculptor
- Bruno Fontes (born 1979), Brazilian sailor
- Bruno Foresti (1923–2022), Italian Roman Catholic prelate
- Bruno Formigoni (born 1990), Brazilian footballer
- Bruno Fornaciari, Italian politician
- Bruno Fornaroli (born 1987), Uruguayan-Australian footballer
- Bruno Forte (born 1949), Italian theologian and ecclesiastic
- Bruno Fortichiari (1892–1981), Italian politician and communist revolutionary
- Bruno Foucher (born 1960), French diplomat
- Bruno Fournier (born 1967), Canadian diver
- Bruno Fragoso, Portuguese tennis player
- Bruno Franceschetti (1941–2025), Italian artistic gymnast
- Bruno Frank (sport shooter), Czech sports shooter
- Bruno Frankewitz (1897–1982), German general
- Bruno Fratus (born 1989), Brazilian swimmer
- Bruno Freindlich (1909–2002), Soviet and Russian actor
- Bruno Freschi (born 1937), Canadian architect
- Bruno Frey (born 1941), Swiss economist
- Bruno von Freytag-Löringhoff (1912–1996), German philosopher
- Bruno Frick (born 1953), Swiss politician
- Bruno Friesenbichler (born 1968), Austrian footballer and manager
- Bruno Frietsch (1896–1996), Finnish sports shooter
- Bruno Frison (1936–2024), Italian ice hockey player
- Bruno Fritz (1900–1984), German actor
- Bruno Fuchs (born 1999), Brazilian footballer
- Bruno Fuchs (born 1959), French politician
- Bruno Fuligni (born 1968), French writer and historian
- Bruno Furlan (born 1992), Brazilian footballer
- Bruno Fuso (born 1988), Brazilian footballer
- Bruno Gabrieli (born 1939), Swiss footballer
- Bruno Gagliasso (born 1982), Brazilian actor
- Bruno Gaido (1916–1942), American aviation machinist
- Bruno Galland (born 1964), French medievalist and archivist
- Bruno Galler (born 1946), Swiss football referee
- Bruno Galliker (1931–2020), Swiss hurdler
- Bruno Gallo (born 1988), Brazilian footballer
- Bruno Galván (born 1994), Argentine footballer
- Bruno Gama (born 1987), Portuguese football player
- Bruno Gamba (1929–1987), Italian rower
- Bruno Ganem (born 1986), Brazilian politician
- Bruno Gantillon (born 1944), French film director and screenwriter
- Bruno Ganz (1941–2019), Swiss actor
- Bruno Garcia, multiple people
- Bruno Garonzi (1926–1950), Italian cyclist
- Bruno Garzena (1933–2024), Italian footballer
- Bruno Gaspar (born 1993), Angolan footballer
- Bruno Gatti (1941–2012), Swiss footballer
- Bruno Gavazzoli, Italian racing driver
- Bruno Gazani (born 1986), Brazilian kickboxer
- Bruno Geddo (born 1959), Italian national
- Bruno Geisler (1857–1945), German ornithologist
- Bruno Génard (born 1961), French modern pentathlete
- Bruno Génésio (born 1966), French footballer and manager
- Bruno Gerber (born 1964), Swiss bobsledder
- Bruno Germain (born 1960), French footballer
- Bruno Gerussi (1928–1995), Canadian actor
- Bruno Gervais (born 1984), Canadian ice hockey player
- Bruno Gerzeli (1925–1982), Italian footballer
- Bruno Gesche (1905–1982), German SS officer
- Bruno Geuens, Belgian cyclist
- Bruno Ghedina (1943–2021), Italian ice hockey player
- Bruno Giacconi (1889–1957), Italian sports shooter
- Bruno Giacomelli (born 1952), Formula 1 driver
- Bruno Giacometti (1907–2012) Swiss architect
- Bruno Giacosa (died 2018), Italian wine producer
- Bruno Gilles (born 1960), French politician
- Bruno Giordano (born 1956), Italian football player and a coach
- Bruno Giorgi (1905–1993), Brazilian sculptor
- Bruno Giorgi (footballer) (1940–2010), Italian football player
- Bruno Girard (born 1970), French boxer
- Bruno di Girolamo, Italian clarinetist
- Bruno Gironcoli (1936–2010), Austrian artist
- Bruno Gissoni (born 1986), Brazilian actor
- Bruno Giuranna (born 1933), Italian violist
- Bruno Glenmark (born 1938), Swedish musician and music executive
- Bruno Goda (born 1998), Croatian footballer
- Bruno Godeau (born 1992), Belgian footballer
- Bruno Goetz (1885–1954), German-Baltic poet, writer and translator
- Bruno Goldammer (1904–1968), German footballer
- Bruno Gollnisch (born 1950), French politician
- Bruno Gomes, multiple people
- Bruno Gonçalves, multiple people
- Bruno Gonçalves Kischinhevsky (born 1994), known as Bruno, Brazilian football midfielder
- Bruno González (born 1990), Spanish footballer
- Bruno Gonzato (born 1944), Italian cyclist
- Bruno Götze (1882–1913), German cyclist
- Bruno Gouery, French actor
- Bruno Goussault, French scientist and chef
- Bruno Goyens de Heusch (born 1959), Belgian equestrian
- Bruno Graf (1953–2020), Swiss footballer
- Bruno Gramaglia (1919–2005), Italian footballer
- Bruno Grandi (1934–2019), Italian gymnast and president of the International Gymnastics Federation
- Bruno Granholm (1857–1930), Finnish architect
- Bruno Granichstaedten (1879–1944), Austrian composer and librettist
- Bruno Grassi (born 1987), Brazilian footballer
- Bruno Graveto (born 1982), Brazilian drummer
- Bruno Grollo (born 1942), Australian businessman
- Bruno Gröning (1906–1959), German mystic
- Bruno Grou (born 1990), Portuguese footballer
- Bruno Grougi (born 1983), French footballer
- Bruno Grusnick (1900–1992), German church musician
- Bruno Guarda (born 1986), Brazilian footballer
- Bruno Gudelj (born 1966), Croatian handball player
- Bruno Guiblet (born 1951), French novelist
- Bruno Guiderdoni, French astrophysicist
- Bruno Guillon (born 1971), French radio and TV presenter
- Bruno Guimarães (born 1997), Brazilian football midfielder
- Bruno Gunn (born 1968), American actor
- Bruno Guse (born 1939), German boxer
- Bruno Gutiérrez (born 2002), Chilean footballer
- Bruno Guttowski (1924–1977), German ice hockey player
- Bruno Gutzeit (born 1966), French butterfly swimmer

===== H–M =====
- Bruno Haas (1891–1952), American baseball player
- Bruno Habārovs (1939–1994), Soviet fencer
- Bruno Hamm (born 1970), French basketball player
- Bruno Hänni (born 1961), Swiss footballer
- Bruno Hartmann (born 1946), Austrian wrestler
- Bruno Richard Hauptmann (1899–1936), perpetrator of the Lindbergh kidnapping
- Bruno de Heceta (1743–1807), Spanish Basque explorer of the Pacific Northwest
- Bruno Heck (1917–1989), German politician
- Bruno Heleno (born 1976), Brazilian footballer
- Bruno Heller (born 1960), English screenwriter
- Bruno Henrique, multiple people
- Bruno Heppell (born 1972), Canadian football player
- Bruno Herrero, Spanish footballer
- Bruno Herrero Arias, Spanish football player
- Bruno de Hesselle (born 1941), Belgian water polo player
- Bruno Hildebrand (1812–1878), German economist
- Bruno Hinze-Reinhold (1877–1964), German pianist and music scholar
- Bruno Hirata (born 1988), Brazilian baseball player
- Bruno Hochmuth (1911–1967) American general
- Bruno Hofer (1861–1916), German fish pathologist
- Bruno Hofstätter, Austrian biathlete
- Bruno Hollnagel (born 1948), German politician
- Bruno Holzträger, Romanian handball player
- Bruno Hönel (born 1996), German politician
- Bruno Hortelano (born 1991), Spanish sprinter
- Bruno Huber (1930–1999), Swiss astrologer
- Bruno Hubschmid (born 1950), Swiss cyclist
- Bruno Huger (born 1962), French cyclist
- Bruno Hussar (1911–1996), Catholic priest
- Bruno Ibeh (born 1995), Nigerian footballer
- Bruno Ierullo, Canadian fashion designer
- Bruno Iglesias, Spanish footballer
- Bruno Ilien (born 1959), French racing driver
- Bruno Martins Indi (born 1992), is a Dutch footballer
- Bruno Innocenti (1906–1986), Italian sculptor
- Bruno Iotti (born 1987), Brazilian footballer
- Bruno Irles (born 1975), French footballer and manager
- Bruno Itoua (born 1956), Congolese politician
- Bruno Iwuoha (died 2021), Nigerian actor
- Bruno Jalander (1872–1966), Finnish military officer
- Bruno Jasieński (1901–1938), Polish poet and activist
- Bruno Jenkins, multiple people
- Bruno Jerebicnik (born 1947), Austrian modern pentathlete
- Bruno Jesi (1916–1943), Italian soldier
- Bruno Jesus (born 1997), Brazilian footballer
- Bruno Jonas (born 1952), German Kabarett artist and actor
- Bruno Joncour (born 1953), French politician
- Bruno Jordão (born 1998), Portuguese footballer
- Bruno José (born 1998), Brazilian football player
- Bruno Julie (born 1978), Mauritian boxer
- Bruno Julliard (born 1981), French politician
- Bruno Junk (1929–1995), Estonian racewalker
- Bruno Junqueira (born 1976), Brazilian racing driver
- Bruno Juričić, Croatian architect
- Bruno Jutzeler (born 1946), Swiss wrestler
- Bruno Kafka (1881–1931), Czech politician
- Brūno Kalniņš (1899–1990), Latvian politician
- Bruno Kastner (1890–1932), German actor
- Bruno Franz Kaulbach (1880–1963), Austrian lawyer
- Bruno Keil (1859–1916), German philologist
- Bruno Kepi (born 1988), Albanian footballer
- Bruno Kernen, multiple people
- Bruno Kessler (1924–1991), Italian politician
- Bruno de Keyzer (1949–2019), French cinematographer
- Bruno Kirby (1949–2006), American actor
- Bruno Kivikoski (1892–1982), Finnish diplomat and lawyer
- Bruno Klein (1858–1911), American classical composer
- Bruno Kneubühler (born 1946), Swiss motorcycle racer
- Bruno Knežević (1915–1982), Croatian footballer
- Bruno Koagne Tokam (born 1978), Cameroonian footballer
- Bruno Köbele (born 1934), German trade unionist
- Bruno Konczylo (born 1968), French middle-distance runner
- Bruno Koschmider (1926–2000), German entrepreneur
- Bruno Kouamé (1927–2021), Ivorian Roman Catholic bishop
- Bruno Kovačić (born 1967), Croatian musician and composer
- Bruno Kozina (born 1992), Croatian handball player
- Bruno Kramm (born 1967), German musician
- Bruno Krenkel (born 1998), Brazilian football player
- Bruno Kreisky (1911–1990), Austrian chancellor from 1970 to 1983
- Bruno Kuehne, Austrian para-alpine skier and cyclist
- Bruno Kurowski (1879–1944), German politician
- Bruno Kurz (born 1957), German painter
- Bruno Kuzuhara, American tennis player
- Bruno Lábaque (born 1977), Argentine basketball player
- Bruno Labbadia (born 1966), German football player and manager
- Bruno Lafont (born 1956), French businessman
- Bruno Lafranchi (born 1955), Swiss long-distance runner
- Bruno Lage (born 1976), Portuguese football manager
- Bruno Lamas (born 1994), Brazilian footballer
- Bruno Lança (born 1983), Brazilian footballer
- Bruno Landgraf (born 1986), Brazilian footballer
- Bruno Landi, multiple people
- Bruno Langa (born 1997), Mozambican footballer
- Bruno Langley (born 1987), British actor
- Bruno Langlois (born 1979), Canadian racing cyclist
- Bruno Lanteri (1759–1830), Italian priest
- Bruno Lanvin (born 1954), executive director of INSEAD
- Bruno Lapa (born 1997), Brazilian footballer
- Bruno Latour (1947–2022), French sociologist and cultural theorist
- Bruno Laurioux, French Medievalist historian
- Bruno Lauzi (1937–2006), Italian singer-songwriter
- Bruno Lawrence (1941–1995), New Zealand actor
- Bruno Lazaro, Spanish film director
- Bruno Lazaroni (born 1980), Brazilian footballer and manager
- Bruno Le Maire (born 1969), French politician, writer and former diplomat
- Bruno Le Roux (born 1965), French politician
- Bruno Le Stum (born 1959), French long-distance runner
- Bruno Leali (born 1958), Italian cyclist
- Bruno Lebras (born 1962), French cycle-cross cyclist
- Bruno Lebrun (born 1956), French weightlifter
- Bruno Léchevin (1952–2020), French trade unionist
- Bruno Leibundgut (born 1960), Swiss astronomer
- Bruno Leingkone, Vanuatuan politician
- Bruno Leite (born 1995), Portuguese/Cape Verdean footballer
- Bruno Leite (footballer, born 2000), Brazilian footballer
- Bruno Lemaitre (born 1965), French immunologist
- Bruno Lemiechevsky (born 1994), Uruguayan footballer
- Bruno Lenz (1911–2006), German painter and violinist
- Bruno Leoni (1913–1967), Italian political philosopher (classical liberalism) and lawyer
- Bruno Leonardo (born 1996), Brazilian footballer
- Bruno Lesaffre (born 1962), French swimmer
- Bruno Leuzinger (1886–1952), Swiss ice hockey player
- Bruno Liberda (born 1953), Austrian composer
- Bruno Franz Leopold Liebermann (1759–1844), German Catholic theologian
- Bruno Liljefors (1860–1939), Swedish artist
- Bruno Lima (born 1996), Argentine volleyball player
- Bruno Lima (politician) (born 1986), Brazilian politician
- Bruno Limido (born 1961), Italian footballer
- Bruno Lipi (born 1994), Albanian footballer
- Bruno Lips (1908–?), Swiss canoeist
- Bruno Liuzzi (born 2000), Argentine-Chilean footballer
- Bruno Loatti (1915–1962), Italian cyclist
- Bruno Lobo, Brazilian sailor
- Bruno Locher, Swiss footballer
- Bruno Lochet (born 1959), French actor
- Bruno Loerzer (1891–1960), German Air Force officer
- Bruno Lohse (1911–2007), German art dealer
- Bruno Loi (born 1941), Italian general
- Bruno Lopes, multiple people
- Bruno López (born 1971), Spanish rower
- Bruno Loscos (born 1975), French speed skater
- Bruno Loureiro (born 1989), Portuguese footballer
- Bruno Lourenço (born 1998), Portuguese footballer
- Bruno Lozano, American politician
- Bruno Lucchesi (1926–2026), Italian-American sculptor
- Bruno Lucia (born 1960), Australian stand-up comedian and performer
- Bruno Lüdke (1908–1944), German, an alleged prolific serial killer
- Bruno Luiz (born 1984), Brazilian footballer
- Bruno Lukk (1909–1991), Estonian pianist and pedagogue
- Bruno Lulaj (born 1995), Albanian footballer
- Bruno Lutz (1889–1964), German art director
- Bruno Luz (born 1988), Portuguese footballer
- Bruno Luzi (born 1965), French football manager and former player
- Bruno Maag, Swiss typographer
- Bruno Maçães, Portuguese philosopher, journalist, politician, consultant and author
- Bruno Madaule (1971–2020), French comic book author
- Bruno Maddox (born 1969), British novelist and journalist
- Bruno Madeira (born 1984), Portuguese footballer
- Bruno Maderna (1920–1973), Italian composer and conductor
- Bruno Magalhães (born 1980), Portuguese racing driver
- Bruno Magalhães (footballer) (born 1982), Portuguese footballer
- Bruno Magli, Italian shoe designer
- Bruno Magras (born 1951), French politician
- Bruno Mahlow (1937–2023), German politician
- Bruno Maia (born 1988), Brazilian footballer
- Bruno Major (born 1988), British singer-songwriter
- Bruno Malaguti (1887–1945), Italian general of World War II
- Bruno Malfacine (born 1986), Brazilian Jiu-Jitsu practitioner and mixed martial artist
- Bruno Maltar (born 1994), Croatian cyclist
- Bruno Ecuele Manga (born 1988), Gabonese footballer
- Bruno Mankowski (1902–1990), American sculptor
- Bruno Manser (1954–2005), Swiss environmental activist
- Bruno Mantovani (born 1974), French composer
- Bruno Marchand, Canadian politician
- Bruno Marcotte (born 1974), Canadian pairs figure skater and coach
- Bruno Marie-Rose (born 1965), French sprinter
- Bruno Marinho (born 1984), Brazilian footballer
- Bruno Marioni (born 1975), Argentine footballer
- Bruno Marques (born 1999), Brazilian footballer
- Bruno Mars (born 1985), American singer-songwriter and music producer
- Bruno Martella (born 1992), Italian footballer
- Bruno Martelotto (born 1982), Argentine footballer
- Bruno Martignoni (born 1992), Swiss footballer
- Bruno Martinato (born 1935), Luxembourgish cyclist
- Bruno Martini (1962–2020), French footballer
- Bruno Martini (gymnast) (born 1987), Brazilian trampoline gymnast
- Bruno Martini (handballer) (born 1970), French handball player
- Bruno Martino (1925–2000), Italian musical artist
- Bruno Martins Indi (born 1992), Dutch footballer
- Bruno Mascarenhas (born 1981), Italian rower
- Bruno Masciadri (1914–2001), Swiss canoeist
- Bruno Mascolo, Italian basketball player
- Bruno Massot (born 1989), French-German figure skater
- Bruno Mathieu (born 1958), French organist
- Bruno Mathsson (1907–1988), Swedish furniture designer and architect
- Bruno Matias (footballer, born 1989), Portuguese footballer
- Bruno Matias (footballer, born 1999), Brazilian footballer
- Bruno Matos (born 1990), Brazilian footballer
- Bruno Mattei (1931–2007), Italian film director
- Bruno Mattiussi (1926–1981), Luxembourgish boxer
- Bruno Matykiewicz, Polish Czech weightlifter
- Bruno Mauro (born 1973), Angolan footballer
- Bruno Maximus (born 1970), Finnish art painter
- Bruno Maynard (born 1971), French ice hockey forward
- Bruno Mazza (1924–2012), Italian footballer
- Bruno Mazzia (born 1941), Italian footballer and coach
- Bruno Mealli (1937–2023), Italian cyclist
- Bruno Mégret (born 1949), French politician
- Bruno Mehsarosch (1934–2009), Austrian footballer
- Bruno Melo (born 1992), Brazilian footballer
- Bruno Menard, a 3-Michelin-star French chef
- Bruno Mendes, multiple people
- Bruno Mendonça (born 1985), Brazilian judoka
- Bruno Mendonça (field hockey) (born 1984), Brazilian field hockey player
- Bruno Meneghel (born 1987), Brazilian footballer
- Bruno Menezes (born 1984), Brazilian footballer
- Bruno Merz (born 1976), New Zealand musical artist
- Bruno Messerli (1931–2019), Swiss geographer and university professor
- Bruno Metsu (1954–2013), French footballer and football manager
- Bruno Meyer, multiple people
- Bruno Mezenga (born 1988), Brazilian footballer
- Bruno Michaud (1935–1997), Swiss footballer and manager
- Bruno Michel (born 1999), Brazilian footballer
- Bruno Migliorini (1896–1975), Italian linguist and philologist
- Bruno Mignot (born 1958), French football player and manager
- Bruno Miguel (born 1982), Portuguese footballer
- Bruno Milesi (born 1965), Italian speed skater
- Bruno Millienne (born 1959), French politician
- Bruno Mineiro (born 1983), Brazilian footballer
- Bruno Mingeon (born 1967), French bobsleigher
- Bruno Miranda (born 1998), Bolivian footballer
- Bruno Möhring (1863–1929), German architect
- Bruno Monden (1900–1980), German art director
- Bruno Mondi (1903–1991), German cinematographer
- Bruno de Monès (born 1952), French photographer
- Bruno Monguzzi (born 1941), Swiss graphic designer
- Bruno Monteiro (born 1984), Portuguese footballer
- Bruno Montelongo (born 1987), Uruguayan footballer
- Bruno Monti (1930–2011), Italian cyclist
- Bruno Mora (1937–1986), Italian footballer
- Bruno Moraes, multiple people
- Bruno Morais (born 1998), Portuguese footballer
- Bruno Moreira (born 1987), Portuguese footballer
- Bruno (footballer, born 1989), full name Bruno Moreira Silva, Brazilian footballer
- Bruno (footballer, born 1999), full name Bruno Moreira Soares, Brazilian footballer
- Bruno Moretti (born 1957), Italian composer, pianist and conductor
- Bruno Moretti (Paralympian) (1941–2021), Australian Paralympic athlete
- Bruno Morgado (born 1997), Swiss footballer
- Bruno Moritz (1898–1966), German-Ecuadorian chess player
- Bruno Morri (born 1946), Sammarinese sport shooter
- Bruno Mota, Swiss footballer
- Bruno Mota (Brazilian footballer) (born 1995), Brazilian footballer
- Bruno Moura (born 1993), Portuguese footballer
- Bruno Moynot (born 1950), French actor and theatre director
- Bruno Mráz (born 1993), Slovak ice hockey player
- Bruno Müller (1905–1960), served as an SS-Obersturmbannführer during the Nazi German invasion of Poland
- Bruno Munari (1907–1998), Italian industrial designer
- Bruno Murari (born 1936), Italian inventor
- Bruno Musarò (born 1948), Italian prelate of the Catholic Church
- Bruno Mussolini (1918–1941), son of Benito Mussolini

===== N–Z =====
- Bruno Nachtergaele, Belgian mathematical physicist
- Bruno Nascimento (born 1991), Brazilian footballer
- Bruno Nazário (born 1995), Brazilian footballer
- Bruno Neri (1910–1944) Italian football player and partisan
- Bruno Nettl (1930–2020), American ethnomusicologist
- Bruno Neumann (1883–1943), German military officer and equestrian
- Bruno Neves (1981–2008), Portuguese cyclist
- Bruno Ngotty (born 1971), French footballer
- Bruno Nhavene (born 2002), Mozambican tennis player
- Bruno Nicolai (1926–1991), Italian musical artist
- Bruno Nicolè (1940–2019), Italian footballer
- Bruno Niedziela (1923–1962), American football player
- Bruno Ninaber van Eyben (born 1950), Dutch jewellery and industrial designer
- Bruno Nobili (born 1949), Italian-Venezuelan footballer and coach
- Bruno Nöckler (1956–1982), Italian alpine skier
- Bruno Nogueira (born 1982), Portuguese actor
- Bruno (footballer, born 1994), full name Bruno Nogueira Barbosa, Brazilian football player
- Bruno Nolasco (born 1986), Brazilian water polo player
- Bruno Nunes (born 1990), Brazilian football player
- Bruno Nuytten (born 1945), French cinematographer turned director
- Bruno Oberhammer (born 1955), Italian para-alpine skier
- Bruno Oberle (born 1955), Swiss biologist
- Bruno Ochman (1929–1990), Canadian wrestler
- Bruno Octávio (born 1985), Brazilian footballer
- Bruno K. Öijer (born 1951), Swedish poet
- Bruno Oldani (1936–2021), Swiss designer
- Bruno Oliveira, multiple people
- Bruno Ondo Mengue (born 1992), Equatoguinean basketball player
- Bruno Onyemaechi, Nigerian footballer
- Bruno Orešar (born 1967), Croatian businessman and tennis player
- Bruno Orsoni (born 1973), French swimmer
- Bruno Ortiz-Cañavate (born 1993), Spanish swimmer
- Bruno Osimo (born 1958), Italian writer and scholar
- Bruno Pabois (born 1969), French footballer
- Bruno Pacheco (born 1991), Brazilian footballer
- Bruno Pacheco (politician), Peruvian educator, politician and fugitive
- Bruno Padulazzi (1927–2005), Italian footballer
- Bruno Paes, multiple people
- Bruno Paes Manso, Brazilian journalist and researcher
- Bruno Pais (born 1981), Portuguese triathlete
- Bruno Paixão (born 1974), Portuguese football referee
- Bruno Palazzo (born 2000), Argentine professional footballer
- Bruno Pao (1931–2025), Estonian maritime historian and writer
- Bruno Paraíba, Brazilian footballer
- Bruno Parente (born 1981), Portuguese footballer
- Bruno Parma (1941–2026), Slovene-Yugoslav chess Grandmaster
- Bruno Parovel (1913–1994), Italian rower
- Bruno Pascua (born 1990), Spanish footballer
- Bruno Pasqualini (born 1973), Italian rower
- Bruno Pasquier (born 1943), French violist
- Bruno Pasquini (1914–1995), Italian cyclist
- Bruno Passaro (born 1989), Argentine equestrian
- Bruno Patacas (born 1977), Portuguese footballer
- Bruno Paul (1874–1968), German architect
- Bruno Pauletto (born 1954), Italian-Canadian shot putter
- Bruno Paulista (born 1995), Brazilian footballer
- Bruno Paulo (born 1990), Brazilian footballer
- Bruno Pavelić (1937–2021), Serbian basketball player
- Bruno Paz (born 1998), Angolan footballer
- Bruno Pedron (1944–2022), Italian priest and theologian
- Bruno Peinado (born 1970), French artist
- Bruno Pelissari (born 1993), Brazilian footballer
- Bruno Pelletier (born 1962), Canadian singer
- Bruno Pellizzari (1907–1991), Italian cyclist
- Bruno Peltre, French classical pianist
- Bruno Pereira (1980–2022), Brazilian indigenist
- Bruno Pereirinha (born 1988), Portuguese footballer
- Bruno Peres (born 1990), Brazilian footballer
- Bruno Perone (born 1987), Brazilian footballer
- Bruno Perreau (born 1976), French political scientist
- Bruno Pesaola (1925–2015), Italian Argentine football player and manager
- Bruno Pesce (born 1979), Palestinian footballer
- Bruno Petković (born 1994), Croatian professional footballer
- Bruno Petrachi (born 1997), Italian footballer
- Bruno Petrarca (1906–1977), Italian boxer
- Bruno Petroni (1941–2014), Italian footballer
- Bruno Petronio (1936–2002), Italian sailor
- Bruno Peyron (born 1955), French yachtsman
- Bruno Pezzella (born 1988), Argentine footballer
- Bruno Pezzey (1955–1994), Austrian footballer
- Bruno Pianissolla (born 1987), Brazilian footballer
- Bruno Piano (born 1977), Uruguayan footballer
- Bruno Piazzalunga (born 1944), Italian alpine skier
- Bruno Piceno (born 1991), American soccer player
- Bruno Pieters (born 1975), Belgian fashion designer
- Bruno Piglhein (1848–1894), German sculptor and painter
- Bruno Piñatares (born 1990), Uruguayan footballer
- Bruno Pinchard (born 1955), French philosopher
- Bruno Pinheiro, multiple people
- Bruno Pires, multiple people
- Bruno Pirri (born 1992), Brazilian footballer
- Bruno Pittón (born 1993), Argentine footballer
- Bruno Piva (born 1946), Italian politician
- Bruno Pivetti (born 1984), Brazilian football manager
- Bruno Pizzul (1938–2025), Italian journalist and footballer
- Bruno Podalydès (born 1961), French writer, film director, producer and actor
- Bruno Georges Pollet (born 1969), French electrochemist
- Bruno Pontecorvo (1913–1993), Italian nuclear physicist
- Bruno Poromaa (1936–2016), Swedish politician
- Bruno Portugal (born 2003), Peruvian footballer
- Bruno Postiglioni (born 1987), rugby player
- Bruno Potanah (born 1967), Mauritian sprinter
- Bruno Prada (born 1971), Brazilian sailor
- Bruno Prasil (born 1950), Canadian volleyball player
- Bruno Praxedes (born 2002), Brazilian footballer
- Bruno Premiani (1907–1984), Austrian-Hungarian comic book artist
- Bruno Prevedi (1928–1988) Italian opera singer
- Bruno Procopio, Brazilian musician
- Bruno Pucci (born 1990), Brazilian practitioner of Jiu-Jitsu and mixed martial arts
- Bruno Puja (born 2000), Albanian footballer
- Bruno Putzulu (born 1967), French actor
- Bruno Quadros (born 1977), Brazilian footballer and manager
- Bruno Quaresima (1920–1999), Italian footballer
- Bruno Questel (born 1966), French politician
- Bruno Råberg (born 1954), Swedish musical artist
- Bruno Racine (born 1951), French civil servant and writer
- Bruno Radicioni (1933–1997), Italian painter
- Bruno Radotić (born 1983), Croatian bicycle racer
- Bruno Rahmen (born 1948), Swiss footballer and manager
- Bruno Rajaonson, Malagasy politician
- Bruno Rajaozara (born 1981), Malagasy footballer
- Bruno Ramires (born 1994), Brazilian footballer
- Bruno Ramírez, Bissau-Guinean footballer
- Bruno Ramos (born 1950), senator of Puerto Rico
- Bruno Josvah Randrianantenaina (born 1957), Malagasy politician
- Bruno Rangel (1981–2016), Brazilian footballer
- Bruno Rato, Brazilian footballer
- Bruno Ravel (born 1964), musical artist
- Bruno Ravina (born 1984), Mauritian footballer
- Bruno Recife (born 1982), Brazilian footballer
- Bruno Reichart (born 1943), German cardiothoracic surgeon
- Bruno Reichlin (born 1941), Swiss architect
- Bruno Reis (born 1999), Portuguese footballer
- Bruno Reis (footballer, born 1978), Brazilian footballer
- Bruno Renan (born 1991), Brazilian footballer
- Bruno Renan Trombelli (born 1991), Brazilian football player
- Bruno Retailleau (born 1960), French politician
- Bruno Reuteler (born 1971), Swiss ski jumper
- Bruno Reversade (born 1978), American geneticist
- Bruno Rey (1935–2019), Swiss industrial designer
- Henri Reynders (1903–1981), Catholic priest, under the name Dom Bruno, credited with saving 400 Jews during the Holocaust
- Bruno Rezende (born 1986), Brazilian volleyball player
- Bruno Ribeiro (born 1975), Portuguese football manager and former player
- Bruno Ribeiro (Brazilian footballer) (born 1983), Brazilian footballer
- Bruno Riem (1923–1992), Swiss modern pentathlete
- Bruno Rigutto (born 1945), French pianist, composer and conductor
- Bruno Risi (born 1968), Swiss cyclist
- Bruno Ritter von Hauenschild (1896–1953), German general
- Bruno Rizzi (1901–1977), Italian political theorist
- Bruno Rodrigo (born 1985), Brazilian footballer
- Bruno Rodrigues, multiple people
- Bruno Rodríguez, multiple people
- Bruno Rodzik (1935–1998), French footballer
- Bruno Roger-Petit (born 1962), French journalist
- Bruno Rogger (born 1959), Canadian-born Swiss ice hockey player
- Bruno Roghi (1894–1962), Italian sports journalist
- Bruno Rojas (born 1993), Bolivian sprinter
- Bruno David Roma (born 1989), Brazilian footballer
- Bruno Romani (born 1960), Italian saxophonist, flautist and composer
- Bruno Romão (born 1984), Portuguese football manager
- Bruno Romo (born 1989), Chilean footballer
- Bruno Roque (born 1989), Brazilian footballer
- Bruno Rosa, Brazilian tennis player
- Bruno Rosetti (born 1988), Italian rower
- Bruno Rossetti (1960–2018), Italian sports shooter
- Bruno Rossi (1905–1993), Italian-American experimental physicist
- Bruno Rossignol, French conductor and composer
- Bruno Roth (1911–1998), German cyclist
- Bruno Roux (born 1963), French football manager and former player
- Bruno Rubeo (1946–2011), production designer
- Bruno Rubess (1926–2009), Latvian businessman
- Bruno Ruffo (1920–2007), Italian motorcycle road racer
- Bruno Ruzza (1926–2019), Italian footballer
- Bruno Ryves (1596–1677), English priest
- Bruno S. (1932–2010), German film actor, artist and musician Bruno Schleinstein
- Bruno Saby (born 1949), French racer
- Bruno Sacchi (1931–2011), Italian architect
- Bruno Sacco (1933–2024), Italian-German automobile designer
- Bruno Saetti (1902–1984), Italian painter
- Bruno Saile (born 1952), Swiss rower
- Bruno Saindini, Malagasy football manager
- Bruno Salomone (1970–2026), French actor and comedian
- Bruno (footballer, born 1980), full name Bruno Saltor Grau, Spanish former football player
- Bruno Salzer (1859–1919), German entrepreneur
- Bruno Sambo, French footballer
- Bruno Sammartino (1935–2018) Italian-American wrestler
- Bruno Sandoval (born 1991), Mexican boxer
- Bruno Sandras (born 1961), French Polynesian politician
- Bruno Sanfilippo (born 1965), Argentine pianist and composer
- Bruno Sant'Anna (born 1993), Brazilian tennis player
- Bruno Santana (born 1982), Brazilian handball player
- Bruno Santon (1942–2023), Italian footballer
- Bruno Santos, multiple people
- Bruno Giordano Sanzin (1906–1994), Italian poet
- Bruno Sapo (born 1986), Portuguese footballer
- Bruno Saraiva (born 1974), Portuguese football manager and former player
- Bruno Sarlin (1878–1951), Finnish jurist and politician
- Bruno Sassi (born 1970), American wrestler
- Bruno Saul (1932–2022), Estonian politician
- Bruno Saunier (born 1963), French ice hockey player
- Bruno Sávio (born 1994), Brazilian footballer
- Bruno Savry (born 1974), French footballer
- Bruno Scheid (born 1983), Brazilian politician
- Bruno Gustav Scherwitz (1896–1985), German Nazi Party official and Luftwaffe officer
- Bruno Schiavi (born 1972), Australian fashion designer
- Bruno Schlokat (1898–1993), German javelin thrower
- Bruno Oscar Schmidt (born 1986), Brazilian beach volleyball player
- Bruno Schmidt (born 1968), Belgian chef and businessman
- Bruno Schmitz (1858–1916), German architect
- Bruno Schroder (1933–2019), British banker
- Bruno Schulz (1892–1942) Polish writer
- Bruno Schulz (architect) (1865–1932), German architectural historian
- Bruno Schweizer (1897–1958), German linguist
- Bruno Scipioni (1934–2019), Italian actor
- Bruno Scolari (1961–2009), Italian equestrian
- Bruno Segre (1918–2024), Italian lawyer, journalist and politician
- Bruno Seidler-Winkler (1880–1960), German conductor, pianist and music arranger
- Bruno Seidlhofer (1905–1982), Austrian classical pianist
- Bruno Semenzato (born 1992), Brazilian tennis player
- Bruno Senna (born 1983), Brazilian race car driver
- Bruno Sepúlveda (born 1992), Argentine footballer
- Bruno Sevaistre (born 1966), French film director
- Bruno Severino (born 1986), Portuguese footballer
- Bruno Siciliano, multiple people
- Bruno Sido (born 1951), French politician
- Bruno Siebert, Chilean army general
- Bruno Edgar Siegheim (1875–1952), German-South African chess player
- Bruno Šiklić (born 1983), Croatian footballer
- Bruno Silva, multiple people
- Bruno Simão (born 1985), Portuguese footballer
- Bruno Simões, multiple people
- Bruno Smith (born 1992), Brazilian footballer
- Bruno Snell (1896–1986), German classical philologist
- Bruno Soares (born 1982), Brazilian tennis player
- Bruno Soares (footballer) (born 1988), Brazilian footballer
- Bruno Soares Reis, mayor of Salvador, Bahia and Brazil
- Bruno Söderström (1881–1969), Swedish track and field athlete
- Bruno Solnik (born 1946), French professor
- Bruno Soriano (born 1984), Spanish football player
- Bruno Sorić (1904–1942), Croatian rower
- Bruno Sotty (born 1949), French racing driver
- Bruno Sousa (born 1996), Portuguese footballer
- Bruno Souza, multiple people
- Bruno Spaggiari (born 1933), Italian motorcycle racer
- Bruno Spagnolini, Italian engineer and businessman
- Bruno Spengler (born 1983), Canadian racing driver
- Bruno Sperani (1840–1923), Italian writer
- Bruno Splieth (1917–1990), German sailor
- Bruno Spoerri (born 1935), Swiss jazz and electronics musician
- Bruno St. Jacques, Canadian ice hockey player
- Bruno Steck (born 1957), French footballer and manager
- Bruno Stefanini (1924–2018), Swiss art collector
- Bruno Steimer (born 1959), German historian
- Bruno Steinhoff (born 1937), German businessman
- Bruno Stephan (1907–1981), German cinematographer
- Bruno Sterzi, Italian racing driver
- Bruno Stolorz (born 1955), French rugby player
- Bruno Storti (1913–1994), Italian politician
- Bruno Streckenbach (1902–1977), German SS general
- Bruno Studer (born 1978), French politician
- Bruno Sundman (1920–2002), Finnish politician
- Bruno Šundov (born 1980), Croatian basketball player
- Bruno Sutkus (1924–2003), recipient of the Iron Cross
- Bruno Sutter, multiple people
- Bruno Suzuki (born 1990), Brazilian footballer
- Bruno Tabacci (born 1946), Italian politician
- Bruno Tabata (born 1997), Brazilian footballer
- Bruno Tarimo (born 1995), Tanzanian boxer
- Bruno Taut (1880–1938), German architect, urban planner and author
- Bruno Tavares (born 2002), Portuguese football player
- Bruno Tedino (born 1964), Italian football manager
- Bruno Teles (born 1986), Brazilian footballer
- Bruno Telushi (born 1990), Albanian footballer
- Bruno Tesch (1890–1946), German chemist and war criminal
- Bruno Tesch (antifascist) (1913–1993), German communist activist
- Bruno Thiry (born 1962), Belgian rally driver
- Bruno Thüring (1905–1989), German physicist and astronomer
- Bruno Thürlimann (1923–2008), Swiss civil engineer
- Bruno Tiago, multiple people
- Bruno Tideman (1834–1883), Dutch naval engineer
- Bruno Timm (1902–1972), German cinematographer
- Bruno Tobback (born 1969), Flemish politician
- Bruno Tognaccini (1932–2013), Italian cyclist
- Bruno Toledo, multiple people
- Bruno Tolentino (1940–2007), Brazilian poet and intellectual
- Bruno Tommasi (1930–2015), Italian archbishop and theologian
- Bruno Tommaso (born 1946), Italian jazz musician and composer
- Bruno Tonioli (born 1955), Italian dancer and choreographer
- Bruno Toniolli (born 1943), Italian speed skater
- Bruno Torpigliani (1915–1995), Italian prelate
- Bruno Touschek (1921–1978), Austrian physicist
- Bruno Tozzi (1656–1743), Italian naturalist
- Bruno Trani (1928–2022), Italian sailor
- Bruno Trentin (1926–2007), Italian trade unionist and politician
- Bruno Trojani (1907–1966), Swiss ski jumper
- Bruno Troublé (born 1945), French sailor
- Bruno Tshibala (born 1956), Congolese politician
- Bruno Tubarão (born 1995), Brazilian footballer
- Bruno Turco (born 1991), Brazilian footballer
- Bruno Turner (born 1931), British musicologist
- Bruno Tuybens (born 1961), Belgian politician
- Bruno Umile (born 2003), Italian footballer
- Bruno Urlić (born 1975), Bosnian musical artist
- Bruno Urribarri (born 1986), Argentine footballer
- Bruno Uvini (born 1991), Brazilian footballer
- Bruno Valdez, multiple people
- Bruno Vale (born 1983), Portuguese footballer
- Bruno Vale (Italian footballer) (1911–?), Italian footballer and coach
- Bruno Valencony (born 1968), French footballer
- Bruno Valente (born 1982), Portuguese footballer
- Bruno Valentini (born 1955), Italian politician
- Bruno Van Peteghem (died 2022), New Caledonian environmentalist
- Bruno Vanryb (1957–2019), French entrepreneur
- Bruno Varani (1925–2005), Argentine basketball player
- Bruno Varela (born 1994), Cape Verdean footballer
- Bruno Vattovaz (1912–1943), Italian rower
- Bruno (footballer, born 1970), full name Bruno Alexandre Vaza Ferreira, Portuguese former football player
- Bruno Veglio (born 1998), Uruguayan football player
- Bruno Veiga (born 1990), Brazilian footballer
- Bruno Vella (1933–2021), Italian politician
- Bruno Ventura, Portuguese footballer
- Bruno Venturini (1911–1991), Italian footballer
- Bruno Verges (born 1975), French international rugby union player
- Bruno Verner, Brazilian musician and poet
- Bruno Versavel (born 1967), Belgian footballer
- Bruno Veselica (1936–2018), Croatian footballer
- Bruno VeSota (1922–1976), American actor
- Bruno Vespa (born 1944), Italian TV and newspaper journalist
- Bruno Viana (born 1995), Brazilian footballer
- Bruno Leonardo Vicente (born 1989), Brazilian footballer
- Bruno Vicino (born 1952), Italian cyclist
- Bruno Vides (born 1993), Argentine footballer
- Bruno von Vietinghoff (1849–1905), Russian naval captain
- Bruno Villabruna (1884–1971), Italian politician
- Bruno Vinicius, Brazilian footballer
- Bruno Visentini (1914–1995), Italian politician
- Bruno Visintin (1932–2015), Italian boxer
- Bruno Vlahek (born 1986), Croatian-born pianist and composer
- Bruno Vogel (1898–1987), German pacifist and writer
- Bruno Volpi (born 1993), Argentine footballer
- Bruno Walliser (born 1966), Swiss politician
- Bruno Walter (1876–1962), German conductor and composer
- Bruno Wartelle, French boxer
- Bruno Wavelet (born 1974), French sprinter
- Bruno Weber, multiple people
- Bruno Weil (born 1949), German conductor
- Bruno Wille (1860–1928), German politician
- Bruno Wilson (born 1996), Portuguese footballer
- Bruno de Witte (born 1955), Belgian legal scholar
- Bruno Wojtinek (born 1963), French cyclist
- Bruno Wolfer (born 1954), Swiss cyclist
- Bruno Wolke (1904–1973), German cyclist
- Bruno Wolkowitch (born 1961), French actor
- Bruno Wu, Chinese businessman and media mogul
- Bruno Wurzer, Italian luger
- Bruno Xavier, multiple people
- Bruno Yizek (born 1948), Canadian wheelchair curler
- Bruno Zach (1891–1935), Austrian art deco sculptor
- Bruno Zamborlin (born 1983), Italian researcher, entrepreneur and artist
- Bruno Zambrini (born 1935), Italian composer and record producer
- Bruno Zandonaide (1981–2012), Brazilian footballer
- Bruno Zanin (1951–2024), Italian actor and writer
- Bruno Zanoni (1951–2023), Italian cyclist
- Bruno Zapelli, association football player
- Bruno Zaremba (1955–2018), French footballer
- Bruno Zarrillo (born 1966), Italian-Canadian ice hockey player
- Bruno Zebie (born 1995), Canadian soccer player
- Bruno Zeltner (born 1967), Swiss sailor
- Bruno Zevi (1918–2000), Italian architect
- Bruno Ziener (1870–1941), German actor
- Bruno Zilliacus (1877–1926), Finnish athletics competitor
- Bruno Zimm, multiple people
- Bruno Zirato (1884–1972), Italian-American music manager
- Bruno Zirato Jr. (1921/1922–2008), American director and producer
- Bruno Zita Mbanangoyé (born 1980), Gabonese footballer
- Bruno Zorzi (1937–2026), Australian rules footballer
- Bruno Zuculini (born 1993), Argentine footballer
- Bruno Zumino (1923–2014), Italian theoretical physicist
- Bruno Zwintscher (1838–1905), German piano educator

=== Fictional characters ===
- the title character of Bruno (webcomic), by Christopher Baldwin
- Bruno Azrael, a character in the anime Gundam SEED Destiny
- Bruno the Bear, a rival of Bugs Bunny in the Warner Brothers short Big Top Bunny
- Bruno the Bear, in the TV series Edward and Friends
- Brake Car Bruno, a caboose in Thomas & Friends: All Engines Go
- Bruno the Bigfoot, in the Sam & Max Hit the Road computer game
- the lead character of Bruno the Kid, a 1990s animated series
- Bruno, in the Sesame Street television show
- Bruno, from Lewis Carroll's novel Sylvie and Bruno
- Bruno, in the 2006 novel The Boy in the Striped Pyjamas
- Bruno, a robot from Mega Man Legends
- Bruno, a bear character in the animated series Total Drama
- Bruno, a dog in the 1950 Disney animated film Cinderella
- Bruno, 1930s animated cartoon pet dog belonging to Bosko
- Bruno, in the Pokémon video games
- Bruno, a villain from DC Comics
- Bruno Antony, the villain of Alfred Hitchcock's film Strangers on a Train
- Bruno Bucciarati, in the Japanese manga JoJo's Bizarre Adventure
- Bruno Cortona, in the 1948 film The Easy Life
- Bruno di Marco, in the British soap opera EastEnders
- Brüno Gehard, portrayed by Sacha Baron Cohen on television and in the 2009 film Brüno
- Bruno Gianelli, in the TV series The West Wing
- Bruno J. Global, in the Japanese anime Macross
- Bruno Madrigal, one of the main protagonists of Encanto
- Bruno Mannheim, a DC Comics character
- Bruno Martelli, in the TV series Fame
- Bruno Martinez, in the video game Grim Fandango
- Bruno Ricci, in the 1948 film Bicycle Thieves
- Bruno Sheppard, an antagonist in 1985 animated show M.A.S.K.
- Bruno von Falk, in the novel Suite Française and the 2015 film of the same name
- Bruno Von Stickle, in Disney's Herbie Goes to Monte Carlo (1977)
- Bruno, a loanshark in the universe of the video game "Mafia II"
- Captain Bruno, a bear and captain of The Submarine Nautilus, in the movie Felix: Ein Hase Weltreise or Felix: All Around The World
- Bruno Carrelli (Earth-616), Kamala Khan's friend in Ms. Marvel Comics and Disney+ Series
- Bruno Jenkins, a character from The Witches.

== Surname ==
=== People ===
- Bruno (surname)

=== Fictional characters ===
- Avilio Bruno, in the anime 91 Days
- Billi Bruno (born 1997), actress
- Giorgio Bruno, in the video game Time Crisis 4
- Bruno Airmont, in Shadow Ticket by Thomas Pynchon

== See also ==
- Saint Bruno (disambiguation)
