= Petronio =

Petronio may refer to:

People:

- Petronio Fancelli (1734–1800), Italian painter
- Petronio Franceschini (1650–1680), Baroque music composer from Bologna
- Petrônio Gontijo (born 1968), Brazilian actor
- Bruno Petronio (1936–2002), Italian Olympic sailor
- Renato Petronio (1891–1976), Italian rower
- Stephen Petronio (born 1956), artistic director, choreographer & dancer in New York City
- Petronio Veroni (1600–1653), Roman Catholic prelate, Bishop of Boiano

Churches:

- San Petronio Basilica, the main church of Bologna, the old città d'arte in the Emilia Romagna region of Italy
- Santi Giovanni Evangelista e Petronio, the national church of the Bolognese on the Via del Mascherone, Rome

Media related to Petronio at Wikimedia Commons
