= Bruno Valdez =

Bruno Valdez may refer to:

- Bruno Valdez (footballer, born 1992), Paraguayan defender
- Bruno Valdez (footballer, born 2002), Argentine centre-back
