= Bruno Moraes =

Bruno Moraes is a given name. It may refer to:

- Bruno Moraes (footballer, born 1984), Brazilian football striker for Canidelo
- Bruno Moraes (footballer, born 1989), Brazilian football forward for Pouso Alegre

== See also ==
- Bruno Morais (born 1998), Brazilian football defender
