= Bruno Andrade =

Bruno Andrade may refer to:

- Bruno Andrade (footballer, born 1989), Brazilian footballer for Dutch club Go Ahead Eagles
- Bruno Andrade (footballer, born 1993), Portuguese footballer who last played for English club Salford City
- Bruno Andrade (racing driver) (born 1991), Brazilian racing driver
- Bruno Lança Andrade (born 1983), Brazilian footballer
- Bruno Andrade de Toledo Nascimento (born 1991), Brazilian footballer for Portuguese club C.D. Feirense
