= Bruno Simões =

Bruno Simões may refer to:

- Bruno Simões (Brazilian footballer) (born 1988), Brazilian football centre-back
- Bruno Simões (Portuguese footballer) (born 1995), Portuguese football midfielder
