= Bruno Gonçalves =

Bruno Gonçalves may refer to:

- Bruno Gonçalves (footballer, born 1994), Brazilian footballer
- Bruno Gonçalves (footballer, born 2003), Brazilian footballer
- Bruno Gonçalves (politician) (born 1996), Portuguese politician
