= Bruno Santos (disambiguation) =

Bruno Santos (born 1987) is a Brazilian mixed martial artist.

Bruno Santos may also refer to:

- Bruno Santos (footballer, born 1983), Brazilian football striker
- Bruno Santos (footballer, born 1987), Brazilian football left-back
- Bruno Santos (footballer, born 1993), Brazilian football right-back
- Bruno Santos (model), Brazilian model, environmental activist and businessman
- Bruno Santos, a boyfriend of Sarah Marie Johnson
