= Bruno Rubess =

Latvian businessman (1926–2009)

- Born: 21 December 1926; Riga, Latvia
- Died: 23 December 2009 (aged 83)
- Occupation: Business executive
- Organizations: Volkswagen Canada, Volkswagen AG, National Bank of Latvia
- Known for: Senior executive at Volkswagen Group

Bruno Rubess (21 December 1926, Riga, Latvia – 23 December 2009) was a Latvian businessman. From his early life in the Latvian Legion (circa 1943/44), he made the transition from the turmoil in Europe to the life of a very successful businessman in Canada. Working his way up from Marketing and Sales to a Senior Executive with Volkswagen Canada and then as Senior Director for Volkswagen AG, Wolfsburg. In 1992, he was appointed to the Board of Governors of the National Bank of Latvia.

Rubess was heavily involved with the Latvian community in Toronto.
