= Bruno Reis (footballer, born 1978) =

Brazilian footballer (born 1978)

Personal information
- Full name: Bruno Reis Lino
- Date of birth: 18 June 1978 (age 48)
- Place of birth: Brazil
- Position: Midfielder

Senior career*
Years	Team	Apps	(Gls)
1996–2001	Fluminense		
2001	Atlético-PR		
2002–2005	Maccabi Tel Aviv		
2005–2006	Académica		
2007	Spartak Vladikavkaz		
2008–2009	Resende		
2010–2011	America-RJ		
2012	Madureira		
- * Club domestic league appearances and goals

Bruno Reis Lino (born 18 June 1978) is a Brazilian football manager and former footballer.

== Youth career ==
As a youth player, Reis joined the youth academy of Brazilian side Fluminense.

== Senior career ==
Reis started his career with Brazilian side Fluminense, where he initially gained media attention due to his performances but then suffered an injury. Besides playing football, he has played footvolley and indoor football for Fluminense.

== Style of play ==
Reis mainly operated as a midfielder and was known for his ball control and dribbling ability.

== Personal life ==
Reis has been friends with Brazil international Romario.
