= Bruno Weber (disambiguation) =

Bruno Weber may refer to:

- Bruno Weber (1931–2011), Swiss artist and architect
  - Bruno Weber Park, a park named after Bruno Weber
- Bruno Weber (doctor) (1915–1956), Nazi German doctor
