= Bruno Carvalho =

Bruno Carvalho may refer to:

- Bruno Carvalho (footballer, born 1974), Brazilian football player, full name Bruno Segadas Vianna Carvalho
- Bruno Carvalho (footballer, born 1986), Portuguese football player, full name Bruno Alexandre Silva Carvalho
- Bruno de Carvalho, president of Sporting CP between 2013 and 2018
