= Bruno Sperani =

Italian writer

Vincenza Beatrice Speraz (1843 in Split – 4 December 1923 in Milan), known by her literary pseudonym Bruno Sperani, was an Italian writer, best remembered for her novels Cesare (1879), L'avvocato Malpieri (1888), Maddalena (1892), Emma Walder (1893), and The Lady of the Regina (1910).
