= Bruno David Roma =

Brazilian footballer (born 1989)

Roma
Personal information
- Full name: Bruno David Roma
- Date of birth: 26 July 1989 (age 37)
- Place of birth: Santo André, Brazil
- Height: 1.77 m (5 ft 10 in)
- Position: Midfielder

Youth career
- ?–2007: Pão de Açúcar

Senior career*
Years	Team	Apps	(Gls)
2007–2009	Helmond Sport	27	(3)
- * Club domestic league appearances and goals

Bruno David Roma (born 26 July 1989) is a Brazilian former professional footballer who played as a midfielder for Dutch club Helmond Sport.

== Career ==
Born in Santo André, Roma moved from Pão de Açúcar to Dutch team Helmond Sport in January 2007, making 26 appearances in the league before leaving in 2009.
