= Bruno De Witte =

Belgian professor and legal scholar

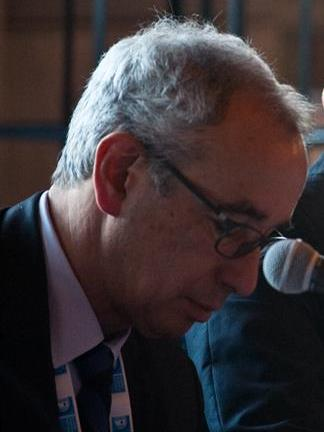
- De Witte (2013)
- Born: 1955 (age 70–71); Kortrijk, Belgium
- Education: University of Leuven; College of Europe; European University Institute (Ph.D.)
- Occupation: Legal scholar
- Employer(s): Maastricht University, European University Institute

Bruno De Witte (born 1955, in Kortrijk) is a Belgian legal scholar. He is Professor of European Union law at Maastricht University, a co-director of the Maastricht Centre for European Law, and part-time Professor at the Robert Schuman Centre of the European University Institute in Florence. He was a full-time Professor of EU Law at the European University Institute from 2000 to 2010, and Professor at Maastricht University from 1989 to 2000.

He graduated in law at the University of Leuven in 1978 and attended the College of Europe in Bruges, Belgium (1978–1979 Paul-Henri Spaak promotion). He obtained a doctorate at the European University Institute in 1985.
