= Bruno Hollnagel =

German politician

Member of the Bundestag
- Incumbent
- Assumed office 24 October 2017

Personal details
- Born: 13 January 1948 (age 78)
- Party: AfD

Bruno Hollnagel (born 13 January 1948) is a German politician (till 2021 Alternative for Germany (AfD)) and, since 2017, a member of the Bundestag.

== Life and politics ==
Hollnagel was born 1948 in the West German city of Hamburg and studied engineering management at the University of Lübeck.

Hollnagel entered the newly founded AfD in 2013. According to Der Spiegel, Hollnagel was one of the party members who joined AfD because of criticism of the federal government's euro rescue policy. He became a member of the Bundestag in 2017. End of June 2021, he resigned from the AfD but remained a member of the Bundestag.
