= Bruno Casanova =

Bruno Casanova may refer to:

- Bruno Casanova (motorcyclist) (born 1964), Italian Grand Prix motorcyclist
- Bruno Casanova (footballer) (born 1984), Argentine footballer
