= Bruno Palazzo =

Argentine professional footballer

Personal information
- Date of birth: 18 November 2000 (age 25)
- Place of birth: La Plata, Argentina
- Height: 1.84 m (6 ft 0 in)
- Position: Centre-back

Team information
- Current team: Nueva Chicago

Youth career
- Everton La Plata
- 2016–2020: Gimnasia LP

Senior career*
| Years | Team | Apps | (Gls) |
| 2020–2024 | Gimnasia LP | 11 | (1) |
| 2022 | → Club Ferro Carril Oeste (General Pico) (loan) | 17 | (2) |
| 2024–2026 | Gimnasia Jujuy | 55 | (2) |
| 2026– | Nueva Chicago | 7 | (0) |
- * Club domestic league appearances and goals as of 17:07, 13 April 2026 (UTC)

Bruno Palazzo (born 18 November 2000) is an Argentine professional footballer who plays as a centre-back for Nueva Chicago.

== Career ==
Palazzo had a spell with Everton La Plata before joining Gimnasia y Esgrima in 2016. He was promoted into their reserve squad in September 2019, featuring in a fixture with River Plate on 27 September. Palazzo made the breakthrough into Gimnasia's first-team in December 2020, initially appearing on the substitute's bench for a defeat to Banfield on 21 December in the Copa de la Liga Profesional. He made his senior debut in that competition on 28 December against Talleres under caretaker managers Mariano Messera and Leandro Martini, subsequently scoring after replacing José Paradela at half-time.

== Career statistics ==
As of 29 December 2020.

Appearances and goals by club, season and competition
| Club | Season | League | | | Cup | | League Cup | | Continental | | Other | | Total | |
| Club | Season | Division | Apps | Goals | Apps | Goals | Apps | Goals | Apps | Goals | Apps | Goals | Apps | Goals |
|---|---|---|---|---|---|---|---|---|---|---|---|---|---|---|
| Gimnasia y Esgrima | 2020–21 (Note: Soccerway counts Copa de la Liga Profesional appearances as league appearances.) | Primera División | 1 | 1 | 0 | 0 | 0 | 0 | — | | 0 | 0 | 1 | 1 |
| Career total | | | 1 | 1 | 0 | 0 | 0 | 0 | — | | 0 | 0 | 1 | 1 |
