= Bruno Morri =

Sammarinese sports shooter

Personal information
- Born: 24 May 1946 (age 80)

Sport
- Sport: Sports shooting

Bruno Morri (born 24 May 1946) is a Sammarinese former sports shooter. He competed at the 1972, 1976, 1980 and the 1984 Summer Olympics.

Outside of sport, Morri worked as a taxi driver.
