= Bruno Ferraris =

Argentine professional footballer

Personal information
- Full name: Rodolfo Bruno Ferraris
- Date of birth: 22 April 1992 (age 34)
- Place of birth: Argentina
- Position: Right-back

Youth career
- Estudiantes

Senior career*
Years	Team	Apps	(Gls)
2014	Agropecuario		
2014	Yupanqui		
2015	Juventud Unida		
2016	Almirante Brown	3	(0)
2016	Deportivo Español	0	(0)
2017–2018	San Miguel	17	(0)
2018–2019	Colegiales	10	(0)
- * Club domestic league appearances and goals

Rodolfo Bruno Ferraris (born 22 April 1992) is an Argentine professional footballer who plays as a right-back.

== Career ==
Ferraris played in the youth of Estudiantes, which preceded a move to Agropecuario. Subsequent stints with Yupanqui and Juventud Unida then occurred. Ferraris agreed terms San Isidro de Lules's Almirante Brown in 2016, making three appearances in Torneo Federal B. He subsequently had a stint with Primera B Metropolitana's Deportivo Español, though didn't appear competitively for the club. In early 2017, Ferraris joined San Miguel in Primera C Metropolitana. Twelve appearances followed in his opening months, as they won promotion to the third tier.

On 30 June 2018, Ferraris completed a move to Colegiales. He departed twelve months later, after featuring ten times.

== Career statistics ==
As of 4 July 2020.

Appearances and goals by club, season and competition
Club	Season	League			Cup		League Cup		Continental		Other		Total	
Club	Season	Division	Apps	Goals	Apps	Goals	Apps	Goals	Apps	Goals	Apps	Goals	Apps	Goals
Almirante Brown	2016	Torneo Federal B	3	0	0	0	—		—		0	0	3	0
Deportivo Español	2016–17	Primera B Metropolitana	0	0	0	0	—		—		0	0	0	0
San Miguel	2016–17	Primera C Metropolitana	12	0	0	0	—		—		0	0	12	0
San Miguel	2017–18	Primera B Metropolitana	5	0	0	0	—		—		0	0	5	0
San Miguel	Total		17	0	0	0	—		—		0	0	17	0
Colegiales	2018–19	Primera B Metropolitana	10	0	0	0	—		—		0	0	10	0
Career total			30	0	0	0	—		—		0	0	30	0
