= Bruno Chaudret =

French chemist

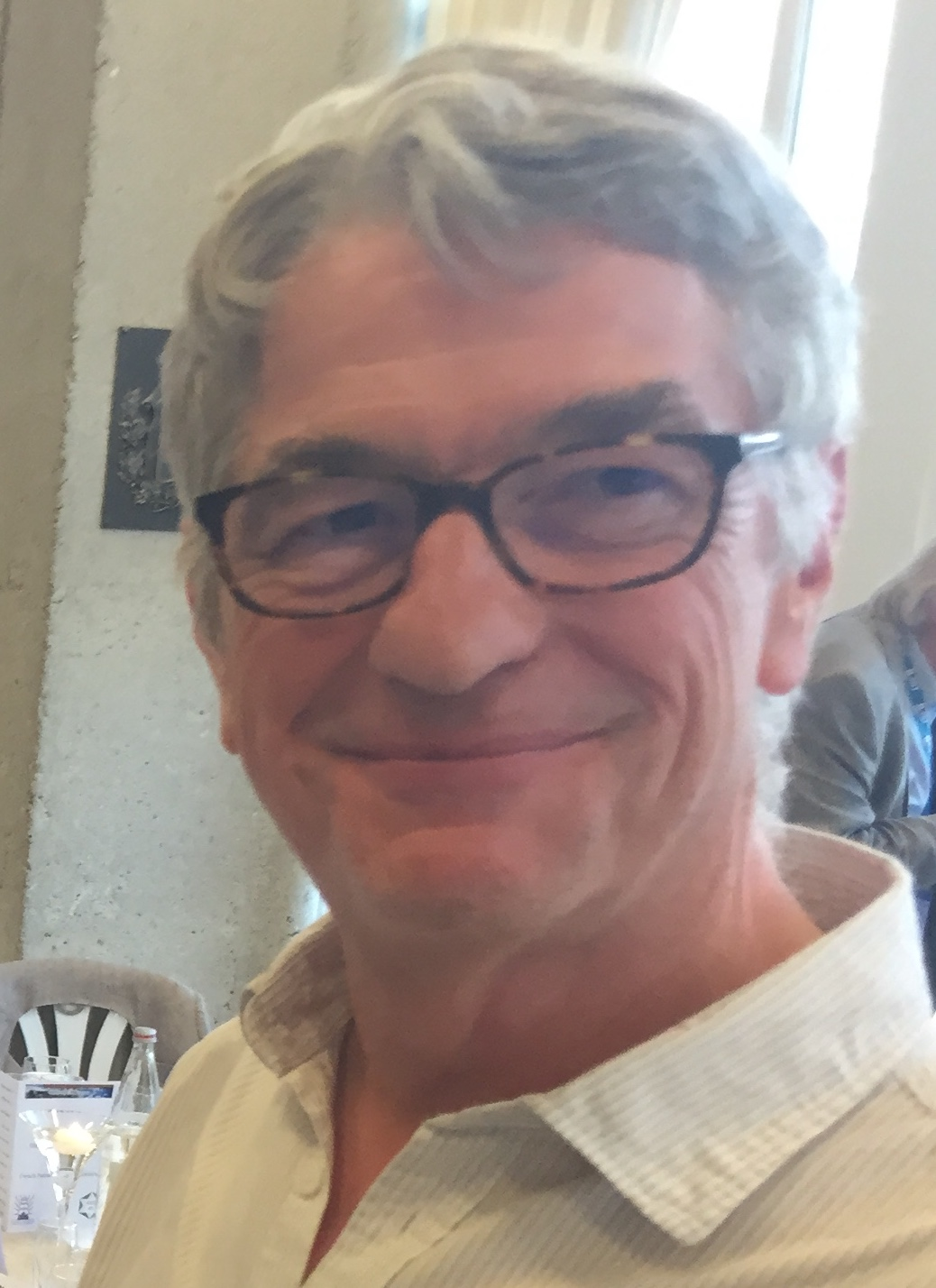
Bruno Chaudret, chemist

Bruno Chaudret, born on 25 December 1953, is a French chemist and director of research at the CNRS. His research is in organometallic chemistry, particularly the interactions between hydrogen and transition metals.

== Biography ==
Chaudret is a graduate of the École Nationale Supérieure de Chimie de Paris (1975). He then completed a PhD. at Imperial College in London (1977) under Sir Geoffrey Wilkinson, and a Ph.D. at the Université Paul Sabatier in Toulouse (1979) under Professor René Poilblanc. He joined the CNRS as a research associate in 1977, and is now Director of Exceptional Class Research at the CNRS and Director of the Laboratory of Physics and Chemistry of Nano-Objects at INSA in Toulouse (UMR 5215 INSA-CNRS-UPS).

== Research ==
Chaudret synthesised the first bis(dihydrogen) complex and demonstrated its high reactivity, particularly for the activation of C-H, Si-H and more generally of poorly reactive bonds. He has also been interested in the spectroscopic properties of these species, in particular the quantum exchange of protons in the coordination sphere of transition metals.

Chaudret developed a method for synthesising large aggregates (from 50 metal atoms to several tens of thousands of atoms). The method has enabled the synthesis of nanoparticles of controlled size, shape, surface and assembly of a wide variety of elements, alloys and semiconductor compounds. Examples include ruthenium nanoparticles, iron nanocubes or cobalt nano-sticks. These particles are of interest in the fields of nanomagnetism, luminescence, electronic transport, and chemical and catalytic reactivity; it has applications in the chemo- and enantioselective labelling of molecules of biological interest and biomolecules as well as, for example, the use of magnetic and catalytic properties on the same object for the storage of renewable energies.

== Honours and awards ==
Chaudret has been a member of the French Academy of Sciences since 2005. and of the Academiae Europaea.

He has received numerous awards, including

- the CNRS Silver Medal (1997),
- the Miguel Catalan Awards (Real Sociedad Espanola de Quimica, 1999),
- Humboldt-Gay-Lussac (2006),
- Geoffrey Wilkinson (Royal Society of Chemistry, 2008),
- Pierre Süe (Société Chimique de France, 2010),
- Paolo Chini (Italian Chemical Company, 2016)
- Wittig-Grignard (Gesellschaft Deutscher Chemiker, 2015)

In 2016, he was awarded a European Research Council (ERC Advanced Grant).

He is a Chevalier of the Ordre of the Légion d'Honneur and of the Ordre des Palmes Académiques.

He also served as President of the Scientific Council of the CNRS (from 2010 to 2018) and President of the Scientific Council of IFPEN (from 2007 to 2011).

== Selected publications ==
B. Chaudret Polyhydrides and Nanoparticles: A 35 year Trip in Organometallic Chemistry Histoire de la Recherche Contemporaine (la Revue pour l'Histoire du CNRS), Tome I, N°2, 2012, pp. 118–125

S. Sabo-Etienne, B. Chaudret, " Chemistry of bis(dihydrogen) ruthenium complexes and of their derivatives ", Coord. Chem. Rev. 1998, 178-180, 381-407

S. Sabo-Etienne, B. Chaudret, "Quantum Mechanical Exchange Coupling in polyhydride and dihydrogen complexes", Chem. Rev.1998, 98, 2077-2091.

K. Philippot, B. Chaudret, " Organometallic Approach to the Synthesis and Surface Reactivity of Noble Metal Nanoparticles", Compte-Rendus Acad Sciences 2003, 6, 1019. DOI: 10.1016/j.crci.2003.07.010

B. Chaudret, "Synthesis and Surface Reactivity of Organometallic Nanoparticles", Surface and Interfacial Organometallic Chemistry and Catalysis in Series: Topics in Organometallic Chemistry, Vol. 16 Coperet, Christope; Chaudret, Bruno (Eds.) 2005, pages 233-260.

B. Chaudret, "Organometallic approach to nanoparticles synthesis and self-organization", C.R. Physique 2005, 6, 117. DOI: 10.1016/j.crhy.2004.11.008

B. Chaudret, K. Philippot, "Organometallic nanoparticles of metals or metal oxides", Oil and Gas Science and Technology (special issue dedicated to Yves Chauvin), 2007, 62, 799. DOI: 10.2516/ogst:2007062

L.M. Martinez-Prieto, B. Chaudret Organometallic Ruthenium Nanoparticles: Synthesis, Surface Chemistry, and Insights into Ligand Coordination. Accounts of Chemical Research 2018, 51, 376.

He has published more than 420 scientific papers and 20 patents.
