= Bruno Salzer =

German entrepreneur

(Franz) Bruno Salzer (13 May 1859 – 28 May 1919) was a German entrepreneur. Salzer was one of the leading entrepreneurs in Chemnitz around the start of the 20th century, and the company he established was the biggest factory in Chemnitz before the Great Depression.

== Life ==
Franz Bruno Salzer was born in Stollberg on 13 May 1859 as the son of stocking knitter Johann Gottlieb Salzer (1817–68) and grandson of Oberschlema innkeeper Ephraim Salzer. In 1880, he moved to Chemnitz, where at first he worked as a locksmith for Wirkmaschinenfabrik Hilscher. After his wedding in 1882 to Marie Anna Unger (1858–1925), he opened up a small workshop in 1883 together with fellow locksmith Carl August Schubert, who had previously worked for Maschinenfabrik Kappel. This workshop produced stocking knitter machines and expanded in 1885 after the success of a new model of Flachwirkwerklen for stockings (named System Paget). 1887 the two fellow entrepreneurs reformed their company into a stock corporation under the name "Chemnitzer Wirkwaren-Maschinenfabrik vormals Schubert & Salzer".

In 1892, Schubert left the ever-expanding company. After Salzer established himself as the sole technical engineer, the company obtained the right to build automatic stocking machines (Rundstrickwerklen in System Standard) and developed the Petinet-Cottongrät, which not only revolutionised the stocking knitter technology in the Ore Mountains, but was exported to numerous manufacturers all over the world. After World War I the company was the world's biggest seller of Flachstrickwerklen, while also experimenting with the production of bicycles and other machinery under the brand "Salzer & Co. GmbH" from 1896 to 1906.

Salzer committed suicide in Chemnitz on 28 May 1919.

== Legacy and tributes ==
- Bruno-Salzer-Straße (since 1997)
