= Bruno Souza =

Bruno Souza may refer to:

- Bruno Souza (architect) (1925–2025), Indian architect
- Bruno Souza (handballer) (born 1977), Brazilian handballer
- Bruno Souza (programmer), Brazilian Java programmer
- Bruno Fernandes de Souza (born 1984), Brazilian footballer
