= Bruno Ballante =

Italian footballer (1906-1977)

Personal information
- Date of birth: 15 April 1906
- Place of birth: Tivoli, Italy
- Date of death: 25 December 1977
- Position: Goalkeeper

Senior career*
Years	Team	Apps	(Gls)
1926–1927	Alba Roma	11	(0)
1927–1930	Roma	70	(0)
1930–1934	Fiorentina	124	(0)
1934–1937	Pisa	83	(0)
- * Club domestic league appearances and goals

Bruno Ballante (15 April 1906 in Tivoli – 25 December 1977) also known as Bruno Ballanti was an Italian football player.

He played 4 seasons (125 games) in the Serie A for A.S. Roma and ACF Fiorentina.

He was the first ever goalkeeper of A.S. Roma when that club was formed.
