= Bruno Trani =

Italian sailor (1928–2022)

Bruno Trani (29 January 1928 – 7 February 2022) was an Italian sailor who competed in the 1960 Summer Olympics. Born in Italy, Trani died on 7 February 2022, at the age of 94.
