= Bruno Prasil =

Canadian volleyball player (born 1950)

Personal information
- National team: Canada
- Born: 12 April 1950 (age 75)

Sport
- Sport: Volleyball

Bruno Prasil (born 12 April 1950) is a Canadian volleyball player born in Czechoslovakia. He competed in the men's tournament at the 1976 Summer Olympics.
