= Bruno Pires =

Bruno Pires may refer to:

- Bruno Pires (cyclist) (born 1981), Portuguese cyclist
- Bruno Pires (footballer) (born 1992), Brazilian footballer

== See also ==
- Bruno Peres (born 1990), Brazilian football right-back
