= Bruno Dettori =

Italian politician (1941–2020)

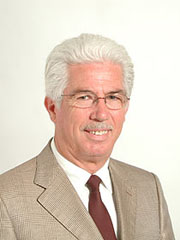
Bruno Dettori

Bruno Dettori (22 December 1941 – 2 August 2020) was an Italian politician.

Dettori was born in Sassari. He graduated in agricultural science and gained experience of teaching abroad for two academic years at the Faculty of Agriculture in Asmara, Eritrea and became the author of 40 publications and research on national and international journals related to geology and hydrology.

He began his political career in 1990, becoming a city councillor in Sassari under the Christian Democrats. He was elected senator at the end of the 2001 general election on 13 May 2001. From 18 May 2006 to 7 May 2008, he was part of the second Prodi government as Secretary for the Environment.
