= Bruno Koagne Tokam =

Cameroonian footballer

Personal information
- Date of birth: 30 December 1978 (age 47)
- Place of birth: Bafoussam, Cameroon
- Height: 1.78 m (5 ft 10 in)
- Position: Midfielder

Senior career*
Years	Team	Apps	(Gls)
1996	RC Bafoussam		
1997	Unisport FC de Bafang		
1998	FC Neftyanik Kubani Goryachiy Klyuch		
1998–1999	Chernomorets Novorossiysk	4	(0)
1999–2000	Alzira	11	(0)
2000–2002	Odivelas		
2003–2004	Blagnac FC		
2004–2005	CO Châlons		
2005–2006	FA Carcassonne Villalbe		
- * Club domestic league appearances and goals

Bruno Koagne Tokam (born 30 December 1978) is a Cameroonian former professional footballer who played as a midfielder.
