= Bruno Lopes =

Bruno Lopes may refer to:

- Bruno Lopes, alias Kool Shen, French rapper and producer
- Bruno Lopes (football manager) (born 1984), Portuguese football manager
- Bruno Lopes (footballer, born 1986), Brazilian football forward
- Bruno Lopes (footballer, born 1995), Brazilian football forward
- Bruno Lopes (footballer, born 2007), Brazilian football forward
