= Bruno Procopio =

Brazilian musician

- Born: 1976; Brazil
- Occupation: Harpsichordist

Bruno Procopio (born 1976, Brazil) is a Brazilian harpsichord player based in Paris.

== History ==
Following early musical studies with Marcelo Fagerlande and Pedro Personne in Rio de Janeiro, Procopio moved to France in 1993. He studied harpsichord at the Conservatoire National Supérieur de Musique de Paris with Christophe Rousset and chamber music with Blandine Ranou and Kenneth Weiss, earning two First Prizes (Premier Prix) in harpsichord performance and continuo playing. After his formal studies, Procopio became one of the few students of Pierre Hantaï.

Procopio's first recording, of JS Bach's Partitas for keyboard numbers 1, 3, and 4, was chosen as one of the five best Baroque music disks of the year by Fanfare magazine in 2004, in addition to a rating of five out of five by the distinguished French magazine Diapason.

In 2007, Procopio founded the record label Paraty Productions, on which he has released two additional albums of JS Bach: Partitas numbers 2, 5, and 6, completing the cycle, and the Sonatas for viola da gamba and keyboard. The latter, which also includes Bach's Italian Concerto, was recently awarded a 'Choc' prize from the magazine Le Monde de la musique.
