= Bruno Santos (footballer, born 1987) =

Brazilian association football player

Personal information
- Full name: Bruno Luiz dos Santos
- Date of birth: 22 November 1987 (age 38)
- Place of birth: Dourados, Brazil
- Height: 1.75 m (5 ft 9 in)
- Position: Left-back

Team information
- Current team: Santo André

Youth career
- 2008–2009: CFZ-RJ

Senior career*
Years	Team	Apps	(Gls)
2010	→ Bangu (loan)	9	(1)
2011–2012	America-RJ	10	(0)
2013–2014	Bangu	42	(1)
2014	→ Macaé (loan)	15	(1)
2015	Macaé	16	(0)
2016	Cuiabá	3	(0)
2017	Tupi	28	(3)
2018	Atlético Goianiense	31	(1)
2019–2021	Brasil de Pelotas	43	(1)
2021–	Santo André	1	(0)
- * Club domestic league appearances and goals as of 13:23, 13 June 2019 (UTC)

Bruno Luiz dos Santos, commonly known as Bruno Santos is a Brazilian footballer who plays as a left-back for Santo André.

He has previously represented Atlético Goianiense in 2018 Campeonato Brasileiro Série B, Macaé in 2015 Campeonato Brasileiro Série B and 2014 Campeonato Brasileiro Série C and Tupi in 2017 Campeonato Brasileiro Série C.
