= Bruno Maximus =

Finnish art painter (born 1970)

Bruno Maximus (born 1970 in Jyväskylä, Finland) is the pseudonym of an anonymous Finnish art painter. He calls his artistic style "hypnorealism", and says it is related to the style of Salvador Dalí in his younger years, albeit without "masochism". The style has been described as "consisting of elements that are realistic by themselves, but which are combined and stretched to create weird and funny surrealistic events, with everything in bright colors and exhibiting a naivistically good mood", surrealistic without "violence", and as "dream-like".

Maximus has lived and worked in Australia, Brazil, England, Portugal, France and Hungary.

In addition to his hundreds of paintings, he is known for his contribution to a book titled Joulupukin lomamatkat (lit. 'Santa's holiday travels') with Sinikka Salokorpi, and designing stamps for the Finnish postal service. In 2020, he also began to restore a Christ themed painting, presumed to have been painted in the 1600s, drawing comments from The Holy See, the Italian Embassy in Finland and Ateneum.

== Sources ==
- Elomaa, Outi (6 April 2021). "Bruno Maximus toi 30 työtään Jyväskylän laajaan näyttelyyn" [Bruno Maximus Brought 30 of His Works to Jyväskylä for a Large Exhibition]. Suur-Jyväskylän Lehti (in Finnish).
- Erkkilä, Eija (11 November 1999). "Bronda takoo Maximuksesta hittiä" [Bronda is Forging Maximus into a Hit]. Iltasanomat (in Finnish).
- Kiuru, Kari (11 January 1995). "Hypnorealistinen Bruno Maximus saa taulunaiheet unista" [Hypnorealistic Bruno Maximus Gets His Ideas for Paintings From Dreams]. Helsingin Sanomat (in Finnish).
- Maunuksela, Arja (27 November 1999). "Bruno Maximus lähetti joulupukin lomalle" [Bruno Maximus Sent Santa on a Vacation]. Helsingin Sanomat (in Finnish).
- "Eukonkanto ja suopotkupallo pääsevät postimerkkeihin" [Wife Carrying and Swamp Football Make it in to Stamps]. Helsingin Sanomat (in Finnish). 24 April 2013.
- Rouhiainen, Anne (28 January 1994). "Taidetta hämärän rajamailta - Rohkeat maalarit tunnelmoivat postfreudilaisessa hengessä" [Art on the Edge of Twilight - Brave Artists Dream in a Post-Freudian Spirit]. Helsingin Sanomat (in Finnish).
- Rouhiainen, Anne (10 May 2001). "Unen ja toden rajalla" [On the Border of Dream and Reality]. Helsingin Sanomat (in Finnish).
- Rouhiainen, Anne (7 March 2002). "Esihistoriallinen jätski ja muita olioita" [Prehistoric Ice Cream and Other Creatures]. Helsingin Sanomat (in Finnish).
- Rouhiainen, Anne (4 March 2004). "Valuvan muodon mestari" [Master of Flowing Shape]. Helsingin Sanomat (in Finnish).
- Tuomas-Kettunen, Jouko (19 June 2017). "Hauet lentävät puutarhassa oliivipuiden katveessa – Bruno Maximus toi huumoria Tuusulaan" [Pike Fly in the Shade of Olive Trees in a Garden - Bruno Maximus Brought Humor to Tuusula]. Keski-Uusimaa (in Finnish).
