= Bruno Riem =

Swiss modern pentathlete

Personal information
- Full name: Bruno Peter Riem
- Born: 19 October 1923 Kiesen, Switzerland
- Died: 19 June 1992 (aged 68) Kiesen, Switzerland

Sport
- Sport: Modern pentathlon

Bruno Peter Riem (19 October 1923 – 19 June 1992) was a Swiss modern pentathlete. He competed at the 1948 Summer Olympics.
