= Bruno Scheid =

Brazilian politician (born 1983)

- Scheid in 2026

Member of the Senate
- Incumbent
- Assumed office 1 February 2027
- Constituency: Rondônia

Personal details
- Born: 13 April 1983 (age 43)
- Party: Liberal Party

Bruno Scheid (born 13 April 1983) is a Brazilian politician who was elected member of the Senate in 2026. He is the vice president of the Liberal Party in Rondônia.
