= Bruno Galland =

French medievalist and archivist

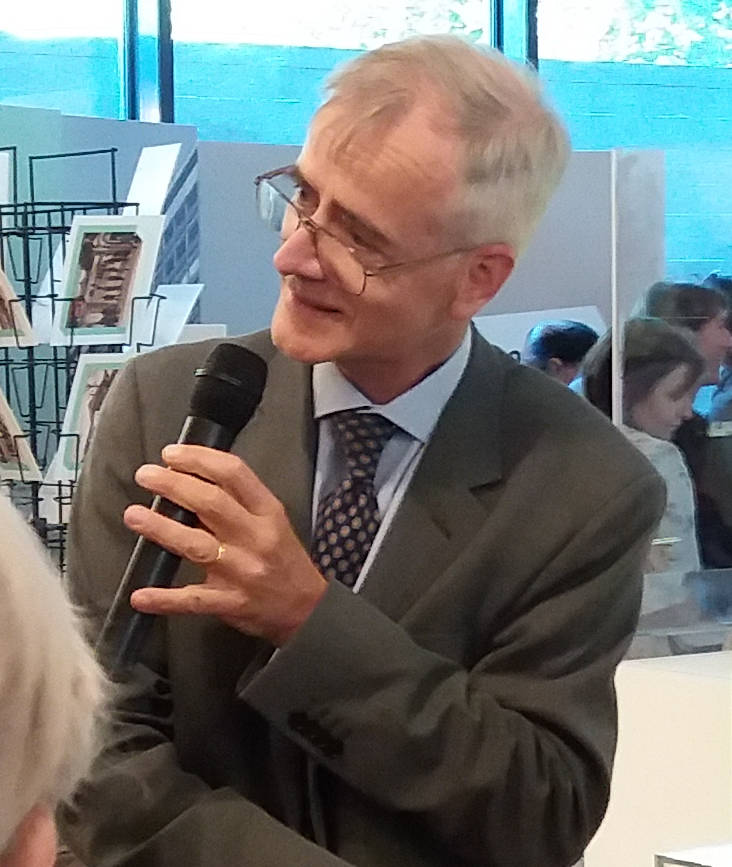
Bruno Galland during the opening of the exhibition La Part-Dieu 800 ans d'histoire.

Bruno Galland (6 March 1964, Lyon) is a French medievalist and archivist.

== Parcours ==
A student at the École nationale des chartes, Galland obtained his archivist-palaeographer diploma in 1987 with a thesis entitled Les archevêques de Lyon de la Bulle d'or aux Philippines. He was a member of the École française de Rome from 1992 to 1995.

A curator at the Archives nationales, he was successively in charge of the ancient section, scientific director of the Paris site and director of public.

He is also associate professor at the Paris-Sorbonne University.

== Published works ==
- 1994 Deux archevêchés entre la France et l'Empire : les archevêques de Lyon et les archevêques de Vienne, du milieu du XIIe au milieu du XIVe, Rome : École française de Rome; diff. de Boccard.
- 1998: Les papes d'Avignon et la maison de Savoie, Rome, École française de Rome; diff. de Boccard.
- 1999: Les instruments de recherche dans les archives (with Christine Nougaret), Documentation française.
- 2004: Les authentiques de reliques du Sancta Sanctorum, Città del Vaticano, Biblioteca apostolica vaticana.
- 2012: Archevêques de Lyon (in collaboration), Lyon : éditions lyonnaises d'art et d'histoire.
- 2014: Philippe Auguste, éditions Belin.
- 2016: Les archives, Presses universitaires de France, (series Que sais-je?)
