= Bruno Goetz =

German-Baltic poet, writer and translator

- Born: 6 November 1885; Riga
- Died: 19 March 1954 (aged 68); Zürich, Switzerland
- Occupations: poet, writer and translator

Bruno Goetz (6 November 1885 – 19 March 1954) was a German-Baltic poet, writer and translator.

Goetz composed two novels. His first novel, Das Reich ohne Raum (The Kingdom without Space), consisted mainly of dream scenes. The protagonist, a wanderer in heroic dress who calls young people to follow him, is recognisable as the wanderer and poet Gusto Gras of Monte Verità. The work was discussed by Carl Jung in his seminars, and written about by Marie-Louise von Franz.
