= Bruno Zimm =

Bruno Zimm may refer to:

- Bruno H. Zimm, American chemist
- Bruno Zimm (artist), American sculptor
