= Bruno Josvah Randrianantenaina =

Malagasy politician

Bruno Josvah Randrianantenaina is a Malagasy politician. A member of the National Assembly of Madagascar, he was elected from the Fampandrosoana Mirindra party; he represents the constituency of Fort Dauphin in the 2007 and 2014 Malagasy parliamentary elections.
