= Bruno Figliola =

Italian field hockey player (born 1938)

Personal information
- Nationality: Italian
- Born: 8 June 1938 (age 87) Cagliari, Italy

Sport
- Sport: Field hockey

Bruno Figliola (born 8 June 1938) is an Italian former field hockey player. He competed in the men's tournament at the 1960 Summer Olympics.
