= Bruno Landi =

Bruno Landi may refer to:

- Bruno Landi (tenor) (1900–1968)
- Bruno Landi (cyclist) (1928–2005)
