= Bruno Audebrand =

French footballer (born 1968)

Personal information
- Full name: Bruno Audebrand
- Date of birth: March 2, 1968 (age 58)
- Place of birth: France
- Height: 1.80 m (5 ft 11 in)
- Position: Defender

Senior career*
Years	Team	Apps	(Gls)
1984–1990	Chamois Niortais	14	(0)
1990–1991	Martigues	15	(0)
1991–1992	Nevers	?	(?)
- * Club domestic league appearances and goals

Bruno Audebrand (born March 2, 1968, in France) is a former professional footballer.
