= Bruno Petrachi =

Italian footballer (born 1997)

Personal information
- Date of birth: 20 January 1997 (age 29)
- Place of birth: Lecce, Italy
- Position: Goalkeeper

Youth career
- 2012–2015: U.S. Lecce

Senior career*
| Years | Team | Apps | (Gls) |
| 2015– | A.C. Monza Brianza 1912 | 3 | (0) |
- * Club domestic league appearances and goals as of 25 December 2015

Bruno Petrachi (born 20 January 1997) is an Italian football goalkeeper playing at A.C. Monza.
