= Bruno Bruni =

Bruno Bruni is the name of:

- Bruno Bruni (artist) (born 1935), Italian artist
- Bruno Bruni (athlete) (born 1955), Italian high jumper
- Bruno Bruni (actor), son of the artist, see The Little Prince (Lost) and This Place Is Death
