= Bruno Amorim =

Bruno Amorim may refer to:

- Bruno Amorim (sailor) (born 1975), Brazilian sailor
- Bruno Amorim (footballer) (born 1998), Portuguese footballer who plays as a forward
