= Bruno Toledo =

Bruno Toledo may refer to:

- Bruno Toledo (runner) (born 1973), Spanish long-distance runner
- Bruno Toledo (footballer) (born 1994), Uruguayan footballer
