= Bruno Sutter =

Bruno Sutter may refer to:

- Bruno Sutter (footballer) (born 1977)
- Bruno Sutter (singer) (born 1979)
  - Bruno Sutter (album)
