= Bruno Merz =

- Born: 23 September 1976 (age 49)
- Origin: Waikato, New Zealand
- Genres: Acoustic, folk
- Occupations: Singer, songwriter
- Instruments: Guitar, piano
- Years active: 2006–present
- Label: Cassiel Lux Records
- Website: BrunoMerz.com

Bruno Merz is a New Zealand musician and singer-songwriter who grew up in New Zealand to Dutch parents. Around the age of 20, he moved to France and then to Amsterdam, where he recorded his first album of demos of songs written during his travels, called Through Darkness into Day. One track from this album, "Nine Sixteen", was chosen as the iTunes/Starbucks pick of the week in 2009.

He recorded his first EP entitled Departing from Crowds in 2009.

A track from this EP, "For You Now", was used in the soundtrack to the Hollywood film Life as We Know It.

Merz currently resides in Peterborough, Canada.

In 2014, he returned temporarily to his homeland of New Zealand to record the full-length album Highways, which was released on 25 October 2014.

Merz is also the co-author and illustrator of the children's book Fins, Fluff and Other Stuff. He has also illustrated numerous other children's books and worked commercially as an animator.

In 2015, he composed the music for a children's ballet for Northern Ballet's production of Tortoise and the Hare,
