= Bruno Oliveira =

Bruno Oliveira may refer to:

- Bruno de Oliveira (born 1990), Brazilian former football forward
- Bruno Oliveira (footballer, born 1993), Brazilian football right-back
- Bruno Oliveira (footballer, born 1998), Brazilian football attacking midfielder
- Bruno (footballer, born 2001), Bruno Conceição de Oliveira, Emirati football winger
