= Bruno Pesce =

Palestinian footballer (born 1979)

Personal information
- Full name: Bruno Pietro Pesce Rojas
- Date of birth: 15 January 1979 (age 47)
- Place of birth: Santiago, Chile
- Height: 1.80 m (5 ft 11 in)
- Position: Defender

Youth career
- Universidad Católica

Senior career*
Years	Team	Apps	(Gls)
2000–2002	Universidad Católica	15	(0)
2001–2002	→ Deportes Puerto Montt (loan)	29	(3)
2002	→ Santiago Morning (loan)	15	(2)
2003	Coquimbo Unido	20	(5)
2004	Rangers	25	(4)
2005–2007	Andria BAT	39	(0)
2007–2008	Brindisi 1912	14	(1)
2008–2009	Pomigliano	20	(1)
2009–2011	Olympia Agnonese	25	(1)
Total		202	(17)

International career
2004–2006	Palestine	5	(0)
- * Club domestic league appearances and goals

Bruno Pietro Pesce Rojas (born 15 January 1979) is a former professional footballer who played as a defender. Born in Chile, he played for the Palestine national team.

== Career ==
Pesce played in Chile for Universidad Católica, Deportes Puerto Montt, Santiago Morning, Coquimbo Unido and Rangers, and in Italy for Andria BAT, Brindisi, Pomigliano and Olympia Agnonese.

== Personal life ==
Pesce is of Italian descent through his father, and Palestinian through his mother.
