= Bruno Sevaistre =

French film director (born 1966)

Bruno Sevaistre (born 22 May 1966 in Paris) is a French film director who focuses on the portraits of artists. For "Fréquenstar," the main emission of M6, he notably signed the large formats in prime time with Jean-Jacques Goldman, Celine Dion and Johnny Hallyday. His technique attracted many record companies who entrusted the direction of "making of" tours or albums of various artists such as Etienne Daho, Julien Clerc and Vanessa Paradis.

In 1998, the FIFA World Cup took place in France. For Canal+, Bruno immersed himself behind the scenes of the competition. After having produced the event documentary "Les yeux dans les Bleus" ("Eye to the Blues"), François Pécheux, Jérôme Caza, Stéphane Meunier and Bruno Sevaistre created the label 2P2L with the help of Gerard Supau. They all met on the Raid Gauloises. Together, they produce the weekly program "C'est ouvert le samedi" "(It's open on Saturday") for Canal+, for which Bruno assembled the reports. A year later, he was editor-in-chief of "Mon NPA", a part of Nulle part ailleurs that gave him an artistic blank-check license on Saturday afternoon live on Canal+ channel.

As artistic Director of 2P2L, Bruno originated many projects that became the hallmark of the company. For three years, he devoted himself to the shooting of the documentary series "À la Clairefontaine" (16 x 26 min), broadcast on Canal+, which retraces the three years of pre-training of young apprentice footballers of the INF Clairefontaine. Among them, Hatem Ben Arfa who plays today in Newcastle, Geoffrey Jourdren, goalkeeper of Montpellier, and also Abou Diaby, a midfielder for Team France and Arsenal in England.
