= Bruno Radicioni =

Italian painter

Bruno Radicioni (10 December 1933 – 17 April 1997) was an Italian painter, sculptor and ceramist, who lived for a decade in Canada.

== Biography ==
He attended the local School of Art in his native town, Fano, then initially dedicated to the pottery in Pesaro, at the Ceramic Art Ferruccio Mengaroni working together with other Italian potters. From 1953 to 1962, he was in Canada and the United States of America, living in Toronto, Montreal and New York City, where he participated in group exhibitions at national and international. He also set personal, Toronto and other Canadian cities and in the same period he was commissioned, by Alitalia, a large panel to be placed within the Montreal International Airport. He returned to Italy, took part in collective and personal exhibitions in various cities in Italy and abroad, such as Rome, Paris, Moscow, New York City, Ingolstadt, Milan, Brescia, Venice, Rimini, Ravenna, Pesaro, Fano, and other. His personal exhibition of painting in Urbino in 1972, the house-museum of Raffaello Sanzio, had special significance. Significant and celebratory, to consecrate Bruno Radicioni was the show at the church of San Domenico, Urbino in the early 1990s. Here, finally, he crystallised his figures in a bald style. Referred to as "Figures in Time", as they were inserted at a later Renaissance painting, to the fullest expression of the figurative element as essential and indispensable for understanding the value of the symbolic figure of Bruno Radicioni. He has collectors in Italy and worldwide. He made drawings and lithographs widely, even in international magazines.
