= Bruno Valdez (footballer, born 2002) =

Argentine professional footballer

Personal information
- Full name: Bruno Adriel Valdez
- Date of birth: 4 January 2002 (age 24)
- Place of birth: San Rafael, Argentina
- Position: Centre-back

Youth career
- Huracán San Rafael
- 2015–2021: Estudiantes

Senior career*
Years	Team	Apps	(Gls)
2021–2023	Estudiantes	7	(0)
2023	→ Deportes Recoleta (loan)	26	(2)
2024	Barnechea	20	(2)
2025	Magallanes	25	(1)

International career
2017	Argentina U15		
2019	Argentina U17		
- * Club domestic league appearances and goals as of 27 January 2026

Bruno Adriel Valdez (born 4 January 2002) is an Argentine professional footballer who plays as a centre-back.

== Club career ==
Valdez signed with the academy of Estudiantes in 2015, penning terms from hometown club Huracán. After progressing through their youth system for the next number of years, he was promoted into their first-team squad in February 2021; making his unofficial bow in a friendly match against Arsenal de Sarandí on 3 February. On 14 February, Valdez made his competitive senior debut during a Copa de la Liga Profesional encounter at home to River Plate, after coming off the bench to replace Martín Cauteruccio at the interval.

In 2023, he was loaned out to Primera B de Chile side Deportes Recoleta. In 2024, he switched to Barnechea.

== International career ==
In 2017, Valdez appeared for Argentina at the South American U-15 Championship in Brazil; a competition they won under the guidance of Diego Placente. In 2019, Valdez was selected on the preliminary squad list by Pablo Aimar for the FIFA U-17 World Cup - though didn't make the final cut.

== Style of play ==
Valdez is primarily a centre-back, though is capable of playing as a midfielder; he also holds experience as an attacking midfielder and as a forward from the early parts of his youth career.

== Career statistics ==
As of 15 February 2021.

Appearances and goals by club, season and competition
Club	Season	League			Cup		League Cup		Continental		Other		Total	
Club	Season	Division	Apps	Goals	Apps	Goals	Apps	Goals	Apps	Goals	Apps	Goals	Apps	Goals
Estudiantes	2021 (Note: Soccerway counts Copa de la Liga Profesional appearances as league appearances.)	Primera División	1	0	0	0	—		—		0	0	1	0
Career total			1	0	0	0	—		—		0	0	1	0

== Honours ==
Argentina U15

- South American U-15 Championship: 2017
