= Bruno Zorzi =

Australian rules footballer (1937–2026)

Personal information
- Full name: Bruno John Zorzi
- Born: 10 December 1937
- Died: 30 January 2026 (aged 88)
- Original team: Fitzroy Under 19s
- Height: 178 cm (5 ft 10 in)
- Weight: 77.5 kg (171 lb)

Playing career
Years	Club	Games (Goals)
1957–58, 1960	Fitzroy	18 (0)

Bruno John Zorzi (10 December 1937 – 30 January 2026) was an Australian rules footballer who played with Fitzroy in the Victorian Football League (VFL). After his initial stint with Fitzroy between 1957 and 1958, he was given a second opportunity in 1960.

Zorzi died on 30 January 2026, at the age of 88.
