= Bruno Pinheiro =

Bruno Pinheiro may refer to:

- Bruno Pinheiro (football manager) (born 1976), Portuguese football manager for Gil Vicente
- Bruno Pinheiro (footballer) (born 1987), Portuguese football centre-back
