= Bruno Capinan =

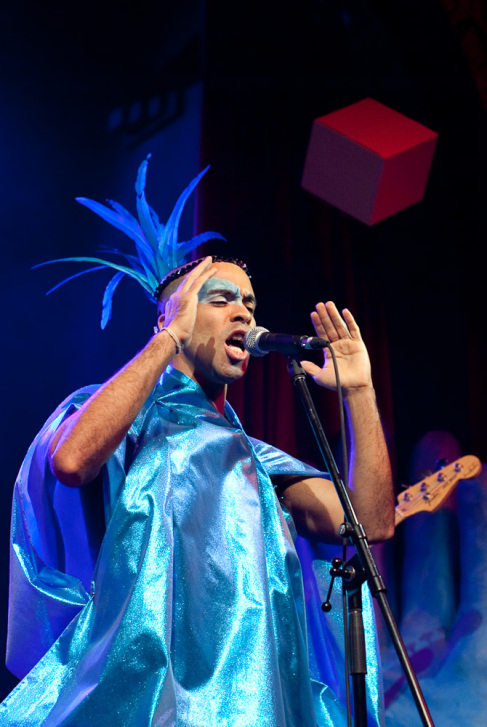
- Bruno Capinan performing at Ibirapuera Auditorium São Paulo

Background information
- Born: 18 October 1984 (age 42)
- Origin: Salvador da Bahia, Bahia, Brazil
- Genres: MPB; world music; bossa nova; folk
- Occupations: Musician, songwriter
- Instruments: Vocals, guitar
- Years active: 2009–present
- Website: www.brunocapinan.com

Bruno Capinan (born 18 October 1984) is a Brazilian-Canadian singer-songwriter. Born and raised in Salvador, Bahia, they currently reside in the city of Toronto, having been naturalised as a Canadian citizen since 2014. They first came to international attention in 2010, with their debut release Gozo. They have released three records, with their latest, 2016's Divina Graça generating widespread recognition, including from British newspaper The Guardian. which described their voice as "acrobatic, sensual, both angelic and profane" and France's Libération calling it a "wickedly beautiful album". In 2017, they began collaborating with Japanese composer Jun Miyake and appeared on his 2018 release Lost Memory Theatre-act 3 as both lyricist and vocalist on the tracks "Pontual" and "Alta Maré".

Their album Real was considered one of the 25 best Brazilian albums of the second half of 2019 by the São Paulo Association of Art Critics.

== Personal life ==
Capinan is non-binary and uses they/them pronouns.

== Discography ==
=== Studio albums ===
- Gozo (2010)
- Tudo Está Dito (2014)
- Divina Graça (2016)
