= Bruno Xavier =

Bruno Xavier may refer to:

- Bruno Xavier (beach soccer) (born 1984), Brazilian beach soccer defender
- Bruno Xavier (footballer) (born 1996), Brazilian football attacking midfielder
