= Bruno Biehler =

German architect (1884–1966)

- Born: 19 July 1884; Freiburg im Breisgau, German Empire
- Died: 24 March 1966 (aged 81); Munich, West Germany
- Occupation: Architect

Bruno Biehler (19 July 1884 – 24 March 1966) was a German architect. His work was part of the architecture event in the art competition at the 1936 Summer Olympics.
