= Bruno Sambo =

French footballer (born 1996)

Personal information
- Date of birth: 24 March 1996 (age 30)
- Place of birth: Clichy-la-Garenne, France
- Height: 1.75 m (5 ft 9 in)
- Position: Right-back

Team information
- Current team: Jura Sud
- Number: 28

Youth career
- 2000–2008: SO Rosny-sous-Bois
- 2009–2011: INF Clairefontaine
- 2009–2015: Boulogne-Billancourt

Senior career*
Years	Team	Apps	(Gls)
2015–2018	Ajaccio B	49	(0)
2017	Ajaccio	3	(0)
2018–2021	Bourges Foot	38	(0)
2021– 2023	Bourges	40	(0)
2021–2023	Bourges B	4	(0)
2024–	Jura Sud	7	(1)
- * Club domestic league appearances and goals as of 30 November 2024

Bruno Sambo (born 24 March 1996) is a French professional footballer who plays as a right-back for Championnat National 1 club Jura Sud.

== Career ==
Sambo made his professional debut for Ajaccio in a 2–0 Ligue 2 win over Bourg-en-Bresse on 29 September 2017. In the summer of 2018, Sambo transferred to Bourges Foot.
