= Bruno Ganem =

Brazilian politician (born 1986)

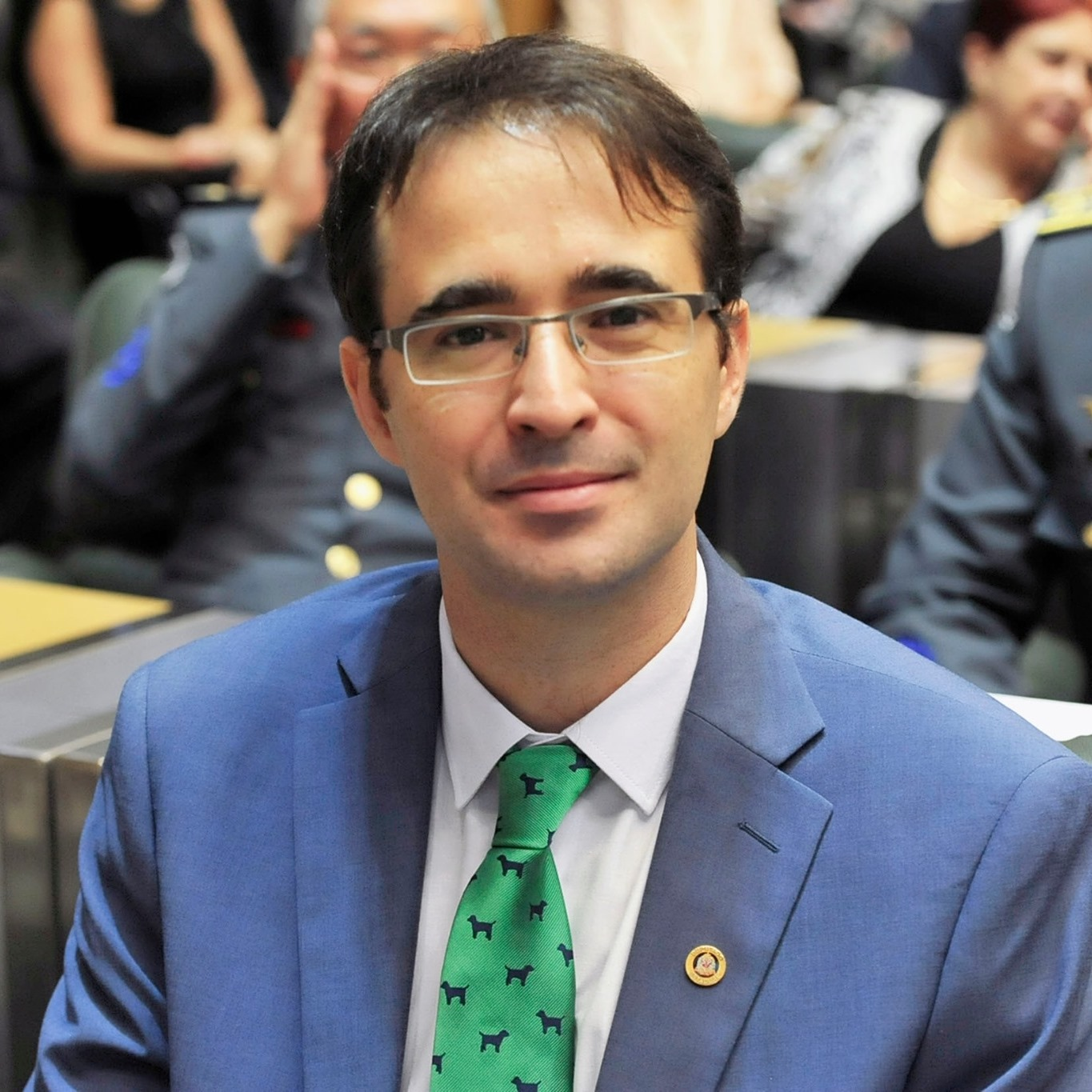
- Ganem in 2022

Member of the Chamber of Deputies
- Incumbent
- Assumed office 1 February 2023
- Constituency: São Paulo

Personal details
- Born: 15 September 1986 (age 39)
- Party: Podemos (since 2017)
- Parent: Clarice Ganem (mother)

Bruno Arevalo Ganem (born 15 September 1986) is a Brazilian politician serving as a member of the Chamber of Deputies since 2023. From 2019 to 2023, he was a member of the Legislative Assembly of São Paulo. He is the son of Clarice Ganem.
