= Bruno Paes =

Bruno Paes may refer to:

- Bruno Paes (footballer) (born 1982), Brazilian footballer
- Bruno Paes (field hockey) (born 1993), Brazilian field hockey player
