= Bruno Lima (politician) =

Brazilian politician (born 1986)

Member of the Chamber of Deputies
- Incumbent
- Assumed office 1 February 2023
- Constituency: São Paulo

Personal details
- Born: 25 August 1986 (age 39)
- Party: Progressistas (since 2022)

Bruno Lima (born 25 August 1986) is a Brazilian politician serving as a member of the Chamber of Deputies since 2023. From 2019 to 2023, he was a member of the Legislative Assembly of São Paulo.
