= Bruno Conti (biologist) =

Italian American biologist

- Occupations: Biologist, professor

Bruno Conti is an Italian American biologist.

== Career ==
Conti specializes in the study of aging and age-related neurodegeneration. He a professor at the San Diego Biomedical Research Institute, an Emeritus Professor at Scripps Research, and an adjunct professor at Stockholm University and at Yale University.

Conti discovered that reducing core body temperature can extend lifespan, independent of calorie intake. His team identified molecules that mediate temperature reduction during calorie restriction and found that three key longevity regulators - body temperature, calorie restriction, and the IGF-1R - are part of the same pathway.

Currently, Conti is working on identifying the genetic and biochemical pathways that mediate the effects of temperature on lifespan. The goal is to find potential targets for creating "temperature mimetics" to treat aging and age-related diseases.
