= Bruno Walliser =

Swiss politician (born 1966)

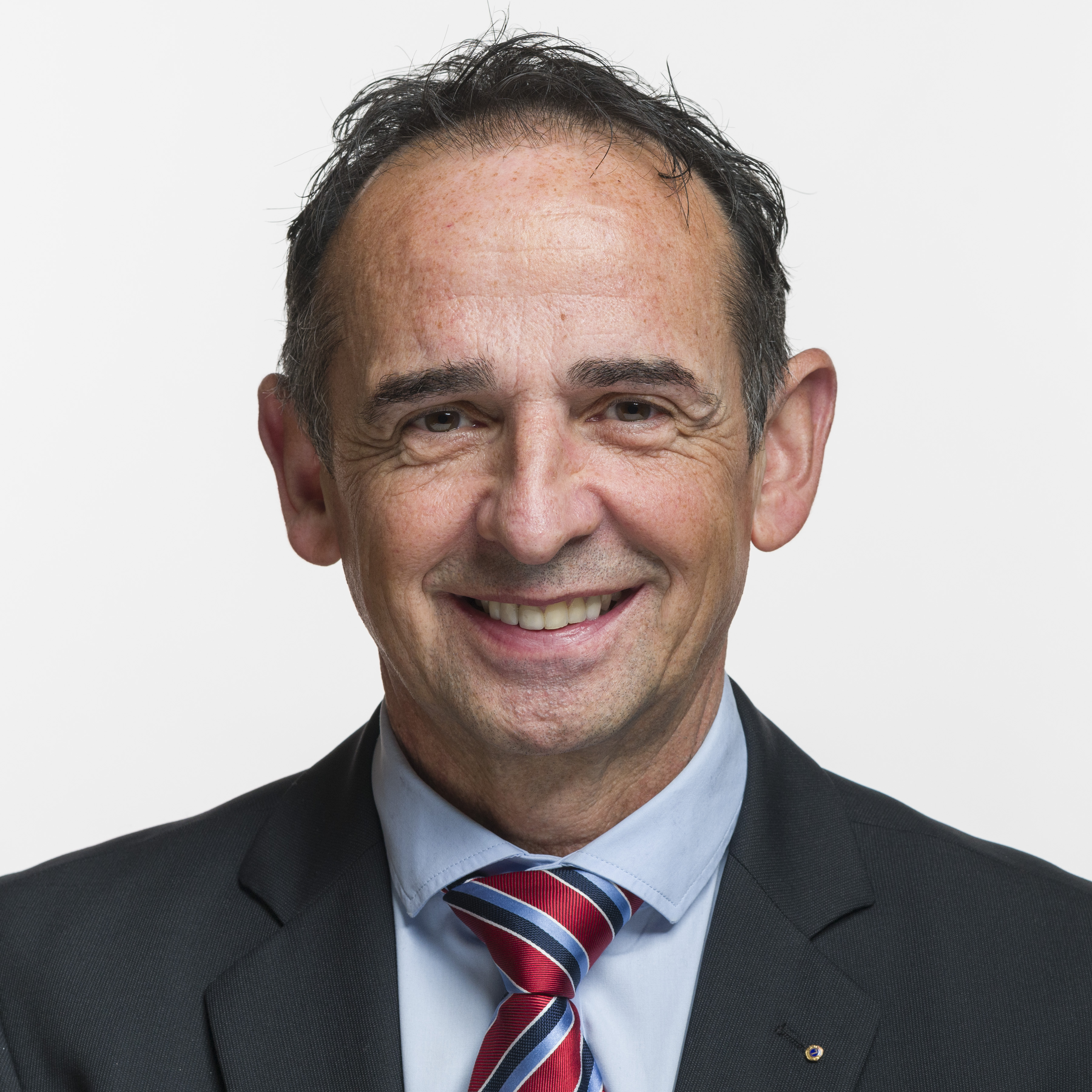
- Official portrait, 2019

Member of the National Council (Switzerland)
- Incumbent
- Assumed office 30 November 2015
- Constituency: Canton of Zürich

Personal details
- Born: Bruno Walliser; 11 April 1966 (age 60) Volketswil, Zürich, Switzerland
- Children: 3
- Occupation: Chimney sweep, businessman and politician
- Website: Official website

Military service
- Allegiance: Switzerland
- Branch/service: Swiss Armed Forces
- Rank: Captain

Bruno Walliser (/wɑːllɪsər/; wall-iss-er born 11 April 1966) is a Swiss chimney sweep, businessman and politician. He currently serves as a member of the National Council (Switzerland) for the Swiss People's Party since 2015. He previously served on the Cantonal Council of Zürich from 1999 to 2016 as well as municipal president of Volketswil.

== Early life and education ==
Walliser was born on 11 April 1966 in Volketswil, Switzerland. He attended the local schools and completed an education to a diploma chimney sweep and as a diplomed firing controller.

== Career ==
He owns the company Bruno Walliser Kaminfeger AG (Bruno Walliser chimney sweep Ltd.) in Volketswil, which employs 10 employees, including apprentices, and specialises in the control and maintenance of wood, oil and gas heating systems. He currently serves as board member and vice president of the board of Bank BSU Uster, a regional bank, board member of the Building Insurance of the Canton of Zürich, board member and vice-chair of the Medical Diagnosis Center Glatt as well as a board member of Bereuter Holding Ltd. Walliser is also involved in several nonprofits and governmental and political organizations and associations.

== Politics ==
Between 1998 and 2002, Walliser served in the legislature of Volketswil (municipal council), and between 2002 and 2017 as president. He was subsequently elected to Cantonal Council of Zürich serving from 1999 to 2016 (from 2013 to 2014 as president). In the 2015 Swiss federal election, Walliser was elected to National Council (Switzerland). There, he serves on the legal commission.

== Personal life ==
Walliser has three children and is currently living in a relationship.
