= Bruno Simões (Portuguese footballer) =

Portuguese footballer

Personal information
- Full name: Bruno Miguel Pinheiro Simões
- Date of birth: 3 September 1995 (age 31)
- Place of birth: Vila Nova de Famalicão, Portugal
- Height: 1.82 m (5 ft 11 1/2 in)
- Position: Midfielder

Team information
- Current team: Oliveirense
- Number: 19

Youth career
- 2003–2007: Futsal
- 2007–2014: Trofense

Senior career*
Years	Team	Apps	(Gls)
2014–2016	Trofense	42	(5)
2016–2017	Salgueiros	13	(2)
2017	Lusitano Vildemoínhos	6	(0)
2017–2018	Benfica e Castelo Branco	29	(5)
2018	Torreense	5	(0)
2018–2020	Leça	40	(4)
2020–2021	Pedras Rubras	16	(1)
2021–2022	Gondomar	19	(1)
2022–2023	AR São Martinho	23	(1)
2023–	Oliveirense	11	(0)
- * Club domestic league appearances and goals as of 21:07, 25 December 2023 (UTC)

Bruno Miguel Pinheiro Simões (born 3 September 1995) is a Portuguese footballer who plays for Oliveirense as a midfielder.

== Football career ==
On 20 August 2014, Simões made his professional debut with Trofense in a 2014–15 Taça da Liga match against Aves.
