= Bruno Geddo =

Italian author and UN official and diplomat

Bruno Geddo (Novara, Italy, 1959) is an author and former United Nations official and diplomat. He served with the United Nations High Commissioner for Refugees (UNHCR) for over 30 years in Sub-Saharan Africa, North Africa and the Middle East.

== Biography ==
A law graduate of the University of Milan, Geddo was first assigned to Sudan as a Junior Protection Officer (JPO) with UNHCR (1988–1991). He covered the Ethiopian refugee crisis in Gedaref Eastern Sudan, before moving on to Khartoum as an Associate Protection Officer. Among other undertakings, Geddo was instrumental in the return to Israel of 180 Falasha refugees who had been stranded in Sudan since 1985 waiting to complete their journey.

Between 1991 and 1993, he was posted to Dar es Salaam, Tanzania, where he organised the return of South African refugees and exiles who had fled the apartheid regime. He also conducted the census of Burundi refugees in camps and spearheaded the humanitarian response to the first inflow of Somali refugees.

In 1994–1996, he served in UNHCR Headquarters, Geneva, as Senior Legal Advisor to the Africa Bureau, covering Eastern Africa and the Horn, the Great Lakes Region and Southern Africa. From 1997 to 2001, Geddo was Assistant Regional Representative (Protection) in Pretoria, South Africa, with responsibility for refugee protection issues in southern Africa (Angola, Botswana, Lesotho, Madagascar, Mozambique, Namibia, Swaziland, Zimbabwe). In South Africa, in particular, Geddo represented UNHCR in the expert panel advising the Department of Home Affairs on the drafting of the 1998 Refugee Act; was instrumental in the department's efforts to scale up capacity to deal with the backlog in asylum claims; and supported the South African Human Rights Commission in the design and implementation of the Roll Back Xenophobia campaign. Geddo spent the subsequent four years back in Geneva as Head of the Legal Advice Unit, Africa Bureau.

In 2005–2008, Geddo served as UNHCR Representative in the Central African Republic, where he led the UNHCR response to the multiple internal displacement crises by setting up the first Protection Cluster in 2006, pursuant to the newly established UN humanitarian coordination system. He also managed the care and maintenance programme for camp-based refugees from the Democratic Republic of Congo; the support programme for urban refugees from Burundi, Rwanda and the Republic of Congo; and the voluntary repatriation operation for Chadian, Congolese and Sudanese refugees.

Geddo also undertook a number of special missions to Darfur, Sudan (internally displaced persons and Chadian refugees) (2005), Limpopo, South Africa (Zimbabwean refugees and migrants) (2008), and Dadaab, Kenya (Somali refugees) (2009), then the largest refugee complex in the world, numbering up to half a million residents in seven camps.

Geddo took over as UNHCR Representative for Somalia in 2009, based in Nairobi and then Mogadishu, leading the UNHCR humanitarian response to multiple internal displacement crises and dealing with large-scale urban refugees in and mixed migration flows out of Puntland and Somaliland, as well as initial planning for return of Somali refugees from Djibouti. Furthermore, he launched an unprecedented local integration programme for internally displaced persons in Galkayo (Central Somalia). The exercise received direct financial support from the UN Peacebuilding fund in view of its political significance. Between 2011 and 2012, within the UN humanitarian coordination system, Geddo managed the UNHCR emergency response to the famine in South-Central Somalia, the worst since 1992.

In 2013, Geddo moved on to Yemen as UNHCR Representative covering multiple refugee and internal displacement situations and a large programme for Ethiopian, Eritrean and Somali refugees in urban areas. He also dealt with the continuing mixed migration crisis from the Horn of Africa to the Arabian Peninsula, in which Yemen was the pivotal transit hub. In this context, Geddo spearheaded preparations for the first international conference on mixed migration in the Gulf, organised by the Yemeni government with the technical support of UNHCR.

Geddo was later appointed as UNHCR Representative to Mauritania (2014–2015), where he dealt with Tuareg and Arab refugees from Mali - including a complex population verification exercise in Mbera camp - and West African refugees based in urban areas. Furthermore, he spearheaded consultations with refugees on the Mali peace process, including discussions on a putative Tripartite Agreement between Mali, Mauritania and UNHCR governing voluntary repatriation, and participation of a refugee delegation from Mauritania in the Mali peace process.

From mid-2015 to 2019, Geddo was Representative to Iraq, leading the UNHCR emergency preparedness and response within the framework of the UN Humanitarian Response Plan.As a result of the rolling military campaign against ISIS, a total of five million internally displaced people were recorded over a four-year period. At the same time, Geddo oversaw the UNHCR operation to support the reintegration of internally displaced families who had started to return to their areas of origin through cash grants, shelter repair and rehabilitation of basic infrastructure. This was complemented by technical support to the Ministry of Home Affairs in the issuance of fresh identity documents to displaced persons who had lost them during the war. In the post-conflict period, Geddo led the sustainable return and social cohesion working groups pursuant to the UN Recovery and Resilience Programme in preparation for the 2018 Iraq reconstruction conference. In parallel, Geddo managed the UNHCR programme to provide protection and assistance to up to 230,000 Syrian refugees in the Kurdistan Region of Iraq, as well as some 20,000 Palestinian refugees in South-Central Iraq.

In 2021, Geddo Published an hybrid memoir: La Strada In Salita (The Uphill Road), chronicling his thirty years on the humanitarian frontlines with UNHCR (published by Albatros Il Filo). The second edition of his book - restructured and updated - was released in 2026 (published by Leonardo Libri) with a foreword by Nello Scavo.
