= Bruno Gomes =

Bruno Gomes may refer to:

- Bruno Gomes (footballer, born 1996), Bruno Gomes de Oliveira Conceição, Brazilian football forward
- Bruno Gomes (footballer, born 2001), Bruno Gomes da Silva Clevelário, Brazilian football midfielder
