= Bruno Meyer (disambiguation) =

Bruno Meyer or Meyere may refer to:

- Bruno Meyer (born 1938), Swiss evangelical fundamentalist
- Bruno Meyer (pilot) (1915–1974), German fighter pilot, recipient of the Knight's Cross of the Iron Cross
- Bruno Meyere, voice actor on Planzet
