= Bruno Saindini =

Malagasy football manager

Bruno Saindini is a Madagascan football manager.

In September 2015, he was named as caretaker coach of the Seychelles national team. He took charge for the 2017 Africa Cup of Nations qualifying game against Ethiopia.
