= Bruno Aguiar =

Bruno Aguiar is a name. People with that name include:

- Bruno Aguiar (Portuguese footballer) (born 1981), Portuguese football midfielder
- Bruno Aguiar (Brazilian footballer) (born 1986), Brazilian football centre-back for Novorizontino
