= Bruno Siciliano =

Bruno Siciliano may refer to:

- Bruno Siciliano (footballer) (born 1938)
- Bruno Siciliano (engineer) (born 1959)
