= Bruno Tiago =

Bruno Tiago may refer to:

- Bruno Tiago (footballer, born 1981), Portuguese football midfielder
- Bruno Tiago (footballer, born 1989), Brazilian football attacking midfielder
