= Bruno Garcia =

Bruno Garcia may refer to:

- Bruno Garcia (actor) (born 1970), Brazilian actor
- Bruno García (politician) (born 1979), Spanish politician
- Bruno García Formoso (born 1974), Spanish futsal coach
