= Bruno Kernen =

Bruno Kernen may refer to:

- Bruno Kernen (born 1961), Swiss alpine skier who won the Kitzbühel downhill race in 1983
- Bruno Kernen (born 1972), world champion Swiss alpine skier
