= Bruno Ierullo =

Canadian fashion designer

Bruno Ierullo is a Canadian fashion designer based in Toronto.

Ierullo's work stems from his belief that style is emotion that can evolve into design. In 2009, he had his first runway show in Toronto, which is featured in the documentary film Material Success. His runways shows have since featured unusually large collections, with an over-200 piece collection displayed at his 2009 and 2011 shows, and an over-300 piece collection shown in 2012 on a 370-foot runway inside an airplane hangar.
