= Bruno Ferreira =

Bruno Ferreira may refer to:

- Bruno Ferreira (footballer, born March 1994), full name Bruno Ferreira Ventura Diniz, Brazilian football goalkeeper
- Bruno Ferreira (footballer, born September 1994), full name Bruno Ferreira dos Santos, Brazilian football defender
- Bruno Ferreira Bonfim, known as Dentinho (born 1989), Brazilian football forward
- Bruno Ferreira Melo, known as Bruno Melo (born 1992), Brazilian football defender
- Bruno Ferreira Mombra Rosa, known as Bruno Mezenga (born 1988), Brazilian football forward
