= Bruno di Girolamo =

Italian clarinetist

Bruno di Girolamo is an Italian clarinetist.

Girolamo studied clarinet at the Conservatorio di Santa Cecilia in Rome. He now teaches at the Conservatorio. He performed with I Virtuosi di Roma under Renato Fasano. He uses a "Wurlitzer Boehm-reformed system" clarinet.

== Discography ==
- Donizetti: Chamber Music, with various artists. Arts, 1997.
