= Bruno Felipe =

Bruno Felipe may refer to:

- Bruno Felipe (archer) (born 1964), French archer
- Bruno Felipe (footballer) (born 1994), Brazilian footballer
