= Bruno Custos =

French footballer (born 1977)

Personal information
- Date of birth: 29 April 1977 (age 49)
- Height: 1.74 m (5 ft 9 in)
- Position: Right-back

Youth career
- CO Saint-Dizier
- Angoulême
- Metz

Senior career*
Years	Team	Apps	(Gls)
2001–2003	Sportfreunde Siegen	64	(2)
2003–2008	SpVgg Unterhaching	84	(1)
2008–2009	Fortuna Düsseldorf	6	(0)
2009–2010	TuRU Düsseldorf		
2010–?	AFC Compiègne		
- * Club domestic league appearances and goals

Bruno Custos (born 29 April 1977) is a French former footballer who played as a right-back. He played for Fortuna Düsseldorf until 2009 and for SpVgg Unterhaching, Sportfreunde Siegen and TuRU Düsseldorf.
