= Bruno Rato =

Brazilian footballer

Personal information
- Full name: Bruno Silva da Costa
- Date of birth: 8 April 1986 (age 40)
- Place of birth: Rio de Janeiro, Brazil
- Height: 1.65 m (5 ft 5 in)
- Position: Forward

Youth career
- 2002–2005: Flamengo

Senior career*
Years	Team	Apps	(Gls)
2006	America-RJ		
2006	Macaé		
2007	America-RJ		
2007–2008	IK Start	9	(1)
2009–2010	Tigres do Brasil		
2011	America-RJ		
2011–2013	Mesquita		
2014	Operário Ferroviário		
2015	America-RJ		
2018	Nova Cidade		
- * Club domestic league appearances and goals

Bruno Silva da Costa (born 8 April 1986), better known as Bruno Rato, is a Brazilian former professional footballer who played as a forward.

== Career ==
Trained in Flamengo's youth sectors, Bruno Rato stood out professionally playing for America-RJ In 2007, he was involved in a 1 million dollar transaction alongside Ygor for Norway's IK Start. The club came to Brazil to compete in the Copa Pelegrino friendly tournament against teams from Rio de Janeiro, counting on Rato. In February 2008, the player was temporarily removed for the first time. In August 2008, the athlete terminated his contract due to adaptation problems.

The athlete returned to Brazil but continued to have problems maintaining his physical shape. He ended his career in 2018, being part of the champion squad of the third division in Rio de Janeiro with Nova Cidade.

== Honours ==
Nova Cidade

- Campeonato Carioca Série B1: 2018
