= Bruno Chérier =

French painter (1817–1880)

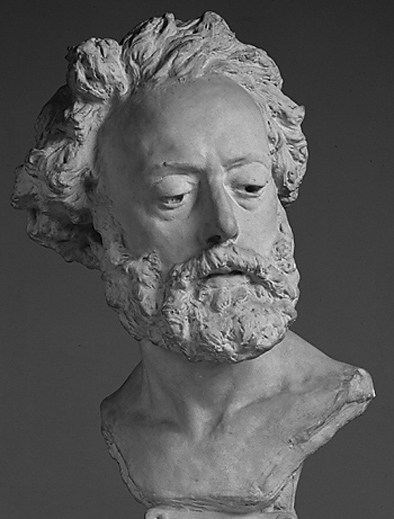
Bust of Chérier by Carpeaux

Bruno Joseph Chérier (10 August 1817 – 24 October 1880) was a French decorative painter. Born in Valenciennes, he studied under Jean-Baptiste Carpeaux, for whom he also modelled. He died in the 14th arrondissement of Paris.

== Works ==
=== Lille ===
- Église Saint-Sauveur - Stations of the Cross
- Église Saint-Martin d'Esquermes - paintings for the altar of the Virgin Mary
- Église Notre-Dame-de-Fives - four canvases in the choir

=== Tourcoing ===
- Église Saint-Christophe- altarpieces
- Église Saint-Jacques - two stained glass windows

=== Other ===
- Notre-Dame des Anges - Tourcoing - Stations of the Cross, stained glass, ornamental paintings
- Church (now demolished) - Monchy-le-Preux - stained glass and sculptures
- Notre-Dame de Grâce - Loos - painting in the nave
- Church - Haussy - Stations of the Cross

== Sources ==
- "In Situ - Revue des patrimoines". revue.inventaire.culture.gouv.fr.
