= Bruno Finesi =

Italian footballer (1909-1972)

Personal information
- Date of birth: 25 April 1909
- Place of birth: Rome, Italy
- Date of death: 7 July 1972
- Place of death: Rome, Italy
- Position: Midfielder

Senior career*
| Years | Team | Apps | (Gls) |
| 1924–1927 | Lazio | 2 | (0) |
| 1929–1930 | Roma | 1 | (0) |
| 1931–1932 | Orvietana | | |
- * Club domestic league appearances and goals

Bruno Finesi (25 April 1909 – 7 July 1972) was an Italian professional football player.

He played one game in 1924/25 and one game in 1925/26 for S.S. Lazio, and one game in the 1929/30 Serie A season for A.S. Roma.
