= Bruno Santon =

Italian footballer (1942–2023)

Personal information
- Date of birth: 25 June 1942
- Place of birth: Marghera, Italy
- Date of death: 15 December 2023 (aged 81)
- Place of death: Livorno, Italy
- Height: 1.77 m (5 ft 10 in)
- Position: Midfielder

Senior career*
| Years | Team | Apps | (Gls) |
| 1959–1962 | Venezia | 29 | (7) |
| 1962–1963 | Cagliari | 19 | (1) |
| 1963–1965 | Venezia | 57 | (16) |
| 1965–1966 | Mantova | 20 | (4) |
| 1966–1971 | Livorno | 85 | (24) |
| 1971–1972 | Lucchese | 21 | (0) |
| Total | | 231 | (52) |
- * Club domestic league appearances and goals

Bruno Santon (25 June 1942 – 15 December 2023) was an Italian footballer who played as a midfielder.

== Career ==
Santon played for Livorno, scoring 24 goals in 85 appearances in Serie B. Born in Marghera, he also played for Venezia, Cagliari, Mantova and Lucchese.

== Personal life and death ==
His wife, with whom he had two children, was from Livorno and he remained in the city after he retired from playing, where he worked at a petrol station. Santon died on 15 December 2023, at the age of 81.
