= Bruno Jenkins =

Bruno Jenkins is the name of the following fictional characters:

- Bruno Jenkins, in Casualty
- Bruno Jenkins, in Roald Dahl's book The Witches
