= Bruno Fernandes (disambiguation) =

Bruno Fernandes (Bruno Miguel Borges Fernandes, born 1994) is a Portuguese football midfielder.

Bruno Fernandes may also refer to:

- Bruno Fernandes (footballer, born 1974) (Bruno Marcelo Pereira Fernandes), former Portuguese football midfielder
- Bruno Fernandes (footballer, born 1978) (Bruno João Nandingna Borges Fernandes), former Bissau-Guinean football defender
- Bruno F. Fernandes (born 1978), Brazilian ophthalmologist and martial arts teacher
- Bruno (footballer, born 1984) (Bruno Fernandes das Dores de Souza), Brazilian football goalkeeper and convicted murderer
- Bruno Fernando (born 1998), Angolan basketball player
- Bruno Fernandes (footballer, born 2006) (Bruno Henrique Vilela De Carvalho), Portuguese football midfielder
