= Bruno Petronio =

Italian sailor

Bruno Petronio (30 January 1936 – 6 November 2002) was an Italian sailor who competed in the 1964 Summer Olympics.
