= Bruno Gonçalves (footballer, born 1994) =

Brazilian footballer

Personal information
- Full name: Bruno Gonçalves Kischinhevsky
- Date of birth: 9 August 1994 (age 32)
- Place of birth: Rio de Janeiro, Brazil
- Height: 1.85 m (6 ft 1 in)
- Position: Midfielder

Senior career*
| Years | Team | Apps | (Gls) |
| 2014–2017 | Madureira | 18 | (1) |
| 2017 | FC Dordrecht | 1 | (0) |
- * Club domestic league appearances and goals as of 15 September 2017

Bruno Gonçalves Kischinhevsky, sometimes known as just Bruno (born 9 August 1994) is a Brazilian football player of Israeli descent. He last played for FC Dordrecht.

== Club career ==
He made his Eerste Divisie debut for FC Dordrecht on 18 August 2017 in a game against Fortuna Sittard.
