= Bruno Morais =

Portuguese footballer

Personal information
- Full name: Bruno Miguel Araújo Morais
- Date of birth: 8 April 1998 (age 28)
- Place of birth: Vila Nova de Famalicão, Portugal
- Height: 1.89 m (6 ft 2 in)
- Position: Centre-back

Team information
- Current team: São João de Ver
- Number: 4

Youth career
- 2006–2008: Operário FC
- 2008–2011: Vitória
- 2011–2012: Os Sandinenses
- 2012–2015: Famalicão
- 2015–2016: Boavista
- 2016–2017: Gil Vicente

Senior career*
Years	Team	Apps	(Gls)
2017–2019	Gil Vicente	33	(0)
2017–2018	→ Montalegre (loan)	23	(0)
2019–2020	Aves	15	(0)
2020–2021	Granada B	11	(0)
2021–2022	Montalegre	22	(1)
2022–2023	Anadia	26	(3)
2023–2024	Lusitânia	13	(0)
2024–2025	Fafe	12	(0)
2025–	São João de Ver	23	(1)
- * Club domestic league appearances and goals as of 7 May 2026

Bruno Miguel Araújo Morais (born 8 April 1998) is a Portuguese professional footballer who plays as a centre-back for Liga 3 club São João de Ver.

== Career ==
Morais made his Primeira Liga debut for Aves, in a 1–0 win over Braga on 7 December 2019.
