= Bruno Lança =

Brazilian footballer (born 1983)

Personal information
- Full name: Bruno Lança de Andrade
- Date of birth: February 18, 1983 (age 43)
- Place of birth: São Paulo, Brazil
- Height: 1.84 m (6 ft 0 in)
- Position: Defensive midfielder

Senior career*
Years	Team	Apps	(Gls)
2002–2006	Atlético Paranaense		
2005	→ Juventude (loan)	7	(1)
2005–2006	→ Reggina (loan)	1	(0)
2006	→ Santa Cruz (loan)	11	(1)
2007	Wuhan		
2008	Mirassol		
2009	Noroeste		
2009	Linense		
2010	Paysandu		
2010	Mixto		
2011–2012	Volta Redonda		
2012	Ferroviária		
- * Club domestic league appearances and goals

Bruno Lança de Andrade (born February 18, 1983) is a Brazilian former footballer.

== Career ==
An Atlético Paranaense youth product, he signed a new two-year contract for Paranaense in March 2005. On 31 August 2005, he left for Reggina. Bruno returned to Brazil for Santa Cruz of Campeonato Brasileiro Série A. In February 2007, he left for Wuhan of Chinese Super League, and played as 布鲁诺.

On 22 February 2008, he signed a contract until the end of Campeonato Paulista for Mirassol.
