= Deaths in June 1980 =

The following is a list of notable deaths in June 1980.

Entries for each day are listed alphabetically by surname. A typical entry lists information in the following sequence:

- Name, age, country of citizenship at birth, subsequent country of citizenship (if applicable), reason for notability, cause of death (if known), and reference.

== June 1980 ==
=== 1 ===
- Murtada Said Abdel Baki al-Hadithi, 38–39, Iraqi politician and diplomat, assassination.
- Luther E. Barnhardt, 76, American politician, lieutenant governor of North Carolina (1957–1961).
- Gerardo Caballero, 89, Spanish general.
- Gaston-François de Witte, 82, Belgian herpetologist.
- Julian Deryl Hart, 85, American academic administrator.
- John Jenkins, 44, Australian footballer.
- John MacDonald, 89, Scottish rugby player.
- Rube Marquard, 93, American baseball player.
- George Marsden, 68, English boxer.
- Aaron Manasses McMillan, 84, American medical missionary and politician, member of the Nebraska Legislature (1929–1930).
- Arthur Nielsen, 82, American businessman (Nielsen Media Research) and electrical engineer.
- Ninetta May Runnals, 95, American academic administrator.
- Billy Stamps, 68, American football player and coach.
- Viktor Starčić, 79, Yugoslav Serbian actor.
- Ingvald Svinsås-Lo, 82, Norwegian politician.
- Hank Swasey, 87, American baseball player and coach.
- Len Wickwar, 69, British boxer.

=== 2 ===
- Frank Coe, 73, American government official and alleged double agent.
- Norman Hardy, 72, English cricketer.
- Robert H. McDowell, 86, American intelligence officer and historian.
- Vasja Pirc, 72, Yugoslav chess player.
- Joseph Samachson, 73, American chemist and science fiction writer, complications from Parkinson's disease.

=== 3 ===
- Naum Akhiezer, 79, Soviet mathematician.
- Fred Beir, 52, American actor, cancer.
- Lily Butters, 86, Canadian disability activist.
- Oliver Harms, 78, American Lutheran leader.
- Preston Holder, 72, American archaeologist and photographer, cancer.
- Fred Lieb, 92, American sportswriter and baseball historian.
- Monica Milne, 62, British civil servant.
- Jack Murrell, 78, Australian footballer.
- Hugh Wrigley, 88, Australian soldier.

=== 4 ===
- Léonard Bron, 82, Swiss Olympic wrestler (1920).
- Arnold Gartmann, 75, Swiss Olympic bobsledder (1936).
- Delfín Jaranilla, 96, Filipino jurist, attorney general (1927–1932).
- Leopold Kielholz, 68, Swiss footballer.
- Charles Miller, 41, American saxophonist (War) and singer ("Low Rider"), stabbed.
- Fred Rodell, 73, American legal scholar.
- Gloria Saunders, 52, American actress.
- Don Tarr, 70, Welsh rugby player and naval officer.

=== 5 ===
- Giorgio Amendola, 72, Italian politician and writer, MEP (since 1979).
- Marian Babirecki, 47, Polish Olympic equestrian (1960), drowned.
- Ron Davies, 60, Australian politician, MP (1958–1975), heart attack.
- Margret Dünser, 53, Austrian journalist.
- Johnny Jones, 87, American baseball player and manager.
- Thorsten V. Kalijarvi, 82, American diplomat.
- Jimmie Keenan, 81, American baseball player.
- Lauritz Lauritzen, 70, German politician.
- William Seagrove, 81, British Olympic runner (1920, 1924).
- John Turnley, 44–45, Irish politician and activist, shot.

=== 6 ===
- Ruth Aarons, 61, American table tennis player and talent manager, fall.
- Laurie Apitz, 74, American football player and coach.
- Phillip Connell, 79, Australian politician.
- Gualtiero De Angelis, 80, Italian actor and dubber.
- Mick Flynn, 30, Australian rugby player, brain cancer.
- John Dove Isaacs, 67, American oceanographer, cancer.
- Saboo, c. 62–63, Indian footballer.
- William Francis Kynaston Thompson, 70, British journalist and soldier.

=== 7 ===
- Richard Bonelli, 91, American opera singer.
- Gunnar Bråthen, 83, Norwegian politician and trade unionist.
- Elizabeth Craig, 97, Scottish journalist and cookbook author.
- Idwal Davies, 80, Welsh footballer.
- Lillian Dean, 81, Australian politician and photographer.
- Salvator Gotta, 93, Italian writer.
- Philip Guston, 66, Canadian-born American painter, heart attack.
- Gustav Hentschel, 83, American Olympic cyclist (1924).
- Henry Miller, 88, American novelist (Tropic of Cancer), heart failure.
- Adalgisa Nery, 74, Brazilian journalist, poet and politician.
- Sir Charles Orde, 95, British diplomat.
- Tom Pickett, 73, American politician, member of the U.S. House of Representatives (1945–1952).
- Marian Spychalski, 73, Polish politician, head of state (1968–1970).

=== 8 ===
- Guus Albregts, 79, Dutch politician and economist.
- Brilhante, 75, Brazilian footballer.
- Ernst Busch, 80, German singer and actor.
- Graham Delbridge, 63, Australian Anglican prelate, traffic collision.
- Bob Hoskins, 34, American football player, heart attack.
- Majid Kalakani, 40–41, Afghan politician, executed.
- Mary Meillon, 60, Australian politician.
- Síle Ní Chinnéide, 79, Irish historian.
- Greta Schröder, 87, German actress (Nosferatu).
- Helen S. Willard, 86, American occupational therapist and writer.

=== 9 ===
- Miguel Capuccini, 76, Uruguayan footballer.
- Virgilio N. Cordero Jr., 87, Puerto Rican general.
- Dharmsinh Desai, 63, Indian politician, MP (1971–1977).
- Sir Derrick Dunlop, 78, Scottish physician and pharmacologist.
- Odell Hale, 71, American baseball player, complications from a stroke.
- Shyam Kumari Khan, 75, Indian politician and lawyer.
- Louis de Loczy, 89, Hungarian-Brazilian geologist.
- Patrick J. McDonough, 69, American politician, member of the Massachusetts House of Representatives (1941–1947), cancer.
- Cvjetko Popović, 84, Bosnian militant involved in the assassination of Archduke Franz Ferdinand.
- Llewellyn Ivor Price, 74, Brazilian paleontologist.
- Keith Whitehead, 48, Australian Olympic water polo player (1956, 1960).
- Carmelo Zito, 80, Italian-American journalist.

=== 10 ===
- Edmond Brazès, 86–87, French writer.
- Antonio Cetti, 80, Italian footballer.
- Floyd Ebaugh, 66, American basketball player.
- Denis Hanley, 76, British politician, MP (1931–1935).
- Joseph Graeme Humble, 66, British haematologist, leukemia.
- Lubomír Linhart, 73, Czech film historian and critic.
- John McDowell, 85, Canadian politician.
- Heinrich Schrader, 86, Australian cricketer and footballer.
- Aloysius Michael Sullivan, 83, American poet.
- Charles Young, 74, Australian footballer.

=== 11 ===
- Wolfgang Ehrl, 68, German Olympic wrestler (1932, 1936).
- William J. E. Jessop, 77, Irish politician and academic.
- Eino Kujanpää, 76, Finnish politician.
- Şäyxi Mannur, 75, Soviet poet, journalist and translator.
- Rube Marshall, 89, American baseball player.
- Frank Murphy, 90, American Olympic pole vaulter (1912).
- Noel Pharazyn, 86, New Zealand trade unionist.
- Ángel Sanz Briz, 69, Spanish diplomat and humanitarian.
- Michal Schmuck, 71, Czechoslovak Olympic water polo player (1928, 1936).
- Andrew P. Torrence, 59, American academic administrator.
- Bolesław Woytowicz, 80, Polish pianist and composer.

=== 12 ===
- Lawrence Anionwu, 59, Nigerian diplomat, stroke.
- Gerónimo Arnedo Álvarez, 82, Argentine politician.
- Sir Billy Butlin, 80, British holiday camp entrepreneur, pneumonia.
- Sjraar Cuijpers, 78, Dutch architect.
- James A. FitzPatrick, 86, American journalist, film producer and narrator.
- Ernie Godfrey, 88, American football player and coach, heart attack.
- Jim Kennedy, 71, Australian footballer.
- Stu Martin, 42, American jazz drummer, heart attack.
- Masayoshi Ōhira, 70, Japanese politician, prime minister (since 1978), heart attack.
- Egon Pearson, 84, British statistician.
- Carl Ivar Ståhle, 66, Swedish linguist.
- Milburn Stone, 75, American actor (Gunsmoke), heart attack.
- Danny Thomas, 29, American baseball player, suicide by hanging.
- Victoria Vinton, 67, American actress, suicide.
- Fannie C. Williams, 98, American educator.

=== 13 ===
- Maryla Falk, 73, Polish Indologist and religious scholar.
- Caetano Xavier Furtado, 82, Indian botanist.
- Rex Grossman Sr., 56, American football player.
- Dudley Helfrich, 68, South African cricketer.
- Eric Howroyd, 80, Australian politician.
- Frederik Koopman, 92, Dutch Olympic rower (1920).
- Herbert Lee, 93, British Olympic racing cyclist (1920, 1924).
- Julio Londoño Londoño, 79, Colombian historian and general.
- Nicolae Mărgineanu, 74, Romanian psychologist.
- William A. Patterson, 80, American airline executive (United Airlines).
- Ludwig Raiser, 75, German legal scholar.
- Walter Rodney, 38, Guyanese political activist and historian, assassination by bomb.
- Bill Sewell, 79, Australian politician.
- Paul Althaus Smith, 80, American mathematician.

=== 14 ===
- Herman Autrey, 75, American jazz trumpeter.
- Bernard Jacob Bamberger, 76, American rabbi and theologian, heart attack.
- James Blue, 49, American filmmaker, cancer.
- Andrew Donaldson, 93, Scottish footballer.
- Yahya El Mashad, 48, Egyptian nuclear scientist, assassinated.
- Johnny Hodapp, 74, American baseball player.
- Francis MacCarthy Willis Bund, 75, British Anglican prelate and academic administrator.
- Stanley Marshall, 53, American football player and coach.
- Ike Owens, 60, American football player.
- Jim Paltridge, 88, English footballer.
- Gladwell Richardson, 76, American novelist.
- Cosma Spessotto, 57, Italian Roman Catholic prelate, shot.

=== 15 ===
- Lettie Allen, 78, New Zealand public servant and politician.
- Ivan L. Bennett, 88, American general and army chaplain.
- Fred Bohanan, 72, American film editor (Giant).
- John Rood Cunningham, 88, American academic administrator.
- Chick Farr, 66, British footballer.
- Ehrhardt Heller, 70, Canadian ice hockey player.
- George Hurdalek, 72, German screenwriter (The Trapp Family).
- Wilfred Judson, 77, Canadian jurist.
- Jocelyn Lee, 77, American actress.
- James Leslie, 71, Scottish footballer.
- Omer Mahy, 84, Belgian racing cyclist.
- Sergio Pignedoli, 70, Italian Roman Catholic cardinal, pulmonary embolism.

=== 16 ===
- Henri Catelan, 84, French racing cyclist.
- Leontios Chatziapostolou, 85–86, Greek politician and lawyer.
- Tillie Ehringhaus, 89, American civic leader, first lady of North Carolina (1933–1937).
- Benoît Faure, 81, French racing cyclist.
- Feliks Góralczyk, 30, Polish ice hockey player.
- Bob Nolan, 72, Canadian-born American singer, songwriter ("Cool Water", "Tumbling Tumbleweeds") and actor, heart attack.
- Arthur R. Penfold, 89, Australian chemist.
- John Simpson, 73, New Zealand cricketer.
- Jacob Talmon, 64, Polish-born Israeli historian, complications from heart surgery.
- Al Zupek, 58, American football player.

=== 17 ===
- Lázaro Francisco, 82, Filipino novelist and playwright.
- Sue K. Hicks, 84, American jurist (Scopes trial), possible inspiration for "A Boy Named Sue".
- Anton Husgafvel, 79, Finnish Olympic sprinter (1924).
- Furio Jesi, 39, Italian historian and archaeologist, carbon monoxide poisoning.
- Pavel Keller, 97, Russian naval officer.
- Kathryn Dyakanoff Seller, 95, American educator.
- Andrey Shebalkov, 58, Soviet soldier.
- Jaiwant Singhji Vaghela, 76, Indian maharana, composer, and musicologist.

=== 18 ===
- Chinna Annamalai, 60, Indian writer, film producer, and politician.
- Henry Aurand, 86, American general.
- Cliff Bergere, 83, American racing driver and stuntman.
- Sir Maurice Bridgeman, 76, English oil executive (BP).
- Doris Davenport, 63, American actress.
- Roy Faville, 71, British RAF officer.
- Terence Fisher, 76, British film director (Dracula, The Curse of the Werewolf, The Curse of Frankenstein).
- Neville George, 76, Welsh geologist.
- Jules Goldstone, 80, American attorney.
- Robert Hoernschemeyer, 54, American football player, cancer.
- Barnaby Keeney, 65, American academic administrator, stroke.
- Kazimierz Kuratowski, 84, Polish mathematician.
- André Leducq, 76, French racing cyclist and Olympic champion (1924).
- Lilian G. Lutter, 81, British-Indian educationist.
- George Fuller Miller Sr., 77, American scouting organization executive (Boy Scouts of America).
- Kazimierz Paszkiewicz, 45, Polish Olympic pentathlete (1960).
- Olivia Sophie L'Ange Shipp, 100, American violinist.
- Polly Smith, 71, American photographer, cancer.
- Michel Vaucaire, 75, French lyricist ("Non, je ne regrette rien").
- Asquith Xavier, 59, British train guard and civil rights activist.

=== 19 ===
- Frederick Dove, 62, English Olympic swimmer (1936).
- Torcuato Fernández-Miranda, 64, Spanish politician, acting prime minister (1973).
- Georges Hugon, 75, French composer.
- Jijé, 66, Belgian comic book artist.
- Jean-François Lemarignier, 72, French historian.
- Mack Pemberton, 67, American politician, member of the Ohio House of Representatives (1967–1978).
- Jorge Urzúa, 94, Chilean politician.
- Gladys Wright, 88, English physical educator.

=== 20 ===
- John Beck, 80, English golfer.
- Jean-Baptiste Benoy, 53, Belgian Olympic wrestler (1948).
- Paddy Blanchfield, 68, New Zealand politician, MP (1960–1978).
- Amy Clarke, 87, English poet.
- David Feuerwerker, 67, French-Canadian rabbi and historian, heart attack.
- Glenn Jackson, 78, American engineer and transportation planner, cancer.
- Lewis Lawn, 51, New Zealand weightlifter.
- Allan Pettersson, 68, Swedish composer and violinist, cancer.
- Herman Stern, 92, German-born American humanitarian and businessman.
- Bill Svoboda, 51, American football player, heart attack.
- Jorma Vesterinen, 62, Finnish chess player.

=== 21 ===
- Ephigênio de Freitas, 61, Brazilian football player and manager.
- Avelino Gomez, 51, Cuban-Canadian jockey, injuries from racing accident.
- Bert Kaempfert, 56, German bandleader, music producer and composer ("Danke Schoen", "Moon Over Naples"), stroke.
- Leonid Martynov, 75, Soviet poet, journalist and translator.
- Folke Nilsson, 72, Swedish Olympic racing cyclist (1932).
- Francesco Patanè, 78, Italian artist.
- W. A. H. Rushton, 78, British physiologist.
- Jim Sutherland, 65, Canadian-born American football player and coach.

=== 22 ===
- Suzanne Bombardier, 14, American murder victim, stabbed.
- Monang Carvajal, 81, Filipino actress.
- Jesse Curry, 66, American police chief, heart attack.
- Wilhelm Ebel, 72, German legal scholar and Nazi official.
- Irmgard Fuest, 76, German politician.
- Paul Hall, 65, American trade unionist, cancer.
- Claire E. Hutchin Jr., 64, American general.
- John Marvin, 52, American Olympic sailor (1956).
- Eddie McLane, 80, American college sports coach.
- Ted Peters, 83, Australian politician, MP (1949–1969).
- Herman Salmon, 66, American pilot and air racer, plane crash.
- Luigi Ugolini, 88, Italian writer.

=== 23 ===
- Mario Amato, 42, Italian magistrate, shot.
- Vadim Berezinskii, 44, Soviet physicist.
- Alphonse Bergé, 94, English-American vaudeville performer.
- Sanjay Gandhi, 33, Indian politician, MP (since 1980), plane crash.
- Kishan Lal, 63, Indian Olympic field hockey player (1948).
- John Laurie, 83, Scottish actor (Dad's Army), emphysema.
- Jack Moore, 89, English cricketer.
- David Opas, 43, Australian judge, shot.
- Mira Pintar, 89, Slovenian artist and art curator.
- Jan Smeekens, 59, Dutch Olympic weightlifter (1948, 1952).
- Alberto Soria, 74, Peruvian footballer.
- Clyfford Still, 75, American painter.
- Alexander Tyshler, 81, Soviet artist and stage designer.
- Odile Versois, 50, French actress, cancer.

=== 24 ===
- John Alleyne, 71, Australian cricketer.
- Arnaldo, 85, Brazilian footballer.
- Connie Mack Berry, 65, American football player.
- David Burpee, 87, American businessman (Burpee Seeds and Plants).
- George Thomas Gahan, 67, Australian politician and amateur boxer.
- Fairlie Estelle Caroline Gascoyne-Cecil, 91, British plant collector.
- V. V. Giri, 85, Indian politician, president (1969–1974) and vice president (1967–1969), heart attack.
- Friedrich Hartig, 79, Italian entomologist.
- Tokuji Hayakawa, 86, Japanese businessman.
- Harold Jackson, 77, Australian politician.
- Tommy Jones, 73, English footballer.
- Boris Kaufman, 73, Russian-born American cinematographer (12 Angry Men, On the Waterfront, Baby Doll).
- George Milburn, 70, English footballer.
- Doreen Potter, 54–55, Jamaican composer and musician.
- Johan Poulsen, 89, Faroese politician.
- Bernard H. Raether, 91, American politician.
- Franklin C. Sibert, 89, American general.
- Emil Urch, 68, Croatian footballer.

=== 25 ===
- An Ziwen, 70, Chinese politician.
- Esther Cleveland, 86, American philanthropist, daughter of Grover Cleveland.
- Andrew Cowper, 81, Australian flying ace.
- C. Hartley Grattan, 77, American historian and economist.
- Casey Hayes, 74, American racehorse trainer.
- Tasman Heyes, 83, Australian public servant.
- Joe Muir, 57, American baseball player.
- Séamus Ó Duilearga, 81, Irish folklorist.
- Vilho Rinne, 85, Finnish Olympic javelin thrower (1928).
- Joe Tucker, 67, Australian footballer.
- Baganset U Thaw, 86, Burmese businessman and politician.

=== 26 ===
- Hal Aloma, 72, American steel guitarist.
- Peter Bretherton, 75, Australian footballer.
- Jimmy Carr, 86, Scottish footballer.
- Miriam Daly, 52, Irish communist activist, shot.
- Walter Dornberger, 84, German rocket scientist.
- Akiva Govrin, 77, Russian-Israeli politician, MK (1949–1969).
- Robert Grassin, 81, French racing cyclist.
- Ignatius Ya'qub III, 66, Syrian Orthodox prelate, patriarch of Antioch (since 1957).
- Luis Marquina, 76, Spanish filmmaker.
- Andrei Szilard, 66, Hungarian footballer.

=== 27 ===
- Edwin Barlow, 68, English cricketer.
- Barney Bigard, 74, American jazz clarinetist.
- John Bonomy, 62, Scottish footballer.
- Andrée Bosquet, 80, Belgian painter.
- Ahmet Muhip Dıranas, 70–71, Turkish poet and writer.
- Marcel Fischbach, 65, Luxembourgish politician and diplomat.
- Edward Michael Law-Yone, 69, Burmese journalist.
- Luther H. Lincoln, 65, American politician, member of the California State Assembly (1949–1959).
- Brant Little, 73, Canadian Olympic runner (1928).
- Carey McWilliams, 74, American author, editor and lawyer.
- Virgil K. Meroney, 59, American flying ace, cancer.
- Queena Stovall, 92, American folk artist.
- Sir Gordon Sutherland, 73, Scottish physicist.
- Trevor Wallace, 68, Australian footballer.

=== 28 ===
- Elspeth Janet Boog Watson, 80, Scottish writer, broadcaster and teacher.
- Helen Gahagan Douglas, 79, American actress and politician, member of the U.S. House of Representatives (1945–1951), breast cancer.
- Herbie Faye, 81, American actor, heart failure.
- Waldemar J. Gallman, 81, American diplomat.
- Eben Hopson, 57, American politician, cancer.
- Yoshirō Irino, 58, Japanese composer.
- José Iturbi, 84, Spanish conductor, pianist and actor.
- Václav Jírů, 69, Czech photographer.
- William H. Lane, 56, American businessman.
- Keijo Liinamaa, 51, Finnish politician, prime minister (1975).
- Frank McGill, 86, Canadian air vice marshal and football player.
- Henri Milloux, 82, French mathematician.
- Vladimir Pavlecka, 79, Czech-American inventor and aircraft designer, heart attack.
- George Etzel Pearcy, 75, American geographer.
- Albert Ravila, 82, Finnish Olympic sports shooter (1948).
- Warren Simpson, 58, Australian snooker player, complications from diabetes.

=== 29 ===
- Filipp Agaltsov, 80, Soviet air marshal.
- Jorge Basadre, 77, Peruvian historian.
- Charles L. Christ, 64, American geochemist.
- Joseph John Fahey, 78, American geologist, cancer.
- Ulrich K. Henschke, 65, German-American medical physicist, heart attack.

=== 30 ===
- Lester Brain, 77, Australian airline executive.
- Nikolai Biryukov, 78, Soviet general.
- Bhupati Bhushan Chowdhury, 49, Bangladeshi politician.
- Roger Duvoisin, 79, Swiss-born American children's author, heart attack.
- Virginia Brown Faire, 76, American actress, cancer.
- Phil Griggs, 62, English footballer.
- Thomas Browne Henry, 72, American actor.
- Eugen Jakobčič, 82, Yugoslav Olympic fencer (1936).
- Galina Serebryakova, 74, Soviet writer.
- Ladislav Tikal, 75, Czech Olympic gymnast (1928).
- Walter Max Zimmermann, 88, German botanist.
