= Norman Hardy =

Norman Hardy may refer to:

- Norman Hardy (cricketer, born 1892) (1892–1923), English cricketer
- Norman Hardy (cricketer, born 1907) (1907–1980), English cricketer

== See also ==
- Norman Hardie (1924–2017), New Zealand climber
