= Bonomy =

Bonomy is a Scottish surname. Notable people with the surname include:

- Iain Bonomy, Lord Bonomy (born 1946), Scottish judge
- John Bonomy (1918–1980), Scottish footballer

== See also ==
- Bonomi
