= David Snellgrove =

British Tibetologist (1920–2016)

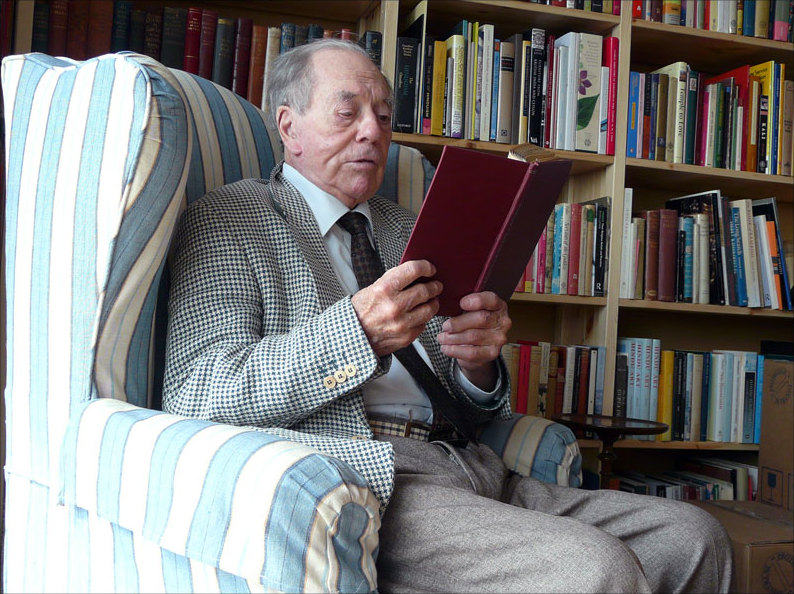
- Snellgrove in London, May 2011
- Born: David Llewellyn Snellgrove; 29 June 1920; Portsmouth, Hampshire, England
- Died: 25 March 2016 (aged 95); Pinerolo, Italy
- Known for: Study of Tibet
- Scientific career
- Fields: Tibetology
- Institutions: School of Oriental and African Studies

David Llewellyn Snellgrove, FBA (29 June 1920 – 25 March 2016) was a British Tibetologist noted for his pioneering work on Buddhism in Tibet as well as his many travelogues.

== Biography ==
Snellgrove was born in Portsmouth, Hampshire, and educated at Christ's Hospital near Horsham in West Sussex. He went on to study German and French at Southampton University. In 1941 he was called up to do his military service as a member of the Royal Engineers. He attended the Officers Cadet Training Unit in the Scottish seaside town of Dunbar, and was commissioned as an infantry officer. Thereafter he attended various intelligence courses and further training at the War Office in London, from where he requested a posting to India.

Snellgrove arrived in Bombay in June 1943, and travelled cross-country to Calcutta. He was stationed at Barrackpore, some way up the Hooghly River. A few months after beginning his posting he contracted malaria and was sent to the military hospital at Lebong, just north of Darjeeling. It was while he was at Lebong that he began his future life's calling by purchasing some books about Tibet by Charles Bell as well as a Tibetan Grammar and Reader.

Snellgrove returned to Darjeeling, from where he sometimes went on leave to Kalimpong. On one of these visits he took a young Tibetan into his personal employ in order to have someone with whom to practise speaking Tibetan. He also travelled in the small Himalayan state of Sikkim, and on one such visit he met Sir Basil Gould, who was then the British Representative for Tibet. Inspired to work in Tibet, in 1946 after he left the Army he sat the entrance exams for the Indian Civil Service. This was the first time the exams had been held since the start of the war, and the last time they were ever held. Although he passed the exams, he was not able to take up an appointment in India. Having already begun to study Tibetan, he resolved to find a university where he could further his studies. However, as no university offered courses in Tibetan at that time he was convinced by Sir Harold Bailey that a sound knowledge of Sanskrit and Pali would be beneficial, so he gained entry to Queens' College, Cambridge in October 1946. While at Cambridge, he converted to Roman Catholicism, in part through the influence of his friend Bede Griffiths.

In 1950, after having completed his studies at Cambridge, he was invited to teach a course in elementary Tibetan at the School of Oriental and African Studies University of London. He was Professor of Tibetan at SOAS until his retirement in 1982. Snellgrove's research subsequent to his retirement was focused increasingly upon the art history of South East Asia. He died on 25 March 2016 in Pinerolo, Italy.

Snellgrove was elected a fellow of the British Academy in 1969.

== Bibliography ==
=== Books and articles ===
- Snellgrove, David. (1956) Buddhist Morality. IN: Springs of Morality 239–257.
- Snellgrove, David. (1957) Buddhist Himālaya: travels and studies in quest of the origins and nature of Tibetan religion. Oxford: B. Cassirer.
- Snellgrove, David (1958). Note on the Adhyāsayasamcodana Sûtra. Bulletin of the School of Oriental and African Studies 21: 620–623.
- Snellgrove, David. (1959) The Notion of Divine Kingship in Tantric Buddhism. The Sacral Kingship (E.J. Brill, Leiden).
- Snellgrove, David. (1960) Cultural and Educational Traditions in Tibet. Science and Freedom 14: 26–33.
- Snellgrove, David. (1961) Shrines and Temples of Nepal. Arts Asiatiques 8 fasc. 1, pp. 3–10; fasc. 2, pp. 93–120.
- Snellgrove, David. (1961) Himalayan Pilgrimage: a study of Tibetan religion by a traveller through Western Nepal. Oxford: Bruno Cassirer.
- Snellgrove, David. (1966) For a Sociology of Tibetan Speaking Regions. Central Asiatic Journal 11: 199–219.
- Snellgrove, David. (1967) Four Lamas of Dolpo. Oxford: Bruno Cassirer.
- Snellgrove, David. (1967) The Nine Ways of Bon: excerpts from gZi-brjid. London: Oxford University Press.
- Snellgrove, David & Richardson, Hugh. (1968) A Cultural History of Tibet. London: Weidenfeld & Nicolson.
- Snellgrove, David. (1969) Cosmological Patterns in Buddhist Tradition. Studia Missionalia 87–110.
- Snellgrove, David. (1970) Sanctified Man in Mahāyāna Buddhism. Rome: Studia Missionalia, 55–85.
- Snellgrove, David. (1971) Buddhism in Tibet. Shambhala (Occasional Papers of the Inst. of Tibetan Studies) no 1, 31–44.
- Snellgrove, David. (1971) Indo-Tibetan Liturgy and its Relationship to Iconography. Mahāyāna Art after 900 A.D. 36–46.
- Snellgrove, David. (1971) The End of a Unique Civilisation. Shambhala (Occasional Papers of the Institute of Tibetan Studies) no 1, 3–6.
- Snellgrove, David. (1972) Traditional and Doctrinal Interpretation of Buddhahood. Bulletin of the Secretariat for Non-christian Religions (1970) 3–24.
- Snellgrove, David. Two Recent Studies in Buddhism. Heythrop J. 13 no. 3, 307–315.
- Snellgrove, David. (1973) Buddhist Monasticism. Shambhala (Occasional Papers of the Institute of Tibetan Studies) no 2, 13–25.
- Snellgrove, David. (1973) "Śākyamuni's Final 'nirvāṇa.'" Bulletin of the School of Oriental and African Studies, University of London, 36: 399–411.
- Snellgrove, David. (1974) In Search of the Historical Sākyamuni. South Asian Review 7: 151–157.
- Snellgrove, David & Tadeusz Skorupski. (1977) The Cultural Heritage of Ladakh, Warminster: Aris & Phillips.
- Snellgrove, David. (1978) The Image of the Buddha, Paris: UNESCO.
- Snellgrove, David. (1979) A Description of Muktinath, the Place of Promenade, Ku-tsab-ter-nga, Mount Mu-li, the Guru's Hidden Cave and the Sna-ri Lord (text translation). Kailash 7: 106–128.
- Snellgrove, David. (1979) Places of Pilgrimage in Thag (Thak Khola). Kailash 7 no. 2, pp. 70 ff. (75–170?). Dkar-chag.
- Snellgrove, David. (1980) The Hevajra Tantra: A Critical Study, London: Oxford University Press.
- Snellgrove, David. (1980) The Nine Ways of Bon: Excerpts from Gzi-brjid Edited and Translated, Boulder: Prajñā Press.
- Snellgrove, David. (1981) Himalayan Pilgrimage, Boulder: Prajñā Press.
- Snellgrove, David. (1982) Buddhism in North India and the Western Himalayas: Seventh to Thirteenth Centuries. IN: D. Klimburg-Salter, ed., The Silk Route and the Diamond Path UCLA Art Council, 64–80.
- Snellgrove, David. (1987) Indo-Tibetan Buddhism: Indian Buddhists and their Tibetan successors. London: Serindia.
- Snellgrove, David. (1988) "Categories of Buddhist Tantras." G. Gnoli & L. Lanciotti, Orientalia Iosephi Tucci Memoriae Dicata, Istituto Italiano per il Medio ed Estremo Oriente. vol. 3 pp. 1353–1384.
- Snellgrove, David. (1989) Multiple Features of the Buddhist Heritage. T. Skorupski, ed, The Buddhist Heritage 7–18.
- Snellgrove, David. Review of Meyer, Gso-ba Rig-pa. Bulletin of the School of Oriental and African Studies 46 pt. 1 (1983) 172–174.
- Snellgrove, David. (1996) Borobudur: Stûpa or Mandala? East and West 46 no 3-4: 477–484.
- Snellgrove, David. (2000) Asian Commitment: Travels and Studies in the Indian Sub-Continent and South-East Asia. Bangkok: Orchid Press.
- Snellgrove, David. (2001) The Relationship of Buddhism to the Royal Brahmanical Cult in the Khmer Empire. IN: R. Torella, ed., Le parole e i marmi (Rome).
- Snellgrove, David. (2001) Khmer Civilization and Angkor. Bangkok: Orchid Press.
- Snellgrove, David. (2004) Angkor, Before and After: a Cultural History of the Khmers. Bangkok: Orchid Press.
- Snellgrove, David. (2006) Religion as History, Religion as Myth. Bangkok: Orchid Press.
- Snellgrove, David. (2008) How Samten Came to Europe. Revue d'Études Tibétaines 14: 1–6.

=== Reviews ===
- Snellgrove, David (1951). The Book of Chao by W. Liebenthal. Bulletin of the School of Oriental and African Studies, University of London, Vol. 13, No. 4 (1951), pp. 1053–1055
- Snellgrove, David (1952). Mi-la Ras-pa by Helmut Hoffmann. Bulletin of the School of Oriental and African Studies, University of London, Vol. 14, No. 2 (1952), pp. 396–399
- Snellgrove, David (1954). Tombs of the Tibetan Kings by Giuseppe Tucci. Bulletin of the School of Oriental and African Studies, University of London, Vol. 16, No. 1 (1954), p. 200
- Snellgrove, David (1954). The Śatapañcāśatka of Mātṛceṭa by D. R. Shackleton Bailey. Bulletin of the School of Oriental and African Studies, University of London, Vol. 16, No. 1 (1954), pp. 199–200.
- Snellgrove, David. (1954). An Introduction to Tantric Buddhism by Shashi Bhusan Dasgupta. Bulletin of the School of Oriental and African Studies, University of London, Vol. 16, No. 1 (1954), pp. 178–179
- Snellgrove, David (1954). Manuel élémentaire de tibétain classique (méthode empirique) by Marcelle Lalou. Bulletin of the School of Oriental and African Studies, University of London, Vol. 16, No. 1 (1954), pp. 198–199
- Snellgrove, David (1954). Deux traités grammaticaux tibétains and Morphologie du verbe tibétain by Jacques A. Durr. Bulletin of the School of Oriental and African Studies, University of London, Vol. 16, No. 1 (1954), pp. 179–182
- Snellgrove, David (1956). Tibetan Folksongs from the District of Gyantse by Giuseppe Tucci. Bulletin of the School of Oriental and African Studies, University of London, Vol. 18, No. 1 (1956), p. 204
- Snellgrove, David (1956). The Na-khi Nāga cult and Related Ceremonies by J. F. Rock. Bulletin of the School of Oriental and African Studies, University of London, Vol. 18, No. 1 (1956), pp. 190–191
- Snellgrove, David (1958). Ancient Folk-Literature from North-Eastern Tibet (Introductions, Texts, Translations and Notes) by F. W. Thomas. Bulletin of the School of Oriental and African Studies, University of London, Vol. 21, No. 1/3 (1958), pp. 650–651
- Snellgrove, David. (1958). Oracles and Demons of Tibet: The Cult and Iconography of the Tibetan Protective Deities by René de Nebesky-Wojkowitz. Bulletin of the School of Oriental and African Studies, University of London, Vol. 21, No. 1/3 (1958), pp. 649–650
- Snellgrove, David. (1958). Thirteen Tibetan Tankas by Edna Bryner. Bulletin of the School of Oriental and African Studies, University of London, Vol. 21, No. 1/3 (1958), pp. 677–678
- Snellgrove, David (1959). L'épopée tibétaine de Gesar dans sa version lamaïque de Ling by R. A. Stein. Bulletin of the School of Oriental and African Studies, University of London, Vol. 22, No. 1/3 (1959), pp. 596–597
- Snellgrove, David (1959). Die tibetischen Handschriften und Drucke des Linden-Museums in Stuttgart by R. O. Meisezahl. Bulletin of the School of Oriental and African Studies, University of London, Vol. 22, No. 1/3 (1959), p. 621
- Snellgrove, David (1959). Preliminary Report on Two Scientific Expeditions in Nepal by Giuseppe Tucci. Bulletin of the School of Oriental and African Studies, University of London, Vol. 22, No. 1/3 (1959), pp. 377–378
- Snellgrove, David (1959). Mediaeval History of Nepal (c. 750–1480) by Luciano Petech. Bulletin of the School of Oriental and African Studies, University of London, Vol. 22, No. 1/3 (1959), p. 378
- Snellgrove, David (1959). Le parler de l'Amdo: étude dialecte archaïque du Tibet by Georges de Roerich. Bulletin of the School of Oriental and African Studies, University of London, Vol. 22, No. 1/3 (1959), p. 621
- Snellgrove, David. (1961). Nepal: A Cultural and Physical Geography by Pradyumna P. Karan, William M. Jenkins. Bulletin of the School of Oriental and African Studies, University of London, Vol. 24, No. 1 (1961), pp. 156–159
- Snellgrove, David. (1962). The Large sutra on Perfect Wisdom, with the Divisions of the Abhisamayālaṅkāra. Part I by Edward Conze. Bulletin of the School of Oriental and African Studies, University of London, Vol. 25, No. 1/3 (1962), pp. 376–377
- Snellgrove, David (1963). La civilisation tibétaine by R. A. Stein. Bulletin of the School of Oriental and African Studies, University of London, Vol. 26, No. 3 (1963), pp. 671–672
- Snellgrove, David. (1983). gSo-ba riq-pa, le système médical tibétain by Fernand Meyer. Bulletin of the School of Oriental and African Studies, University of London, Vol. 46, No. 1 (1983), pp. 172–174
- Snellgrove, David. (1985). Tibetan Thangka Painting: Methods and Materials by Janice A. Jackson, David P. Jackson. Bulletin of the School of Oriental and African Studies, University of London, Vol. 48, No. 3 (1985), pp. 580–582
- Snellgrove, David (1988). Il mito psicologico nell' India antica by Maryla Falk. Bulletin of the School of Oriental and African Studies, University of London, Vol. 51, No. 2 (1988), pp. 362–365
