= John Murrell =

John Murrell may refer to:

- John Murrell (bandit) (1806–1844), American river bandit
- John Murrell (chemist) (1932–2016), British theoretical chemist
- John Murrell, English writer on cookery (fl. 1614–1630)
- John Murrell (playwright) (1945–2019), American-born Canadian playwright

== See also ==
- Jack Murrell, Australian footballer
