= Azuka Oforka =

British actress and playwright

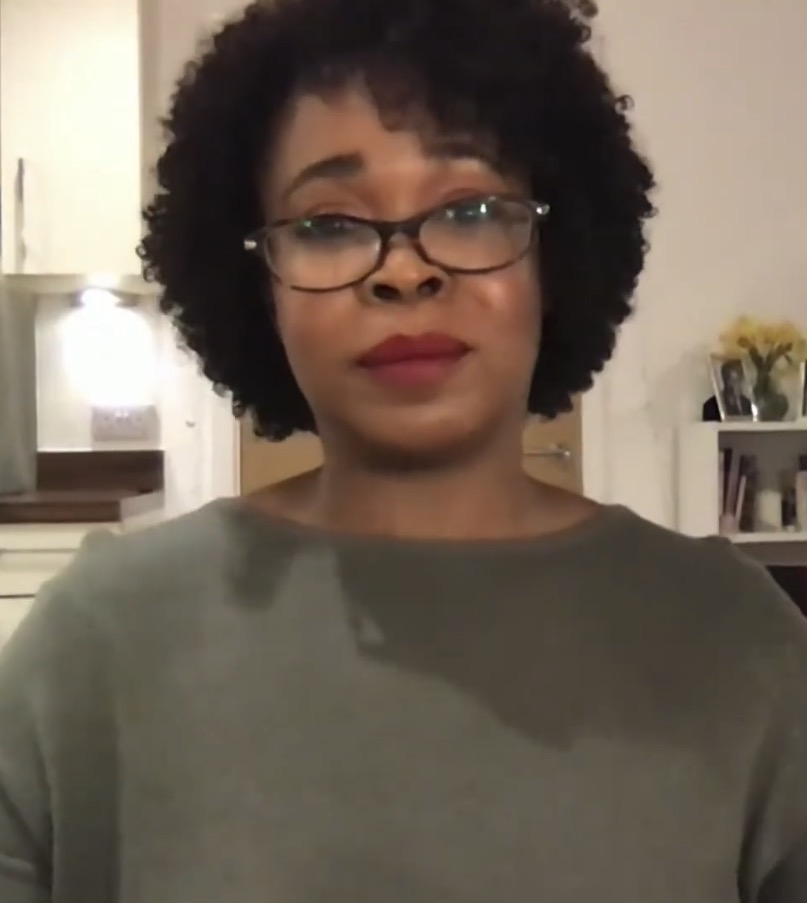
- Azuka Oforka in 2021
- Born: Azuka Elizabeth Oforka; 1981 (age 44–45); London, England, U.K.
- Education: Academy of Live and Recorded Arts
- Occupations: Playwright; Screenwriter; Actress
- Parent: Elizabeth Anionwu (mother)
- Relatives: Lawrence Anionwu (grandfather); Charles Venn (cousin)
- Writing career
- Notable awards: The Stage Debut Award for Best Writer (2024)

Azuka Elizabeth Oforka (born in 1981 in London) is an English actress, playwright, and screenwriter, now based in Penarth, South Wales.

As an actress, she is known for her role as nurse Louise Tyler in Casualty. Oforka's debut play was The Women of Llanrumney, which premiered at the Sherman Theatre in Cardiff in 2024 to critical acclaim.

== Early life and education ==
Oforka was born in 1981 in London and grew up in the neighbourhood of South Acton. Her mother is Dame Elizabeth Anionwu, a nurse and lecturer known for her work in sickle cell disease. Her maternal grandfather was Lawrence Anionwu, a Nigerian diplomat. Oforka was raised by her mother as a single parent. However, she frequently visited Nigeria to see her father (who died in 2014) as well as her mother's extended family during her childhood.

According to her mother's memoir, Oforka "had become determined to be an actress" around the age of nine. She was part of the National Youth Theatre and had a brief spell at the BRIT School after finishing secondary school.

== Career ==
=== Acting ===
Oforka worked as an actress before she started writing. She studied acting at the Academy of Live and Recorded Arts (ALRA), graduating in 2005. Oforka is known for portraying Louise Tyler in BBC One's medical drama Casualty from 2011 to 2019. Her most recent television role was as ICU nurse Anne Bowland on the ITV1/ITVX series Until I Kill You (2024).

=== Writing ===
==== The Women of Llanrumney (2024) ====
Oforka was inspired to write the play after her visit to Llanrumney Hall in Cardiff, where she saw a portrait of Captain Henry Morgan displayed without any references to his "brutal legacy of slavery". She wrote the play to address the lack of awareness and acknowledgement of Britain and especially Wales's links to slavery and colonisation.

Set in 1765, on Llanrumney estate in St. Mary, Jamaica, the real-life plantation founded by Captain Henry Morgan the play centred around the lives of enslaved housekeepers, Annie and Cerys, as well as their plantation owning enslaver, Elisabeth Morgan, who had mismanaged the estate to the point of financial collapse. The play was premiered in May 2024 at Sherman Theatre, Cardiff, where she had taken part in the writer development programme Unheard Voices two years prior.

Starring Suzanne Packer and Nia Roberts, the production received highly positive reviews, including five stars from The Guardian. The Women of Llanrumney was shortlisted for the Alfred Fagon Award for Black British playwrights in 2024. In the same year, the play also won Oforka a Stage Debut Award for Best Writer, in a joint victory with Sam Grabiner for Boys on the Verge of Tears. The play transferred to Theatre Royal Stratford East in March 2025 before returning to Sherman for an extend run between April and June in the same year.

==== Cross the Line (2025) ====
Oforka wrote Cross the Line as part of an educational initiative by Lyric Theatre, Hammersmith and Hammersmith and Fulham London Borough Council, developed to teach children in the borough about the signs of county lines drug trafficking and exploitation. The play was performed in touring productions across schools in Hammersmith and Fullham in 2025, and is set to run at Lyric Hammersmith in July 2026. Cross the Line was recognised at the 2025 UK Theatre Awards for Excellence in Arts Education.

==== Other works ====
Oforka has been commissioned to write a play for the Welsh National Theatre, newly established by Michael Sheen.

Oforka's play, ... that last summer, in collaboration with the Royal Welsh College of Music and Drama, was premiered at the Sherman Theatre June 2026, before being transferred to New Diorama Theatre in London in the same month.

== Personal life ==
Oforka moved to Cardiff in 2012 and has resided in Wales since.

She has openly spoken about her experience of racism at ALRA and was among the signatories of an open letter that called for the drama school's leadership to take action against racism at the institution.

Oforka is a cousin of her Casualty castmate Charles Venn.

== Filmography ==
=== Television ===
Year	Title	Role	Network/ Production company	Notes
2005	Casualty	Tania Kearton	BBC One	Guest role; Series 19 – Episode 47
2011–2019	Casualty	Louise Tyler	BBC One	Regular character; Series 26 to 33
2013	The Sarah Millican Television Programme	Herself	BBC Two	One episode
2021	Pointless Celebrities	Herself (contestant)	BBC One	Series 13 – Casualty special episode
2024	Until I Kill You	Anne Bowland	ITV1/ITVX	Supporting role; two episodes

=== Stage ===
Year	Title	Role	Venue(s)	Refs
2005	Low Dat	Tin Tin	Birmingham Repertory Theatre	
2007	The Electric Hills	Kelisha	Everyman Theatre, Liverpool	

== Writing credits ==
=== Theatre ===
Year	Title	Venue(s)	Refs
2024	The Women of Llanrumney	2024, 2025 - Sherman Theatre, Cardiff; 2025 - Theatre Royal Stratford East, London	
2025	Cross the Line	Lyric Theatre, Hammersmith	
2026	... that last summer	Sherman Theatre, Cardiff; New Diorama Theatre, London	

== Awards and nominations ==
Year	Awards	Category	Nominated work(s)	Result	Note
2016	Screen Nation Film and Television Awards	Female Performance in TV	Casualty	Nominated	
2024	Alfred Fagon Award		The Women of Llanrumney	Shortlisted	
2024	The Stage Debut Awards	Best Writer	The Women of Llanrumney	Won	
2025	UK Theatre Awards	Excellence in Arts Education	Cross the Line	Won	
2025	Standard Theatre Awards	Most promising playwright	The Women of Llanrumney	Nominated	
2026	Offie	Industry and Inclusion	The Women of Llanrumney	Nominated	
