= Bonomi =

Bonomi is an Italian surname. Notable people with the surname include:

- Andrea Bonomi (1923–2003), Italian footballer
- Andrea Bonomi (philosopher) (1940–2025), Italian philosopher and logician
- Beniamino Bonomi (born 1968), Italian canoer
- Carlo Bonomi (1937–2022), Italian voice actor
- Claudio Bonomi (born 1972), Italian footballer
- Eduardo Bonomi (1948–2022), Uruguayan guerrilla member and politician
- Giosuè Bonomi (born 1978), Italian road bicycle racer
- Giovanni Francesco Bonomi (1536–1587), Roman Catholic bishop and apostolic nuncio
- Gisella Bonomi (born 2000), Argentine Beach handball player
- Giuseppe Bonomi (1913–1992), Italian football player
- Ignatius Bonomi (1787–1870), English architect
- Ivanoe Bonomi (1873–1951), Italian prime minister
- Joseph Bonomi the Elder (1739–1808), English architect
- Joseph Bonomi the Younger (1796–1878), English sculptor
- Massimo Bonomi (born 1967), Italian rugby union player and sports manager
- Mauro Bonomi (born 1972), Italian footballer
- Roberto Bonomi (1919–1992), Argentine racing driver
- Ruggero Bonomi (1898–1980), Italian Air Force general
- Simone Bonomi (born 1980), Italian footballer

== See also ==
- Samuel Bonom (1912–1962), New York politician
- Bonomini, a surname
