= Olivia Porter =

Olivia Porter may refer to:

- Olivia Sophie L'Ange Shipp (1880–1980), also known as Olivia Porter, multi-instrumentalist
- Olivia Porter (cricketer) (born 2001), Australian cricketer
- Olivia Porter, daughter of John Boteler, 1st Baron Boteler of Bramfield, subject of Portrait of Olivia Porter by Anthony van Dyck
