= Fuest =

Fuest is a surname. Notable people with the surname include:

- Clemens Fuest (born 1968), German economist
- Irmgard Fuest (1903–1980), German politician and lawyer
- Robert Fuest (1927–2012), English film director, screenwriter, and production designer
