= Il Corriere del Popolo =

Defunct Italian-language newspapers published in San Francisco

Carmelo Zito took over the San Francisco newspaper Il Corriere del Popolo in 1935. Under Zito, it became one of the fiercest foes of Benito Mussolini's fascism on the West Coast. It vigorously attacked Italy's 1935 invasion of Ethiopia and its intervention in the Spanish Civil War. Zito helped form the Italian-American Anti-Fascist League and often attacked certain Italian prominenti like Ettore Patrizi, publisher of L'Italia and La Voce del Popolo. Zito's paper campaigned against the Italian pro-fascist language schools of San Francisco.

The University of Minnesota has some copies of Il Corriere del Popolo on microfilm. Newspaper, 1916–1962. 8 reels. Published weekly in San Francisco, California by C. Zito, 1911–1968. In English and Italian. Il Corriere del Popolo (The People's Messenger; absorbed L'Unione, Pueblo, CO), San Francisco, CA. Monthly (semi-weekly, weekly): 1935–1936, 1938–1940, 1942–1945, 1947–1954, 1957–1959, 1961–1962, 1965. (Microfilm: 1916–1962).

Book writing in Italian "Socialismo italiano esule negli" discusses Il Corriere del Popolo

(online site in which a copy of the Il Corriere del Popolo may be requested for research and study)
