= Furio Jesi =

Italian historian and archaeologist (1941–1980)

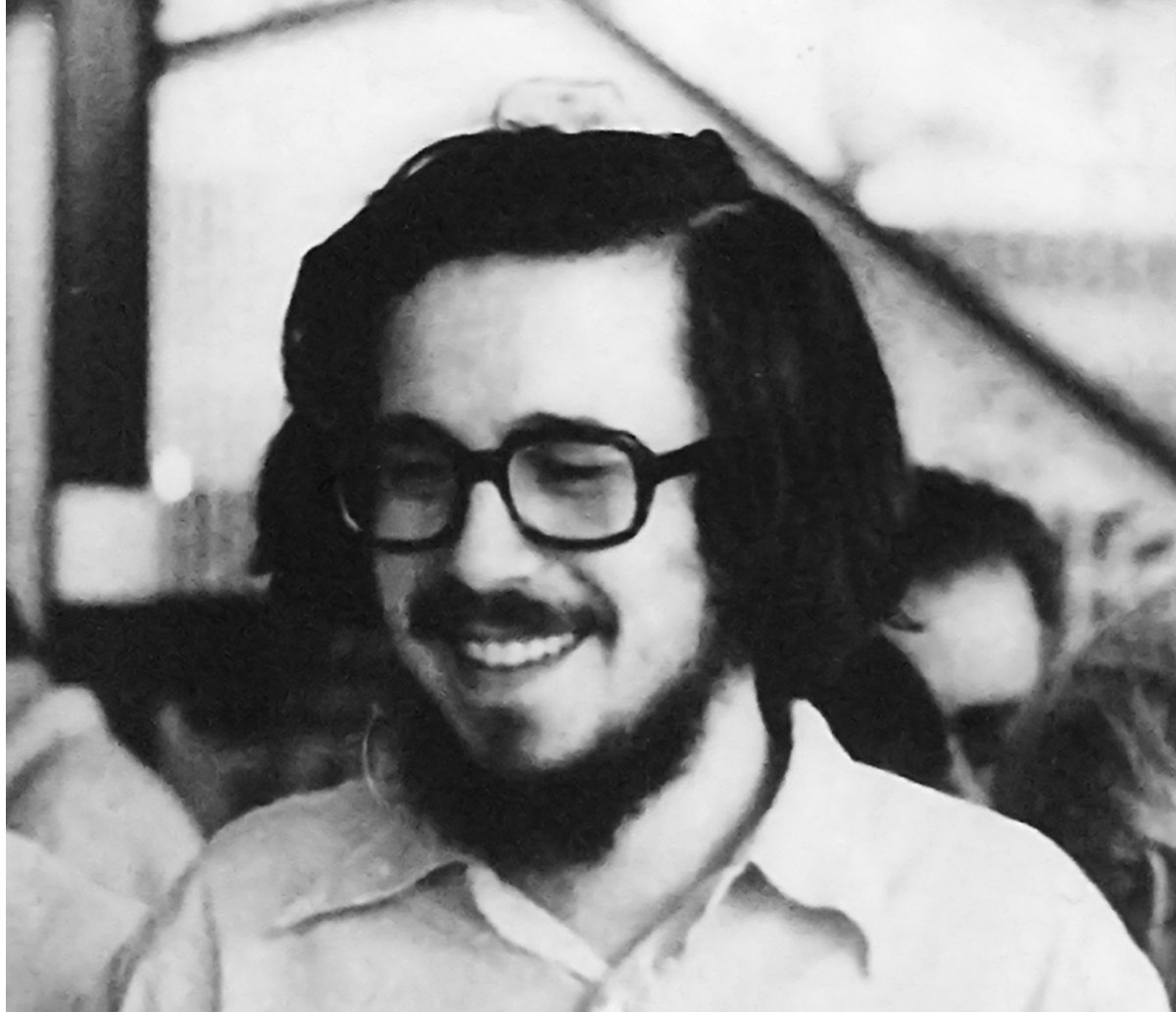

Furio Jesi (May 19, 1941 – June 17, 1980) was an Italian historian, writer, archaeologist, and philosopher.

== Career ==
Jesi was an independent scholar of myth, Egyptology, history of Mediterranean religions, philology and archeology, most notable for his work on extending the ideas of Károly Kerényi including studies of the science of myth and the difference between classic Myths and "Technified Myths".

With no formal degree, Jesi published, beginning at the age of 15, a series of studies on the world of ancient Greece and Egypt, including on the topic of mythological themes and mystery cults. His focus on the consistency of myths in modern times has influenced political activists like the Wu Ming collective in Italy.

Jesi was also an active translator and consultant for Italian publishers on the topic of German literature.

== Personal life ==
Furio Jesi was the only son of Bruno Jesi, who died when Furio was two. Furio Jesi was raised by his mother Vanna Chiron – an art historian.

Jesi died at age 39 of carbon monoxide poisoning at his home in Genoa, Italy.

== Works and publications ==
=== English ===
- Spartakus: The Symbology of Revolt (written in 1969, published in Italian in 1980, translated to English in 2014)

=== Italian ===
- La ceramica egizia. Dalle origini al termine dell'età tinita, SAIE, Torino 1958.
- Germania segreta. Miti nella cultura tedesca del '900, Silva, Milano 1967; nuova ed. con una postfazione di David Bidussa, Feltrinelli, Milano 1995.
- Letteratura e mito, Einaudi, Torino 1968; nuova ed. con un saggio di Andrea Cavalletti, ivi 2002.
- L'esilio, Silva, Roma 1970.
- Rilke, La Nuova Italia, Firenze 1971.
- Thomas Mann, La Nuova Italia, Firenze 1972.
- Che cosa ha veramente detto Rousseau, Ubaldini, Roma 1972.
- Kierkegaard, Editrice Esperienze, Fossano 1972; nuova ed. con una postfazione di Andrea Cavalletti, Bollati Boringhieri, Torino 2001.
- Saggio su Hermann Hesse pubblicato in "Hermann Hesse, Poesie", per la Lato Side diretta da Luigi Granetto, Roma 1980.
- Mitologie intorno all'illuminismo, Edizioni di Comunità, Milano 1972; nuova ed. parziale, con una presentazione di Giuseppe Ardrizzo, Pierluigi Lubrina Editore, Bergamo 1990.
- Il mito, ISEDI, Milano 1973; nuova ed. Arnoldo Mondadori Editore, Oscar Studio, 1980 e 1989; nuova ed. Mito, con una nota di Giulio Schiavoni, Nino Aragno Editore, Torino 2008.
- Brecht, La Nuova Italia, Firenze 1974.
- Che cosa ha veramente detto Pascal, Ubaldini, Roma 1974.
- La vera terra. Antologia di storici e prosatori sul mito e sulla storia, con un saggio di Georges Dumézil, Paravia, Torino 1974.
- Esoterismo e linguaggio mitologico. Studi su Rainer Maria Rilke, D'Anna, Firenze 1976; nuova ed. Quodlibet, Macerata 2002.
- La festa. Antropologia etnologia folklore, Rosenberg & Sellier, Torino 1977.
- Il linguaggio delle pietre. Alla scoperta dell'Italia megalitica, Rizzoli, Milano 1978.
- Cultura di destra, Garzanti, Milano 1979 e 1993; nuova ed. accresciuta Cultura di destra. Con tre inediti e un'intervista, a cura di Andrea Cavalletti, Nottetempo, Roma 2011.
- Materiali mitologici. Mito e antropologia nella cultura mitteleuropea, Einaudi, Torino 1979; nuova ed. aumentata a cura di Andrea Cavalletti, ivi 2001.
- La casa incantata, illustrata da Emanuele Luzzati, Vallardi, Milano 1982; nuova ed. illustrata da Franco Matticchio, Mondadori, Milano 2000.
- L’ultima notte, Marietti, Genova 1987.
- L'accusa del sangue. Mitologie dell'antisemitismo, postfazione di David Bidussa, Morcelliana, Brescia 1992; nuova ed. Bollati Boringhieri, Torino 2007.
- Lettura del «Bateau ivre» di Rimbaud, introduzione di Giorgio Agamben con una nota di Andrea Cavalletti, Quodlibet, Macerata 1996.
- (con Károly Kerényi), Demone e mito. Carteggio 1964-1968, a cura di Magda Kerényi e Andrea Cavalletti, Quodlibet, Macerata 1999.
- Spartakus. Simbologia della rivolta, a cura di Andrea Cavalletti, Bollati Boringhieri, Torino 2000.
- Bachofen, a cura di Andrea Cavalletti, Bollati Boringhieri, Torino 2006.
- "La ceramica egizia" e altri scritti sull'Egitto e la Grecia (1956-1973), a cura di Giulio Schiavoni, Nino Aragno Editore, Torino 2010.
- Il tempo della festa, a cura di Andrea Cavalletti, Nottetempo, Roma 2013.
- L'ultima notte, a cura di Giulio Schiavoni, con un ricordo dell'autore, di Elisabetta Chicco Vitzizzai, Nino Aragno Editore, Torino 2015.
