= Bruno Jesi =

Italian soldier

Bruno Jesi (11 January 1916 – 11 January 1943) was an Italian military man. Born in Udine and descended from an ancient family of Jewish rabbis and father of the Italian historian, writer, archaeologist and philosopher Furio Jesi, he was a cavalry officer awarded the Gold Medal of Military Valour for particular heroism.

Jesi volunteered in the Second Italo-Ethiopian War as a Blackshirt and was later involved in police operations in the colony as a second lieutenant of cavalry. He participated in numerous military actions, which earned him several decorations for bravery and crippled his right leg. Because of his Jewish origin, he was first dismissed and discriminated against, although he was later granted honorary Aryan status for his military service. He was granted rights by Mussolini to develop agriculture in Ethiopia by a Jewish corporation he founded. He died in Turin at the age of twenty-seven as a result of his injuries. In the town of Ruda, Friuli, a military cantonment assigned to the 33rd Infantry Battalion ARDENZA bears his name. Jesi developed a strong critical sense towards fascism later in life and was part of the Jewish Community Council in Rome.

== Bibliography ==
- Giovanni Cecini, I soldati ebrei di Mussolini. Mursia: Milan, 2008. Print. ISBN 9788842536031
