= Elizabeth Anionwu =

British nurse, professor and activist (born 1947)

Dame Elizabeth Nneka Anionwu OM DBE FRCN
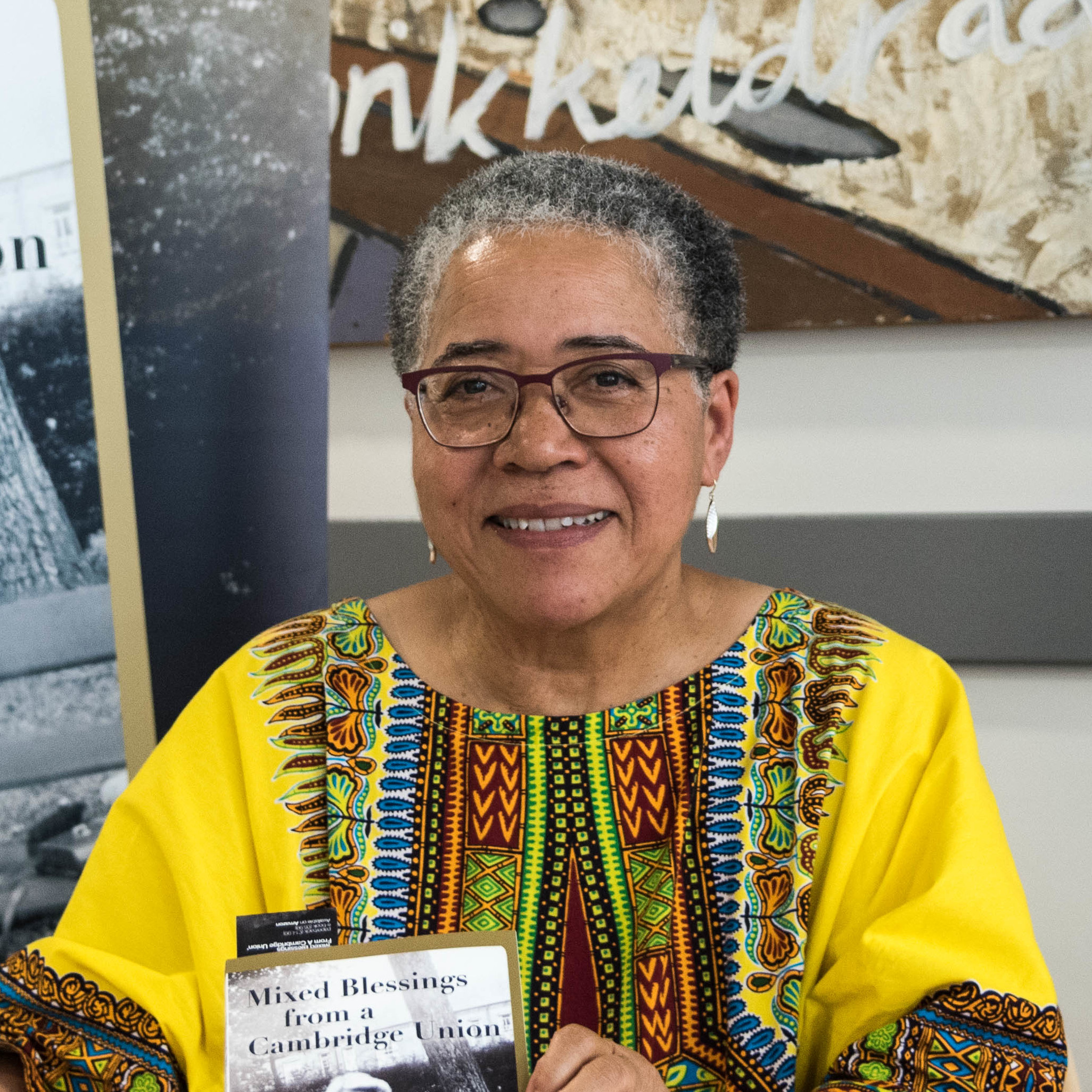
- Born: Elizabeth Mary Furlong; 2 July 1947 (age 78); Birmingham, England
- Known for: Nurse, lecturer, administrator
- Notable work: Dreams From My Mother (2021)
- Children: Azuka Oforka
- Parents: Lawrence Anionwu (father); Mary Furlong (mother)
- Awards: Order of Merit, Pride of Britain Awards Lifetime Achievement Award (2019)
- Website: www.elizabethanionwu.co.uk

Dame Elizabeth Nneka Anionwu (born Elizabeth Mary Furlong; 2 July 1947) is a British nurse, health care administrator, lecturer, and emeritus professor of Nursing at the University of West London.

In 1979, Anionwu became the United Kingdom's first sickle-cell and thalassemia nurse specialist, helping establish the Brent Sickle Cell and Thalassaemia Counselling centre with consultant haematologist Milica Brozovic. In 1998, by then a professor of nursing, Anionwu created the Mary Seacole Centre for Nursing Practice at the University of West London. She holds the Order of Merit, was appointed a Dame Commander of the Order of the British Empire and is a Fellow of the Royal College of Nursing (RCN). She retired in 2007, and in 2016 she published her memoirs, Mixed Blessings from a Cambridge Union.

== Early life ==
Elizabeth Nneka Anionwu was born Elizabeth Mary Furlong in Birmingham, to an Irish mother and a Nigerian father. Her mother, Mary Maureen Furlong, was in her second year studying classics at Newnham College, Cambridge. Her father, Lawrence Odiatu Victor Anionwu, was studying law, also at the University of Cambridge.

Her upbringing had been heavily affected by moving between institutions and family. She spent just over two years living with her mother, a relationship that ended when her stepfather, who did not accept her and drank heavily, started to physically abuse her. She was placed in a Catholic children's home where she was cared for by nuns, including several years in the Nazareth House convent in Birmingham.

Often harshly punished and humiliated for wetting the bed, she remembers being made to stand with a urine-soaked sheet over her head as a punishment for wetting the bed. In the book she recalls, that later in life when working as a health visitor, "I made sure to keep up-to-date with more humane treatments for bedwetting". Nonetheless, she grieved leaving the convent to go and live with her mother. Every period of relative stability in childhood ended in sudden collapse. Following an unsettled childhood she qualified as a nurse, then health visitor. Shortly before her 25th birthday she suddenly found her father: barrister and former Nigerian Ambassador to Italy and the Vatican, Lawrence Anionwu. She was to visit Nigeria frequently and later changed her surname to Anionwu.

== Family ==
Anionwu has credited her father, Lawrence Anionwu, a barrister and diplomat, as the first person to provide her with career advice. Anionwu has a daughter, the actress Azuka Oforka.

== Career ==
Anionwu began her nursing career inspired by a nursing nun who cared for her eczema at the age of four. At the age of 16, she left school with seven O-levels and started to work as a school nurse assistant in Wolverhampton. She continued with education to become a nurse, health visitor, and tutor. She travelled to the United States to study counselling for sickle-cell and thalassemia centres as courses were not then available in the UK. In 1979, she worked with Dr Milica Brozovic to create the first nurse-led UK sickle-cell and thalassemia screening and counselling centre in London Borough of Brent. This was the first of over 30 centres in the UK using the Brent Centre as a model.

From 1990 to 1997, worked as a lecturer at the Institute of Child Health, University College London, and was later promoted to senior lecturer in Community Genetic Counselling. With the help of Professor Marcus Pembrey, Anionwu taught a course at University College London for National Health Service (NHS) staff members who worked with communities affected or at risk of sickle-cell disease, cystic fibrosis, Tay–Sachs disease and thalassaemia.

Anionwu was appointed the dean of the School of Adult Nursing Studies and Professor of Nursing at University of West London. Here, she created the Mary Seacole Centre for Nursing Practice at the University of West London, retiring in 2007. In 2001, Anionwu, along with Professor Atkin, wrote The Politics of Sickle Cell and Thalassemia. In 2003 she became a Trustee and subsequently vice-chairperson of the Mary Seacole Memorial Statue Appeal and in 2005, she wrote, A Short History of Mary Seacole. Following the unveiling of the statue at St Thomas' Hospital in June 2016, she was appointed a Life Patron of the Mary Seacole Trust.

She chaired several projects for the NHS Sickle and Thalassaemia Screening Programme, including the development of "Caring for people with sickle cell disease and thalassaemia syndromes: A framework for nursing staff" that was accredited in 2010 by the Royal College of Nursing, and "Understanding the contribution of sickle cell and thalassaemia specialist nurses" (2012), funded through a grant from the Roald Dahl's Marvellous Children's Charity.

Anionwu is also a Patron of other charities:

- Sickle Cell Society
- Nigerian Nurses Charitable Association UK
- Vice President of Unite/Community Practitioners and Health Visitors Association
- Honorary Advisor to England's Chief Nursing Officer's Black & Minority Ethnic Strategic Advisory Group

== Publications ==
In 2016, she published the first edition of her memoir called Mixed Blessing from a Cambridge Union (ISBN 978-0-9955268-0-8). In 2021, her updated memoir, Dreams From My Mother, was published by Seven Dials, an imprint of The Orion Publishing Group. In her book, she reveals the many layers of her life, from a childhood marked by hidden truths to uncovering her father's identity, experiencing a political awakening, and emerging as a leader in Black health advocacy. She sheds light on the profound health disparities affecting ethnic communities, spanning issues from sickle cell disease to the inequalities exposed by the COVID-19 pandemic.

== Awards and honors ==
Anionwu was appointed Commander of the Order of the British Empire (CBE) in the 2001 Birthday Honours for her services to nursing. In 2004 she was awarded the Fellowship of the Royal College of Nursing (FRCN) for developing the sickle-cell and thalassemia counselling centre. In 2007, following her retirement, she was appointed Emeritus Professor for Nursing at the University of West London.

In 2010 she was inducted into the Nursing Times Nursing Hall of Fame for the dedication to the Development of Nurse-led Services. She also received the 2015 Lifetime Achievement Award on Divas of Colour. Anionwu was appointed Dame Commander of the Order of the British Empire (DBE) in the 2017 New Year Honours for services to nursing and the Mary Seacole Statue Appeal. Anionwu was awarded a Fellowship of the Queen's Nursing Institute in October 2017.

In 2019, in recognition of Anionwu's major contribution to nursing, research and campaigning, the University of St Andrews conferred on her the degree of Doctor of Science, honoris causa. Also in 2019 she was awarded an honorary doctorate from Birmingham City University, in recognition of her major contribution to the nursing profession.

At the Pride of Britain Awards in October 2019, Anionwu received the Lifetime Achievement Award, "in recognition of her passion for nursing and dedication to reducing health inequalities", the presentation being made Janet Jackson.

On 31 May 2020 Anionwu was the subject of an episode of Desert Island Discs on BBC Radio 4. She was on the list of the BBC's 100 Women (BBC) announced later that year on 23 November.

She was made a member of the Order of Merit in 2022.

In May 2023, she carried the Sovereign's Orb in the Royal procession at the Coronation of Charles III and Camilla.

== See also ==
- Timeline of women in science
- Women in science
