= Şäyxi Mannur =

- Born: 2 January 1905 (in Julian calendar); Tulbay
- Died: 11 June 1980 (aged 75); Kazan
- Occupation: Poet, translator

Şäyxi Mannur (Tatar: Шәйхи Маннур, Şäyxi Mannur; Russian: Шайхи Маннур; 2 January 1905 – 11 June 1980) was a Soviet and Tatar poet, writer, translator, and journalist.

== Biography ==
Şäyxi Mannur was born in the village of Tulbay in peasants' family. He received his education at rural madrasa, rural school in the village of Şämäk, pedagogical institute in Mamadysh and Soviet party school in Sverdlovsk.

In 1921, he left for Siberia, where he lived in different places and worked at different jobs. In 1927-1929 he served in the army. After completing his military service, he left for the Donbas, where he first got a job as a rolling agent at a metallurgical plant, later he was a school teacher and a concrete worker at the construction of Dniprohes; there he intensified his literary activity. Later, he worked for some time in the editorial office of the Tatar-language newspaper "Eşçe" ("Worker", Moscow), and in 1933 he moved to Kazan, where he graduated from the Kazan Pedagogical University in 1937. During the German-Soviet War, he was at the front as a war correspondent, in 1944 he joined the CPSU (however, he was subsequently expelled from the party for his position on certain issues). In 1946 he was appointed head of the literary part of the Kazan Opera and Ballet Theater and worked in this position until 1948. From 1949 until the end of his life he was a professional writer.

== Works ==
His first literary works were published in 1923.

- Tayğa töbennän Тайга төбеннән (1929) (From the depths of the taiga)
- Kolçedanlı tawlar östendä Колчеданлы таулар өстендә (1929) (Over the pyrite mountains)
- Ğaycan babay Гайҗан бабай (1934) (Grandfather Ğaycan)
- Yöräk cırları Йөрәк җырлары (1934) (Songs of the heart)
- Musa Муса (1968) (Musa, dedicated to Musa Cälil)
- Ağımsularğa qarap Агымсуларга карап (1974) (Looking at flowing waters, autobiographical)
- Çın söyü barmı Чын сөю бармы? (1974-1976) (Is there true love?)
- collections of poems for children.

Mannur translated the works of Russian (Alexander Pushkin, Mikhail Lermontov, Ivan Krylov, etc.), Ukrainian (Taras Shevchenko), and other (Shota Rustaveli, Zhambyl) poets into Tatar.
