= Philip Potter (church leader) =

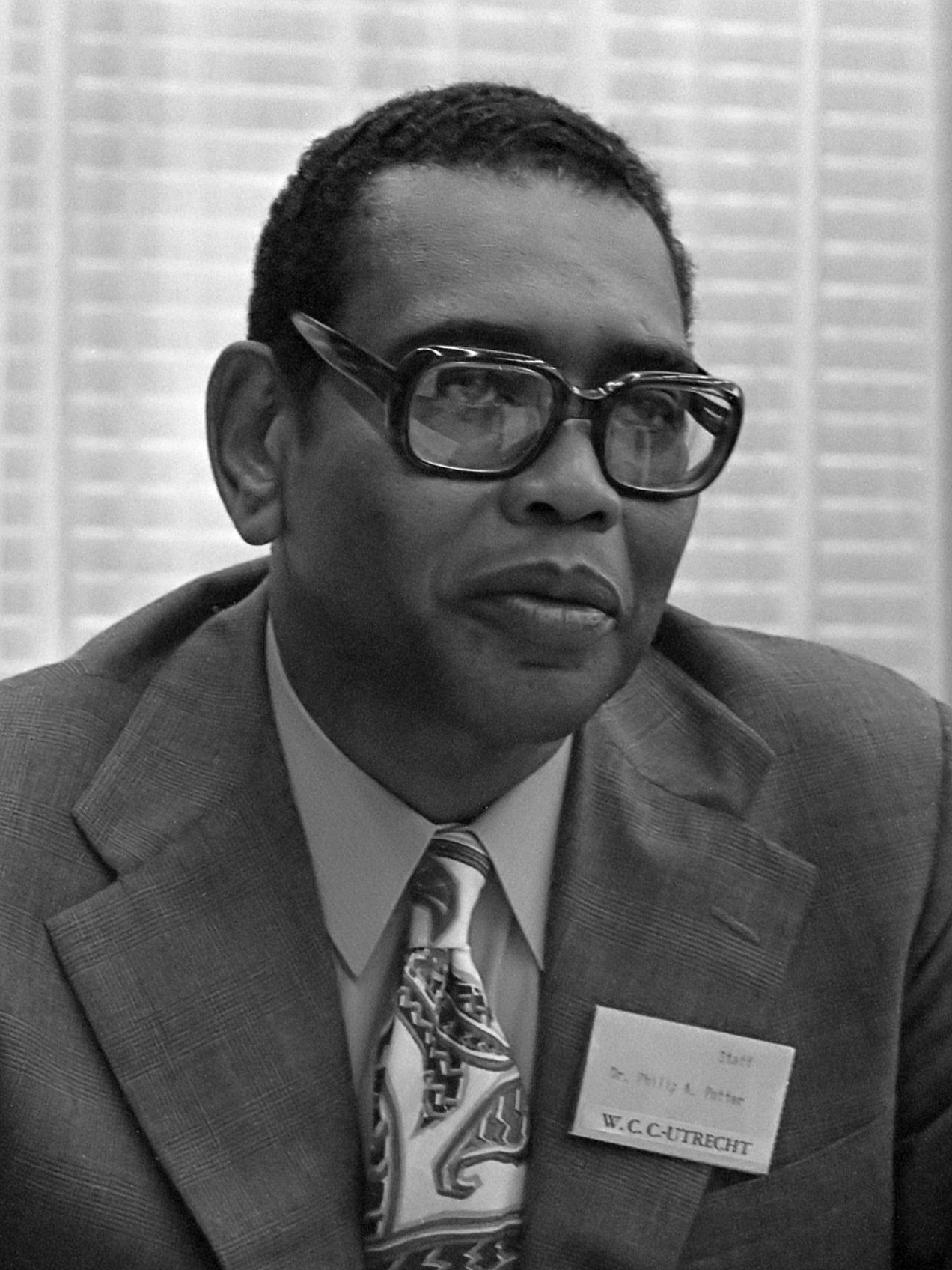
Philip Potter at the World Council of Churches congress in Utrecht (1972)

Philip Alford Potter (19 August 1921 – 31 March 2015) was a leader in the Methodist Church and the third General Secretary of the World Council of Churches (1972–1984).

== Early life and work ==
Potter was born at Roseau, Dominica, West Indies into a Christian family with a Protestant mother and a Catholic father.

He was active in church matters from an early age, and then became a lay pastor and ordained minister. He worked on the island of Nevis and with Creole-speaking people of rural Haiti, then on the staff of the Methodist Missionary Society in London. He represented the Jamaica Student Christian Movement at the 1947 world conference on Christian youth in Oslo, Norway, then was a spokesperson for youth at the first two assemblies of the World Council of Churches (WCC), at Amsterdam (1948) and Evanston (1954). In 1984 Potter received an honorary doctorate from the Faculty of Theology at Uppsala University, Sweden.

== World Council of Churches ==
Potter moved to Geneva in 1954 to work in the WCC’s youth department, and remained with the WCC until his retirement. He was the chairperson of the World Student Christian Federation from 1960 to 1968. From 1972 to 1984, he served as the WCC’s General Secretary. He was the first president of WSCF's Centennial Fund. He is considered a leader in world ecumenism.

In a speech on the occasion of his 85th birthday, at the WCC's 9th Assembly at Porto Alegre, Brazil in February 2006, Samuel Kobia (then General Secretary of the WCC) remarked, "Great strides were taken by the World Council of Churches under Philip Potter’s leadership; among the most memorable were the development of the theological consensus document Baptism, Eucharist and Ministry, the continuation of a courageous campaign against apartheid in southern Africa and other forms of racism throughout the world, a vigorous debate on the nature of post-colonial Christian mission, a co-ordinated witness for peace amid East-West tensions and the threat of nuclear annihilation, as well as an exploration of new forms of spirituality, worship and music drawing on the diverse traditions of the churches."

In November 2009 the WSCF launched the Philip Potter Fund. This Fund is to support Ecumenical Leadership Formation of young people through the WSCF. In conjunction with the WSCF event in November the WCC renamed its library The Philip Potter Library.

== Personal life ==
Potter's first wife, Doreen, the daughter of a Jamaican Methodist minister, died of cancer in 1980. In 1985, Potter married Bärbel Wartenberg, later Bishop of Lübeck, Germany 2001-2008. He died on 31 March 2015 in Lübeck, Germany.
