= Norman Hardy (cricketer, born 1892) =

English cricketer

Personal information
- Full name: Norman Hardy
- Born: 11 March 1892; Norton Malreward, Somerset, England
- Died: 17 November 1923 (aged 31); Fishponds, Bristol, England
- Batting: Right-handed
- Bowling: Right-arm fast-medium
- Role: Bowler

Domestic team information
- Years: Team
- 1912–21: Somerset
- First-class debut: 11 July 1912 Somerset v Northamptonshire
- Last First-class: 15 July 1921 Somerset v Worcestershire

Career statistics
Competition	First-class
Matches	11
Runs scored	169
Batting average	14.08
100s/50s	–/–
Top score	38
Balls bowled	1750
Wickets	34
Bowling average	21.97
5 wickets in innings	–
10 wickets in match	–
Best bowling	4/22
Catches/stumpings	6/–
- Source: CricketArchive, 30 January 2011

Norman Hardy (11 March 1892 – 17 November 1923) played first-class cricket for Somerset between 1912 and 1921. He was born at Norton Malreward, Somerset and died at Fishponds, Bristol.

Hardy was a right-handed, lower order batsman and a right-arm, fast-medium bowler. He first played for Somerset in two matches within a week in 1912, but achieved little in them. In 1919, he returned to the team as a professional for four matches, during which he both made his highest first-class score and had his best bowling return. In the match against Gloucestershire at County Ground, Taunton, in which Sydney Rippon played for Somerset under a false name, Hardy made 38, batting at No 10 and adding 58 for the ninth wicket with his captain, Jack White. Against Surrey, he took four first-innings wickets for 22 runs. In his four matches in 1919, Hardy took 18 first-class wickets at an average of 13 runs per wicket to be top of the Somerset averages for the season.

Hardy played in just two matches as an amateur in 1920 and three in 1921 without making much impact. He died suddenly from heart failure while playing football, aged 31.
