= Jim Kennedy (Australian footballer) =

Australian rules footballer (1908–1980)

Personal information
- Full name: James Kennedy
- Born: 30 December 1908; Lalbert, Victoria
- Died: 12 June 1980 (aged 71); Mildura, Victoria
- Original team: Havelock

Playing career^{1}
Years	Club	Games (Goals)
1931	North Melbourne	1 (0)
- ^{1} Playing statistics correct to the end of 1931.

James Kennedy (30 December 1908 – 12 June 1980) was an Australian rules footballer who played with North Melbourne in the Victorian Football League (VFL).
