= Jan Smeekens (weightlifter) =

Dutch weightlifter

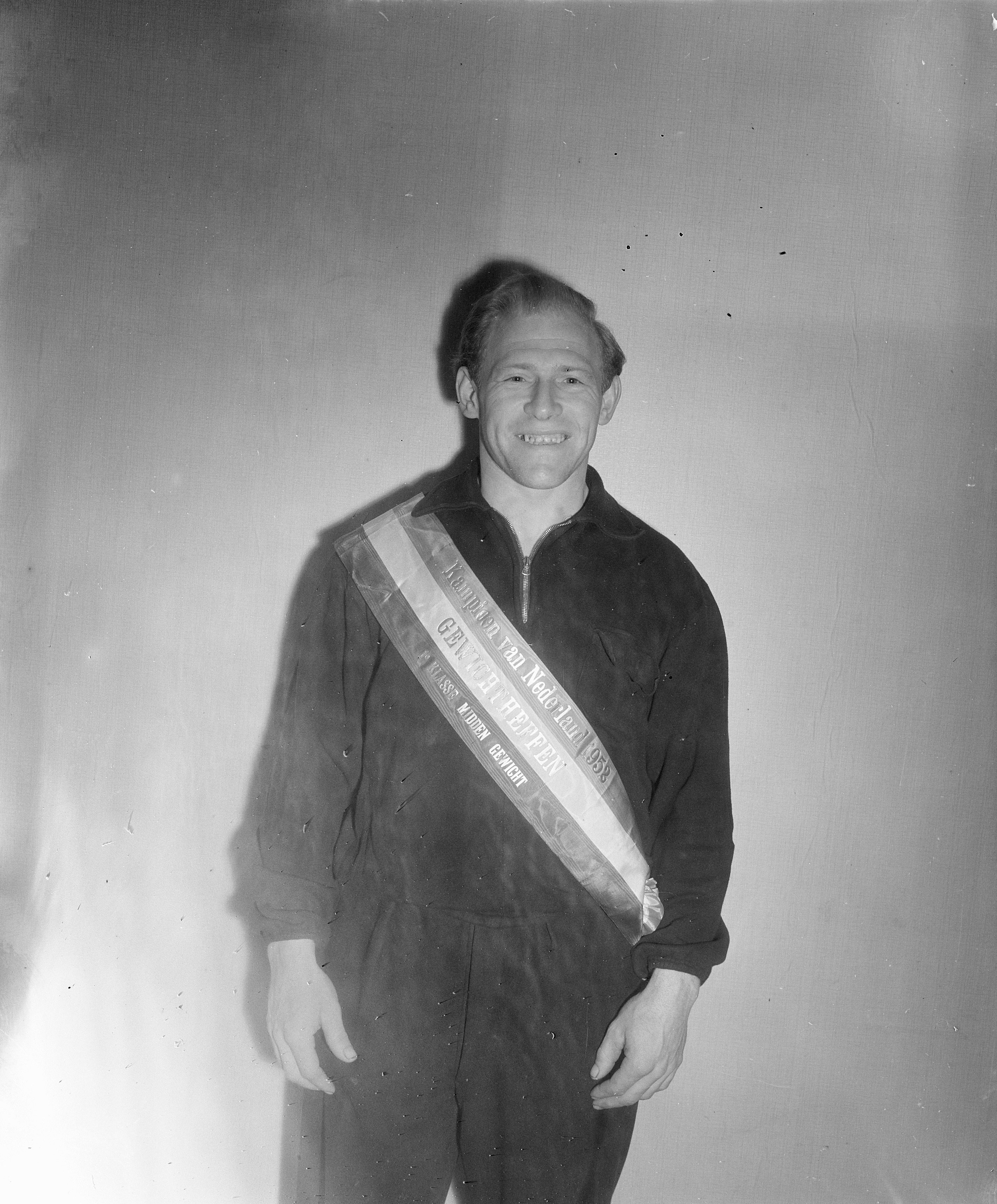

Personal information
- Nationality: Dutch
- Born: 13 July 1920; Ginneken en Bavel, Netherlands
- Died: 23 June 1980 (aged 59); Breda, Netherlands

Sport
- Sport: Weightlifting

Jan Smeekens (13 July 1920 – 23 June 1980) was a Dutch weightlifter. He competed at the 1948 Summer Olympics and the 1952 Summer Olympics.
