= Andrei Szilard =

Romanian footballer

Andrei Szilard / Elek Szilárd
Personal information
- Date of birth: 1914
- Date of death: 26 June 1980 (aged 66)
- Place of death: Debrecen, Hungary
- Position: Striker

Senior career*
Years	Team	Apps	(Gls)
1933–1939	Chinezul Timișoara	94	(21)
1939	CFR Timișoara		
1940–1941	Kolozsvári AC		
1941–1946	Debreceni VSC		

International career
1935	Romania	1	(0)
- * Club domestic league appearances and goals

Andrei Szilard or Elek Szilárd (1914 – 26 June 1980) was a Romanian-Hungarian footballer who played as a striker.

== International career ==
Andrei Szilard played one game for Romania on 25 August 1935 under coach Constantin Rădulescu in a friendly against Germany which ended with a 4–2 loss.
