= Mick Flynn (rugby union) =

- Full name: Brian Michael Flynn
- Born: 19 July 1949 Brisbane, QLD, Australia
- Died: 6 June 1980 (aged 30) Brisbane, QLD, Australia
- School: Marist College Ashgrove

Rugby union career
- Position: Flanker / Lock
Provincial / State sides
Years	Team	Apps	(Points)
1969–78	Queensland		
International career
Years	Team	Apps	(Points)
1971	Australia		

Brian Michael Flynn (19 July 1949 – 6 June 1980) was an Australian international rugby union player.

Flynn was born in Brisbane and educated at Marist College Ashgrove.

A versatile forward from the Brothers club, Flynn gained early experience against international opposition as a member of the Queensland state side, playing matches against Scotland and the Springboks, before joining the Wallabies squad for the 1971 tour of France. He featured in two uncapped matches during the tour.

Flynn died in 1980 at the age of 30 from an undiagnosed illness, suspected to be either a brain tumour or viral infection.

== See also ==
- List of Australia national rugby union players
