= Keith Whitehead =

Australian water polo player

Personal information
- Full name: Keith Dixon Whitehead
- Nationality: Australian
- Born: 9 September 1931; Bondi, New South Wales, Australia
- Died: 9 June 1980 (aged 48)

Sport
- Sport: Water polo

Keith Whitehead (9 September 1931 – 9 June 1980) was an Australian water polo player. He competed at the 1956 Summer Olympics and the 1960 Summer Olympics.
