= Jean-François Lemarignier =

French historian (1908–1980)

Jean-François Marie Joseph Louis Lemarignier (26 March 1908 – 19 June 1980) was a French medieval historian.

== Biography ==
Born into a legal family in Paris in 1908, Lemarignier graduated with a licenciate in law in 1929, before entering the École des Chartes on the advice of Paul Fournier. Graduating archivist-paleographer in 1933. He became librarian-archivist at the Conseil d'État in 1934. After military service in 1939–1940, he passed the agrégation in legal history in 1941.

He was named chargé de cours at the University of Lille Faculty of Law in 1942, titular professor at Lille in 1949, and titular professor at University of Paris Faculty of Law, where he taught until his retirement in 1979. From 1970 to 1979, following the reorganization of the University of Paris, he held the chair in "histoire des institutions publiques et des faits sociaux" at the Université Paris-Sorbonne (Paris IV).

He died in Paris in 1980.

== Work ==
A specialist of medieval history of the 10th to the 12th centuries, Lemarignier's research focused on the evolution of medieval French governmental institutions.

Lemarignier's books include:

- Étude sur les privilèges d'exemption et de juridiction ecclésiatique des abbayes normandes depuis les origines jusqu'en 1140 (Picard, 1937)
- Recherches sur l'hommage en marche et les frontières féodales (Travaux et Mémoires de l'Université de Lille, 1945)
- Histoire des institutions françaises du Moyen Age T. III: Institutions ecclésiastiques (with Jean Gaudemet and Guillaume Mollat, Presses Universitaires de France, 1962)
- Le gouvernement royal aux premiers temps capétiens (987–1108) (Picard, 1965)
- La France médiévale, institutions et société (Colin, 1970)

== Honours ==
Lemarignier received the 1re médaille des Antiquités de la France in 1938 for his work on monastic exemption, the Prix Gobert of the Académie des Inscriptions et Belles-Lettres in 1946 (second prize) and 1971 (first prize, for his book La France médiévale). He was elected a Corresponding Fellow of the British Academy in 1975.

He was also a Knight of the Légion d'honneur and an Officer of the Palmes académiques.
