= Monica Milne =

First woman diplomat in the UK

Monica May Milne MBE (20 December 1917 – 3 June 1980) was a British civil servant who in 1946 became the first woman to be appointed to the permanent staff of the Foreign Office.

Milne was born in Buckinghamshire to Dr. Robert Milne, a surgeon from Aberdeenshire, and Alice May Brown. She attended Somerville College, Oxford.

She joined the Ministry of Economic Warfare in 1940. In 1946, the complete ban on women entering the Foreign Office was lifted, though a maximum quota of 10% was set for entrants into the administrative branch, and those employed were obliged to resign when they got married. Monica Milne was taken in in the Administrative (A) Branch in 1946.

Before this, she had served with the Ministry of Economic Warfare in the US, and her performance had been so impressive that on her appointment to the Foreign Office in 1946 she was immediately posted back to Washington. She resigned after less than ten years of service because of the marriage rule.

Milne was appointed a Member of the Order of the British Empire in the 1946 Birthday Honours.

In 1948, she married Bristol businessman John Henshaw Britton, son of George Britton MP. She served as a Bristol magistrate from 1963-1975 and was Governor of Redmaids' High School

She died in 1980.
