= Bonomini =

Bonomini is an Italian surname. Notable people with the surname include:

- Ángel Bonomini (1929–1994), Argentine short story writer, poet, and translator
- Ernesto Bonomini (1903–1986), Italian anarchist
- Paolo Vincenzo Bonomini (1757–1839), Italian painter
