= Jim Paltridge =

English footballer

Personal information
- Full name: James William Paltridge
- Date of birth: 24 July 1891
- Place of birth: Plympton, England
- Date of death: 14 June 1980 (aged 88)
- Place of death: Sheffield, England
- Height: 5 ft 9 1/2 in (1.77 m)
- Position: Left half

Senior career*
Years	Team	Apps	(Gls)
- Woodland Stars
- Crownhill
- Woodland Villa
1912–1914	Plymouth Argyle	7	(0)
1914–1915	Chesterfield Town	31	(1)
1919–1922	Chesterfield	97	(5)
- Alfreton Town
- * Club domestic league appearances and goals

James Paltridge (24 July 1891 – 14 June 1980) was an English professional footballer who played in the Football League for Chesterfield as a left half.

== Personal life ==
Paltridge served as a staff sergeant in the Royal Army Service Corps during the First World War.

== Career statistics ==
Appearances and goals by club, season and competition
Club	Season	League			FA Cup		Other		Total	
Club	Season	Division	Apps	Goals	Apps	Goals	Apps	Goals	Apps	Goals
Plymouth Argyle	1912–13	Southern League First Division	3	0	0	0	—		3	0
Plymouth Argyle	1913–14	Southern League First Division	4	0	0	0	—		4	0
Plymouth Argyle	Total		7	0	0	0	—		7	0
Chesterfield Town	1913–14	Midland League	2	0	—		—		2	0
Chesterfield Town	1914–15	Midland League	21	1	4	0	2 (Note: Appearances in Derbyshire Senior Cup)	0	27	1
Chesterfield Town	Total		23	1	4	0	2	0	29	1
Chesterfield	1919–20	Midland League	31	3	3	0	1	0	35	3
Chesterfield	1920–21	Midland League	37	2	5	0	4 (Note: 2 appearances in Derbyshire Senior Cup, 2 appearances in Chesterfield Hospital Charity Cup)	0	46	2
Chesterfield	1921–22	Third Division North	29	0	1	0	0	0	29	1
Chesterfield	Total		95	5	9	0	5	0	109	5
Career total			127	6	13	0	7	0	147	6

== Honours ==
Chesterfield

- Midland League: 1919–20
- Derbyshire Senior Cup: 1920–21
- Chesterfield Hospital Charity Cup: 1920–21
