= George Etzel Pearcy =

American geographer

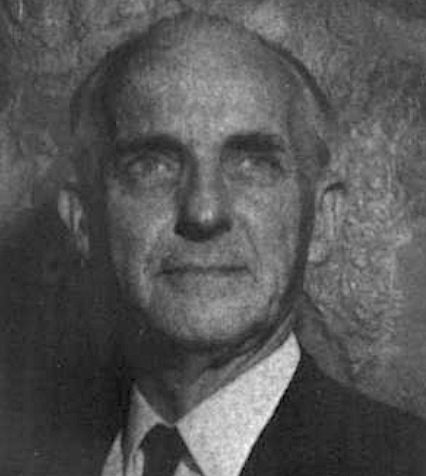
- George Etzel Pearcy, from a 1965 publication of the US Department of State
- Born: May 2, 1905; Greencastle, Indiana
- Died: June 28, 1980 (aged 75); San Francisco, California
- Education: University of California, Los Angeles (B.E., 1931), Clark University (A.M., 1932; Ph.D., 1940)
- Spouse: Florence Elizabeth Barili (m. 1937–1980)
- Awards: Fellow of the Royal Geographical Society
- Scientific career
- Fields: Geography
- Workplaces: United States Department of State, United States Board on Geographic Names, California State University, Los Angeles
- Thesis: Avignon, a study in urban geography (1940)

George Etzel Pearcy (May 2, 1905 – June 28, 1980) was an American geographer known for his plan to re-draw the United States map to have only 38 states. He also published influential work on America's global role in stewardship over the air.

== Early life and education ==
Pearcy was born in Greencastle, Indiana, on May 2, 1905, to George William and Dora Hodge Pearcy. He received his B.E. from the University of California, Los Angeles, in 1932, followed by an A.M. and Ph.D. from Clark University in 1933 and 1940, respectively.

== Career ==
Pearcy was an American Field Service fellow from 1933 to 1934. He joined the faculty of the University of Alabama in 1939, where he taught until 1942. He then worked as a geographer for Trans World Airlines from 1943 to 1950. From 1950 to 1957, he was an attache for the United States Foreign Service, after which he became the geographer for the State Department. From 1965 to 1969, he was the chairman of the United States Board on Geographic Names. In 1969, he left the State Department to join the faculty of California State University, Los Angeles, where he taught until his retirement in 1973.

== Affiliations with learned societies ==
Pearcy was a member of the Association of American Geographers, and served as chairman of their Middle Atlantic Region. He was also a fellow of the Royal Geographical Society.
