= Joseph Graeme Humble =

Joseph Graeme Humble CVO FRCP FRCPath
- Born: 10 July 1913
- Died: 10 June 1980 (aged 66)
- Occupation: Expert in Haematology

Joseph Graeme Humble (10 July 1913 – 10 June 1980) was Professor of Haematology at Westminster Hospital Medical School and a pioneering contributor to the success of marrow transplantation who was made a Commander of the Royal Victorian Order for personal services to the Royal Family.

== Early life ==
Humble was born in Mansfield, Nottinghamshire, the son of Wensley Taylor Humble and Louisa Anne Humble (née Whitham). He was educated at Bedford Modern School and at King's College London before enrolling in 1934 as a clinical student at Westminster Hospital where he was a keen sportsman representing the hospital at rugby and cricket.

== Career ==
Humble spent his entire career at Westminster Hospital spanning 41 years in the fields of pathology and haematology retiring as Emeritus Professor of Haematology in 1978.

Humble’s enduring contribution to haematology was his ‘pioneering work in marrow transplantation’. He was ‘actively engaged in improving and facilitating marrow transplantation in haematological diseases, cases of immunodeficiency, and in metabolic hereditary disorders in which essential enzymes were absent, until the time of his retirement in 1978’.

== Family life ==
In 1942, Humble married Elsie May Hunt, a nurse at Westminster Hospital. They had three sons one of whom became a pathologist and the other a ‘gifted historian and writer’.

Humble’s hobby was medical history and he published a history of Westminster Hospital Medical School and a biography of George James Guthrie, founder of the school and a Peninsula Army surgeon under Wellington.

Humble died of leukaemia on 10 June 1980.
