= Joe Tucker (footballer) =

Australian rules footballer, born 1913

Personal information
- Full name: Joe Tucker
- Born: 15 January 1913
- Died: 25 June 1980 (aged 67)
- Original team: Barwon / Anakie
- Height: 168 cm (5 ft 6 in)
- Weight: 70 kg (154 lb)

Playing career^{1}
| Years | Club | Games (Goals) |
| 1933–36, 1938–39 | Geelong | 24 (17) |
- ^{1} Playing statistics correct to the end of 1939.

Joe Tucker (15 January 1913 – 25 June 1980) was an Australian rules footballer who played with Geelong in the Victorian Football League (VFL).
