= Lillian Dean =

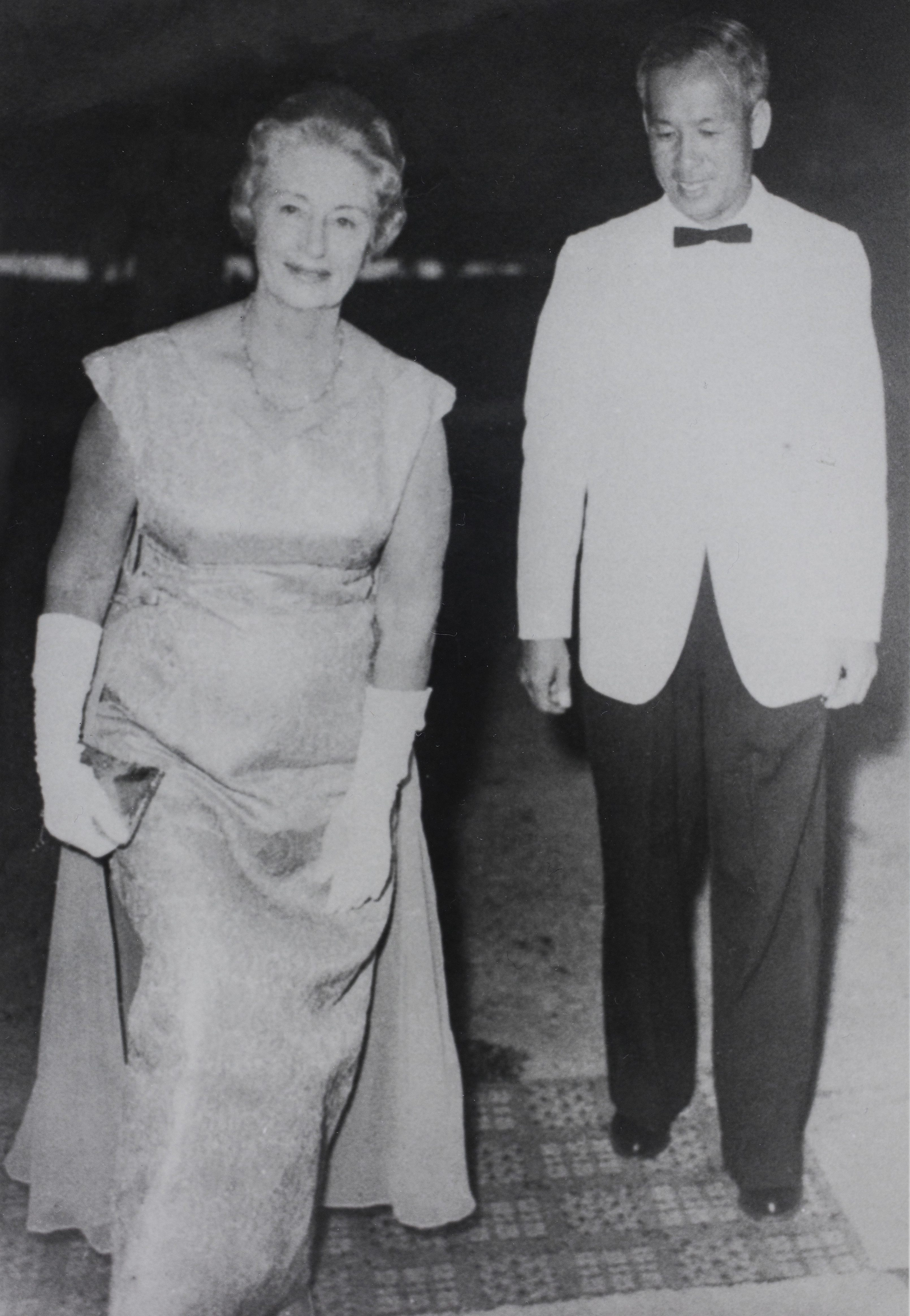
- Lillian Dean with Harry Chan

Personal details
- Born: Lillian Maud Dean c. 1899 Western Australia
- Died: 7 June 1980 (aged 80–81) Sydney
- Occupation: Photographer and politician

Lillian Maud Dean (c. 1899 – 7 June 1980) was a photographer and local government politician in Darwin in the Northern Territory of Australia. She was the first woman to be elected to local council in the Northern Territory.

== Early life ==
Dean was born in Western Australia and from an early age was interested in photography. In 1914 she was working as an assistant to a photographer retouching and colouring. After doing his job when he took ill one day she was totally committed to photography for her lifetime.

She spent time in Sydney before going to New Guinea for seven years. She was evacuated to Sydney when the Second World War began and working as an assistant for a city photographer, Norton Travaire. Over the next seven years she covered an average of 24 weddings each weekend. At the end of the evening, she would ask for the bridal car to drive her home.

== Photography ==
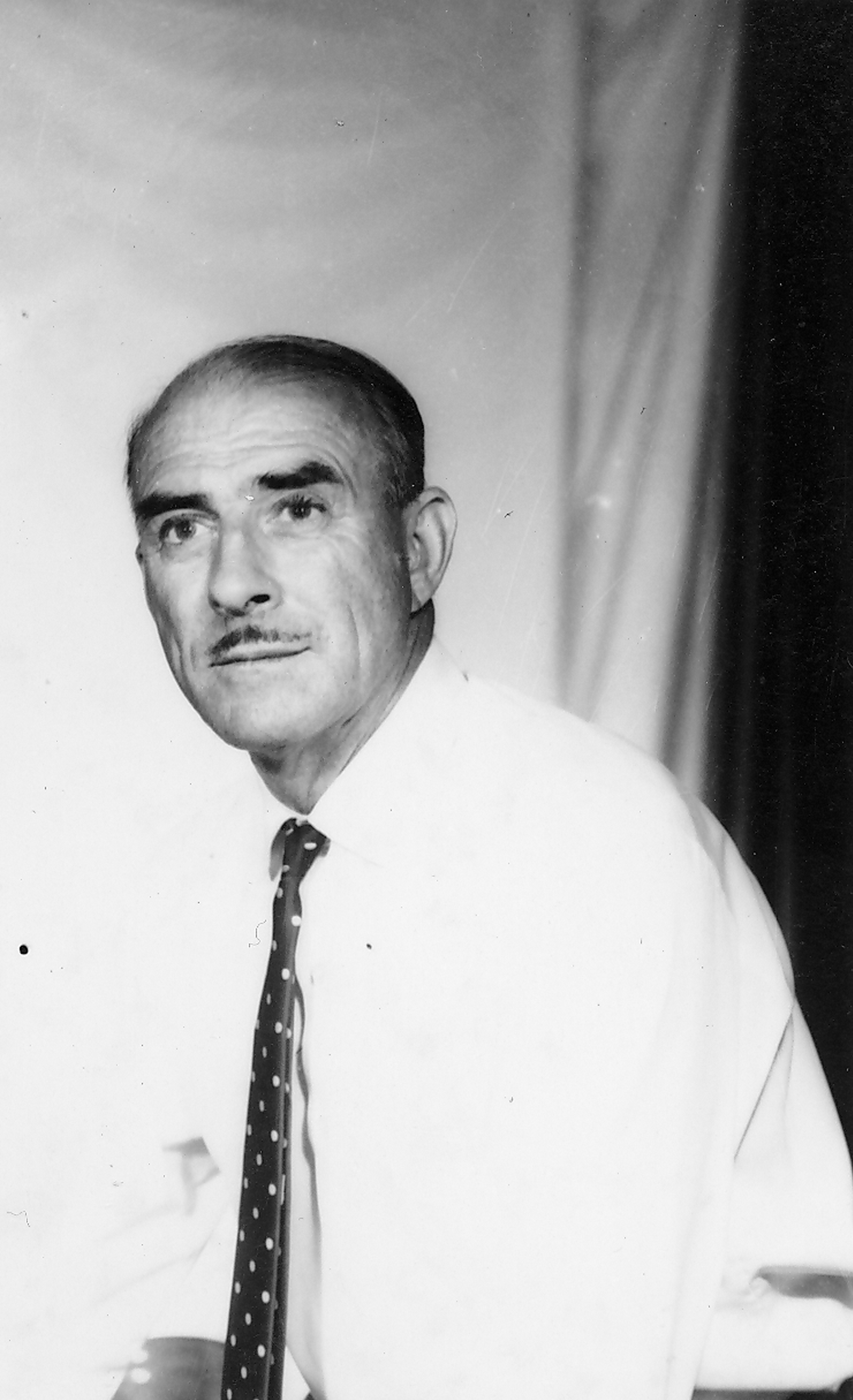
A portrait of Eric Charles Izod taken by Lillian Dean

In 1947 Dean and her colourist Margaret Dewhurst, decided to try working as a travelling photographic team. Arriving in Darwin in 1947 they discovered there was a real need for professional photographers. For the first two years they would do several months of photography and then drive back to Sydney to do the film processing after which they drove back to Darwin to deliver the product.

They decided to open a shop in Darwin. Despite white ants destroying one of their cameras before it was unpacked they opened on time and were gratefully welcomed.

Their first studio was in an old wartime hut on Daly Street. Initially they had trouble with prowlers, but the installation of floodlights scared off the potential thieves. One was arrested and sent to jail, but returned to the shop upon his release to have his photo taken.

She travelled regularly throughout the Territory as a photographer. Dean recounted some interesting and sometimes amusing incidents, like falling into a grave whilst trying to photograph funeral proceedings. When Albert Namatjira came to Darwin and saw the sea for the first time, and then painted it, she was asked to photograph him. Apart from the many weddings she also processed the many photographs that Bill Harney used for his stories of the Northern Territory. She estimated there were around 4,000 of those photos.

Dean also specialised in portraits and did many for the Greek population, "touching up" where necessary. These were often to send back to family in Greece, and in some cases were used where a man was seeking a wife from Greece. Her work also regularly appeared in local newspapers.

Eventually Dean moved the shop to Knuckey Street where it remained until she left Darwin in 1971. She also owned land in Fannie Bay.

== Politics ==
Dean became the first woman to be elected to local government. She served on Darwin City Council from 1958 to 1961, lost the next election, but was re elected in 1966 for a further three years, representing the Fannie Bay area. She was considered an effective and parochial councillor, and was noted for her success in moving that a 25 mph speed limit be enforced over a dangerous section of Gilruth Avenue, which had been the site of many accidents.

Dean maintained a keen interest in horse racing and served on the Darwin Turf Club Committee for ten years. She owned and raced a horse named "Gentleman." As well, she was a foundation member of the Darwin branch of the Royal Commonwealth Society and the Darwin Bowls Club, and helped establish the Automobile Association of the Northern Territory. She was an active fundraiser for local charities, and friends described her as outgoing, social, strong willed, and determined on issues which mattered to her.

== Later life ==
Dean retired to Sydney in 1971 after visiting her only child, a daughter, Hazel, in New Guinea. She died on 7 June 1980 at 81 years of age after a long illness. Her ashes were later scattered over Darwin Harbour during a special boat service.
