= Eugen Jakobčič =

Yugoslav fencer (1898–1980)

Personal information
- Born: 23 March 1898 Subotica, Austria-Hungary
- Died: 30 June 1980 (aged 82) Subotica, Yugoslavia

Sport
- Country: Yugoslavia
- Sport: Fencing

Eugen Jakobčič (23 March 1898 – 30 June 1980) was a Yugoslav fencer. He competed in the team sabre event at the 1936 Summer Olympics.
