= Doreen Potter =

- Born: Ethel Olive Doreen Cousins; 1925; Panama
- Died: 24 June 1980 (aged 54–55); Geneva
- Alma mater: Trinity College London
- Occupation: Composer, violinist
- Spouse(s): Philip Potter

Ethel Olive Doreen Cousins Potter (1925 – 24 June 1980) was a Jamaican religious composer and musician.

== Life and career ==
Ethel Olive Doreen Cousins was born in 1925 in Panama, the daughter of a Jamaican Methodist minister. She grew up in Jamaica and moved to England, where she attended St. Katherine's College in Liverpool and Trinity College London, earning her Licentiate in Music from the latter in 1957. In the 1950s, she played violin for a number of London orchestras.

In 1956, she married Philip Potter, general secretary of the World Council of Churches from 1972 to 1984. They lived in Geneva, headquarters of the WCC, where she worked as a choir director for a Church of Scotland congregation. She was part of the editorial committee overseeing the revision of the Cantate Domino hymnal, published in 1974 with seven of her hymns.

For the 1975 WCC Assembly in Nairobi, she collaborated with Rev. Fred Kaan, she providing music and he words for a book of hymns, Break Not the Circle. One of those hymns was "Let Us Talents and Tongues Employ", which Kaan called a "communion calypso." The music was from "Linstead," a Potter arrangement of the traditional Jamaican folk song "Linstead Market". Another was "Let Us Help One Another," to the tune of Potter's composition "Baronita". She also worked on an expanded edition of the Cantate Domino, published by Oxford University Press in 1980, published a month before her death.

Potter died of cancer on 24 June 1980 in Geneva.

== Bibliography ==
- Fred Kaan and Doreen Potter, Break Not the Circle: Twenty New Hymns (Carol Stream, IL, 1975)
