= Henri Milloux =

French mathematician

Paul Henri Milloux (13 April 1898, in Crépy-en-Laonnois – 28 June 1980, in Bordeaux) was a French mathematician, specializing in holomorphic functions and meromorphic functions in complex analysis.

Milloux did his secondary and undergraduate studies at the University of Lille from 1916 to 1921, although his studies were seriously disrupted by WW I. In 1921 he passed the agrégation. He received his PhD from the University of Paris in 1924 with thesis Le théorème de M. Picard. Suites de functions holomorphes. Fonctions méromorphes et functions entières. After several teaching jobs, he was appointed in 1926 as lecturer at the Faculty of Sciences of the University of Strasbourg. At Strasbourg, he worked closely with Georges Valiron, who left Strasbourg in 1931 for a position at the Sorbonne. In 1933 Milloux was appointed to the chair of infinitésimal calculus and higher mathematical analysis at the University of Bordeaux, where he remained until his retirement in 1965 as professor emeritus.

Milloux was an Invited Speaker at the International Mathematical Congress at Zürich in 1932 and again at Oslo in 1936. He established precise estimates that sharpened the qualitative results of Montel's theorem. He was elected in 1956 a corresponding member and in 1959 a full member of the French Academy of Sciences.
