= Andrea Bonomi (philosopher) =

Italian philosopher and logician (1940–2025)

Andrea Bonomi (1940 – 18 July 2025) was an Italian philosopher and logician, who studied with Enzo Paci.

== Life and career ==
Bonomi was born in Rome in 1940. After an initial interest in phenomenology (Existence and structure: Essay on Merleau-Ponty, 1967), he decided to dedicate himself wholeheartedly to the study of analytic philosophy, particularly the philosophy of language.

His major contributions have been concentrated in the area of formal semantics, especially in the field of the logic of epistemic, modal and temporal sentences. In particular, in Mental Events (1983), he proposed an original solution to the problem of the intentionality of propositional attitude attributions, based on the idea of perspectivity: the systematic ambiguity of interpretation which characterizes propositional attitude sentences is explained by way of the contrast between the point of view of the attributor and the point of view of the person who entertains the attitude attributed. Also of notable importance is his semantic analysis of fictitious contexts of language use (Universes of Discourse, 1979; The spirit of narration, 1994).

Bonomi died on 18 July 2025.

== Selected bibliography ==
=== Books ===
- Sintassi e Semantica nella Grammatica Trasformazionale (with G. Usberti), Il Saggiatore, Milano. 1971.
- La Struttura Logica Del Linguaggio, Bompiani, Milano. 1973.
- Le Vie Del Riferimento, Bompiani, Milano. 1975
- Universi Di Discorso, Feltrinelli, Milano. 1979
- Eventi Mentali, Il Saggiatore, Milano. 1983.
- Le Immagini Dei Nomi, Garzanti, Milano. 1987.
- Lo Spirito Della Narrazione, Bompiani, Milano 1994
- Tempo e Linguaggio. Introduzione Alla Semantica Del Tempo e Dell'Aspetto Verbale (with A. Zucchi), Bruno Mondadori, Milano 2001

=== Articles ===
Articles in Italian:

- "Linguistica e Logica", in Intorno alla linguistica, a cura di C. Segre, Feltrinelli, Milano 1983
- "Determinismo e Semantiche per le Logiche Temporali", in Atti del Convegno Nazionale di Logica, 1-5 ottobre 1979", Bibliopolis, Napoli. 1980
- "Sul Cogito Cartesiano: Natura Inferenziale e Criteri di Giustificabilità", in Problemi fondazionali nella teoria del significato, a cura di G. Usberti, Olschki Editore, Firenze 1991

Articles in English:

- “The Problem of Language in Husserl”. Telos 06 (Fall 1970). New York: Telos Press
- "On the Concept of Logical Form in Fregre, in H. Parret (ed.), History of Linguistic Thought and Contemporary Linguistics W. de Gruyter, Berlin-New York 1976 (pp.719–732)
- "Existence, Presupposition and Anaphoric Space, in Journal of Philosophical Logic, 6, 1977 (pp. 239–267)
- "A Problem About Intentionality", Topoi, 5, 1986 (pp. 91–100)
- "Relevant Situations", Synthese, 73, 1987 (pp. 623–636)
- "Persistent Truths", Intellectica, 1/2, 1992, (pp. 79–103)
- "Only:Association With Focus in Event Semantics" (with P. Casalegno), Natural Language Semantics 2, 1993 (pp. 1–45)
- "Tense, Reference and Temporal Anaphora", in Lingua e Stile, 30, 3, 1995 (pp. 483–500)
- "Transparency and Specificity in Intentional Contexts", in P. Leonardi and M. Santambrogio (eds.), On Quine, Cambridge University Press, Cambridge 1995 (pp. 164–185)
- "Aspect and Quantification", in P. M. Bertinetto, V. Bianchi, H. Higginbotham, M. Squartini (eds), Temporal Reference, Aspect and Actionality, vol. I, Rosenberg & Sellier, Torino 1995 (pp. 93–110)
- "Aspect, Quantification and When-Clauses in Italian", Linguistics and Philosophy, 20, 1997 (pp. 469–514)
- "The Progressive and the Structure of Events", in Journal of Semantics, 14, 1997 (pp. 173–205)
- "Indices and Contexts of Discourse, in Lingua e Stile, 33.3, 1998 (pp. 471–485)
- "Book Review: P. Ludlow, Semantic, Tense and Time, Linguistics and Philosophy, 25, 2002, (pp. 81–95)
- "A Pragmatic Framework for Truth in Fiction (with S. Zucchi), Dialectica, 57, 2003, (pp. 103–120)
