= Trevor Wallace (footballer) =

Australian rules footballer (1912–1980)

Personal information
- Born: 23 January 1912
- Died: 27 June 1980 (aged 68)
- Original team: Sea Lake
- Height: 180 cm (5 ft 11 in)
- Weight: 79 kg (174 lb)

Playing career^{1}
| Years | Club | Games (Goals) |
| 1933–34 | North Melbourne | 13 (0) |
- ^{1} Playing statistics correct to the end of 1934.

Trevor Wallace (23 January 1912 – 27 June 1980) was an Australian rules footballer who played with North Melbourne in the Victorian Football League (VFL).
