= John Jenkins (Australian footballer) =

Australian rules footballer

Personal information
- Full name: John Jenkins
- Born: 20 February 1936
- Died: 1 June 1980 (aged 44)
- Height: 196 cm (6 ft 5 in)
- Weight: 98 kg (216 lb)
- Position: Ruck

Playing career^{1}
Years	Club	Games (Goals)
1955–59	Richmond	34 (34)
1959–64	North Melbourne	71 (44)
Total		105 (78)
- ^{1} Playing statistics correct to the end of 1964.

John Jenkins (20 February 1936 – 1 June 1980) was a former Australian rules footballer who played with Richmond and North Melbourne in the Victorian Football League (VFL).
