= Julio Londoño Londoño =

Colombian historian and soldier

Julio Londoño (May 14, 1901 – June 13, 1980) was a Colombian historian and soldier.

== President of the Academy of History ==
In 1967 he was appointed as President of the Colombian Academy of History where he played a crucial role in compiling and categorizing an extensive history of Colombia. His speech on October 23, 1956, entitled: The Influence of Geography in the History of Colombia is recognized as a crucial element in historical and geographical studies of the country.
