= Jack Moore (cricketer) =

English cricketer

Personal information
- Full name: John William Spearink Moore
- Born: 29 April 1891; Winchfield, Hampshire, England
- Died: 23 June 1980 (aged 89); Basingstoke, Hampshire, England
- Batting: Right-handed
- Bowling: Right-arm medium

Domestic team information
- Years: Team
- 1910–1913: Hampshire

Career statistics
Competition	First-class
Matches	15
Runs scored	256
Batting average	13.47
100s/50s	–/–
Top score	30
Balls bowled	72
Wickets	0
Bowling average	–
5 wickets in innings	–
10 wickets in match	–
Best bowling	–
Catches/stumpings	4/–
- Source: Cricinfo, 29 January 2010

John 'Jack' William Spearink Moore (29 April 1891 – 23 June 1980) was an English first-class cricketer.

Moore was born in April 1891 at Winchfield, Hampshire. He trialled for Hampshire between 1909 and 1913, making his debut in first-class cricket in the 1910 County Championship against Sussex at Hove. He played first-class cricket for Hampshire irregularly, making fifteen appearances. He had little success with Hampshire and was unable to establish himself in the team, scoring 256 runs at an average of 13.47, with a high score of 30. Outside of first-class cricket, he played most of his club cricket for Basingstoke and Hartley Wintney. Moore died at Basingstoke in June 1980.
