= Síle Ní Chinnéide =

Irish-speaking historian and academic

- Síle Ní Chinnéide
- Born: Sheila (Sheilagh) Kennedy; 16 November 1900; Waterford, Ireland
- Died: 8 June 1980 (aged 79); Killín, Moinseal Park, Galway
- Occupation: Associate Professor of History through Irish at University College Galway

Síle Ní Chinnéide (16 November 1900 – 8 June 1980) was an Irish-speaking historian and academic.

== Early life and education ==
Síle Ní Chinnéide was born Sheila Kennedy to physician and surgeon Dennis Kennedy and his wife Catherine (also written Katherine) Redmond in Waterford, Ireland. Ní Chinnéide was one of eight surviving children, four boys and four girls and she was a middle child. Ní Chinnéide got her education in University College Cork gaining a BA in 1923, a master's degree in 1925 and a Higher education certificate. She studied with James Hogan and completed her thesis on The Plantation of Ulster. She won a scholarship to travel and did well on the continent. She returned and got a position as a lecturer in History in University College Galway in 1927. She stayed with the University until 1970. She was promoted to Associate Professor in 1965 and remained until her retirement.

== Career ==
Uniquely at the time UCG only had women in the history department. Of the four women who earned their degrees within the National University of Ireland and were employed by the NUI as academic historians, only Ní Chinnéide had initially specialised in history. Ní Chinnéide contributed articles to newspapers and radio as well as publishing works on local and European history. She produced a very useful edition of the notebooks of Charles-Etienne Coquebert de Montbret, French consul to Ireland. She was co editor of the Galway Archaeological and Historical Society journal as well as the Irish-language journal Galvia which she was instrumental in founding in 1954. She also helped found the National Irish Language Theatre, Taibhdhearc na Gaillimhe.

Hired as part of the Free State's commitment to teaching through Irish, her first courses were a set of Irish lectureships in History, Economics and Mathematics. The University College Galway Act, 1929 increased the funding for staff proficient in Irish. She was a supporter of mandatory Irish policies and promoted economic history and believed in internal migration as a way to deal with the poverty seen in Gaeltacht regions. Ní Chinnéide was appointed to the Advisory Board of the New History of Ireland project. She was effective as a teacher and mentor but did not support the direction Irish history appeared to be taking, disagreeing with revisionist historians about conclusions made from elitist documentation. She was a nationalist and wrote politically as well as historically. Ní Chinnéide died ten years after her retirement, in 1980 and was buried in Rahoon cemetery, Galway.
