= John Alleyne (cricketer) =

Australian cricketer (1908–1980)

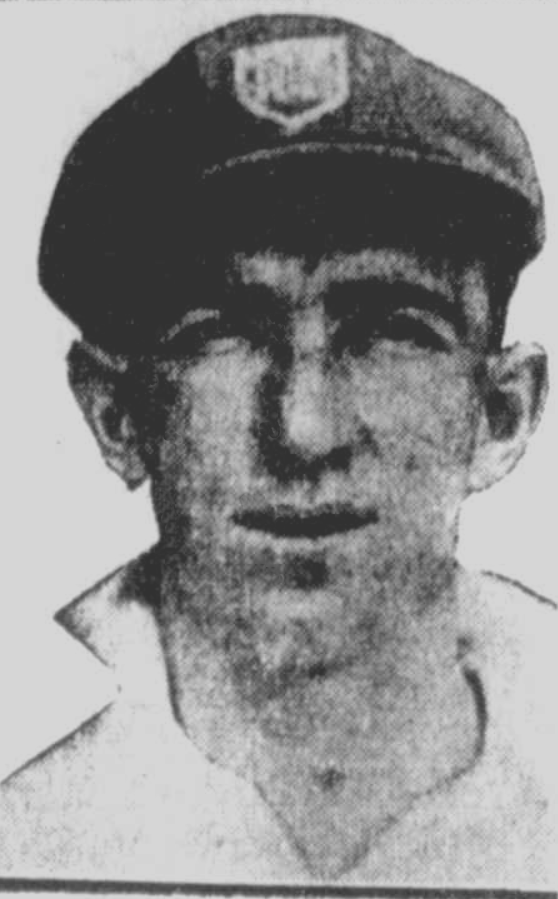

Personal information
- Full name: John Placid Alleyne
- Born: 1 August 1908; Sydney, Australia
- Died: 24 June 1980 (aged 71); Sydney, Australia
- Source: ESPNcricinfo, 22 December 2016

John Placid Alleyne (1 August 1908 – 24 June 1980) was an Australian cricketer. He played one first-class match for New South Wales in 1927.

== Cricket career ==
Alleyne was noticed as a cricketer as a teenager while attending the Holy Cross College in Ryde, playing for the Catholic Young Men junior cricket team which competed for the Martin Shield. He was described as one of the most promising juniors playing cricket for his batting and likely to be recruited by a grade cricket club by the Catholic Press in October 1925. Overall he scored 1000 runs in junior cricket in 1925, and in November 1925 he was selected in a combined Junior Cricket Union XI which played a combined First Grade cricket side on the Sydney Cricket Ground, and in December 1925 he was selected in a New South Wales junior cricket team which played a Victorian junior side in Melbourne.

In September 1926 Alleyne participated in practice with the Glebe cricket club, and as of October he was a member of the club and made his first grade debut in which he scored 64. In October 1927 a report noted Alleyne was showing very promising form and had an ideal temperament suggesting that "bigger things must be expected of him in the near future." In November a report described him as a "fine batsman" and praised his play on the leg side and noted that while he had a weakness to balls on his legs he had still played some "excellent shots" to yorkers, and another report called for him to be selected for the New South Wales Second XI. In December he was selected in the New South Wales First-class side for a match against Tasmania. He scored one run and a duck in his innings, and a report noted that he seemed to have been affected by the fact it was his debut and suggested that he may have more confidence if selected again, however it was his only First-class game.

== See also ==
- List of New South Wales representative cricketers
