= Nino Aragno Editore =

Italian publishing house

- Status: Active
- Founded: 1999
- Founder: Nino Aragno
- Country of origin: Italy
- Headquarters location: Turin
- Distribution: Italy
- Key people: Nino Aragno
- Publication types: Books
- Official website: www.ninoaragnoeditore.it

Nino Aragno Editore is a publishing house based in Turin, Italy, that specializes in works of literature, philosophy, and classics translated into Italian.

== History ==
The publishing house was established by entrepreneur and bibliophile Nino Aragno. In 2000, Raffaele Crovi was appointed editorial director, a position he held until his death in 2007. Since then, Nino Aragno has served as the sole director of the publishing house. The company's emblem is Chiron the centaur.

The publishing house is known for its editions of classical European thought, encompassing both ancient and modern works. It has also produced volumes in collaboration with prestigious institutions, including the Warburg Institute in London, the Collège de France, the Institute of Jewish Studies at the Free University of Berlin, the Italian Institute for Philosophical Studies in Naples, and the Benedetto Croce Library Foundation.

== Editorial series ==
The publisher's catalogue is organized into 29 editorial series, encompassing both essays and unpublished texts. These series cover a wide array of disciplines such as history, philosophy, art, literature, economics, politics, journalism, classical studies, and poetry. The most prominent series is the Biblioteca Aragno, which also includes works by renowned authors of the 19th and 20th centuries.

Among its most notable publications are the Journal of Edmond and Jules de Goncourt, the Memoirs of Talleyrand, and the correspondence between Giovanni Gentile and Benedetto Croce. The house has also republished the Vorträge (1921–1931) of the Warburg Institute and editions of works by Aby Warburg.

In collaboration with the Collège de France, two distinguished series have been published: Æuropa restituta, directed by Carlo Ossola, and La Poesia e la coscienza di sé, whose scientific committee included Yves Bonnefoy, Marc Fumaroli, George Steiner, Jean Starobinski, and Stefano Agosti.

The Classici del giornalismo series, directed by Alberto Sinigaglia, provides curated collections of writings by eminent journalists, offering a lens into the relationship between Italian culture, institutions, and politics. Other noteworthy series include The Kabbalistic Library of Giovanni Pico della Mirandola, overseen by Jewish studies scholar Giulio Busi, and Speculum Historiale, directed by medievalist Franco Cardini, which features essays and texts on the Middle Ages.

Poetry is represented by three dedicated series: Licenze poetiche, featuring contemporary poetry; I domani, curated by Maria Grazia Calandrone, Andrea Cortellessa, and Laura Pugno, focusing on Italian avant-garde poetry; Castalia, directed by Giovanni Tesio, dedicated to dialect poetry.

== Awards ==
On 16 May 2009, the jury of the Premio Nazionale Alassio 100 Libri – Un Editore per l’Europa awarded Nino Aragno Editore the 11th edition of the prize. On 25 March 2013, the President of the Italian Republic Giorgio Napolitano, upon the recommendation of the Minister of Cultural Heritage and Activities, awarded the publishing house the Gold Medal for Meritorious Contributions to Culture and the Arts. On 3 November 2016, Nino Aragno Editore received the Vittorio De Sica Prize for Publishing.
