= Carmelo Zito =

Italian-born American anti-fascist (1899–1980)

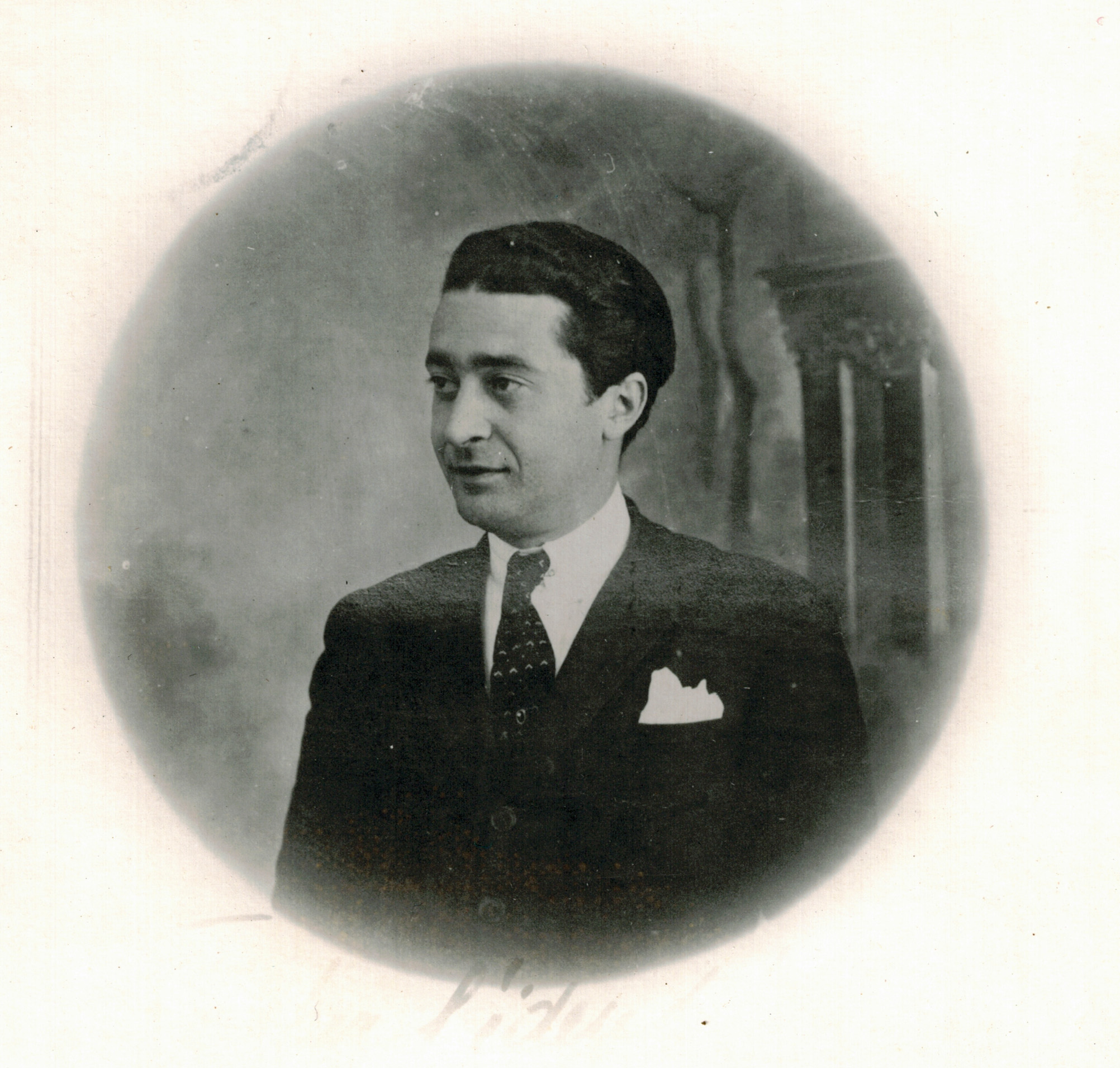
- Born: August 13, 1899; Oppido Mamertina, Italy
- Died: June 9, 1980 (aged 81); Sonoma, California
- Occupation(s): Journalist, Editor

Carmelo Zito (August 13, 1899 – June 9, 1980), born in Oppido Mamertina, Italy and immigrated to the United States circa 1923, was an outspoken Italian American immigrant who operated the Il Corriere del Popolo Italian-language newspaper in San Francisco, California, from 1935 through 1966. He was active in the Italian anti-fascist movement in the United States. Family members relate that he fled Mussolini's regime after learning that he was targeted for execution by the Fascists. However, local historians refer that Zito fled to the States after he shot with his hunting rifle, while drunk, a statue of the Virgin Mary: an event that infuriated the people of his village, who vehemently demonstrated against the act of blasphemy.

A veteran of World War I, Zito moved to New York in 1923. He joined an anti-fascist paper there in 1925, then moved to San Francisco in 1931 and took over Il Corriere del Popolo. During World War II, he testified before congressional and state committees concerning fascist influences that he perceived in Italian-American political and civic organizations.

He died on June 9, 1980.
