= Sjraar Cuijpers =

Dutch architect

Gerard Hendrik Hubertus Cuijpers
- Born: 24 May 1902; Blerick, Netherlands
- Died: 12 June 1980 (aged 78); Sittard, Netherlands
- Occupation: Architect

Gerard Hendrik Hubertus Cuijpers, also known as Sjraar Cuijpers (24 May 1902 – 12 June 1980), was a Dutch architect primarily known for his architectural works in the city of Sittard, Netherlands.

Cuijpers was born on May 24, 1902 in Blerick, Netherlands. In 1930, Cuijpers made a career shift when he transitioned to working for the municipal government service. (Gemeentewerken) in Sittard. In 1933, Cuijpers partnered with Dutch town planner Ben Moolhuysen to design the Sittard municipal swimming pool in the Sittard city park. Their pool design was submitted to the architectural designs event during the art competitions at the 1936 Summer Olympics hosted in Berlin. The facility remained fully operational until 1985. While the pool itself was demolished in 1995, its original entrance building was preserved as a historical landmark. He spent the remainder of his life rin the region, passing away on June 12, 1980, at the age of 78 in Sittard.
