= Gladwell Richardson =

American writer of Wild West folklore (1903–1980)

Gladwell Grady Richardson (September 4, 1903 – June 14, 1980) was an Indian trader and writer, known for his contributions to Arizona folklore of the Old West through his Western novels and folklore. He was part of the Richardson family that established trading posts in northern Arizona in the early 20th century. Richardson began his writing career in the mid-1920s writing nautical fiction, with his wife Millie as part of the editing and typing team. Together, they produced hundreds of novels and articles, many of which were published in Europe. Richardson made Flagstaff his home and later ran the Two Guns Trading Post. He published under his own name, but also under many pen names, with "Maurice Kildare" his most popular.

== Early life ==
Richardson was born in 1903 in Alvarado, Texas, the son of Indian trader Samuel Irby Richardson and Susan Annabelle Meador. He had one older brother and one older sister. He grew up in Oklahoma until the age of 10. His father was part of the "Smith-McAdams-Richardson" Indian trading dynasty which traced its roots back to his family's origins as trappers in the North American fur trade. His father first started trading in Arizona in 1896.

Richardson began working as a clerk at the Houck Trading Post in 1918, but also attended university at Oklahoma A&M. He left to join the Marines in San Francisco, but his father got him discharged because he was underage. Not to be deterred, he immediately joined the Navy. Richardson was 19 when he visited San Francisco in 1923. There, he was involved in an altercation where he attacked 22-year-old rabbi Alfred G. Lafee, who died from his injuries several days later. Richardson fled the state but was later captured and brought to trial for the crime. He argued that he acted in self-defense and the case was eventually dismissed.

He later began taking classes again at Northern Arizona Normal School, but dropped out to return to Houck. The next year he got married and began publishing nautical stories, his first fictional works, with the help of his wife.

== Work ==
Richardson's first novel, The Killer of Kamerun (1937), was published in Britain under the pseudonym "John R. Winslowe". Philip Reed Rulon, emeritus professor of history at Northern Arizona University, suggests that Richardson used many pseudonyms to avoid market saturation. "Maurice Kildare" was his most notable pen name, with which the Western Writers of America recognized him with at least one award.

After his death, Navajo Trader (1989), Richardson's unpublished manuscript about his life, was edited by historian Philip R. Rulon and released. In his review of the book, anthropologist David M. Brugge notes that "Richardson spent a great part of his life as a writer of fiction. The present book grew out of his fondness for writing as a storyteller, not from a desire to be a scholar. If he gave way to the temptation to embellish parts of his narrative, it must be acknowledged that what he produced is a personal document, not a product of research." Brugge also acknowledges that it is not known if Richardson had ever intended to publish it.

== Later life ==
He re-enlisted in the Navy in 1942 to serve in World War II and was awarded a Navy Cross. He enlisted again in 1946 in the reserve corps and later served in the Korean War where he was awarded the Korean Service Medal and the United Nations Service Medal. He reached the rank of chief journalist with his service ending in 1962. He continued writing fiction until the late 1960s, when he transitioned to a kind of historical non-fiction. Upon the centennial celebration of the birth of writer Zane Grey, Richardson published four articles on the topic. A stroke in the 1970s limited his writing output. He died from cancer in 1980 at the Fort Whipple Veteran's Administration Center in Prescott, Arizona. His papers and extensive photography collection are held by the Arizona Historical Society.

== Personal life ==
Richardson married Millicent Margaret Green in 1925. She was an essential part of the writing team, and together they wrote hundreds of novels and thousands of articles. Richardson was also close friends with Navajo tribal chairman Chee Dodge. United States senator Barry Goldwater was a part of Richardson trading post history, as he co-owned the Rainbow Lodge and Navajo Trading Post, originally established by Richardson's father, from 1946 to 1951.

== List of pen names ==
In addition to his own name, Richardson used dozens of pen names. His most popular pen name was Maurice Kildare, which he used to publish just under 100 articles in western pulp magazines. Many of these pen names were erroneously cited as scholarly authorities on the Old West until the 21st century.

- George Blacksnake
- Sinclair Bower
- Ormand Clarkson
- Buck Coleman
- Jeff Corner
- Robert Davis
- Stuart Flag
- M.I. Ford
- John S. Haines
- Pete Kent
- Ormand Klarkson
- Cary James
- Calico Jones
- Jack Lowence
- Maurice Kildare
- Maurice Kildaresen
- Grant Maxwell
- Higgs Meador
- Charles McAdams
- Asdzani Noodi Naalte
- Warren O'Riley
- Earl Price
- "Toney" Richardson
- John Robert Ringo
- Don Teto
- Frank Warner
- John R. Winslow
- John R. Winslowe

== Selected works ==
- Arizona Guns (as Ormand Klarkson, 1937)
- The Boothill Kid (as Ormand Klarkson, 1937)
- The Trail to Nowhere (as Maurice Kildare, 1938)
- Gun Thunder (as Ormand Clarkson, 1938)
- The Rattlesnake Range (as John Winslowe, 1938)
- Cowboy Joe (as Maurice Kildare, 1939)
- Rio Guns (as Maurice Kildare, 1939)
- Night Riders (as himself, 1939)
- War Horse Range (unknown)
- The River of the Lone Rope (unknown)
