= Queena Stovall =

American painter (1887–1980)

- Born: Emma Serena Dillard; December 20, 1887; Amherst County, Virginia, U.S.
- Died: June 27, 1980 (aged 92)
- Known for: Painting
- Movement: American Folk Art

Queena Stovall (December 20, 1887 – June 27, 1980) was an American folk artist. Sometimes called "The Grandma Moses of Virginia", she is famous for depicting everyday events in the lives of both white and black families in rural settings.

== Early life ==
Born Emma Serena Dillard in Amherst County, Virginia, she received the nickname “Queena” from her grandmother because of the way young children would pronounce "Serena". She married Jonathan Breckenridge Stovall, a traveling salesman, in 1908 and the pair had nine children. The family lived in Lynchburg, Virginia during the fall and winter and on a farm near Elon, Virginia during the spring and summer.

== Career ==
After her brother persuaded her to take an art class at nearby Randolph-Macon Woman’s College in Lynchburg, Stovall began painting at age sixty-two. Her instructor there was Spanish artist Pierre Daura, who encouraged her to stop taking classes and develop her own unique style.

Stovall's career spanned less than two decades, and she produced forty-nine paintings. Her art depicted scenes of ordinary rural life such as crop harvests, animal butchering, funerals, jarring for the winter, baptisms, cooking, and livestock and estate auctions. Stovall combined bright colors with attentive details, and would use figures out of magazines and advertisements to understand the composition needed for her paintings. Her first solo exhibition was at the Lynchburg Art Center in 1956. Stovall continued to paint until her health started to decline in the late 1960s.

== Legacy ==
Stovall's work is currently found in family collections, Virginia-area museums such as the Virginia Museum of Fine Arts, and other museums such as the Fenimore Art Museum in Cooperstown, New York. The Daura Gallery at the University of Lynchburg holds the largest public collection of Stovall’s work.

=== Exhibitions and features ===
- An exhibition, Queena Stovall, Artist of the Blue Ridge Piedmont, was mounted in 1974–1975 and traveled to Lynchburg College, in Lynchburg, Virginia, October 6–25, 1974; to the Abby Aldrich Rockefeller Folk Art Museum, Williamsburg, Virginia, January–March, 1975; and to the New York State Historical Association, Cooperstown, New York, April–September, 1975.
- Stovall's paintings were shown at the 1982 World's Fair in Knoxville, Tennessee.
- Stovall's paintings were shown in 1988 at the United States Embassy in Paris, France.
- Stovall's paintings were featured in the 1994 exhibition Grandma Moses' Southern Sisters: Queena Stovall and Clementine Hunter at the Theatre Art Galleries in High Point, North Carolina.
- A major exhibition of Stovall's work, featuring 44 of her 49 paintings and titled Inside Looking Out, The Art of Queena Stovall, was mounted by curators at the Daura Gallery in 2018 and traveled to the Virginia Historical Society in Richmond, Virginia.
- Stovall was featured in the 2019 exhibit Memory Painting: Harriet French Turner and Queena Stovall at the Taubman Museum of Art.

=== Other media ===
- The 1983 film Queena Stovall: Life's Narrow Space was produced by Jack Ofield.
- Stovall's work was featured the book The Art of Queena Stovall: Images of Country Life by Claudine Weatherford in 1986
- In conjunction with the exhibit Inside Looking Out, the Art of Queena Stovall, Daura Gallery curators compiled a book with the same title.

=== Cultural ===
- In 2010, Stovall was posthumously honored as one of the Library of Virginia's "Virginia Women in History" for her contributions to folk art.
- In 2017, the Virginia Department of Historic Resources approved a historic marker in her honor, to be erected near the farm where she spent 35 years of her life, the Wigwam. It was erected in March, 2018.
