= Şämäk =

Şämäk Шәмәк
- derevnya
- Location within Tatarstan
- Country: Russia
- Region: Tatarstan
- District: Mamadış District
- Time zone: UTC+3:00

Şämäk (Tatar: Шәмәк, romanized: Şämäk) is a rural locality (a derevnya) in Mamadış District, Tatarstan. The population was 330 as of 2010. Şämäk is located 46 km from Mаmadış, district's administrative centre, and 153 km from Qazаn, republic's capital, by road. The earliest known record of the settlement dates from 1619. There are 2 streets in the village.
