= Maryla Falk =

Polish indologist

Maryla Falk (26 September 1906 in Lviv – 13 June 1980 in Chamonix Mont Blanc) was a Polish indologist, sanskritist and religious scholar. A member of the Polish Oriental Society (1938) and a Fellow of the Royal Asiatic Society (1974), she is best remembered for her book Il mito psicologico nell’India antica (1939), reissued after her death by Adelphi Edizioni (1986) and translated into Polish (Mit psychologiczny w starożytnych Indiach, 2011). Maryla Falk is also known for her treatises l misteri di Novalis (1938) published in Naples, and Nāma-rūpa and Dharma-rūpa. Origin and Aspects of an Ancient Indian Conception (1943) published at the University of Calcutta.
