= John Bonomy =

Scottish footballer

Personal information
- Full name: John Bonomy
- Date of birth: 11 March 1918
- Place of birth: Dalziel, Scotland
- Date of death: 27 June 1980 (aged 62)
- Place of death: Isle of Arran, Scotland
- Position: Right back

Senior career*
Years	Team	Apps	(Gls)
- Royal Albert
–1936	Carluke Rovers		
1936–1939	Queen's Park	39	(7)
1939–1946	Motherwell	0	(0)
1940	→ Partick Thistle (guest)	11	(1)
1946	Raith Rovers		

International career
1938–1939	Scotland Amateurs	4	(0)
- * Club domestic league appearances and goals

John Bonomy (11 March 1918 – 27 June 1980) was a Scottish amateur football right back who played in the Scottish League for Queen's Park. He was capped by Scotland at amateur level.
