= Irmgard Fuest =

Irmgard Fuest (born Irmgard Scherer; September 6, 1903, in Münstermaifeld – June 22, 1980, in Neunkirchen) was a Saarland politician of the CVP / CDU and lawyer. She completed her legal traineeship at the Court of Appeals and passed her second state examination in 1931, then she worked as a judge at Brühl District Court and as a lawyer in Cologne. In 1935, she founded a law firm in Neunkirchen together with her husband Josef Fuest. She was the first woman to become a judicial councilor in the Federal Republic.

In 1975, Fuest was awarded the Saarland Order of Merit.
