= Olivia Sophie L'Ange Shipp =

American musician (1880–1980)

- Also known as: Olivia Porter
- Born: Olivia Sophie L'Ange Shipp; May 17, 1880; New Orleans, United States
- Died: June 18, 1980 (aged 100) New York City, United States
- Genres: Classical, Ragtime, Jazz
- Occupation: Musician
- Instruments: Piano, bass violin, cello, string bass

Olivia Sophie L'Ange Shipp (also known as Olivia Porter, May 17, 1880 – June 18, 1980) was a multi-instrumentalist known primarily as a bass violinist. She performed in dance bands, jazz bands, chamber music ensembles and orchestras in New York City and other parts of the United States. She was also a founder of the Negro Women's Orchestral and Civic Association.

== Early life and education ==
Olivia Shipp's first musical instrument was a comb and tissue paper. While still a child, she taught herself to play on an old pump organ given to her family by a local minister's wife and then began playing for the junior choir at church. She also went on to take voice lessons from Abbey Lyons, who was a member of the Fisk Jubilee Singers. Her sister, May Kemp, who was also a musician, as well as an actress, left New Orleans to join the Black Patti Troubadours and then to form the Bob and Kemp vaudeville act in New York City. Shipp joined her there and began working in vaudeville while also studying piano. She performed as a pianist, cellist and bassist under the name Olivia Porter, until her marriage when she began to use her married name. Both sisters chose professional names different from their actual surnames, because working in entertainment was considered by their parents to be disreputable.

After hearing a cello and piano performance, Shipp began trading piano for cello lessons with cellists she was accompanying. Soon, she bought her own cello and began studying with Paul Turkisher. When Turkisher left New York, Shipp began studying with Black cellists Wesley Johnson and Leonard Jeter (band leader, composer, and cellist in the Shuffle Along Orchestra). She then joined the Martin-Smith Music School, where she served as Jeter's assistant and became a member of the school's orchestra. While at the school she also studied bass violin with Umberto Buldrini (a double bass player with the New York Philharmonic). During this time she participated in radio performances as part of black violinist Charles Elgar's ensemble and performed with an all-female trio.

== Career ==
Shipp went on to play string bass with Marie Lucas's Lafayette Theatre Ladies' Orchestra, as a replacement for bassist Nellie Shelton. She frequently sat in with other bands, and accompanied rag pianist and band leader Charles Luckyeth "Luckey" Roberts and violinist/pianist/band leader Allie Ross, among others. In the 1920s, Shipp organized her own group, Olivia Shipp's Jazzmines—Famous Female Orchestra, specializing in "Music for All Occasions."

She was an active participant in community activities and was a founding member and president of the Negro Women's Orchestral and Civic Association. The city's first civic orchestra, the Negro Women's Orchestral and Civic Association was established with the help of American Federation of Musicians Local 802 and U.S. Representative (and future New York City mayor) Fiorello La Guardia. Shipp and her Jazzmines also performed at civic events, receptions, and charity benefits (for organizations like the Colored Artists Guild of America, and the Harlem Home for the Blind) and led the Harlem chapter of the Girl Scout Council of Greater New York.
