= Jack Murrell =

Australian rules footballer, born 1901

Personal information
- Full name: John William Murrell
- Born: 23 June 1901; Geelong, Victoria
- Died: 3 June 1980 (aged 78); Adelaide, South Australia
- Height: 175 cm (5 ft 9 in)
- Weight: 74 kg (163 lb)

Playing career^{1}
Years	Club	Games (Goals)
1920–22	Geelong	36 (0)
1925	New Town (Tas)	
1926	Norwood (SANFL)	8 (0)
- ^{1} Playing statistics correct to the end of 1922.

John William Murrell (23 June 1901 – 3 June 1980) was an Australian rules footballer who played with Geelong in the Victorian Football League (VFL).

== Family ==
The son of Ambrose Murrell (1856-1946), and Helen Harriet Murrell (1861-1948), née Cuthbertson, John William Murrell was born at Geelong on 23 June 1901.

He married Beatrice Alice "Trixie" Calvert (1903-1990), at St John's Anglican Church, New Town, Tasmania, on 30 December 1926.

== Education ==
He was educated at the Geelong High School and the Gordon Institute of Technology.

== Engineer ==
He was a qualified hydraulic engineer.

== Military service ==
He also served in the Navy in World War I.

== Death ==
He died in Adelaide on 3 June 1980.
