= Norman Hardy (cricketer, born 1907) =

English cricketer (1907–1980)

Personal information
- Full name: Norman Whittaker Hardy
- Born: 3 June 1907; Wakefield, Yorkshire, England
- Died: 2 June 1980 (aged 72) at sea, aboard SS Canberra
- Batting: Unknown
- Bowling: Unknown-arm fast-medium

Career statistics
Competition	First-class
Matches	1
Runs scored	14
Batting average	14.00
100s/50s	–/–
Top score	8*
Balls bowled	161
Wickets	4
Bowling average	22.75
5 wickets in innings	–
10 wickets in match	–
Best bowling	3/48
Catches/stumpings	2/–
- Source: Cricinfo, 25 July 2019

Norman Whittaker Hardy (3 June 1907 – 2 June 1980) was an English first-class cricketer.

Hardy, who was born at Wakefield in June 1907, made a single appearance in first-class cricket for H. D. G. Leveson-Gower's XI against Cambridge University at Eastbourne in 1926. Batting twice in the match, he was dismissed for 6 runs in their first-innings by Edward Cawston, while in their second-innings he finished not out on 8. Opening the bowling in the Cambridge first-innings, he took the wicket of Denys Wilcox to finish with innings figures of 1 for 43, while in their second-innings he dismissed Wilcox, Ken Farnes and Joseph Comber, to finish with innings figures of 3 for 48. He died at sea on board the cruise ship Canberra in June 1980, a day shy of his 73rd birthday.
