= Lawrence Anionwu =

Nigerian administrator

- Born: 5 May 1921; Onitsha, Colony and Protectorate of Nigeria
- Died: 12 June 1980 (aged 59); London, England, UK
- Resting place: Onitsha
- Spouse: Regina Anionwu
- Father: Julius Osakwe Anionwu

Lawrence Odiatu Victor Anionwu (5 May 1921 – 12 June 1980) was a Nigerian administrator and diplomat. He was the first Nigerian Permanent Secretary of the Ministry of Foreign Affairs and Nigeria's first Ambassador to Italy.

== Early life ==
Anionwu was born on 5 May 1921 in Onitsha in Anambra State. His father was Julius Osakwe Anionwu.

== Education ==
After his elementary education, Anionwu attended King's College, Lagos. He later studied at Trinity Hall, Cambridge, England where he graduated with an MA degree in 1946, and an LLB in 1948, and was called to Bar at Lincoln's Inn, London in the same year.

== Career ==
Anionwu returned to Nigeria in 1949 and started a private legal practice at Jos, Plateau State. At the same time, he served on the Jos Township Advisory Board, the Provincial Education Committee, the Provincial Liquor Board, and the Jos Local Education Committee. During that time, he was also the Manager of the Jos Township School and President of the Jos Club. In the late 1950s, he returned to Onitsha and was appointed as the British administration's Senior Crown Counsel of the Eastern Region Government.

On the eve of independence in 1960, he was appointed to the Federal Public Service. Thus, he became the first Nigerian administrator to be appointed with the primary purpose of redirecting the work of a government department to meet the requirement of a newly independent country. He was sent to the Royal College of Defence Studies in London for more training. When he returned to Lagos, he was posted to the Ministry of Foreign Affairs, serving as the first Nigerian Permanent Secretary from 1960 until 1963. In 1964, he was assigned to open the Nigeria Embassy in Italy where he was Nigeria's first representative. In 1967, he was to go to London as High Commissioner, but his diplomatic career was terminated by the civil war in Nigeria.

== Later life ==
Anionwu retired from the public service when the civil war ended in 1970, but continued to make contributions towards community development in his home town, Onitsha. Among the projects he was involved in was the reconstruction of the Emmanuel Church. He also served on the Board of the Central Water Transportation Service in Onitsha.

== Personal life ==
Anionwu was married to Regina Anionwu. He was reunited with his daughter Elizabeth Anionwu, whose mother Mary Furlong was Irish, 8 years before his death.

== Death ==
Anionwu died from a stroke in London on 12 June 1980. His body was flown to Onitsha for burial.
