= 1981 in association football =

The following are the association football events of the year 1981 throughout the world.

== Events ==
- 1981 Copa Libertadores: Won by Flamengo after defeating Cobreloa on the playoff match 2–0.
- 1980–81 European Cup: Won by Liverpool FC after defeating Real Madrid in final match 1–0.
- World Club Championship: Won by Flamengo after defeating Liverpool FC on a single match 3–0.
- March 25 – Kees Rijvers makes his debut as the manager of Dutch national team with a 1–0 win in the World Cup Qualifier against France. One player makes his debut for the Dutch: defender Edo Ophof from Ajax Amsterdam.
- September 1 – Dutch striker Wim Kieft makes his debut for the Netherlands national football team in the friendly against Switzerland. It's the 400th game in the history of the Dutch national team.

== Winners club national championship ==
=== Asia ===
- Qatar – Al-Sadd SC

=== Europe ===
- Albania – KF Partizani Tirana
- Austria – Austria Wien
- Belgium – R.S.C. Anderlecht
- Bulgaria – CSKA Sofia
- Cyprus – AC Omonoia
- Czechoslovakia – Baník Ostrava
- Denmark – Hvidovre IF
- East Germany – Dynamo Berlin
- England – Aston Villa
- Faroe Islands – HB Torshavn
- Finland – HJK Helsinki
- France – AS Saint-Étienne
- Greece – Olympiacos F.C.
- Hungary – Ferencváros
- Iceland – Vikingur
- Ireland – Athlone Town A.F.C.
- Italy – Juventus
- Luxembourg – Progrès Niedercorn
- Malta – Hibernians F.C.
- Netherlands – AZ Alkmaar
- Northern Ireland – Glentoran F.C.
- Norway – Vålerenga IF
- Poland – Widzew Łódź
- Portugal – Benfica
- Romania – Universitatea Craiova
- Scotland – Celtic F.C.
- Spain – Real Sociedad
- Sweden – Östers IF
- Switzerland – FC Zürich
- Turkey – Trabzonspor
- Soviet Union – FC Dynamo Kiev
- West Germany – Bayern Munich
- Yugoslavia – Red Star Belgrade

=== North America ===
- Mexico – UNAM
- United States / Canada –
  - Chicago Sting (NASL)

=== Oceania ===
- Australia – Sydney Slickers

=== South America ===
- Argentina
  - Metropolitano – Boca Juniors
  - Nacional – River Plate
- Bolivia – Jorge Wilstermann
- Brazil – Grêmio
- Chile – Colo-Colo
- Colombia – Atlético Nacional
- Ecuador – Barcelona
- Paraguay Paraguay – Olimpia Asunción
- Peru – FBC Melgar
- Uruguay – Peñarol
- Venezuela – Deportivo Táchira

== International tournaments ==
- Mundialito in Montevideo, Uruguay (December 30, 1980 – January 10, 1981)
  1. Uruguay
  2. Brazil
- 1981 British Home Championship (May 16–23, 1981)

Abandoned following severe civil unrest in Northern Ireland.

== National teams ==
=== Netherlands ===
Date	Opponent	Final Score	Result	Competition	Venue
January 6	Italy	1–1	D	Mundialito	Estadio Centenario, Montevideo
February 22	Cyprus	3–0	W	World Cup Qualifier	Oosterpark Stadion, Groningen
March 25	France	1–0	W	World Cup Qualifier	De Kuip, Rotterdam
April 29	Cyprus	0–1	W	World Cup Qualifier	Makario Stadium, Nicosia
March 26	Switzerland	2–1	L	Friendly	Hardturm, Zürich
September 9	Republic of Ireland	2–2	D	World Cup Qualifier	De Kuip, Rotterdam
October 14	Belgium	3–0	W	World Cup Qualifier	De Kuip, Rotterdam
November 18	France	2–0	L	World Cup Qualifier	Parc des Princes, Paris

== Movies ==
- Escape to Victory

== Births ==
- January 1 – Mladen Petrić, Croatian international
- January 2
  - Hanno Balitsch, German footballer
  - Maxi Rodríguez, Argentine footballer
- January 9 – Ebi Smolarek, Polish international
- January 10 – James Coppinger, English club footballer
- January 15 – El Hadji Diouf, Senegalese international
- January 19 – Lucho González, Argentine international
- January 20 – Owen Hargreaves, Canadian-born English footballer
- January 21
  - Ivan Ergić, Serbian footballer
  - Roberto Guana Italian footballer
  - Mohd Amri Yahyah, Malaysian international
- January 23 – Lee Dong-geun, South Korean former footballer
- January 25
  - Rodrigo Calaça, Brazilian footballer
  - Dmitry Izvekov, former Russian professional footballer
- January 26 – Fernando Curcio, Uruguayan footballer
- January 28 – Thomas Schlieter, German footballer
- January 30
  - Dimitar Berbatov, Bulgarian footballer
  - Afonso Alves, Brazilian footballer
  - Peter Crouch, English footballer
- February 13
  - Durahim Jamaluddin, Malaysian international (d. 2018)
  - Liam Miller, Irish international (d. 2018)
- February 18 – Ivan Sproule, Northern Ireland international
- February 21 – Nery Fernández, Paraguayan former professional footballer
- February 23 – Gareth Barry, English footballer
- February 24
  - Felipe Baloy, Panamanian international
  - Mauro Rosales, Argentinian footballer
- February 25 – Park Ji Sung, South Korea footballer
- February 27 – Alessandro Rottoli, Italian professional footballer
- March 9 – Didi Longuet, former professional footballer
- March 10 – Samuel Eto'o, Cameroonian international
- March 15 – Aymen Mnafeg, Tunisian footballer
- March 16 – Johannes Aigner, Austrian footballer
- March 18 – Cristián Basaure, Chilean former footballer
- March 19
  - Maksim Arap, former Russian footballer
  - Matt Haddrell, English footballer
  - Kolo Touré, Ivorian footballer
- March 27 – Terry McFlynn, British footballer
- March 29 – Jlloyd Samuel, Trinidadian footballer (d. 2018)
- March 31 – Wolfgang Bubenik, Austrian footballer
- April 8 – Cédric Faivre, French professional football
- April 9 – Ireneusz Jeleń, Polish international
- April 12 – Nicolás Burdisso, Argentinian footballer
- April 29 – George McCartney, Northern Ireland international
- May 7 – Azrine Effendy Sa'duddin, Malaysian footballer
- May 8
  - Andrea Barzagli, Italian footballer
  - Sam Ketsekile, Mosotho footballer
  - Shimane Kgope Ntshweu, Botswana footballer
- May 13 – Carciano, Brazilian footballer
- May 15 – Patrice Evra, Senegalese-born French international
- May 27 – Johan Elmander, Swedish footballer
- May 31
  - Josefine Krengel, German footballer
  - Neddy Rose, Seychellois footballer
- June 4 – Giourkas Seitaridis, Greek international
- June 10 – Burton O'Brien, Scottish footballer
- June 13 – Danny Curran, English former footballer
- June 16 – David Buxo, Andorran footballer
- June 17 – Doddy Édouard, Mauritian footballer
- June 18 – Denis Shevelev, former Russian professional footballer
- June 21 – İbrahim Öztürk, Turkish club footballer
- June 22
  - Mathias Abel, German footballer
  - Péter Bajzát, Hungarian footballer
  - Ronald Spuller, Austrian retired professional footballer
- June 23 – Björn Schlicke, German youth international
- June 27
  - Jennifer Molina, Mexican female footballer
  - Jean-Renaud Nemouthé, French retired footballer
  - Cléber Santana, Brazilian footballer (d. 2016)
- July 2 – Baptiste Lafleuriel, former French professional footballer
- July 10 – Aleksandar Tunchev, Bulgarian international
- July 14 – Khaled Aziz, Saudi Arabian midfielder
- July 16 – Paulo (Gideon Paulo da Silva), Brazilian footballer
- July 19 – Anderson Luiz de Carvalho, Brazilian club footballer
- July 20 – Damien Delaney, Irish footballer
- July 28 – Michael Carrick, English footballer
- July 30 – Bruno Parente, retired Portuguese footballer
- August 4 – Hadson, Brazilian midfielder
- August 8 – Witold Sabela, Polish former professional footballer
- August 10 – Malek Mouath, Saudi Arabian footballer
- August 12 – Oliver Đokić, Serbian footballer
- August 21 – Benjamín Ruiz, Chilean footballer
- August 24 – Mickaël Germain, Guadelopean former professional footballer
- August 27 – Fernando Martín, Spanish footballer (d. 2025)
- September 1
  - Mana Nopnech, Thai retired professional footballer
  - Maksim Rybalko, former Russian professional football player
- September 9 – Pacheta (Héctor Carrasco Rojo), Spanish professional footballer
- September 11 – Victor Kros, Dutch footballer
- September 22 – Alma Martinéz, Mexican female footballer
- September 23 – Jay Murray, English footballer
- October 1 – Ivan Semenets, former Russian professional footballer
- October 3
  - Zlatan Ibrahimović, Swedish footballer
  - Andreas Isaksson, Swedish football goalkeeper
  - Iván Pailós, Uruguayan footballer
- October 6 – Mikael Dorsin, Swedish footballer
- October 8 – Chris Killen, New Zealand international
- October 9 – Ryoichi Maeda, Japanese international
- October 12 - Shola Ameobi, Nigerian international
- October 13 - Koen Brack, Dutch footballer
- October 21 - Yohan Viola, Dominican Republic footballer
- October 23
  - Marcin Folc, Polish footballer
  - Olivier Occéan, Canadian international
- October 24 – Soeris Baidjoe, Dutch footballer
- October 28 – Milan Baroš, Czech footballer
- November 8 – Joe Cole, English footballer
- November 20
  - Espen Hoff, Norwegian footballer
  - İbrahim Toraman, Turkish international footballer
- November 21 – Martin van Leeuwen, Dutch footballer
- November 22 – Seweryn Gancarczyk, Polish international
- November 25 – Xabi Alonso, Spanish international
- December 3 – David Villa, Spanish footballer
- December 3
  - Ioannis Amanatidis, Greek footballer
  - Aleksandr Galakhov, former Russian professional footballer
- December 6 – Gil Ferreira, Brazilian footballer
- December 12 – Federico Tafani, Italian footballer
- December 20 – Leo Bertos, New Zealand international
- December 21 – Cristian Zaccardo, Italian international defender
- December 28 – Khalid Boulahrouz, Dutch footballer
- December 30 – Umar Karsanov, former Russian professional footballer
- December 31 – Dadi Mayuma, Congolese former footballer

== Deaths ==
=== January ===
- January 29 – Lajos Korányi, Hungarian international (b. 1907)

=== May ===
- May 9 – Ralph Allen, English club footballer (b. 1906)
- May 14 – Michele Andreolo, Italian midfielder, winner of the 1938 FIFA World Cup. (68)

=== June ===
- June 21 – Alberto Suppici, Uruguayan midfielder, winner of the 1930 FIFA World Cup as manager. (82)

=== August ===
- August 15 – Carlo Buscaglia, Italian footballer (born 1900)

=== September ===
- September 22 – Néstor Carballo, Uruguayan international footballer (born 1929)

=== October ===
- October 9 – František Fadrhonc (66), Czech football manager (born 1914)

=== November ===
- November 3 – Eraldo Monzeglio, Italian defender, winner of the 1934 FIFA World Cup and 1938 FIFA World Cup. (75)

=== December ===
- December 4 – Zoilo Saldombide, Uruguayan striker, winner of the 1930 FIFA World Cup. (76)
