= Dadi =

Dadi may refer to:

== Places ==
- Dadi (community development block), Jharkhand, India
- Dadi, China, part of the Fujian tulou World Heritage site
- Dadi, Iran, a village in Hormozgan Province, Iran
- Dadi, the old name of the town of Amfikleia in Central Greece

== People ==
- Daði, an Icelandic given name
- Dadi (given name), an Indian given name
- Dadi (surname)

== Other uses ==
- Dadi Auto, a Chinese company
- Dadı, a Turkish TV series
- Dadi (instrument), a type of dizi, a Chinese flute

== See also ==
- Daði (disambiguation)
- Daddy (disambiguation)
- Dhadi (disambiguation)
