= Buxó (surname) =

Buxó (or Buxo) is the surname of:

- Tomàs Buxó (born 1882), Spanish composer
- Zoraida Buxó (born 1963), Puerto Rican politician currently serving as a Shadow United States Senator
- David Buxo (born 1981), Andorran football player

== See also ==
- Bux (surname)
