= Némouthé =

Némouthé (or Nemouthé) is a surname. Notable people with the surname include:

- Thomas Némouthé (born 2001), French footballer
- Jean-Renaud Nemouthé (born 1981), French footballer
