= Rybalko =

Rybalko (Russian: Рыбалко, Ukrainian: Рибалко) is a gender-neutral Ukrainian surname that may refer to

- Aida Rybalko (born 1990), Lithuanian figure skater
- Maksim Rybalko (born 1981), Russian football player
- Pavel Rybalko (1892–1948), Soviet military commander
- Viktoriya Rybalko (born 1982), Ukrainian long jumper
