= Tafari =

Tafari is a surname. Notable people with the surname include:

- Jack Tafari (1946–2016), British-American homelessness activist
- Levi Tafari, British actor and poet
- Tafari Moore (born 1997), English footballer

== See also ==
- Teferi, a variant name
- Haile Selassie, birth name Tafari Makonnen Woldemikael
- Rastafari
- Tafani
