= Tafani =

Tafani is a surname. Notable people with the surname include:

- Federico Tafani (born 1981), Italian footballer
- Jérôme Tafani (born 1958), French businessman

== See also ==
- Tafari
