= Nicole Becker =

Argentine climate activist

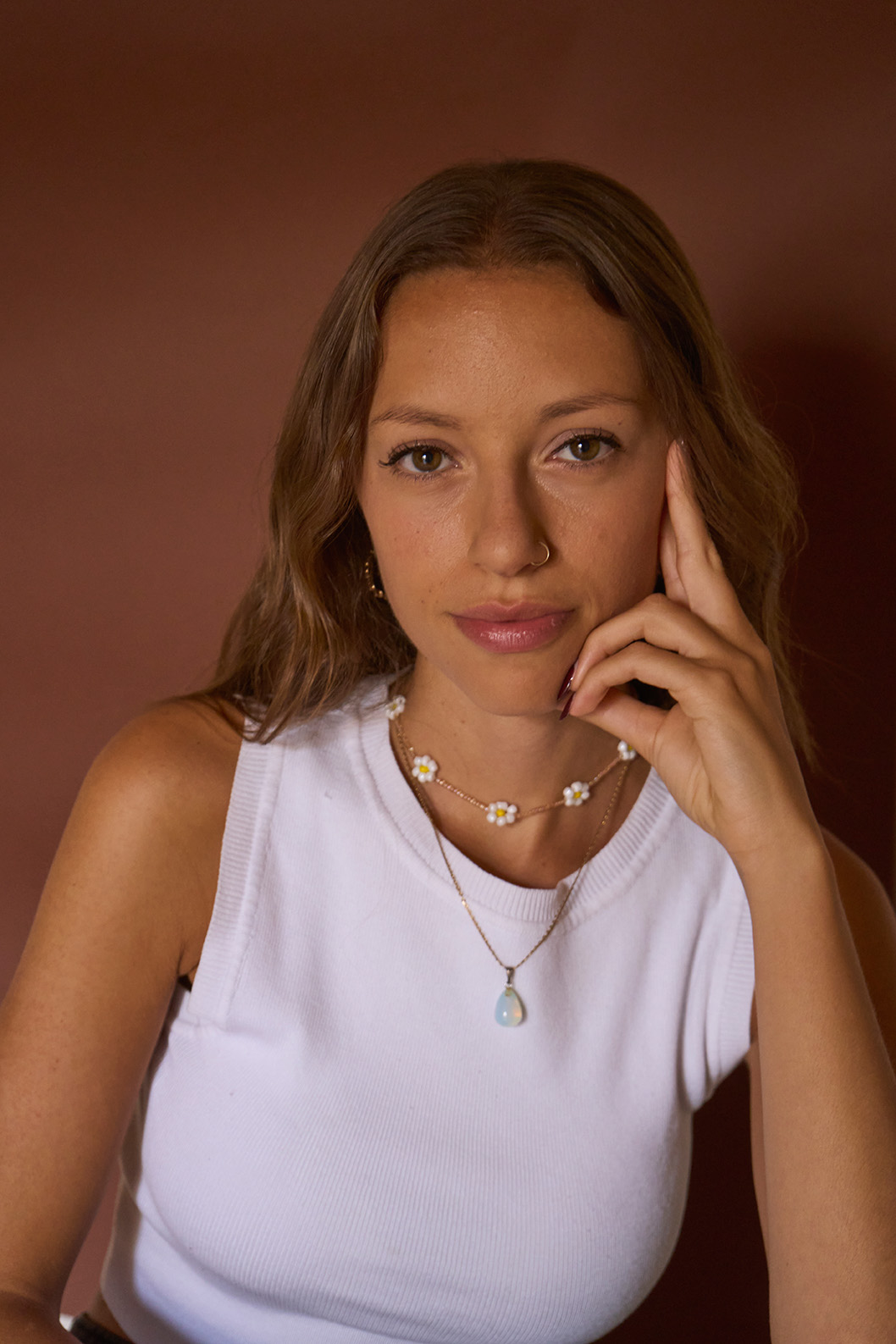
Portrait of Nicola Becker

Nicole "Nicki" Becker (Buenos Aires) is a climate activist from Argentina and one of the founders of Jóvenes por el Clima, part of the Fridays for Future movement. Becker became the youth champion for Escazu Agreement and Sanitation and Water for All (SWA) in 2021.

== Background and education ==
Becker is the daughter of a father who is a criminal lawyer and a mother who is a math teacher and lives in Caballito. After realizing climate change had social ramifications as well as environmental ones, Becker changed her course in college from psychology to international law in her first year. She is currently studying law at the University of Buenos Aires.

== Activism ==
Since she was eight years old, Becker already joined Habonim Dror and was also part of Ni una menos. Her environmental activism started in February 2019 when she saw an Instagram video of young people doing a climate march in Europe, and Greta Thunberg became the center of the topic. Because the first International March for the Climate Crisis was held on March 15, 2019, Becker, Bruno Rodriguez, and their other three friends decided to find Jóvenes por el Clima, a part of Youth Climate, by the end of February 2019. They decided to arrange the march in Argentina, joined by 5,000 people after founding the organization. The organization has been pushing Argentina to do the Climate and Ecological Emergency Declaration. The government finally declared on 17 July 2019. In 2019, she received a grant to attend the UN Climate Conference in Madrid on behalf of the Argentine youth. As part of the UnaSolaGeneración campaign on World Children's Day by UNICEF and America Solidaria to promote climate change to youngsters around Latin America and the Caribbean during the COVID-19 pandemic, Becker became one of the representatives. In 2019, Becker came to the 2019 United Nations Climate Change Conference under the grant as a youth representative for Argentina. Later, she returned to the 2021 United Nations Climate Change Conference and met with UN Secretary-General Antonio Guterres.

== Honor ==
The Chamber of Deputies gave her a diploma and medal to honor her contribution to social action on 10 March 2020. The Access Initiative (TAI), the United Nations Economic Commission for Latin America and the Caribbean (UN ECLAC), and the Government of Costa Rica appointed Becker as one of the five youth champions succeeding David R. Boyd on the second anniversary of the Escazu Agreement as UNICEF Youth Advocates in 2020. In 2021, she was chosen as "Young Champion of the program" by the SWA.

== Career ==
Becker became a host of the Futurock radio program titled Permitido pisar el pasto with Rodriguez. She is also a columnist for El Diario.
