= Galakhov =

Galakhov (masculine, Russian: Галахов) or Galakhova (feminine, Russian: Галахова) is a Russian surname. Notable people with the surname include:

- Aleksandr Galakhov (born 1981), Russian soccer player
- Alexey Galakhov (1807–1892), Russian author and literary historian
- Nikolai Galakhov (born 1928), Russian artist
