= Bruno Rodrigues =

Bruno Rodrigues may refer to:

- Bruno Rodrigues (footballer, born 1997), Brazilian football forward for Cruzeiro
- Bruno Rodrigues (footballer, born 2001), Portuguese football defender for Braga

== See also ==
- Bruno Rodríguez (disambiguation)
- Bruno Parente (born 1981), born Bruno Alexandre Parente Rodrigues, Portuguese football defender
- Bruno Luiz (born 1984), born Bruno Luiz de Almeida Rodrigues, Brazilian football forward
