= Francisco Vera (activist) =

Colombian activist

Javier Vera
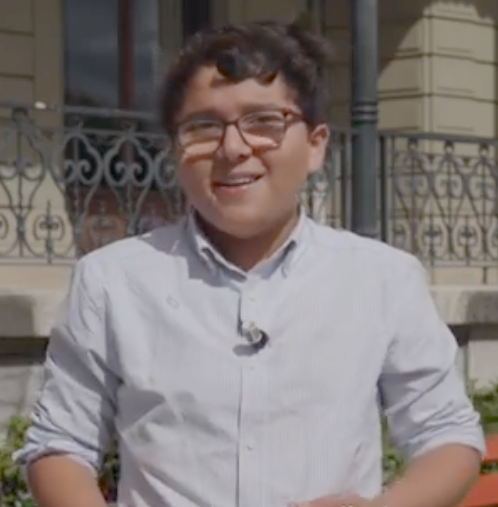
- In a UNOHCHR video in 2025
- Born: Francisco Javier Vera Manzanares; 22 July 2009 (age 17); Colombia
- Known for: Environmental activism

Francisco Javier Vera Manzanares (born 22 July 2009) is a climate change activist from Colombia. He has received numerous death threats because of his activism. Ex-President Ivan Duque of Colombia has promised the government will find the "bandits" behind Twitter messages threatening Francisco.

Francisco is the creator of Conversaciones con Francisco, an Instagram series of Instagram Live where he chats with relevant people around the world making a change.

== Activism ==
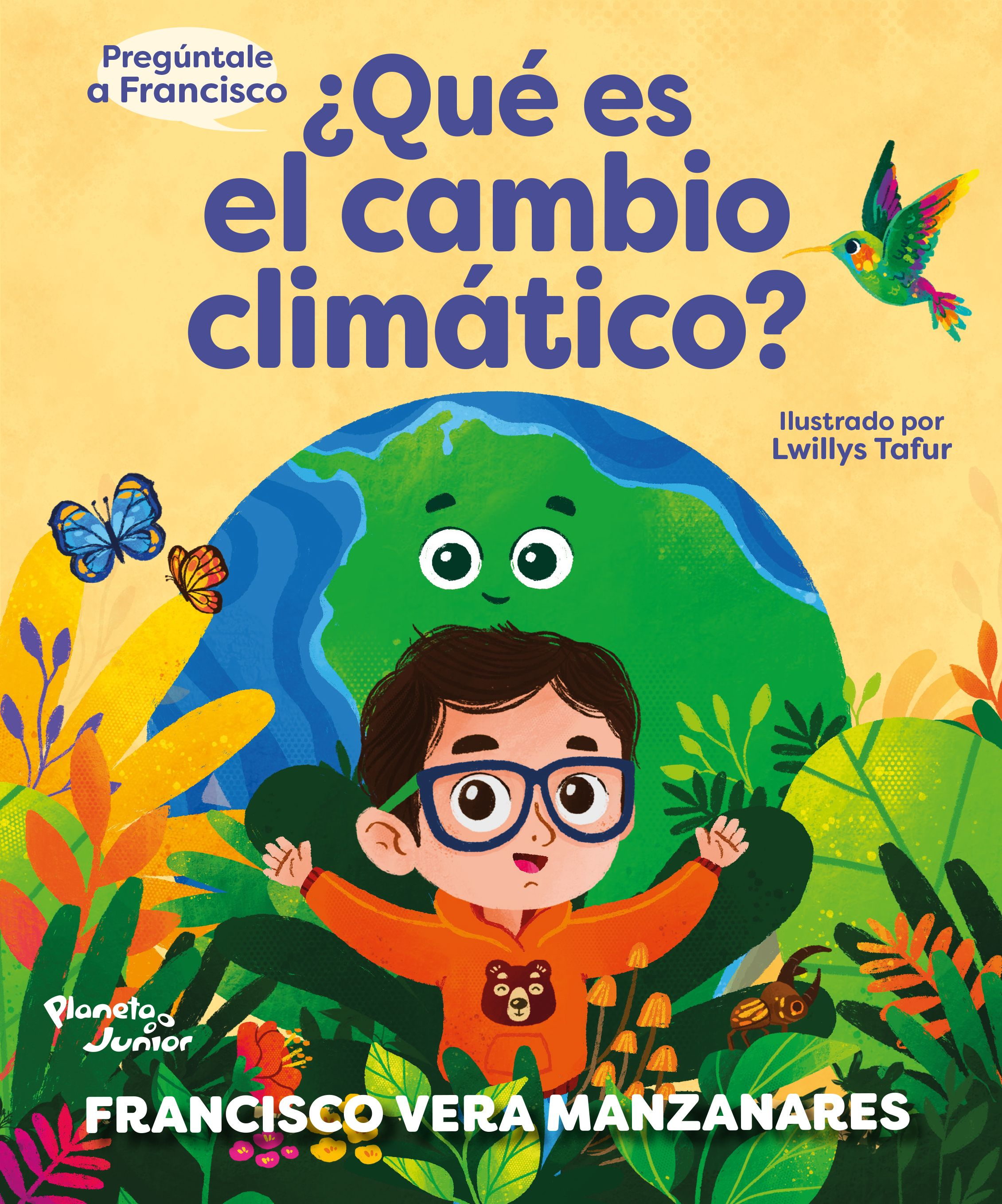
A children's book about climate change written by Vera

In November 2021 Francisco participated in the 2021 United Nations Climate Change Conference where he met Greta Thunberg. He has also met with Iván Duque Márquez, expresident of Colombia, to discuss the Escazú Agreement.

He is the founder of Guardianes por la Vida, a social movement of children fighting against climate change.
