= Bruno Rodríguez =

Bruno Rodríguez may refer to:

- Bruno Rodriguez (activist) Argentine climate activist
- Bruno Rodriguez (footballer) (born 1972), French footballer
- Bruno Rodríguez (tennis) (born 1986), Mexican tennis player
- Bruno Rodríguez Parrilla (born 1958), Cuban politician

== See also ==
- Bruno Rodrigues (disambiguation)
