= Migjen Basha =

Albanian footballer (born 1987)

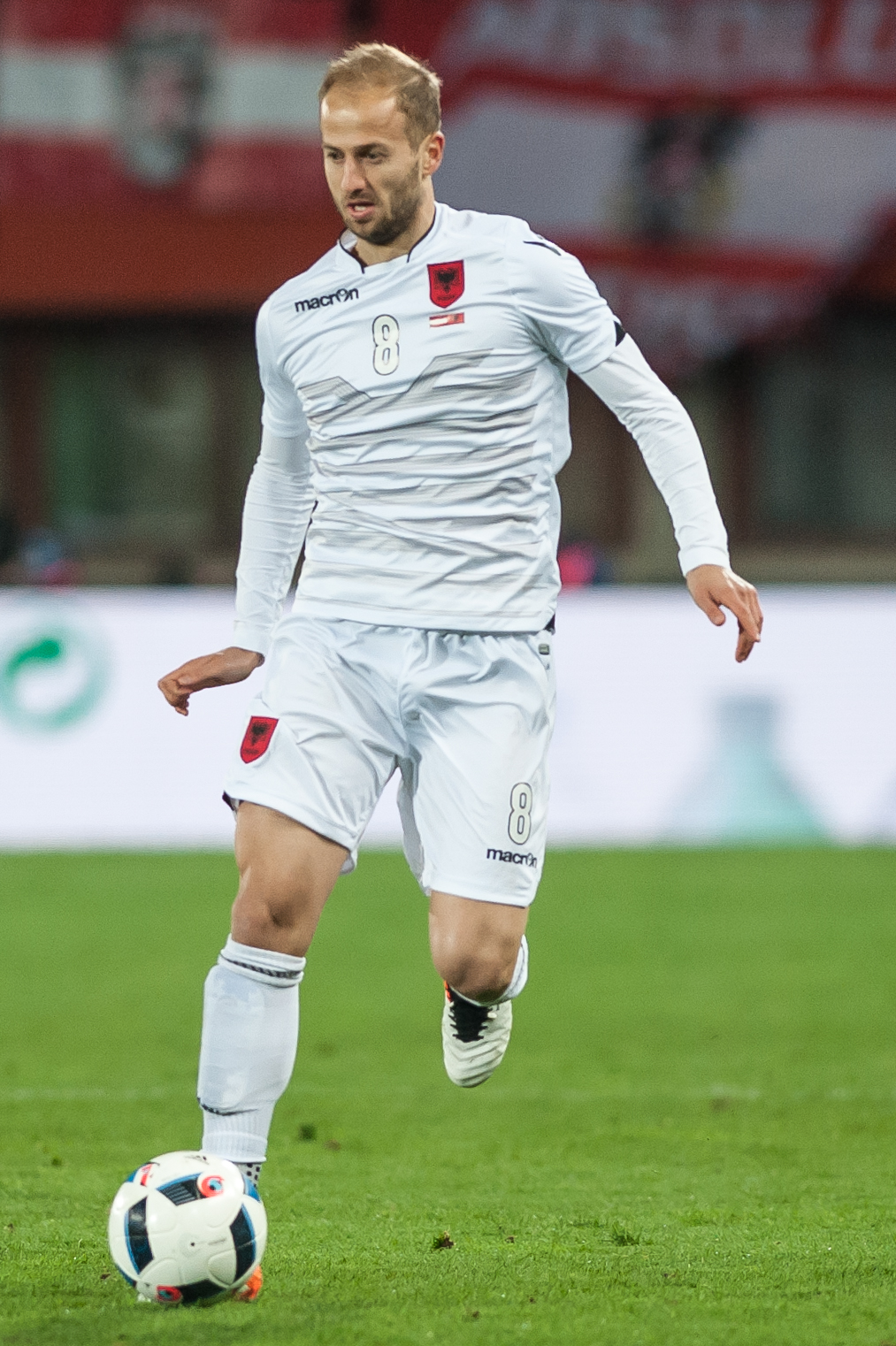
- Basha with Albania in March 2016

Personal information
- Date of birth: 5 January 1987 (age 39)
- Place of birth: Lausanne, Switzerland
- Height: 1.80 m (5 ft 11 in)
- Position: Defensive midfielder

Team information
- Current team: Lausanne-Sport (interim manager)

Youth career
- 1999–????: Dardania Lausanne
- 2004: Team Vaud
- 2004: Lausanne

Senior career*
Years	Team	Apps	(Gls)
2004–2005	Lausanne	36	(4)
2006–2007	Lucchese	13	(0)
2007–2008	Viareggio	15	(1)
2008–2009	Rimini	52	(3)
2009–2010	Frosinone	38	(3)
2010–2012	Atalanta	23	(0)
2011–2012	→ Torino (loan)	36	(2)
2012–2015	Torino	51	(2)
2015–2016	Luzern	7	(0)
2016	→ Como (loan)	13	(1)
2016–2018	Bari	59	(3)
2018–2019	Aris	21	(0)
2019–2020	Melbourne Victory	25	(1)
2020–2021	Neuchâtel Xamax FCS	24	(0)
Total		413	(20)

International career
2004–2005	Switzerland U17	1	(0)
2006–2007	Switzerland U18	6	(1)
2006–2007	Switzerland U19	7	(0)
2007–2008	Switzerland U21	1	(0)
2013–2019	Albania	33	(3)

Managerial career
- 2026: Lausanne-Sport (interim)
- * Club domestic league appearances and goals

Migjen Basha (born 5 January 1987) is a former professional footballer who played as a defensive midfielder, and most recently interim manager of Lausanne-Sport.

Born in Switzerland, he represented that nation at youth international levels but played for Albania at senior level.

== Early life and youth career ==
Basha was born in Lausanne, Switzerland, to Kosovar Albanian parents who were originally from Theranda (also called Suhareka) and is the elder brother of Vullnet Basha, who is also a professional footballer. Basha went to Theranda for the first time in his early childhood to learn the Albanian language and attended the elementary school for several years. He returned to Lausanne before the Kosovo war broke out. During the war, his childhood home was burned to the ground and Basha's uncle was killed. Those events had left a profound mark on his life.

Basha started his youth career as an infant and aged 11 joined the local team Dardania Lausanne, an amateur football club founded by the Albanian community in Lausanne, coached by Agim Cana. Then he moved at an amateur club called Team Vaud, and in 2004 he moved to Lausanne. In his first year at Lausanne, Basha gained entry to the first team.

== Club career ==
=== Lausanne ===
He made his professional debut at the age 18, on 16 July 2005 in the 2005–06 season, in the match against Winterthur, which ended in a 5–4 victory for Lausanne, with Basha entering as a substitute in the 60th minute in place of Patrick Isabella. He scored his first goal in his third match appearance two weeks later, on 30 July 2005 in a 4–1 victory over Luzern. Basha once again came in as a substitute in place of Isabella in the 68th minute, scoring in the 88th minute and bringing the score to 3–1.

=== Lucchese ===
For the second half of the 2005–06 season, Basha moved to Italy at Luccehse-Libertas in the Serie C1. He played in five matches until the end of the season. He played for Lucchese in eight matches in the 2006–07 season.

=== Viareggio ===
In 2007, Basha moved to Viareggio in Serie C2. He made a total of 15 appearances and scored 1 goal, only in the first half of the 2007–08 season.

=== Rimini ===
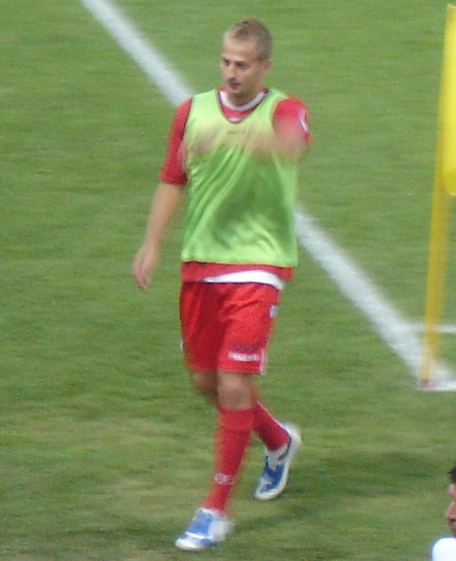
Basha with Rimini in 2009

For the second half of the 2007–08 season, Basha moved to Rimini. He played 12 matches for Rimini in the second half of the 2007–08 season, since he made his debut on 2 February 2008 in the away victory 0–1 against Bari, entering as a substitute in the 77th minute.

Basha began the 2008–09 season with a goal on 17 August 2008 against Ravenna in Coppa Italia. The match finished in a draw 3–3 and ended a penalty shoot-out, where Basha missed a penalty and finished in a penalty loss 5–7. He debuted with a goal in Serie B on 29 August, scoring the equalising goal against Parma, 1–1. He managed to score another two goals in the month of February against Treviso on 7 February, which finished in a draw 2–2, and on 28 February against Ancona, a 2–1 victory. He concluded the 2008–09 Serie B season with 38 appearances and 3 goals, and he also played in two-legged match against Ancona, where the first leg played on 6 June 2009 finished in the draw 1–1, and the second leg played a week later on 13 June finished in a 0–1, with Rimini relegated.

=== Frosinone ===
Basha transferred to Serie B club Frosinone. Basha made his first appearance for Frosinone on 21 August 2009 against Salernitana, where he scored his first goal for the club in a 1–2 victory. Basha would go on to make 38 appearances for the club and score three times. Basha helped Frosinone reach the fourth round of the Coppa Italia and scored a goal against Varese.

=== Atalanta ===
In June 2010, Atalanta, which had just been relegated from the Serie A, acquired Basha from Frosinone. Basha made his debut for Atalanta on 21 August 2010 against Vicenza, playing the full 90 minutes as the match finished in a 2–0 victory. During the 2010–11 season, he played 7 matches as a starter in total 23 appearances.

=== Torino ===
Basha was sent on a one-year loan at fellow Serie B club Torino on 13 July 2011. The Bull had the right to make the transfer permanent at the end of the season.

Basha made his Torino debut on 27 August in the 2–1 win over Ascoli, and opened his scoring account later on 10 December by scoring the opening goal of the 4–2 home win over Pescara. He finished his first Torino season by making 36 appearances and scoring 2 goals, as Torino finished runner-up in championship which ensured a spot to Serie A for the 2012–13 season. On 21 July 2012, Basha joined to Torino on co-ownership.

He made his first Serie A appearance in the opening matchday against Siena on 26 August, playing the last 14-minute of a goalless draw. Basha's first top flight goal came on 28 October in the 1–3 loss to Parma. He concluded the 2012–13 season with 21 appearances and 1 goal.

On 21 June 2013, Torino and Atalanta reached the deal to terminate the co-ownership for another €350,000, making Torino was the sole employer of Basha in the football field. Later in April 2014, during the league match at Genoa, Basha injured his achilles tendon which required surgery. He finished his third Torino season by making 25 appearances, including 24 in league.

Basha continued to be injured due to poor treatment by Torino medical staff, which lengthened his injury up to nine-month. This lead Basha to go and be treated by Bayern Munich medical staff Hans-Wilhelm Müller-Wohlfahrt. He was finally recovered in January 2015 made returned to the team for the match against Chievo on 6th.

He returned on the field for the first time in 11 months by entering in the last moments of the 1–0 home win versus Napoli. He wore the captain armband for the first time on 16 March in the 0–2 home loss to Lazio. Basha returned to the score-sheet the next weekend where he netted the second of the 0–2 away win against Parma; the second ever top flight for him.

On 30 June 2015, Basha officially left the club after his contract run out and the club decided not to extend it. He finished his Torino career by making 89 appearances between league and cup. He was described by Toro fans as a "Real Warrior".

=== Luzern ===
After spending nine years in Italy, Basha returned to Switzerland on a free transfer to FC Luzern on 10 August 2015. He ended his short spell with the club by totalling just 10 appearances between league and cup. He would later consider this move as the only blunder he's made in life, stating: "to return to Switzerland after playing for years Italy was just completely mistake." He also added that Swiss football was "not for him".

==== Loan to Como ====
On 4 February 2016, Como officially announced to have signed Basha on loan until the end of the 2015–16 season in order to gain more playing time ahead of UEFA Euro 2016. He made his debut nine days later, starting and playing 56 minutes in the 1–1 draw versus Novara. Despite the draw, Basha was distinguished for his performance in midfield. He scored his maiden goal for the club later on 7 May during the match versus Avellino, opening the score with an early header in an eventual 1–1 draw. Basha's spell at Como was fruitful, as he managed to regain his form ahead of the European Championship, making 13 appearances, all of them as starter, collecting 1020 minutes in the process. Como however was relegated after finishing last in the standing.

=== Bari ===
On 12 August 2016, Basha signed a two-year contract with Bari in Serie B.

=== Aris ===
On 14 July 2018, Basha agreed personal terms with Greek club Aris and signed a two-year contract worth €300,000 a season.

=== Melbourne Victory ===
On 19 September 2019, Basha joined A-League club Melbourne Victory FC on a two-year contract. He made his debut for Melbourne Victory in the Melbourne Derby on 12 October 2019, coming on as an 86th-minute substitute for fellow debutant Jakob Poulsen in an eventual 0–0 draw.

In August 2020, Basha left the Victory to return to Europe.

== International career ==
=== Switzerland ===
Basha has been a member of Switzerland youth teams, representing the Rossocrociati at under-17, -18, -19 and -21 levels.

=== Albania ===
Although capped for Switzerland at youth levels, in July 2010 Basha declared that he wanted to play for Albania instead. He said also that would apply for an Albanian passport in order to be eligible to play for the "Red and Blacks", but the Swiss Football Association did not agree Basha be able to play for another nation. After Basha publicly declared that he will never play for Switzerland, only Albania, on 30 July 2012 it was reported Basha would apply to receive an Albanian passport. On 21 August, it was reported Basha had acquired Albanian citizenship. However, FIFA had not yet authorized him to play for Albania. FIFA once ruled out the switch of nationality by outside his country of birth (or parent and grandparent's country of birth), however had opened the door for Irish from Northern Ireland to represent Republic of Ireland, which may apply to ethnic minority outside the boundary of modern political border.

Basha was called up to the Albania squad Gianni De Biasi on 15 March 2013 ahead of a match against Norway. On 19 March 2013, Basha and the Albanian Football Association (FSHF) received approval from FIFA allowing Basha to play for Albania.

==== 2014 FIFA World Cup qualifiers ====
On 22 March 2013, Basha debuted with Albania coincided in a 0–1 victory against Norway in Oslo, as part of 2014 FIFA World Cup qualification. Four days later, Basha scored his first goal for Albania in a friendly against Lithuania. Only two matches were enough and Albanian football opinion saw Basha as a replacement for the retired Altin Lala, according to his playing position and his abilities.

Basha's second goal for Albania came on 5 March 2014 in a 2–0 friendly win against Malta; Basha scored match's opening goal in the 26th minute.

==== UEFA Euro 2016 qualification ====
Exactly one year after his second goal and last call-up, following his return to Torino in an impressive form also playing as a starter and holding the captain's armband against Lazio, Basha returned to the national team as he received the call up by the coach Gianni De Biasi for the fourth match of the UEFA Euro 2016 qualifying Group I match against Armenia on 29 March 2015. On 18 March, De Biasi published a pre-list of 17 called up players and right after Basha became the 18th man to include in the pre-list squad.

Basha was called up again for the next international match on 13 June 2015 France in a Group I centralised friendly match. Being a friendly match, the coach Gianni De Biasi left out all starting trio consisted of Burim Kukeli–Taulant Xhaka–Amir Abrashi and Basha gained the chance to play it as a starter among Ergys Kaçe and Andi Lila to consist the central-midfielders trio in a historical successful 1–0 win against hosts of the UEFA Euro 2016 with a free-kick goal scored by Ergys Kaçe at the end of the first half in the 43rd minute.

==== Euro 2016 ====
On 21 May 2016, Basha was named in Albania's preliminary 27-man squad for UEFA Euro 2016, and in Albania's final 23-man UEFA Euro 2016 squad on 31 May.

Basha was an unused substitute in two first matches against Switzerland in a 0–1 loss and hosts France where they lost 2–0, then played as a starter in the next match against Romania in an Albania's historical 1–0 win. Albania finished the group in third place with three points gained and a goal difference of –2. However, Albania was ranked last in the third-placed teams, which meant it was eliminated.

== Managerial career ==
On 16 April 2026, Basha was appointed as interim head coach of Lausanne-Sport alongside Markus Neumayr, following the dismissal of Peter Zeidler due to poor results.

== Personal life ==
Following Albania's historic participation at UEFA Euro 2016, Basha was among the members of the national team who were issued diplomatic passports by the Albanian government in recognition of their achievement.

== Career statistics ==
=== Club ===
As of 6 April 2019

Club statistics
Club	Season	League			Cup		Europe (Note: Including continental competitions, such as UEFA Champions League and UEFA Europa League)		Other (Note: Including other competitions, such as 2008–09 Serie B Play-out)		Total	
Club	Season	Division	Apps	Goals	Apps	Goals	Apps	Goals	Apps	Goals	Apps	Goals
Lausanne	2004–05	1. Liga Promotion	22	3	—		—		—		22	3
Lausanne	2005–06	Swiss Challenge League	14	1	—		—		—		14	1
Lausanne	Total		36	4	—		—		—		36	4
Lucchese	2005–06	Serie C1	5	0	—		—		—		5	0
Lucchese	2006–07	Serie C1	8	0	—		—		—		8	0
Lucchese	Total		13	0	—		—		—		13	0
Viareggio	2007–08	Serie C2	15	1	—		—		—		15	1
Rimini	2007–08	Serie B	12	0	—		—		—		12	0
Rimini	2008–09	Serie B	38	2	1	1	—		2	0	41	3
Rimini	Total		50	2	1	1	—		2	0	53	3
Frosinone	2009–10	Serie B	38	3	3	1	—		—		41	4
Atalanta	2010–11	Serie B	23	0	2	0	—		—		25	0
Torino	2011–12	Serie B	36	2	1	0	—		—		37	2
Torino	2012–13	Serie A	21	1	0	0	—		—		21	1
Torino	2013–14	Serie A	24	0	1	0	—		—		25	0
Torino	2014–15	Serie A	6	1	0	0	—		—		6	1
Torino	Total		87	4	2	0	—		—		89	4
Luzern	2015–16	Swiss Super League	7	0	3	0	—		—		10	0
Como	2015–16	Serie B	13	1	—		—		—		13	1
Bari	2016–17	Serie B	27	1	—		—		—		27	1
Bari	2017–18	Serie B	32	2	3	0	—		—		35	2
Bari	Total		59	3	3	0	—		—		62	3
Aris	2018–19	Super League Greece	21	0	2	0	—		—		23	0
Career total			362	18	16	2	—		2	0	380	20

=== International ===
As of 9 October 2017

National team	Year	Apps	Goals
Albania	2013	7	1
Albania	2014	1	1
Albania	2015	7	1
Albania	2015	8	0
Albania	2017	6	0
Total		29	3

==== International goals ====
As of 16 November 2015. Albania score listed first, score column indicates score after each Basha's goal.

International goals by date, venue, cap, opponent, score, result and competition
No.	Date	Venue	Cap	Opponent	Score	Result	Competition
1	26 March 2013	Qemal Stafa Stadium, Tirana, Albania	2	Lithuania	3–0	4–1	Friendly
2	5 March 2014	Niko Dovana Stadium, Durrës, Albania	8	Malta	1–0	2–0	Friendly
3	16 November 2015	Qemal Stafa Stadium, Tirana, Albania	15	Georgia	1–2	2–2	Friendly

== Honours ==
=== Club ===
Atalanta

- Serie B: 2010–11

Torino

- Serie B Runner-up: 2011–12
