= Nafesha Richardson =

Saint Vincent and the Grenadines activist (born 1996)

- Born: 1996 (age 29–30); Saint Vincent and the Grenadines
- Education: University of the West Indies; University College London
- Occupations: women rights' advocate, youth activist and climate activist
- Organization(s): Commonwealth Youth Gender and Equality Network (CYGEN)

Nafesha Richardson (born 1996) is a women's rights' advocate, youth activist and climate activist from Saint Vincent and the Grenadines.

== Biography ==
Richardson was born in Saint Vincent and the Grenadines in 1996. When she was aged seven, Richardson joined the St. Vincent and the Grenadines Girl Guides Association, where she began to learn about local social and domestic issues. She studied a Bachelor of Law degree at the University of the West Indies's Cave Hill campus in Barbados then a Master of Law degree at University College London in England.

Richardson campaigned as a Youth Champion of the international Escazú Agreement treaty, which was signed in 2018. She was honoured for this activism at a ceremony held in 2020 at the United Nations Economic Commission for Latin America and the Caribbean (UN ECLAC) offices in Santiago, Chile.

Richardson represented Saint Vincent and the Grenadines at the Youth4Climate: Driving Ambition summit in Milan, Italy, in September 2021. The event was in preparation for the 2021 United Nations Climate Change Conference (COP26) in Glasgow.

As of 2025, Richardson is a One Young World Ambassador and is the Coordinator of the Commonwealth Youth Gender and Equality Network (CYGEN) of the Royal Commonwealth Society.
