= Alessandro Rottoli =

Italian footballer (born 1981)

Personal information
- Date of birth: 27 February 1981 (age 45)
- Place of birth: Bergamo, Italy
- Height: 1.70 m (5 ft 7 in)
- Position: Defender

Youth career
- 1998–1999: Inter Milan

Senior career*
Years	Team	Apps	(Gls)
1999–2000	Cisanese	9	(0)
2000–2003	Alzano Virescit	35	(0)
2003	Levadia Maardu	11	(3)
2004–2005	Voghera	3	(0)
2004–2005	Derthona	11	(0)
2005–2006	Tritium	12	(2)
2006–2007	Olginatese	15	(1)
2007–2008	Lottogiaveno	17	(0)
2008–2015	Mapello		
- * Club domestic league appearances and goals

Alessandro Rottoli (born 27 February 1981) is an Italian former professional footballer.

== Career ==
The defender played during his career in the Primavera team from Inter Milan, Alzano Virescit, Cisanese, Derthona, Merate, Olginatese, Lottogiaveno, Voghera, Tritium and in Estonia for Levadia Maardu.
