= Oleg Delov =

Russian footballer and coach

Personal information
- Full name: Oleg Leonidovich Delov
- Date of birth: 25 May 1963 (age 63)
- Place of birth: Kursk, Russian SFSR
- Height: 1.78 m (5 ft 10 in)
- Position: Midfielder

Youth career
- DYuSSh Kursk

Senior career*
Years	Team	Apps	(Gls)
1980–1981	Avangard Kursk	52	(18)
1982–1992	Iskra Smolensk	334	(94)
1992–1993	Torpedo Mogilev	18	(3)
1993–1995	Krylia Sovetov Samara	60	(5)
1995–1997	Avangard Kursk	54	(26)
1998	Salyut-YuKOS Belgorod	15	(11)
1998–1999	Dynamo Bryansk	36	(15)
1999	Avangard Kursk	16	(9)

Managerial career
- 2003: Avangard Kursk (assistant)
- 2003–2005: Avangard Kursk
- 2007–2008: Dynamo Bryansk
- 2008: Zodiak Stary Oskol
- * Club domestic league appearances and goals as of 1 January 2009

Oleg Leonidovich Delov (Russian: Олег Леонидович Делов; born 25 May 1963) is a former Russian professional football coach and a former player. He made his professional debut in the Soviet Second League in 1981 for FC Avangard Kursk.
