= Gentian Bunjaku =

Swiss footballer

Personal information
- Date of birth: 26 February 1993 (age 33)
- Place of birth: Vushtrri, Kosovo
- Position: Forward

Senior career*
Years	Team	Apps	(Gls)
2012–2013	FC Azzurri LS 90		
2013	Echichens		
2014–2015	Dardania Lausanne		
2016–2017	Stade Nyonnais	11	(2)
2018–2019	Vevey United	50	(37)
2020–2021	Yverdon-Sport	20	(9)
2021–2022	Stade Nyonnais	34	(27)
2022	Vevey-Sports	10	(7)
2023–2024	Dardania Lausanne	13	(10)
- * Club domestic league appearances and goals

Gentian Bunjaku (born 26 February 1993) is a Swiss footballer who last played as a forward for Dardania Lausanne.

== Early life ==
Bunjaku was born in Kosovo and was raised in Biel/Bienne, Switzerland.

== Club career ==
In 2014, Bunjaku signed for Swiss side FC Dardania Lausanne, helping the club achieve promotion.

In 2021, he signed for Swiss side Stade Nyonnais, where he was regarded as one of the club's most important players. He was the top scorer of the 2021–22 league with 22 goals.

== International career ==
Bunjaku played for the Vaud football team at the UEFA Regions Cup.

== Style of play ==
Bunjaku mainly operates as a centre-forward.

== Post-playing career ==
Bunjaku has worked in special education.

== Personal life ==
Bunjaku grew up supporting English Premier League side Liverpool and idolized England international Steven Gerrard.
