= FC Dardania Lausanne =

- Founded: 1995; 31 years ago
- Ground: Centre sportif de Chavannes
- Capacity: 2,000
- Owner: Behar Abdullahu
- Manager: Claudemir Ayres
- League: 2. Liga Interregional
- 2024–25: Group 1, 12th of 16
Home colours

FC Dardania Lausanne is a Swiss football club based in Lausanne. They are an Albanian-backed club. They play in the 2. Liga Interregional.

== History ==
Dardania Lausanne was founded in 1995 by the Albanian community in Switzerland. It was named after the ancient region of Dardania.

== Players ==
=== Notable players ===
This is a list of Dardania Lausanne players with senior national team appearances:

1. (Albania) Migjen Basha
2. (Albania) Lorik Cana
3. (Algeria) Karim Kaddour
4. (Republic of the Congo) Philtzgérald Mbaka

== Historical list of coaches ==
- (Republic of Kosova) Agim Cana (1997–2000)
- (Kosovo) (Switzerland) Gentian Bunjaku (2022–2023)
- (France) Cédric Faivre (2024)
