= Daði =

Daði [ˈtaːðɪ] is an Icelandic masculine given name that may refer to the following notable people:

- Daði Freyr (born 1992), Icelandic musician, also known as "Daði"
- Daði Guðmundsson (c. 1495 – 1563), Icelandic farmer and magistrate
- Daði Lár Jónsson (born 1996), Icelandic sprinter and basketball player
- Daði Lárusson (born 1973), Icelandic football goalkeeper
- Janus Daði Smárason (born 1995), Icelandic handball player
- Jón Daði Böðvarsson (born 1992), Icelandic football player

== See also ==
- Dadi (disambiguation)
