= Norma San Leonardo CF =

Norma San Leonardo
- Full name: Norma San Leonardo Club de Fútbol
- Founded: 1967 (as CD Norma); 1991 (refounded)
- Ground: El Pontón; San Leonardo de Yagüe, Castile and León, Spain
- Capacity: 2,000
- President: (Spain) Gregorio Encabo
- Head coach: (Spain) Sergio Muñoz
- League: Primera Provincial – Soria
- 2025–26: Primera Provincial – Soria, 12th of 15
Home colours	Away colours

Norma San Leonardo Club de Fútbol is a football team based in San Leonardo de Yagüe in the autonomous community of Castile and León. Founded in 1967 and refounded in 1991, it plays in the Primera Provincial – Soria. Its stadium is Estadio El Pontón with a capacity of 2,000 seats.

== Season to season ==
Season	Tier	Division	Place	Copa del Rey
1968–69	6	2ª Reg.	2nd	
1969–70	6	2ª Reg.	1st	
1970–71	6	2ª Reg.	1st	
1971–72	5	1ª Reg.	14th	
1972–73	5	1ª Reg.	4th	
1973–74	5	1ª Reg.	12th	
1974–75	5	1ª Reg.	10th	
1975–76	5	1ª Reg.	4th	
1976–77	4	Reg. Pref.	15th	
1977–78	5	Reg. Pref.	16th	
1978–79	6	1ª Reg.	17th	
1979–80	6	1ª Reg.	4th	
1980–81	6	1ª Reg.	4th	
1981–82	6	1ª Reg.	5th	
1982–83	6	1ª Reg.	9th	
1983–84	6	1ª Reg.	2nd	
1984–85	7	2ª Reg.	4th	
1985–86	7	2ª Reg.	3rd	
1986–1991	DNP			
1991–92	6	1ª Reg.	2nd	

Season	Tier	Division	Place	Copa del Rey
1992–93	6	1ª Reg.	2nd	
1993–94	5	Reg. Pref.	11th	
1994–95	5	Reg. Pref.	7th	
1995–96	5	Reg. Pref.	5th	
1996–97	5	Reg. Pref.	6th	
1997–98	5	Reg. Pref.	2nd	
1998–99	4	3ª	8th	
1999–2000	4	3ª	5th	
2000–01	4	3ª	7th	
2001–02	4	3ª	9th	
2002–03	4	3ª	9th	
2003–04	4	3ª	2nd	
2004–05	4	3ª	8th	
2005–06	4	3ª	6th	
2006–07	4	3ª	7th	
2007–08	4	3ª	7th	
2008–09	4	3ª	19th	
2009–10	5	1ª Reg.	9th	
2010–11	5	1ª Reg.	15th	
2011–12	6	1ª Prov.	2nd	

Season	Tier	Division	Place	Copa del Rey
2012–13	6	1ª Prov.	6th	
2013–14	6	1ª Prov.	14th	
2014–15	6	1ª Prov.	10th	
2015–16	6	1ª Prov.	2nd	
2016–17	5	1ª Reg.	11th	
2017–18	5	1ª Reg.	17th	
2018–19	6	1ª Prov.	5th	
2019–20	6	1ª Prov.	6th	
2020–21	DNP			
2021–22	7	1ª Prov.	13th	
2022–23	7	1ª Prov.	14th	
2023–24	7	1ª Prov.	8th	
2024–25	7	1ª Prov.	10th	
2025–26	7	1ª Prov.	12th	
2026–27	7	1ª Prov.		

- 11 seasons in Tercera División

== Notable former players ==
- (Spain) Ubay Luzardo
- (Spain) Pacheta
