= FC Avangard Kursk =

Russian football club

Avangard
- Full name: Football Club; Avangard Kursk
- Founded: 1946; 80 years ago
- Ground: Trudovye Rezervy Stadium, Kursk
- Capacity: 11,329
- Owner: RubEx Group/Kursk/Kursk Oblast
- Chairman: Dmitry Izvekov
- Manager: Denis Kondakov
- League: Russian Second League, Division B, Group 3
- 2026: 9th
- Website: fc-avangard.ru
Home colours	Away colours

FC Avangard Kursk is an association football club based in Kursk, Russia, currently playing in the fourth tier of Russian football. The team's colors are: home all blue, and away all white.

== History ==
The club has been known under the following names:

- Spartak, 1946–1957
- Trudovye Rezervy, 1958–1965 and 1967–1972
- Trud, 1966
- Avangard, 1973–

Spartak made an appearance in the Soviet league in 1946. Since 1957 Kursk was continuously represented in the league by Trudovye Rezervy, Trud, and Avangard. The club played in Class B and in the Second League. The best achievement was the second position in the zone in 1962 and 1964.

Avangard entered the Russian Second League in 1992 and was moved to the Third League in 1994, after the number of clubs in the Second League was significantly reduced. In 1995, they won promotion to the Second League, and in 2004 Avangard finished second in their Second Division zone, obtaining promotion to the First Division. Avangard played 3 seasons in First Division and relegated to Second Division in 2007 as 18th. Avangard returned to second level in 2009 as Center Group champion. But, Avangard finished in the last place and was relegated to third level in 2010. The club won its PFL zone and was promoted back to the second-tier Russian Football National League at the end of the 2016–17 season.

In the 2017–18 season, the team has reached the final of the Russian Cup, defeating two Premier League clubs (CSKA and Amkar) during the competition. They lost the final 1–2 to FC Tosno on a late goal by Reziuan Mirzov.

In February 2019, Avangard competed in the FNL Cup. They got into finals, where they had to play against FC Rotor Volgograd. The match took place on 20 February. After the full-time, the score was 1:1, with Mikhail Zemskov scoring the opening goal for Avangard on 80' minute and a quick response by Anzor Sanaya on 86' minute of the match. The match has ultimately ended in a penalty shoot-out, where Avangard was able to grab a 3–4 victory.

On 17 May 2020, the club announced that they will be voluntarily relegated to the third-tier PFL for the 2020–21 season due to lack of necessary financing.

== League history ==
=== Russia ===
Season	Div.	Pos.	Pl.	W	D	L	GS	GA	P	Cup	Europe	Top scorer (league)	Head coach
1992	3rd, zone 2	10	42	22	3	17	67	67	47	-	-	(Russia) Tolmachov – 21	(Russia) Galkin
1993	3rd, zone 2	6	30	15	1	14	44	59	31	R512	-	(Russia) Sukhorukov – 14	(Russia) Galkin
1994	4th, zone 2	4	32	19	4	9	51	39	42	R128	-	(Russia) Sukhorukov – 12	(Russia) Galkin
1995	4th, zone 2	1	30	21	2	7	52	30	65	R256	-	(Russia) Gershun – 10	(Russia) Galkin
1996	3rd, "West"	15	38	13	4	21	50	78	43	R128	-	(Russia) Delov – 10	(Russia) Galkin
1997	3rd, "West"	15	38	11	7	20	40	58	40	R512	-	(Russia) Delov – 16	(Russia) Galkin
1998	3rd, "Center"	18	40	9	9	22	34	54	36	R256	-	(Russia) Buda – 10	(Russia) Galkin
1999	3rd, "Center"	15	36	10	7	19	40	59	37	R256	-	(Russia) Delov – 9	(Russia) Galkin
2000	3rd, "Center"	8	38	16	6	16	36	41	54	R128	-	(Russia) Gershun – 9	(Russia) Galkin
2001	3rd, "Center"	8	38	17	7	14	47	41	58	R512	-	(Russia) Gershun – 12	(Russia) Galkin
2002	3rd, "Center"	15	38	11	8	19	40	55	41	R512	-	(Russia) E. Kalashnikov – 10	(Russia) Galkin
2003	3rd, "Center"	13	36	10	7	19	28	37	37	R512	-	(Russia) E. Kalashnikov – 5	(Russia) Galkin (Russia) Delov
2004	3rd, "Center"	2	32	21	5	6	60	23	68	R512	-	(Russia) Larin – 12	(Russia) Delov
2005	2nd	16	42	11	15	16	36	45	48	R256	-	(Russia) Sigachev – 6	(Russia) Delov
2006	2nd	10	42	16	13	13	45	38	61	R64	-	(Russia) Martynov – 7	(Russia) Borzykin
2007	2nd	18	42	15	6	21	50	55	51	R64	-	(Russia) Bukievsky – 11 (Russia) Korovushkin – 11	(Russia) Gorlukovich
2008	3rd, "Center"	2	34	23	6	5	48	18	75	R32	-	(Russia) S. Mikhailov – 10	(Russia) Esipov
2009	3rd, "Center"	1	32	24	1	7	68	23	73	R64	-	(Russia) Borozdin – 11	(Russia) Esipov
2010	2nd	20	38	7	6	25	31	67	27	R32	-	(Russia) Korovushkin – 7	(Russia) Esipov (Russia) Sergeyev (Russia) Ignatenko
2011–12	3rd, "Center"	2	39	21	7	11	62	36	79	R128	-	(Russia) Sargsyan – 17	(Russia) Ignatenko (Russia) Frantsev
2012–13	3rd, "Center"	9	30	11	8	11	42	40	41	R64	-	(Russia) Akhba – 8	(Russia) Frantsev (Russia) Zazulin

== Current squad ==
As of 11 September 2026, according to the Second League website.

Note: Flags indicate national team as defined under FIFA eligibility rules; some limited exceptions apply. Players may hold more than one non-FIFA nationality.

No.	Pos.	Nation	Player
1	GK	RUS	Nikita Artyomov
6	DF	RUS	Andrey Chudov
7	MF	RUS	Dmitry Zakharov
8	MF	RUS	Ivan Kobelev
9	FW	RUS	Aleksandr Khrebtov
11	MF	RUS	Yegor Gershun
16	GK	RUS	Vladislav Teryoshkin
17	DF	RUS	Daniil Kamenev
18	MF	RUS	Yegor Balitsky
19	DF	RUS	Kirill Brisev
22	DF	RUS	Denis Traygel

No.	Pos.	Nation	Player
23	DF	RUS	Ilya Mamkin
25	MF	RUS	Artyom Nekrasov
26	FW	RUS	Savely Borisov
31	MF	RUS	Danila Knyazev
36	DF	RUS	Yegor Yunusov
45	DF	RUS	Daniil Sedov
57	MF	RUS	Denis Konshin
62	MF	RUS	Rustam Berzegov
67	DF	RUS	Viktor Kozyrev
95	FW	RUS	Ruslan Aderikhin

== Notable players ==
Had international caps for their respective countries. Players whose name is listed in bold represented their countries while playing for Avangard.

Russia/USSR

- (Russia) Albert Borzenkov
- (Russia) Valeri Chizhov
- (Russia) Artyom Rebrov
- (Russia) Valery Yesipov

Former USSR countries

- (Armenia) Nair Tiknizyan
- (Belarus) **Andrey Paryvayew**
- (Kazakhstan) Vitaliy Abramov
- (Moldova) Gheorghe Boghiu
- (Moldova) Vladimir Cosse
- (Moldova) Oleg Șișchin
- (Ukraine) Andriy Annenkov

Asia

- (Jordan) Anzour Nafash
