= Aleksandr Galkin (footballer) =

Russian footballer and coach (1948–2018)

Personal information
- Full name: Aleksandr Ivanovich Galkin
- Date of birth: 4 September 1948
- Place of birth: Kursk, Russia, Soviet Union
- Date of death: 4 November 2018 (aged 70)
- Place of death: Kursk, Russia
- Position: Defender

Team information
- Current team: FC Avangard Kursk (VP security)

Senior career*
Years	Team	Apps	(Gls)
1971	FC Trudovyye Rezervy Kursk		
1972	FC SKA Chita		
1972–1975	FC Avangard Kursk		

Managerial career
- 1984: FC Avangard Kursk
- 1985–2003: FC Avangard Kursk
- 1999–2002: FC Avangard Kursk (president)
- 2004: FC Avangard Kursk (technical director)
- 2006–: FC Avangard Kursk (VP security)
- * Club domestic league appearances and goals

Aleksandr Ivanovich Galkin (Russian: Александр Иванович Галкин; 4 September 1948 – 4 November 2018) was a Russian professional football player and coach.
