= Dadi (given name) =

Dadi (Hindi दादी, meaning paternal grandmother) is a given name, which is common in India.

- Dadi Denis (born 1976), Haitian sprinter
- Dadi El Hocine Mouaki (born 1996), Algerian football player
- Dadi Gaye (born 1995), Gambian-Norwegian football player
- Dadi Janki (1916–2020), Indian spiritual leader
- Dadi Jawari, a 17th-century female ruler of Gilgi
- Dadi Leela (1916–2017), Pakistani educationist and music teacher
- Dadi Mayuma (born 1981), football player from the Democratic Republic of the Congo
- Dadi Nicolas (born 1992), a Haitian professional American football player
- Dadi Pudumjee, Indian puppeteer
- Dadi Toka Jr, Papua New Guinea politician
- Dadi Yami (born 1982), Ethiopian long-distance runner
