= Denis Gershun =

Russian footballer and coach

Personal information
- Full name: Denis Igorevich Gershun
- Date of birth: 1 April 1976 (age 50)
- Place of birth: Kursk, Russian SFSR
- Height: 1.83 m (6 ft 0 in)
- Positions: Forward; midfielder

Senior career*
Years	Team	Apps	(Gls)
1992–1997	FC Avangard Kursk	147	(32)
1998	FC Dynamo-2 Moscow	29	(5)
1999	FC Tyumen	21	(1)
2000–2001	FC Avangard Kursk	73	(21)
2002–2003	FC Salyut-Energia Belgorod	56	(17)
2004–2009	FC Avangard Kursk	133	(19)

Managerial career
- 2013–2014: FC Avangard-M Kursk
- 2014–2021: FC Avangard Kursk (assistant)
- 2021–2023: FC Avangard Kursk
- * Club domestic league appearances and goals

Denis Igorevich Gershun (Russian: Денис Игоревич Гершун; born 1 April 1976) is a Russian professional football coach and a former player.

== Club career ==
He made his Russian Football National League debut for FC Tyumen on 4 April 1999 in a game against FC Lokomotiv Saint Petersburg.
