= Philtzgérald Mbaka =

Association football player (born 1993)

Personal information
- Full name: Philtzgérald Grégory Kévin Mbaka
- Date of birth: 24 January 1993 (age 33)
- Place of birth: Villepinte, France
- Height: 1.76 m (5 ft 9 in)
- Position: Midfielder

Team information
- Current team: Dardania Lausanne

Youth career
- Paris Saint-Germain

Senior career*
Years	Team	Apps	(Gls)
2010–2013	Paris Saint-Germain B	57	(2)
2013–2014	Racing Santander B		
2014–2016	Getafe B	39	(0)
2016	South Melbourne	3	(0)
2016–2018	Oman Club		
2018–2019	Farul Constanța	10	(0)
2019	Dardania Lausanne		
2019–2020	Yverdon-Sport II		
2020	FC Forward Morges		
2020–	Dardania Lausanne		

International career
2015	Congo	1	(0)
- * Club domestic league appearances and goals

Philtzgérald Grégory Kévin Mbaka (born 24 January 1993), known as Philtzgérald Mbaka, is a professional footballer who plays as a midfielder for Swiss club FC Dardania Lausanne. Born in France, is a former Republic of the Congo international.

== Club career ==
=== Australia ===
Mbaka signed a one-year contract with South Melbourne at the beginning of 2016. He first featured in a 4–1 win against Oakleigh Cannons that April. before departing by June.

=== Oman ===
Mbaka joined Oman Club in November 2016, taking the number 31 and becoming teammates with a Brazilian, a Chilean, and a Central Asian. Supplying assists instead of scoring, he helped Al-Ahmar qualify for the semi-finals of the 2016–17 Sultan Qaboos Cup, beating Suwaiq Club 1–0 before being knocked out in the second leg. causing them to not reach the final.

== International career ==
Mbaka played two matches for the Congo national team, including a 1–1 draw with Kenya in Africa Cup of Nations qualifying and a friendly against Ghana.

== Honours ==
Paris Saint-Germain U19

- Championnat National U19: 2010–11
