= Benjamín Ruiz =

Chilean footballer (born 1983)

Personal information
- Full name: Benjamín Ignacio Ruiz Herrera
- Date of birth: 21 August 1981 (age 45)
- Place of birth: Santiago de Chile, Chile
- Height: 1.86 m (6 ft 1 in)
- Position: Right back

Youth career
- 1995–2000: Universidad Católica

Senior career*
Years	Team	Apps	(Gls)
2001–2005	Audax Italiano	90	(2)
2006	Colo-Colo	2	(0)
2006	Deportes La Serena	11	(0)
2007	Palestino	8	(0)
2007	O'Higgins	11	(0)
2008–2009	Everton	27	(0)
2010–2015	Ñublense	45	(0)
2015–2016	Unión La Calera	0	(0)
- * Club domestic league appearances and goals as of 18 August 2012

Benjamín Ignacio Ruiz Herrera (Spanish pronunciation: [beŋxaˈmin ˈrwis], born 21 August 1983) was a Chilean footballer who played as right back.

His last club was then Primera B side Unión La Calera.

== Club career ==
He began his career at powerhouse club Universidad Católica, joining then in 2001 to Audax Italiano, remaining there for five seasons, until the coach Claudio Borghi called him to play at Colo-Colo, most successful club of the country, where he won the Torneo de Apertura, his first professional title.

Two seasons later, Benjamín earned with Everton, another honour in his career, under the orders of veteran head coach Nelson Acosta.

== Honours ==
=== Club ===
Colo-Colo

- Primera División de Chile (1): 2006 Apertura

Everton

- Primera División de Chile (1): 2008 Apertura
