= Soeris Baidjoe =

Dutch footballer

Personal information
- Date of birth: 24 October 1981 (age 45)
- Place of birth: Netherlands
- Position: Striker

Youth career
- SV Lelystad ’67
- 2001-2004: FC Groningen

Senior career*
Years	Team	Apps	(Gls)
2004–2005	TOP Oss	16	(0)
2005–2006	Patro Eisden		
2006	Waasland		
2007–2008	Patro Eisden		
2008–2010	Excelsior Veldwezelt		
2010–2012	Patro Eisden	28	(8)
2012–2013	Racing Mechelen	10	(0)
2013–2014	Tienen		
2014–2015	Spouwen-Mopertingen		
2016–2017	FC Anadol		
2018–2021	Heidebloem Dilsen		
- * Club domestic league appearances and goals as of 12 August 2016

Soeris Baidjoe (born 24 October 1981) is a Dutch retired footballer who played as a striker.

== Club career ==
Baidjoe joined Eerste Divisie club TOP Oss from FC Groningen during the 2004–05 season.

He moved abroad to play for Belgian sides Patro Eisden, RS Waasland, Excelsior Veldwezelt and Racing Mechelen and joined Tienen in summer 2013. He moved to Spouwen-Mopertingen in 2015, before joining FC Anadol the following year. He moved to La Squadra Maasmechelen Futsal in 2017.
