= Maksim Arap =

Russian footballer

Personal information
- Full name: Maksim Georgiyevich Arap
- Date of birth: 19 March 1981 (age 45)
- Height: 1.74 m (5 ft 8 1/2 in)
- Position: Midfielder

Youth career
- FC Zenit Saint Petersburg

Senior career*
Years	Team	Apps	(Gls)
1999–2001	FC Zenit Saint Petersburg	2	(0)
1999–2000	→ FC Zenit-d Saint Petersburg	43	(11)
2001	→ FC Lokomotiv-Zenit-2 Saint Petersburg	34	(6)
2002	FC Metallurg Lipetsk	20	(2)
2003–2004	FC Petrotrest St. Petersburg	62	(7)
2005	FC Spartak Lukhovitsy	30	(3)
2006	FC Sheksna Cherepovets	33	(1)
2007–2008	FC Dynamo Saint Petersburg	43	(2)
2011–2012	FC Metallurg-TFZ Tikhvin		
- * Club domestic league appearances and goals

Maksim Georgiyevich Arap (Russian: Максим Георгиевич Арап; born 19 March 1981) is a former Russian football player.
