= Ivan Semenets =

Russian footballer

Personal information
- Full name: Ivan Viktorovich Semenets
- Date of birth: 1 October 1981 (age 45)
- Height: 1.78 m (5 ft 10 in)
- Position: Defender

Youth career
- FC Fakel Voronezh

Senior career*
| Years | Team | Apps | (Gls) |
| 1999–2000 | FC Fakel-2 Voronezh | | |
| 2001 | FC Fakel Voronezh | 1 | (0) |
| 2002 | FC Lokomotiv Liski | 15 | (0) |
| 2003 | FC Lokomotiv Liski (amateur) | | |
| 2004–2005 | FC Dynamo Voronezh (amateur) | | |
| 2006–2007 | FC Dynamo Voronezh | 41 | (3) |
| 2008 | FC FCS-73 Voronezh | 21 | (0) |
| 2009 | FC Fakel Voronezh | 14 | (1) |
| 2010 | FC Dynamo Voronezh (amateur) | | |
- * Club domestic league appearances and goals

Ivan Viktorovich Semenets (Russian: Иван Викторович Семенец; born 1 October 1981) is a former Russian professional footballer.

== Club career ==
He made his debut in the Russian Premier League in 2001 for FC Fakel Voronezh.
