= Aymen Mnafeg =

Tunisian footballer

Personal information
- Full name: Aymen Jouini Mnafeg
- Date of birth: 15 March 1981 (age 45)
- Place of birth: Zarzis, Tunisia
- Position: Midfielder

Senior career*
Years	Team	Apps	(Gls)
2005–2006	ES Zarzis		
2006–2008	Espérance de Tunis		
2008	US Monastir		
2009	AS Kasserine		
2009–2011	EGS Gafsa		
2010	AS Gabès (loan)		
2011–2013	ES Zarzis		
2013–2014	CS Hilalien		
2014	AS Kasserine		
2014–2018	CO Médenine		
- * Club domestic league appearances and goals

Aymen Mnafeg (born 15 March 1981) is a Tunisian football midfielder.
