= Durahim Jamaluddin =

Malaysian footballer (1981–2018)

Durahim Jamaludin
Personal information
- Full name: Durahim Jamaludin
- Date of birth: 13 February 1981
- Place of birth: Merlimau, Malacca, Malaysia
- Date of death: 2 January 2018 (aged 36)
- Place of death: Merlimau, Malacca, Malaysia
- Position: Defender

Senior career*
Years	Team	Apps	(Gls)
1998–2003	Malacca FA		
2004–2005	Perlis FA		
2005–2006	Malacca FA		
2006–2007	Penang FA		
2007–2008	Terengganu FA		
2008–2009	PDRM FA		
2009–2010	Proton FC		
2013	Perlis FA		

International career^{‡}
2005	Malaysia	1	(0)
- * Club domestic league appearances and goals as of 12 January 2009 ‡ National team caps and goals as of 23 January 2009

Durahim Jamaluddin (born 13 February 1981 – 2 January 2018) was a Malaysian footballer who last played for Perlis FA. He was a member of the Malaysia national football team.

He previously played for Perlis FA and won the 2005 Malaysia Super League. With the Malaysia national team, he made his only appearance against Singapore in 2005 international matches. On 2 January 2018, almost 5 years after his retirement from football, Durahim died while on his way to Malacca Hospital, due to a heart attack.
