= Thomas Schlieter =

German footballer (born 1981)

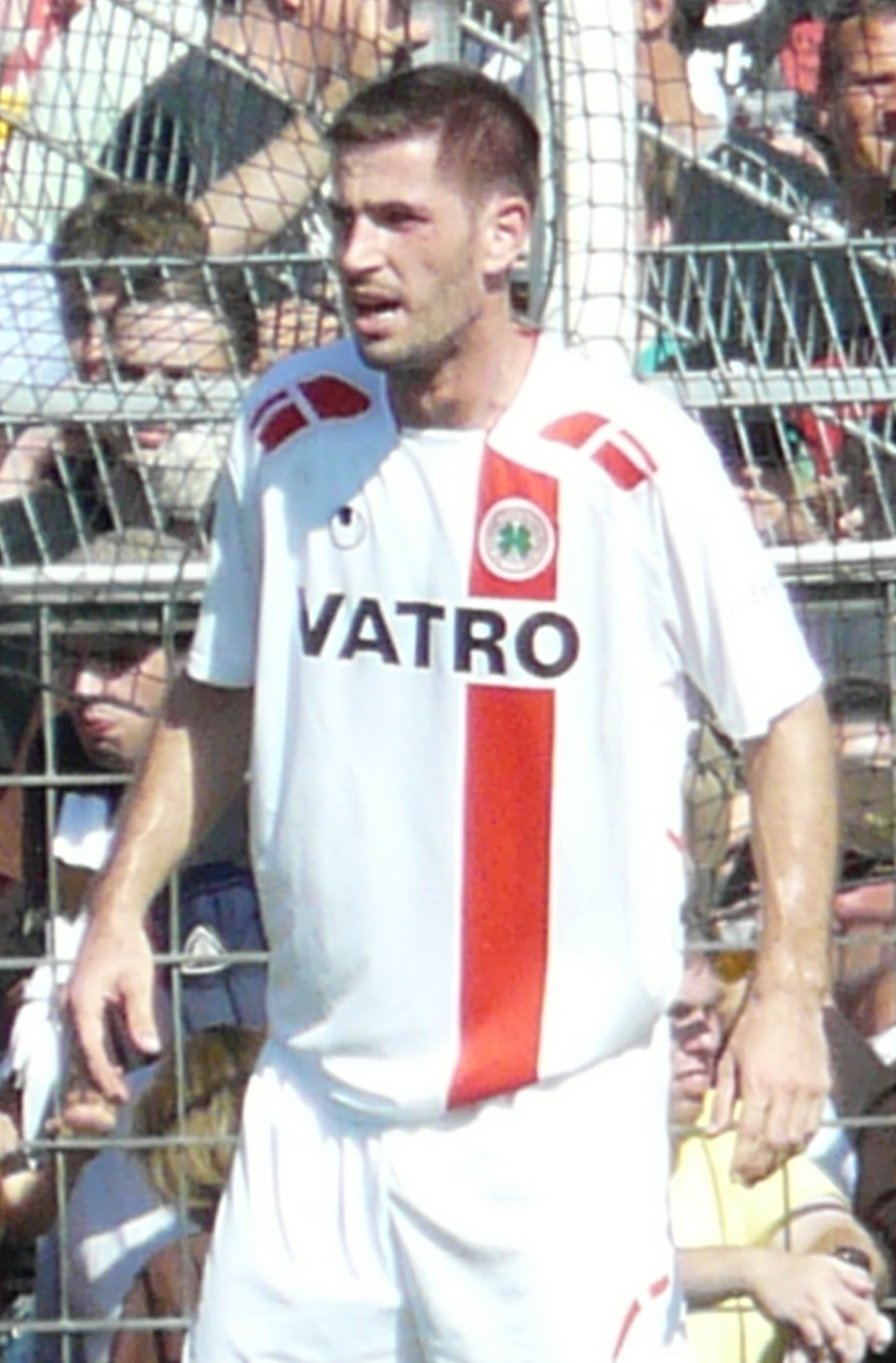

Personal information
- Date of birth: 28 January 1981 (age 45)
- Place of birth: Duisburg, West Germany
- Height: 1.91 m (6 ft 3 in)
- Position: Defender

Team information
- Current team: VfB Homberg

Youth career
- MSV Duisburg
- –2001: Duisburger FV 08

Senior career*
Years	Team	Apps	(Gls)
2001–2003	SF Hamborn 07		
2003–2005	SV Adler Osterfeld		
2005–2006	SSVg Velbert	25	(4)
2007–2011	Rot-Weiß Oberhausen	120	(9)
2011–2013	Wuppertaler SV Borussia	51	(3)
2013–	VfB Homberg		
- * Club domestic league appearances and goals as of 30 June 2012

Thomas Schlieter (born 28 January 1981 in Duisburg, Germany) is a German footballer playing for BV Osterfeld.

== Career ==
He made his debut on the professional league level in the 2. Bundesliga for Rot-Weiß Oberhausen on 24 August 2008, when he started a game against FC Ingolstadt 04.

He then played for Wuppertaler SV, VfB Homberg and VfB Homberg II, after which he took a career break, before returning in the field for BV Osterfeld.

As of 2026, he has appeared in 20 matches across one competition(2010- 2011) with 15 starts and five substitute appearances.
