= Dadi, Iran =

Dadi ددي
- Village
- Location within Iran
- Coordinates: 26°20′43″N 57°12′06″E
- Country: Iran
- Province: Hormozgan
- County: Minab
- Bakhsh: Byaban
- Rural District: Byaban

Population (2006)
  - Total: 76
- Time zone: UTC+3:30 (IRST)
  - Summer (DST): UTC+4:30 (IRDT)

Dadi signpost

Dadi (Persian: ددي, also Romanized as Dadī) is a village in Byaban Rural District, Byaban District, Minab County, Hormozgan Province, Iran. At the 2006 census, its population was 76, in 17 families.
