= Doddy Édouard =

Mauritian footballer

Personal information
- Full name: Doddy Édouard
- Date of birth: 17 June 1981 (age 45)
- Place of birth: Mauritius
- Position: Striker

Team information
- Current team: Faucon Flacq SC

Senior career*
Years	Team	Apps	(Gls)
2002–2006	Faucon Flacq SC	?	(?)
2006–2009	AS Marsouins	?	(?)
2010	AS Rivière du Rempart	?	(?)
2011–	Faucon Flacq SC	?	(?)

International career
2004–2007	Mauritius	1	(0)
- * Club domestic league appearances and goals

Doddy Édouard (born 17 June 1981) is a Mauritian footballer who currently plays as a striker for Faucon Flacq SC. He won one cap for the Mauritius national football team in 2004. Édouard previously played in Réunion for AS Marsouins.
