= Cédric Faivre =

French footballer (born 1981)

Personal information
- Date of birth: April 8, 1981 (age 45)
- Place of birth: Montbéliard, France
- Height: 1.80 m (5 ft 11 in)
- Position: Midfielder

Team information
- Current team: SR Colmar

Senior career*
Years	Team	Apps	(Gls)
2000–2001	Sochaux	1	(0)
2001–2002	Besançon RC		
2002–2003	Gazélec Ajaccio		
2003	Stade Beaucairois		
2004	ASM Belfort		
2004–2006	Troyes AC	16	(1)
2006–2007	Troyes AC (B team)		
2007–2008	ASM Belfort		
2008–2010	SR Colmar	49	(6)
2008–2010	ASM Belfort	25	(1)

International career
2000	France U19	1	(0)

Managerial career
- 2013–2016: Montreux-Sports
- 2023: Monthey
- 2024: Dardania Lausanne
- * Club domestic league appearances and goals as of 16:51, 23 November 2009 (UTC)

Cédric Faivre (born April 8, 1981) is a French professional football player. Currently, he plays in the Championnat de France amateur for SR Colmar.

He played on the professional level in Ligue 1 for Troyes AC and Ligue 2 for FC Sochaux-Montbéliard and Troyes AC.
