= Koen Brack =

Dutch footballer

Personal information
- Full name: Koen Paul Brack
- Date of birth: 13 October 1981 (age 45)
- Place of birth: Deventer, Netherlands
- Position: Defender

Senior career*
| Years | Team | Apps | (Gls) |
| -2004 | Go Ahead Eagles | 92 | (7) |
| 2004-2006 | Cambuur | 82 | (15) |
| 2006-2007 | FC Kärnten | 19 | (0) |
| 20007-2009 | Cambuur | 52 | (7) |
| 2009-2011 | Atessa Val di Sangro | | |
| 2011-2012 | Fortis Trani | | |
| 2012-2013 | Sulmona | | |
| 2014 | Maccarese | | |
| 2014-2015 | San Cesareo | | |
| 2015-2017 | Arzachena | | |
| 2020-2021 | Sulmona | | |
- * Club domestic league appearances and goals

Koen Brack (born 13 October 1981 in the Netherlands) is a Dutch retired footballer.

== Career ==
After playing in the Dutch Eerste Divisie for hometown club Go Ahead Eagles and Cambuur, Brack had a short spell in Austria and then played for several clubs in the lower Italian leagues.
