= Escazú Agreement =

International treaty signed in 2018

Regional Agreement on Access to Information, Public Participation and Justice in Environmental Matters in Latin America and the Caribbean
- Ratified Signatories Non-signatories
- Drafted: 5 May 2015 – 4 March 2018
- Signed: 27 September 2018
- Location: Escazú, Costa Rica
- Effective: 22 April 2021
- Signatories: 24
- Parties: 19
- Depositary: Secretary-General of the United Nations
- Languages: English, French, Portuguese, Quechua, Spanish

The Regional Agreement on Access to Information, Public Participation and Justice in Environmental Matters in Latin America and the Caribbean, better known as the Escazú Agreement (Spanish: Acuerdo de Escazú), is an international treaty signed by 24 Latin American and Caribbean nations concerning the rights of access to information about the environment, public participation in environmental decision-making, environmental justice, and a healthy and sustainable environment for current and future generations. The agreement is open to 33 countries in Latin America and the Caribbean. It has been ratified or acceded by 19 countries: Antigua and Barbuda, Argentina, Belize, Bolivia, Chile, Colombia, Dominica, Ecuador, Grenada, Guyana, Mexico, Nicaragua, Panama, Saint Vincent and the Grenadines, Saint Kitts and Nevis, Saint Lucia, The Bahamas, Trinidad and Tobago and Uruguay.

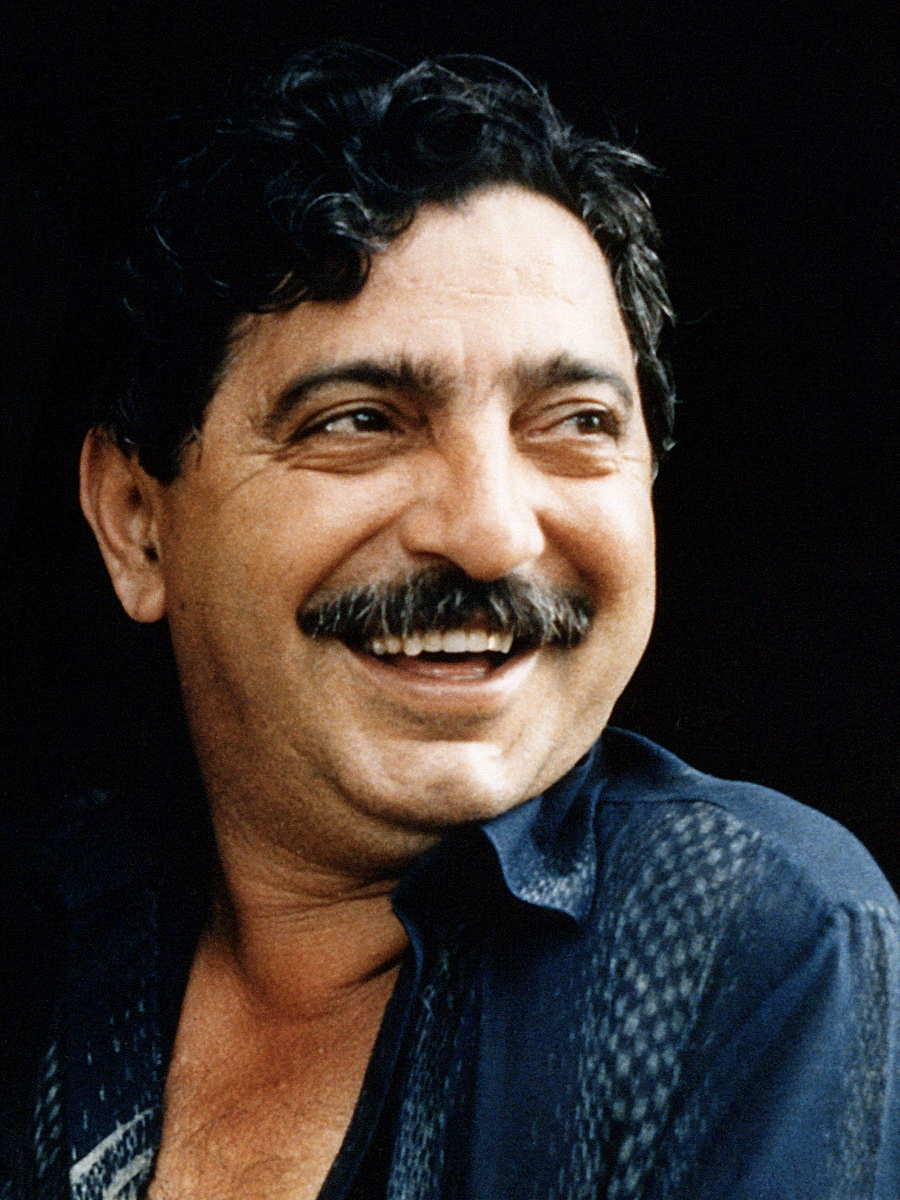
Chico Mendes at his home in Xapuri, Acre, Brazil, in 1988, before his murder because of his environmental activism

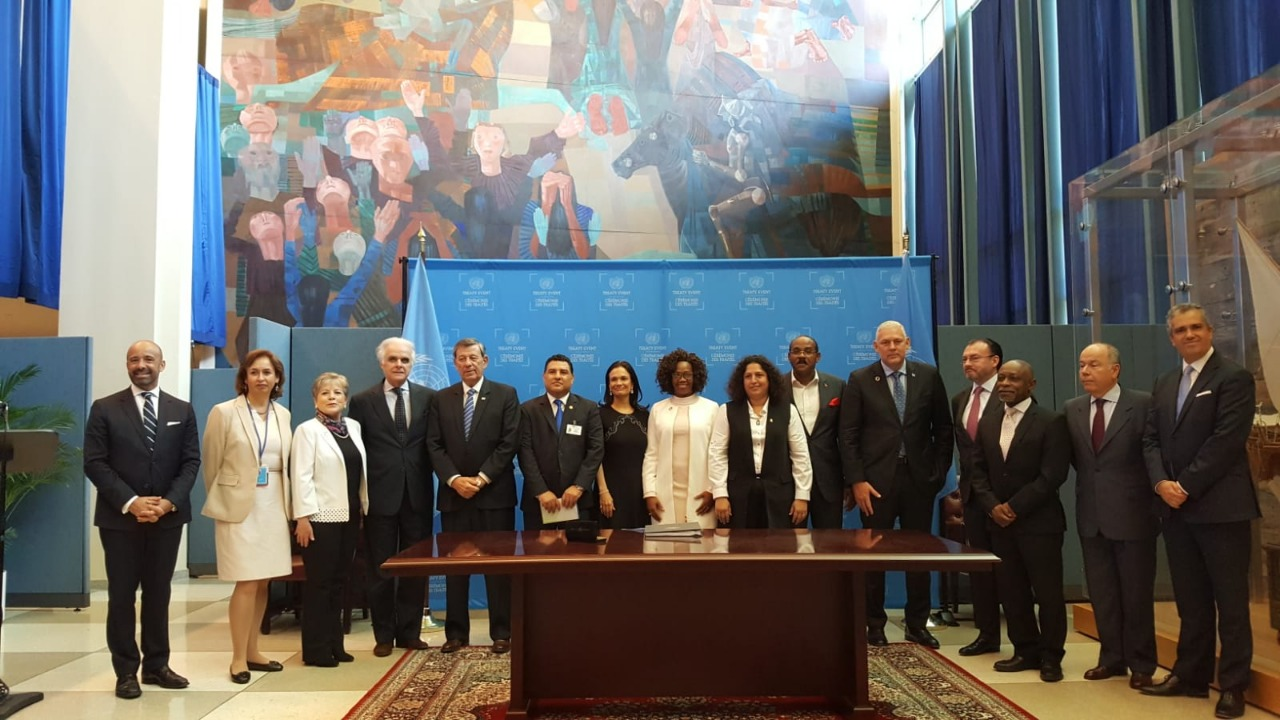
In the framework of the United Nations General Assembly, the Escazú Agreement was opened for signature on 27 September 2018.

The agreement originated at the 2012 United Nations Conference on Sustainable Development and is the only binding treaty to be adopted as a result of the conference. With the UN's Economic Commission for Latin America and the Caribbean (ECLAC) acting as the technical secretariat for the process, it was drafted between 2015 and 2018 and adopted in Escazú, Costa Rica, on 4 March 2018. The agreement was signed on 27 September 2018 and remained open for signature until 26 September 2020. Eleven ratifications were required for the agreement to enter into force, which was achieved on 22 January 2021 with the accession of Mexico and Argentina. The agreement entered into force on 22 April 2021.

The Escazú Agreement is the first international treaty in Latin America and the Caribbean concerning the environment, and the first in the world to include provisions on the rights of environmental defenders. The agreement strengthens the links between human rights and environmental protection by imposing requirements upon member states concerning the rights of environmental defenders. It aims to provide full public access to environmental information, environmental decision-making, and legal protection and recourse concerning environmental matters. It also recognizes the right of current and future generations to a healthy environment and sustainable development.

== Parties and signatories ==
Member	Date of signature	Date of ratification
Antigua and Barbuda	27 September 2018	4 March 2020
Argentina	27 September 2018	22 January 2021
Belize	24 September 2020	7 March 2023
Bolivia	2 November 2018	26 September 2019
Brazil	27 September 2018	
Chile	11 March 2022	13 June 2022
Colombia	11 December 2019	25 September 2024
Costa Rica	27 September 2018	
Dominica	26 September 2020	22 April 2024
Ecuador	27 September 2018	21 May 2020
Grenada	26 September 2019	20 March 2023
Guatemala	27 September 2018	
Guyana	27 September 2018	18 April 2019
Haiti	27 September 2018	
Jamaica	26 September 2019	
Mexico	27 September 2018	22 January 2021
Nicaragua	27 September 2019	9 March 2020
Panama	27 September 2018	10 March 2020
Paraguay	28 September 2018	
Peru	27 September 2018	
Dominican Republic	27 September 2018	
Saint Vincent and the Grenadines	12 July 2019	26 September 2019
Saint Kitts and Nevis	26 September 2019	26 September 2019
Saint Lucia	27 September 2018	1 December 2020
The Bahamas		5 June 2025
Trinidad and Tobago		27 January 2026
Uruguay	27 September 2018	26 September 2019

=== Ratification delays ===
The administration of Brazilian President Luiz Inácio Lula da Silva sent the Escazú Agreement to Congress for approval in 2023. However, the consideration has been moving slowly and the result remains pending up to this date.

Despite being one of the leading countries in the negotiation process for this agreement, Chile decided not to sign the Escazú Agreement in a last minute decision. Few months later, President Sebastián Piñera rejected the entire agreement, apparently due to objections made by the Ministry of Foreign Affairs regarding a potential request from Bolivia to get sovereign access to the Pacific Ocean and the pressure of business leaders. After Piñera left office in March 2022, his successor Gabriel Boric decided to sign the Escazú Agreement, being the first bill presented by his government to the National Congress. Chile ratified the agreement in June 2022.

Costa Rica refused to ratify the agreement after Rodrigo Chaves Robles came to power.

=== Ratification of Colombia ===
The Colombian congress domestically ratified the Agreement in 2022 via Law 2273 of 2022. This law was gazetted via the Diario Oficial in No. 52.209. The law was deemed constitutional by the Constitutional Court of Colombia on 28 August 2024 and Colombia submitted their instrument of ratification to the United Nations on 25 September 2024.

Colombia ranks among the top countries in the region for death of environmental defenders.

== The Pillars of the Escazú Agreement ==
The Escazú Agreement establishes a comprehensive framework built around procedural environmental rights, inspired by the Aarhus Principles, and tailored to regional realities. The pillar principles include:

- Access to environmental information
- Public participation
- Access to justice for citizens affected by resource exploitation

== Youth Champion ==
On 2020, for the agreement's second anniversary, The Access Initiative (TAI), the United Nations Economic Commission for Latin America and the Caribbean (UN ECLAC) and the Government of Costa Rica selected 5 new youth champions, succeeding David R. Boyd, from amongst young activists around Latin America and the Caribbean:

Country	Names
Argentina	Nicole Becker
Chile	Sebastián Benfeld Garcés
Colombia	Laura Serna
Costa Rica	Kyara Cascante
Saint Vincent and the Grenadines	Nafesha Richardson
