= Umar Karsanov =

Russian footballer

Personal information
- Full name: Umar Makharbekovich Karsanov
- Date of birth: 30 December 1981 (age 44)
- Place of birth: Ordzhonikidze, Russian SFSR
- Height: 1.83 m (6 ft 0 in)
- Position: Midfielder

Senior career*
Years	Team	Apps	(Gls)
1998–2001	FC Avtodor Vladikavkaz	80	(8)
2001–2002	FC Alania Vladikavkaz	2	(0)
2003	FC Avtodor Vladikavkaz	12	(0)
2003–2007	FC KAMAZ Naberezhnye Chelny	79	(4)
2007	FC Alania Vladikavkaz	11	(0)
2008	FC Gazovik Orenburg	28	(0)
2009	FC Avtodor Vladikavkaz	16	(1)
2009	FC Gazovik Orenburg	11	(2)
2010–2011	FC Gubkin	41	(0)
- * Club domestic league appearances and goals

Umar Makharbekovich Karsanov (Russian: Умар Махарбекович Карсанов; born 30 December 1981) is a former Russian professional footballer.

He made his debut in the Russian Premier League in 2001 for FC Alania Vladikavkaz.
