= Teferi =

Teferi is a surname. Notable people with the surname include:

- Gibreab Teferi (1915–1980), Ethiopian activist, poet and playwright of Kebur Zabagna
- Marhu Teferi (born 1992), Ethiopian-born Israeli marathon and half marathon runner
- Selamawit Teferi (born 1994), Ethiopian-born Israeli Olympic runner
- Senbere Teferi (born 1995), Ethiopian professional middle- and long-distance runner

== See also ==
- Mizan Teferi, is a town and the administrative center, of the Bench Sheko Zone in the South West Ethiopia Peoples' Region of Ethiopia
- Mizan Teferi Airport, is an airport in Mizan Teferi, Ethiopia
