= Josefine Krengel =

German footballer

Personal information
- Full name: Josefine Krengel
- Date of birth: 31 May 1981 (age 45)
- Place of birth: Germany
- Height: 1.67 m (5 ft 6 in)
- Positions: Defender; midfielder

Senior career*
Years	Team	Apps	(Gls)
1997–2000	Turbine Potsdam		
2000–2003	Bayern Munich		
2003–2008	Tennis Borussia Berlin		
2008–2011	Lokomotive Leipzig		
2012-2014	SV Henstedt-Ulzburg		
- * Club domestic league appearances and goals

Josefine Krengel is a retired German football defender. She previously played for Turbine Potsdam, Bayern Munich, Tennis Borussia Berlin, Lokomotive Leipzig, and SV Henstedt-Ulzburg women.

== Personal life ==
Outside of football, Krengel worked as an insurance salesperson.
