= Shimane Kgope Ntshweu =

Motswana footballer

Personal information
- Full name: Shimane Kgope Ntshweu
- Date of birth: 8 May 1981 (age 45)
- Place of birth: Botswana
- Position: Midfielder

Senior career*
Years	Team	Apps	(Gls)
1998–	Mogoditshane Fighters		

International career
1999–2002	Botswana	9	(2)
- * Club domestic league appearances and goals

Shimane Kgope Ntshweu (born 8 May 1981) is a Motswana footballer who plays as a midfielder for Mogoditshane Fighters. He played for the Botswana national football team between 1999 and 2002.

== International career ==
=== International goals ===
Scores and results list Botswana's goal tally first.

No	Date	Venue	Opponent	Score	Result	Competition
1.	2 March 2002	Botswana National Stadium, Gaborone, Botswana	Swaziland	?–?	6–2	Friendly
2.	2 March 2002	Botswana National Stadium, Gaborone, Botswana	Swaziland	?–?	6–2	Friendly
