= Cristián Basaure =

Chilean footballer (born 1981)

Cristian Basaure
Personal information
- Full name: Cristian Andrés Basaure Urzúa
- Date of birth: 18 March 1981 (age 45)
- Place of birth: Santiago, Chile
- Height: 1.80 m (5 ft 11 in)
- Position: Defender

Youth career
- Universidad Católica

Senior career*
| Years | Team | Apps | (Gls) |
| 1999–2000 | Universidad Católica | 0 | (0) |
| 2001–2002 | Fernández Vial | | |
| 2003–2004 | Magallanes | | |
| 2005 | Deportes Puerto Montt | 33 | (3) |
| 2006–2007 | Palestino | 59 | (2) |
| 2008–2012 | Santiago Morning | 100 | (0) |
| 2010–2011 | → Audax Italiano (loan) | 2 | (0) |
| 2013–2014 | Deportes La Serena | 48 | (2) |
- * Club domestic league appearances and goals

Cristian Andrés Basaure Urzúa (born 18 March 1981) is a Chilean former footballer who played as a defender.

== Career ==
A product of the Universidad Católica youth system, Basaure switched to Fernández Vial in 2001.

He played for Deportes La Serena in 2013.

== After football ==
Basaure has developed a career as a sports commentator for media such as Canal del Fútbol, later TNT Sports Chile, and Radio La Clave.

He graduated as a football manager and owns a football academy in Las Vizcachas town, Puente Alto. In the same place, he has driven a project for kids called Experiencia TV (TV Experience), what links football, media and family.

== Personal life ==
As were Honorino Landa, Félix Landa, Adelmo Yori, Pedro García Barros, and José Luis Sierra, he was an alumnus of Hispan American School.

His grandfather, Hugo Basaure, was a well-known boxer who was born in Huara and made his home in Coquimbo, Chile.
