= Agim Cana =

Albanian footballer (born 1956)

Personal information
- Date of birth: 29 September 1956 (age 70)
- Place of birth: Gjakova, PR Serbia, FPR Yugoslavia (modern day Kosovo)
- Position: Midfielder

Youth career
- Prishtina

Senior career*
Years	Team	Apps	(Gls)
1975–1986	Prishtina	174	(24)
1980–1981	→ Vëllaznimi (loan)	23	(5)
1986	Krems		
1986–1987	Dinamo Zagreb	0	(0)
1987–1988	Gençlerbirliği	31	(0)
1988–1989	Samsunspor	12	(0)
1989–1990	Montreux-Sports		
1990	Espagnol Lausanne		

Managerial career
- 1997–2000: Dardania Lausanne
- * Club domestic league appearances and goals

Agim Cana (born 29 September 1956) is a Kosovan former professional footballer who played as a midfielder. He represented Yugoslavia at youth level.

Born in Gjakova, Kosovo, Cana began his career with FC Prishtina, where he was also on loan for a season at Vëllaznimi, before becoming one of the key players of the club's golden generation that competed in the Yugoslav First League during the 1980s. He was known for his physical strength in duels and his passing ability. In 1986 he moved abroad initially joining Austrian club Krems before shortly afterwards signing for Dinamo Zagreb. He continued his career in Turkey knitially with Gençlerbirliği making his European debut. After a season, he later joined Samsunspor but following a bus accident midway to the season, led to the club's withdrawal, and Cana due to outbreak of the Yugoslav Wars involving his extended family, moved to Switzerland joining second-tier club Montreux-Sports, where was described as an "excellent" and "combative" player. He played two seasons and retired as a professional but continued playing at amateur level with Espagnol Lausanne, concluding his playing career.

He is the father of former Albania captain Lorik Cana.

== Club career ==
Cana was born in Gjakova, Yugoslavia (modern-day Kosovo) on 29 September 1956, into a Kosovar Albanian family.

He joined FC Prishtina in 1975 and became one of the club's most important players during its golden generation, which competed in the Yugoslav First League throughout the 1980s. There, he stood out for his physical strength in duels and his passing ability. Between 1975 and 1986, he made 174 league appearances and scored 24 goals for Prishtina. He spent the 1980–81 season on loan at Vëllaznimi to his hometown Gjakova.

At the age of 30, Cana moved abroad in 1986, initially joining Austrian club Krems before shortly afterwards signing for Dinamo Zagreb.

In 1987 he moved in Turkey to Gençlerbirliği and immediately established himself as a regular starter in midfield, making 31 league appearances and two Turkish Cup appearances during the 1987–88 1.Lig season, while accumulating nearly 2,700 minutes across all competitions. He made his European debut that season, playing in the 1987–88 European Cup Winners' Cup first round against Dinamo Minsk, as Gençlerbirliği were eliminated 3–1 on aggregate.

In next season, Cana remained in Turkey and joined Samsunspor, where he made 12 appearances in the 1988–89 1.Lig, accumulating more than 950 minutes of playing time. In January 1989, Cana narrowly escaped the fatal Samsunspor bus accident as he was suspended for the club's away match against Malatyaspor and remained in Samsun instead of travelling with the team.

Following the accident, which led to the club's withdrawal from the league, Cana sought to return to Prishtina but was persuaded by relatives not to do so because of the escalating Yugoslav Wars and the killing of members of his extended family and instead, through contacts from Prishtina, he joined Swiss second-tier club Montreux-Sports, where head coach Paul Garbani described him as an "excellent" and "combative" player. The club helped the family settle in Cheseaux-sur-Lausanne, where they were granted asylum. He played two seasons before retiring from professional football at the age of 35 and continued playing at amateur level with Espagnol Lausanne.

== Managerial career ==
In 1997, he began coaching the local club Dardania Lausanne, an amateur side founded by the Albanian community. Cana guided the team from the fifth tier of Swiss football to the second division.

In early 2018, Cana became president of Vëllaznimi after taking over the management of the club. He invested in improving the club's infrastructure, including the stadium, training facilities and playing surface, while also increasing financial support for players and coaching staff. He remained in the role for around 20 months before resigning in October 2019, citing family commitments, health concerns and insufficient financial resources.

== Personal life ==
Except his son Lorik, Agim has two daughters, Lea and Laure.

He has Turkish citizenship.
