= Pacheta (footballer, born 1981) =

Spanish footballer

Personal information
- Full name: Hétor Rojo Carrasco
- Date of birth: 9 September 1981 (age 45)
- Place of birth: Salas de los Infantes, Spain
- Height: 1.87 m (6 ft 2 in)
- Position: Striker

Senior career*
Years	Team	Apps	(Gls)
1998–1999	Salas de los Infantes		
1999–2000	Norma San Leonardo		
2000–2001	Calahorra	7	(0)
2001–2002	Numancia B		
2002	Numancia	1	(0)
2002–2003	CD Logroñés	4	(0)
2003	Osasuna B	14	(4)
2003–2004	Mutilvera		
2004–2005	Burgos	25	(1)
2005–2007	Norma San Leonardo		
2007–2008	Fundación Logroñés	16	(16)
2008	Oviedo	6	(4)
2008–2009	Los Barrios	29	(9)
2009–2011	Tudelano	56	(39)
2011–2012	Arandina	31	(7)
2012–2014	Burgos	57	(17)
2014–2016	Peña Deportiva	46	(9)
2016–2020	Sant Rafel	90	(13)
2020–2021	Sant Jordi	13	(2)
- * Club domestic league appearances and goals

Héctor Rojo Carrasco (born 9 September 1981), commonly known as Pacheta, is a Spanish retired footballer who played as a striker.

== Football career ==
Born in Salas de los Infantes, Province of Burgos, Castile and León, Pacheta made his senior debuts with local CP Salas de los Infantes, in the 1998–99 season. He first arrived in the Segunda División B in 2000, signing with CD Calahorra.

A year later, Pacheta signed with CD Numancia, being initially assigned to the reserves in the Tercera División. On 6 February 2002 he first appeared for the main squad, playing the entire second half of a 1–1 home draw against Xerez CD, in the Segunda División. In the following two seasons he remained in the third level, representing CD Logroñés, CA Osasuna B and Burgos CF.

After being released by Burgos, Pacheta spent six seasons in the Tercera División, representing Norma San Leonardo, Fundación Logroñés, Oviedo, Los Barrios and Tudelano. He only returned to the third level in July 2011, signing with Arandina CF. A year later he returned to Burgos, in the fourth level.
