= Witold Sabela =

Polish footballer

Personal information
- Full name: Witold Sabela
- Date of birth: 8 August 1981 (age 45)
- Place of birth: Łódź, Poland
- Height: 1.95 m (6 ft 5 in)
- Position: Goalkeeper

Senior career*
Years	Team	Apps	(Gls)
2000	ŁKS Łódź II		
2001–2007	ŁKS Łódź	1	(0)
2001–2002	→ Górnik Łęczyca (loan)		
2002	→ MKS Mława (loan)		
2003	→ Górnik Łęczyca (loan)		
2003–2004	→ Tur Turek (loan)		
2005	→ Odra Wodzisław (loan)	0	(0)
2008–2009	Tur Turek	15	(0)
2009–2011	Pelikan Łowicz	62	(0)
2011–2013	GKS Katowice	38	(0)
2013–2016	SVA Bad Hersfeld	88	(0)
2016–2017	TSV Lehnerz 1965 II	12	(0)
2017–2018	ESV Weiterode	28	(0)
- * Club domestic league appearances and goals

Witold Sabela (born 8 August 1981) is a Polish former professional footballer who played as a goalkeeper.

== Career ==
=== Club ===
In July 2011, he joined GKS Katowice.
