= Carciano =

Brazilian footballer (born 1981)

Personal information
- Full name: Carciano de Jesus Acácio
- Date of birth: May 13, 1981 (age 45)
- Place of birth: Salvador-BA, Brazil
- Height: 1.78 m (5 ft 10 in)
- Position: Defender

Senior career*
Years	Team	Apps	(Gls)
2007–2008	Villa Nova		
2008	Ceará	6	(0)
2008–2009	Belenenses	19	(0)
2009–2011	Villa Nova		
2011	Boa Esporte	24	(1)
2012	Villa Nova		
2012	Boa Esporte	13	(0)
- * Club domestic league appearances and goals as of 12 March 2012 (UTC)

Carciano de Jesus Acácio, known as just Carciano, is a Brazilian football defender.
