= Nery Fernández =

Paraguayan footballer (born 1981)

Personal information
- Full name: Nery Alejandro Fernández Alcaraz
- Date of birth: 21 February 1981 (age 45)
- Place of birth: Asunción, Paraguay
- Position: Forward

Senior career*
Years	Team	Apps	(Gls)
2005	Cerro Porteño PF	6	(4)
2005	Sportivo Luqueño	16	(5)
2006	Palestino	10	(2)
2006	Provincial Osorno	14	(6)
2007	Aurora	32	(11)
2008	Real Potosí	1	(0)
2008	Sportivo Luqueño	11	(3)
2009	Deportivo Zacapa	13	(3)
2009	Cerro Porteño PF		
2010	Deportes Copiapó	18	(6)
2011	Universitario de Sucre	5	(0)
2011	Real Potosí		
2012	2 de Mayo		
2013	River Plate Asunción		
2013	Fernando de la Mora		

International career
- Paraguay U20
- * Club domestic league appearances and goals

Nery Alejandro Fernández Alcaraz (born 21 February 1981) is a Paraguayan former professional footballer who played as a forward.

== Teams ==
- (Paraguay) Cerro Porteño PF 2005
- (Paraguay) Sportivo Luqueño 2005
- (Chile) Palestino 2006
- (Chile) Provincial Osorno 2006
- (Bolivia) Aurora 2007
- (Bolivia) Real Potosí 2008
- (Paraguay) Sportivo Luqueño 2008
- (Guatemala) Deportivo Zacapa 2009
- (Paraguay) Cerro Porteño PF 2009
- (Chile) Deportes Copiapó 2010
- (Bolivia) Universitario de Sucre 2011
- (Bolivia) Real Potosí 2011
- (Paraguay) 2 de Mayo 2012
- (Paraguay) River Plate Asunción 2013
- (Paraguay) Fernando de la Mora 2013
