= Matt Haddrell =

English footballer

Personal information
- Full name: Matthew Haddrell
- Date of birth: 19 March 1981 (age 45)
- Place of birth: Newcastle-under-Lyme, England
- Position: Forward

Youth career
- 1997–1998: Newcastle Town

Senior career*
Years	Team	Apps	(Gls)
1998–1999	Kidsgrove Athletic		
2000–2002	Vauxhall Motors		
2002–2004	Macclesfield Town	14	(1)
2004–2005	Leek Town		
2006–2007	Newcastle Town		
2007	Redgate Clayton		
2007–2009	Congleton Town	68	(50)
2009–2010	Kidsgrove Athletic		(25)
2010	Congleton Town	20	(13)
2010–2011	Kidsgrove Athletic		(9)
2011–2013	Leek Town		
2013	→ Norton United (loan)		
2013–2014	Kidsgrove Athletic		
2014–2015	Alsager Town		
- * Club domestic league appearances and goals

Matthew Haddrell (born 19 March 1981) is an English footballer who played in the Football League with Macclesfield Town.

== Career ==
Haddrell was born in Newcastle-under-Lyme and began playing football with local side Kidsgrove Athletic before joining Vauxhall Motors. In March 2003 Haddrell joined Macclesfield Town for a fee of £35,000 after impressing against them in a FA Cup match. He played in 14 Football League matches for the Silkmen scoring once against Cheltenham Town. He was released by Macclesfield in May 2004 and then re-entered non-league football with Leek Town. A car crash ended his time at Leek and he made a return to football with Newcastle Town and Staffordshire County Senior League side Redgate Clayton before he moved back up to semi-pro football with Congleton Town. In June 2008 he moved to Spain where he played semi-pro football before moving back to Congleton. He moved back to Kidsgrove for the 2009–10 season where he scored 25 goals before opting for a third spell at Congleton in July 2010. However, he soon moved back to Kidsgrove before moving to Leek Town. Haddrell spent two seasons with Leek and joined Norton United on loan in March 2013. In the summer of 2013 Haddrell joined Kidsgrove Athletic for a fourth time. In July 2014 he joined Alsager Town.
