= Mickaël Germain =

Guadeloupean footballer (born 1981)

Mikaël Germain
Personal information
- Full name: Mickaël Germain
- Date of birth: August 24, 1981 (age 45)
- Place of birth: Saint-Claude, Guadeloupe
- Height: 1.75 m (5 ft 9 in)
- Position: Goalkeeper

Senior career*
Years	Team	Apps	(Gls)
2001–2003	Red Star Pointe-à-Pitre		
2003–2004	Red Star		
2004–2006	US Créteil B		
2006–2007	Racing Paris		
2007–2008	Olympique Noisy-le-Sec		
2008–2009	Villemomble Sports	31	(0)
2009	ASA Issy	0	(0)
2010	UJA Alfortville	30	(0)
2010–2011	Red Star	32	(0)
2011–2012	Paris FC	31	(0)
2013–2015	USR Sainte-Rose		
2015–2016	Red Star Baie Mahault		

International career
2002–2014	Guadeloupe	5	(0)
- * Club domestic league appearances and goals

Mickaël Germain (born 24 August 1981) is a Guadeloupean former professional footballer who played as a goalkeeper. He spent most of his career in France and made five appearances for the Guadeloupe national team.

== Career ==
Germain was born in Saint-Claude, Guadeloupe.

In 2010 he joined Red Star.
