= Denis Shevelev =

Russian footballer

Personal information
- Full name: Denis Aleksandrovich Shevelev
- Date of birth: 18 June 1981 (age 45)
- Height: 1.91 m (6 ft 3 in)
- Position: Defender

Senior career*
Years	Team	Apps	(Gls)
2001	Metallurg-Metiznik Magnitogorsk	7	(0)
2003	Metallurg-Metiznik Magnitogorsk	30	(1)
2004–2005	Zenit Chelyabinsk	60	(3)
2006	Zvezda Irkutsk	10	(0)
2006	Gazovik Orenburg	4	(0)
2007	Dnepr Mogilev	23	(0)
2008–2009	Mashuk-KMV Pyatigorsk	28	(1)
2009	Gornyak Uchaly	11	(0)
2010	Dynamo Stavropol	5	(0)
2010	Volga Tver	13	(0)
2011–2012	Metallurg-Kuzbass Novokuznetsk	32	(3)
2012	Tyumen	1	(0)
2013	Volga Tver	2	(0)
2014	Metallurg Novokuznetsk	7	(0)
- * Club domestic league appearances and goals

Denis Aleksandrovich Shevelev (Russian: Денис Александрович Шевелев; born 18 June 1981) is a former Russian professional footballer.
