= Didi Longuet =

Dutch footballer (born 1981)

Personal information
- Date of birth: 9 March 1981 (age 45)
- Place of birth: Amsterdam, Netherlands
- Height: 1.75 m (5 ft 9 in)
- Position: Right-back

Youth career
- SC Voorland
- 1994–2000: Ajax

Senior career*
Years	Team	Apps	(Gls)
2000–2004	Jong Ajax		
2001–2003	→ Haarlem (loan)	51	(5)
2004–2006	RKC Waalwijk	7	(0)
2006–2011	Dordrecht	116	(0)
2011–2012	Volendam	0	(0)
2012–2014	JOS Watergraafsmeer		

International career
1998–1999	Netherlands U18	5	(1)
1999	Netherlands U19	1	(0)
- * Club domestic league appearances and goals

Didi Longuet (born 9 March 1981) is a Dutch former professional footballer who played as a right-back.

== Football career ==
Longuet started playing youth football with SC Voorland before moving to the youth academy of Ajax in 1994. He made his professional debut in 2001 during a loan at Haarlem. Longuet then played for RKC Waalwijk between 2004 and 2006, where he made his debut in the Eredivisie. Afterwards, he played for Dordrecht for five years, making over 100 appearances for the club. A season at Volendam followed, where he did not make an appearance. Longuet retired as part of amateur club JOS Watergraafsmeer, whom he had joined in July 2012.

A youth international for the Netherlands, Longuet gained one cap for the Netherlands U19 team in 1999.
