= Baptiste Lafleuriel =

French footballer (born 1981)

Personal information
- Date of birth: July 2, 1981 (age 45)
- Place of birth: Moulins, France
- Height: 1.76 m (5 ft 9 1/2 in)
- Position: Midfielder

Senior career*
Years	Team	Apps	(Gls)
1997–2002	Saint-Étienne (B team)		
1998–2001	Saint-Étienne	2	(0)
2002–2003	ASF Andrézieux		
2003–2004	Aurillac FCA		
2004–2006	La Roche VF		
2006–2010	Carquefou		
- * Club domestic league appearances and goals

Baptiste Lafleuriel (born July 2, 1981, in Moulins) is a former French professional footballer.

== Career ==
Lafleuriel played on the professional level in Ligue 1 and Ligue 2 for AS Saint-Étienne.
