= Sam Ketsekile =

Mosotho footballer (born 1981)

Personal information
- Full name: Sam Ketsekile
- Date of birth: 8 May 1981 (age 45)
- Place of birth: Lesotho
- Position: Goalkeeper

Team information
- Current team: Lesotho Prison Service

Senior career*
Years	Team	Apps	(Gls)
2007–2008	Roma Rovers	23	(0)
2008–2009	Mazenod Swallows	29	(0)
2009–	Lesotho Prison Service	36	(0)
2019-	RBV United	0	(0)

International career^{‡}
2007–	Lesotho	28	(0)
- * Club domestic league appearances and goals ‡ National team caps and goals as of 28 July 2023 (UTC)

Sam Ketsekile (born 8 May 1981) is a Mosotho footballer who currently plays as a goalkeeper for Lesotho Prison Service. He has won 15 caps for the Lesotho national football team since 2007.
