= Tomàs Buxó =

Spanish composer

Tomàs Buxó i Pujadas (1882 in Barcelona – 1962) was a Spanish composer. He studied at the Escola Municipal de Música of Barcelona with Lluís Millet. Buxó was one of the generation of young composers whose works were stamped with Catalan nationalism in the 1910s. He is particularly noted for his settings of Jacint Verdaguer.

== Works, editions and recordings ==
- La filadora. Oidà pescadors. on Jacint Verdaguer i el lied català. M. Teresa Garrigosa, soprano; Emili Blasco, piano La mà de Guido, 2005.
