= Gil Ferreira =

Brazilian footballer (born 1981)

Personal information
- Full name: Gilberto Meireles Ferreira
- Date of birth: 6 December 1981 (age 44)
- Place of birth: São Paulo, Brazil
- Height: 1.79 m (5 ft 10 in)
- Position: Defender

Team information
- Current team: Cheng Fung
- Number: 23

Senior career*
Years	Team	Apps	(Gls)
1999–2000	Deportes Melipilla		
2001–2005	Pinhalense		
2005–2007	NK Omiš		
2007–2008	Abrantes		
2008–2009	NK Omiš		
2010–2012	Monte Carlo		
2012	Windsor Arch Ka I	7	(5)
2013	Juventus (São Paulo)		
2016	Windsor Arch Ka I	8	(1)
2017–	Cheng Fung	11	(1)
- * Club domestic league appearances and goals as of 18:25, 1 May 2017 (UTC)

Gilberto "Gil" Meireles Ferreira (born 6 December 1981) is a Brazilian professional footballer who plays as a defender for Cheng Fung of Macau.
