= Paulo (footballer, born 1981) =

Brazilian footballer

Personal information
- Full name: Gideon Paulo da Silva
- Date of birth: July 16, 1981 (age 45)
- Place of birth: Jacobina, Bahia, Brazil
- Height: 1.78 m (5 ft 10 in)
- Position: Midfielder

Senior career*
Years	Team	Apps	(Gls)
2007	Olímpico Pirambu		
2007–2009	FC Schaffhausen	27	(4)
- * Club domestic league appearances and goals as of 7 March 2008

Gideon Paulo da Silva (born 16 July 1981) is a Brazilian footballer who plays as a midfielder.

He was signed by Swiss side FC Schaffhausen on 19 July 2007.
