= Marcin Folc =

Polish footballer (born 1981)

Personal information
- Date of birth: 23 October 1981 (age 45)
- Place of birth: Jawor, Poland
- Height: 1.84 m (6 ft 0 in)
- Position: Striker

Youth career
- Kuźnia Jawor

Senior career*
Years	Team	Apps	(Gls)
2001–2004	RKS Radomsko	96	(22)
2005	Widzew Łódź	6	(1)
2005–2007	Heko Czermno	21	(6)
2007–2008	Zagłębie Sosnowiec	51	(9)
2008–2009	Piast Gliwice	12	(1)
2009–2010	KSZO Ostrowiec	31	(7)
2010–2011	Zagłębie Sosnowiec	11	(1)
2011	Tur Turek	5	(2)
2011–2013	GKS Tychy	43	(11)
2013–2015	Górnik Wałbrzych	41	(10)
2017	Kuźnia Jawor	2	(0)
- * Club domestic league appearances and goals

Marcin Folc (born 23 October 1981) is a Polish former professional footballer who played as a striker.

== Honours ==
Individual

- Polish League Cup top scorer: 2001–02
