= Rodrigo Calaça =

Brazilian footballer (born 1981)

Personal information
- Full name: Rodrigo Pereira Calaça
- Date of birth: January 25, 1981 (age 45)
- Place of birth: Catalão, Brazil
- Height: 1.84 m (6 ft 0 in)
- Position: Goalkeeper

Team information
- Current team: Juazeirense

Youth career
- 1999: CRAC

Senior career*
Years	Team	Apps	(Gls)
2000–2013	Goiás		
2011	→ Sport (loan)		
2012	→ Portuguesa (loan)		
2014–2015	Itumbiara		
2016	Atibaia		
2016–2017	Itumbiara		
2018	Anapolina		
2018	Santa Helena (loan)		
2019–2021	Gama		
2021-	Juazeirense		
- * Club domestic league appearances and goals

Rodrigo Pereira Calaça (born January 25, 1981, in Catalão), is a Brazilian footballer who plays as a goalkeeper for Juazeirense, and previously played at Goiás for over ten years.

== Titles ==
- Goiás State League: 2000, 2002, 2003, 2006, 2009
- Center West Cup: 2000, 2001, 2002
- Campeonato Brasiliense: 2019
