= Neddy Rose =

Seychellois footballer (born 1981)

Neddy Rose (born 31 May 1981) is a Seychellois footballer. He is a central back defender on the Seychelles national football team.

== See also ==
- Football in Seychelles
- List of football clubs in Seychelles
