= Fernando Curcio =

Uruguayan footballer (born 1981)

Personal information
- Full name: Fernando Carlos Curcio Ferreira
- Date of birth: January 26, 1981 (age 45)
- Place of birth: Montevideo, Uruguay
- Height: 1.85 m (6 ft 1 in)
- Position: Forward

Youth career
- Defensor Sporting

Senior career*
Years	Team	Apps	(Gls)
2000	Defensor Sporting	0	(0)
2001	Sud América		
2002–2004	El Tanque Sisley	24	(5)
2005–2006	Basáñez	10	(1)
2006	Saint-Pierroise	–	(–)
2007	Racing Montevideo	11	(7)
2007–2008	Deportivo Mictlán	26	(4)
2008	Juventud Retalteca	–	(–)
2009	Deportivo Malacateco	–	(–)
2009	Rampla Juniors	7	(1)
2010	Monagas	15	(4)
2010–2011	Deportivo Mictlán	21	(7)
2012	Naval	6	(0)
2012	San Lorenzo SJ	–	(–)
2016	Los Discípulos de O'Neill	–	(–)
- * Club domestic league appearances and goals

Fernando Carlos Curcio Ferreira (born January 26, 1981) is a Uruguayan former footballer who played as a forward.

== Teams ==
- (Uruguay) Defensor Sporting 2000
- (Uruguay) Sud América 2001
- (Uruguay) El Tanque Sisley 2002–2004
- (Uruguay) Basáñez 2005–2006
- (Réunion) Saint-Pierroise 2006
- (Uruguay) Racing Club de Montevideo 2007
- (Guatemala) Deportivo Mictlán 2007–2008
- (Guatemala) Juventud Retalteca 2008
- (Guatemala) Deportivo Malacateco 2009
- (Uruguay) Rampla Juniors 2009
- (Venezuela) Monagas 2010
- (Guatemala) Deportivo Mictlán 2010–2011
- (Chile) Naval 2012
- (Uruguay) San Lorenzo de San José 2012
- (Uruguay) Los Discípulos de O'Neill 2016
