= Mana Nopnech =

Thai footballer

Personal information
- Full name: Mana Nopnech
- Date of birth: September 1, 1981 (age 45)
- Place of birth: Bangkok, Thailand
- Height: 1.79 m (5 ft 10 1/2 in)
- Position: Goalkeeper

Team information
- Current team: Chiangmai
- Number: 34

Senior career*
Years	Team	Apps	(Gls)
1997	BBC FC		
2009–2010	Nakhon Pathom		
2011–2012	Chainat		
2013	TOT		
2014–2015	Chiangmai		
- * Club domestic league appearances and goals as of 14 November 2008

Mana Nopnech (Thai: มานะ นพเนตร) is a retired professional footballer from Thailand.
