= Martin van Leeuwen =

Dutch footballer

Personal information
- Full name: Martin van Leeuwen
- Date of birth: 21 November 1981 (age 44)
- Place of birth: Leiden, Netherlands
- Position: Defender

Senior career*
Years	Team	Apps	(Gls)
2002–2004	Sparta Rotterdam	40	(0)
- * Club domestic league appearances and goals as of 5 August 2009 ‡ National team caps and goals as of 9 July 2007

Martin van Leeuwen (born 1981-11-21 in Leiden, Netherlands) is a retired Dutch football (soccer) defender. He made his debut in Dutch professional football on 2002-08-30 for Sparta Rotterdam in a competition match against FC Volendam (2-3).
