= Danny Curran =

English footballer

Personal information
- Full name: Daniel Lee James Curran
- Date of birth: 13 June 1981 (age 45)
- Place of birth: Brentwood, England
- Position: Forward

Youth career
- Leyton Orient

Senior career*
Years	Team	Apps	(Gls)
1998–2000	Leyton Orient	1	(0)
2000	→ Purfleet (loan)		
- Aveley
- East Thurrock United
- Aveley
- Chelmsford City
- Romford
2006–2011	Canvey Island		
- → Great Wakering Rovers (loan)
2011	Tilbury	1	(0)
2011	Great Wakering Rovers		
- * Club domestic league appearances and goals

Daniel Lee James Curran (born 13 June 1981) is an English former footballer who played as a forward.

== Career ==
Curran began his career at Leyton Orient. On 28 December 1998, after progressing to the first team, Curran made his only Football League appearance in a 1–1 draw away to Darlington in the Third Division. In 2000, Curran signed for Purfleet on loan. After departing Leyton Orient, Curran played for Aveley, East Thurrock United, Chelmsford City and Romford, before signing for Canvey Island in 2006. On 27 January 2011, Curran signed for Tilbury. Curran only played one game for Tilbury, on 29 January 2011, in a 2–1 win against Ilford.
