= Jay Murray =

English footballer

Personal information
- Full name: Jade Alan Murray
- Date of birth: 23 September 1981 (age 45)
- Place of birth: Islington, England
- Position: Forward

Youth career
- Leyton Orient

Senior career*
Years	Team	Apps	(Gls)
1999–2002	Leyton Orient	2	(0)
2001	→ Chelmsford City (loan)	3	(0)
2001	→ Sutton United (loan)		
2002–2003	Barking & East Ham United		
2003–2004	St Albans City	20	(2)
- Ford United
- * Club domestic league appearances and goals

Jade Alan Murray (born 23 September 1981) is an English former professional footballer who played as a forward.

== Club career ==
After progressing through the club's academy, Murray made two Football League appearances for Leyton Orient. During his time at the club, Murray had one-month loan spells with Chelmsford City and Sutton United. In February 2002, Murray was released by Leyton Orient, subsequently joining Barking & East Ham United. Murray also had spells with St Albans City and Ford United.

== Personal life ==
In 2006, Murray was convicted of rape whilst working as a postman. In 2010, Murray was convicted for sexual assault. In 2015, Murray was selected to represent England at the Homeless World Cup in Amsterdam, Netherlands.
