= Dmitry Izvekov =

Russian footballer

Personal information
- Full name: Dmitry Ivanovich Izvekov
- Date of birth: 25 January 1981 (age 45)
- Height: 1.76 m (5 ft 9 1/2 in)
- Position: Midfielder

Senior career*
Years	Team	Apps	(Gls)
1999–2006	FC Avangard Kursk	199	(26)
2007	FC Zvezda Irkutsk	18	(0)
2008	FC Krasnodar	22	(3)
2009	FC Gubkin	19	(2)
2010	FC Dynamo Saint Petersburg	6	(0)
2010–2011	FC Sheksna Cherepovets	31	(6)
- * Club domestic league appearances and goals

Dmitry Ivanovich Izvekov (Russian: Дми́трий Ива́нович Изве́ков; born 25 January 1981) is a former Russian professional association football player.

== Club career ==
He played four seasons in the Russian Football National League for FC Avangard Kursk, FC Zvezda Irkutsk and FC Dynamo Saint Petersburg.
