= Dadi (surname) =

Dadi is a surname. Notable people with the surname include:

- Bilkis Dadi (born 1937/38), Indian activist
- Birtukan Ayano Dadi (born 1975), Ethiopian judge and diplomat
- Eugène Dadi (born 1973), Ivorian footballer
- Firdaus Dadi, Indian actress
- Marcel Dadi (1951–1996), Tunisian-born French guitarist
- Zhou Dadi (born 1996), Chinese football player
