= FCD Lottogiaveno =

A.C. Giavenocoazze
- Full name: Associazione Calcistica; Giavenocoazze
- Nickname: Rossoblu (Red-blues)
- Founded: 1987
- Ground: Stadio Comunale, Giaveno, Italy
- Capacity: 400
- Chairman: Luciano Giraudo
- Manager: Rino Grasso
- League: Prima Categoria
- 2022–23: Prima Categoria, 14th
Home colours	Away colours

Associazione Calcistica Giavenocoazze (formerly Football Club Giaveno) is an Italian association football club located in Giaveno, Piedmont. It currently plays in Prima Categoria. Its colors are red and blue.

== History ==
The club was founded in 1968 with the name of U.S. Giaveno. Giaveno spent a long time in the regional Piedmont leagues, and wouldn't gain promotion from the Terza Categoria until the 1980s. When the team finally promoted, they succeeded in a double promotion, gaining promotion to the Prima Categoria.

In 1986 the football club merged with U.S. Coazze, giving the club a new name; A.C. Giaveno Coazze. The small club succeeded to conquer the championship of Prima Categoria at the first attempt, they went on to win the Promozione in order to pass into the hunt for the Eccellenza championship. Giaveno achieved Eccellenza victory the following season.

Giaveno first competed in Serie D during the 1989–90 season, and the successive season finished at sixth place in the championship. The following season the club were not as fortunate and were relegated; they only gained promotion back to Serie D during the 2002–03 season when they also changed denomination to F.C. Giaveno.

In 2007, after a sponsorship deal with Lotto Sport Italia, the club changed denomination to F.C.D. Lottogiaveno.

In 2011, after the end of the sponsorship deal with Lotto Sport Italia, the club changed denomination to A.C. Giavenocoazze.
