= Iván Pailós =

Uruguayan footballer (born 1981)

Personal information
- Full name: Jorge Iván Pailós Gaitán
- Date of birth: October 3, 1981 (age 45)
- Place of birth: Montevideo, Uruguay
- Height: 1.89 m (6 ft 2 in)
- Position: Striker

Senior career*
Years	Team	Apps	(Gls)
2001	Fénix		
2002–2003	El Tanque Sisley		
2003–2005	Sud América		
2006	SD Eibar	6	(0)
2006–2010	Juventud de Las Piedras	28	(5)
2010	Deportivo Malacateco	8	(3)
2011	Plaza Colonia	10	(7)
2011	Club Sportivo Cerrito	9	(2)
2012	Central Córdoba		
2012–2013	C.S. Cartaginés	31	(7)
2013–	Huracán F.C.	23	(7)
- * Club domestic league appearances and goals as of 23 June 2014

Jorge Iván Pailós Gaitán (born 3 October 1981 in Montevideo) is a Uruguayan footballer.

== Club career ==
In January 2006, he was signed by Spanish side SD Eibar to avoid relegation to Segunda División B.

In mid-2010, he was transferred to Deportivo Malacateco where we played in the Liga Nacional de Fútbol de Guatemala.

In January 2012, he signed a new contract with the Argentine club Central Córdoba.

=== Cartaginés ===
In June 2012, he signed a new contract with the Costa Rican club C.S. Cartaginés. Pailós made his official debut for Cartaginés in the opening match in the Winter 2012, scoring his first official goal and the tie against Belén Siglo XXI. In the second game, Pailós scored his second goal with the club and that opened the scoring against San Carlos on the victory of Cartaginés 0–2, after a good left footed shot. His third goal for the club was against Carmelita, after an Eduardo Valverde center and Pailos score on header, for the 1–1. Pailos made his fourth goal, a penalty in the tie 1–1 against Herediano in the Clásico Provincial. In the second goal of Cartagines against Puntarenas, Pailos made a header assistance to Andres Lezcano for 2–1 after a throw in of Esteban Maitland. The fifth goal of Pailos in the club was also a penalty and the 3–1 against Puntarenas and was the 2500th goal in the history of the national championship at the stadium Fello Meza. On 7 November, Pailos Scored his sixth goal from the penalty spot against Herediano.

== Career statistics ==
Season	Club	Division	League		Cup		Concachampions		Total	
Season	Club	Division	Apps	Goals	Apps	Goals	Apps	Goals	Apps	Goals
2012–13	Cartaginés	Primera División	21	7	-	-	-	-	21	7
Career Total			21	7	-	-	-	-	21	7
