= Yohan Viola =

Dominican footballer (born 1981)

Personal information
- Full name: Yohan Kely Viola Sánchez
- Date of birth: 21 October 1981 (age 45)
- Place of birth: San Juan de la Maguana, Dominican Republic
- Height: 1.74 m (5 ft 9 in)
- Position: Striker

Team information
- Current team: FC Cadenazzo
- Number: 21

Youth career
- Rapid Lugano
- AS Breganzona
- until 2001: AC Sementina
- 2001–2002: Lugano

Senior career*
Years	Team	Apps	(Gls)
2002–2003	Lugano	0	(0)
2003–2004	Chiasso	13	(11)
2004–2006	Lugano	63	(19)
2006–2008	FC Winterthur	48	(8)
2008–2009	GC Biaschesi	8	(3)
2009–2010	Lugano U21	18	(7)
2010–2011	SC Düdingen	1	(0)
2011–2012	FC Fribourg	24	(17)
2012–2013	Neuchâtel Xamax	26	(24)
2013–2015	FC Porza		
2015–2017	AC Sementina		
2017–2020	FC Cadenazzo		
2020-2021	FC Malcantone Agno		
2021–2023	FC Lugano Femminile		

International career
2009	Dominican Republic	1	(0)
- * Club domestic league appearances and goals

Yohan Kely Viola Sánchez (born 21 October 1981) is a Dominican footballer who plays as a striker for FC Cadenazzo.

== Career ==
Viola was born in San Juan de la Maguana.

He previously played for Chiasso (2003–2004), Lugano (2004–2006), FC Winterthur (2006–08) in the Swiss Challenge League, GC Biaschesi at Swiss 1. Liga and FC Fribourg.

Viola made an appearance for the Dominican Republic national team in a qualifying match for the 2010 FIFA World Cup.

== Personal life ==
He also holds an Italian passport.
