= Wolfgang Bubenik =

Austrian footballer

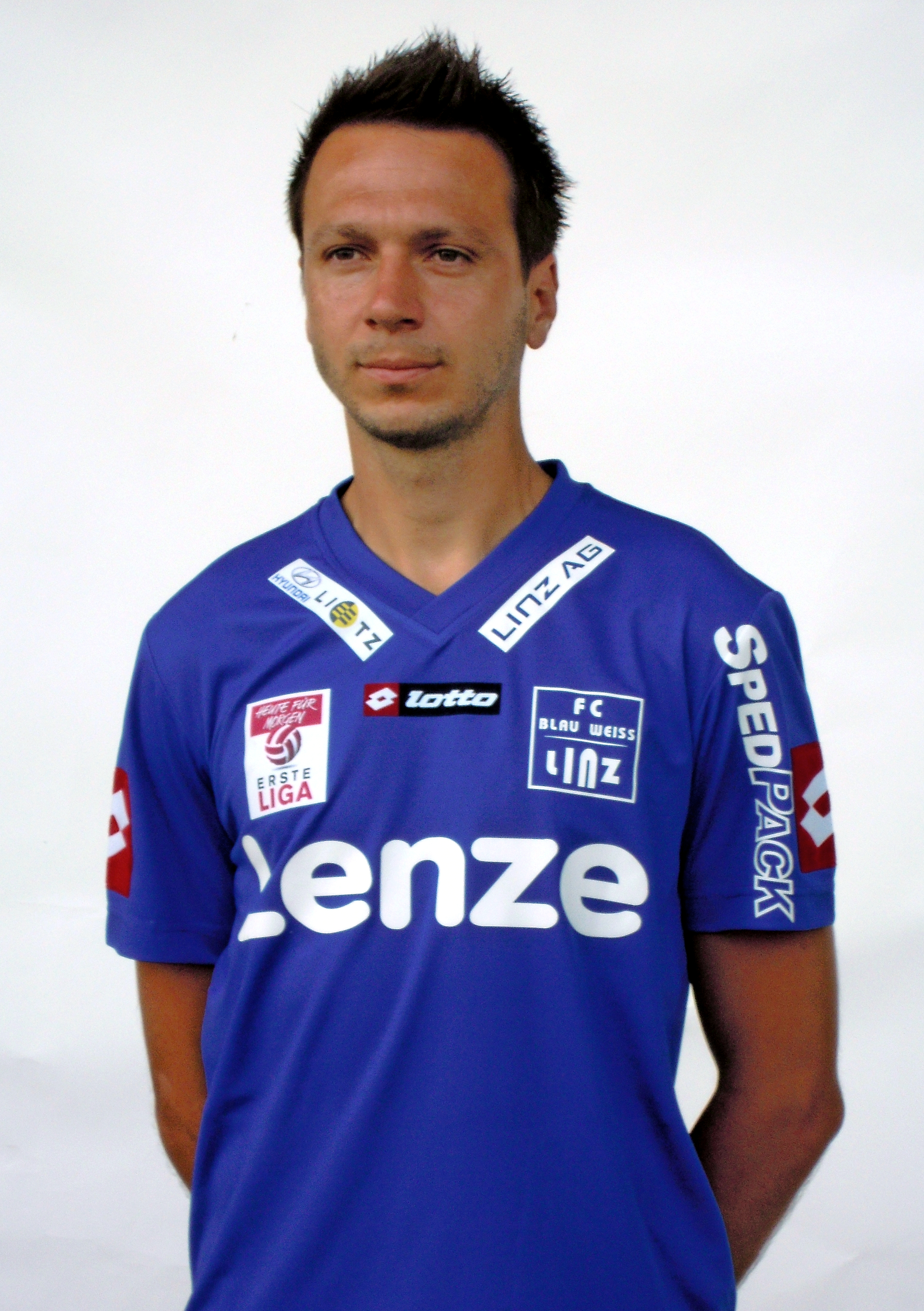
- Wolfgang Bubenik in 2012

Personal information
- Date of birth: 31 March 1981 (age 45)
- Place of birth: Linz, Austria
- Height: 1.85 m (6 ft 1 in)
- Positions: Defender; midfielder

Team information
- Current team: ATSV Rüstorf
- Number: 21

Youth career
- 1989–2000: SK St. Magdalena

Senior career*
Years	Team	Apps	(Gls)
2000–2001	SK St. Magdalena	19	(4)
2001–2003	FC Blau-Weiß Linz	3	(0)
2003–2007	FC Pasching	77	(7)
2007–2009	Austria Kärnten	62	(1)
2009–2011	LASK Linz	61	(0)
2011–2015	FC Blau-Weiß Linz	104	(4)
2015–2016	ASKÖ Oedt	1	(0)
2016–2019	ASKÖ Oedt II		
2019–	ATSV Rüstorf	3	(1)
- * Club domestic league appearances and goals as of 21:09, 25 October 2020 (UTC)

Wolfgang Bubenik (born 31 March 1981) is an Austrian football player who plays for ATSV Rüstorf. He formerly played for FC Blau-Weiss Linz and SV Pasching.
