= Dadi Mayuma =

Democratic Republic of the Congo footballer

Personal information
- Full name: Dadi Sayi-Bok Mayuma
- Date of birth: 31 December 1981 (age 44)
- Place of birth: Kinshasa, Zaire
- Height: 1.65 m (5 ft 5 in)
- Position: Midfielder

Youth career
- –2000: Olympique Noisy-le-Sec

Senior career*
Years	Team	Apps	(Gls)
2000–2001	Olympique Noisy-le-Sec	17	(1)
2001–2004	Toulon	50	(4)
2004–2005	Beauvais		
2005–2006	Toulon	28	(2)
2006–2008	US Boulogne	37	(1)
2008–2009	Paris FC	17	(1)
2009–2013	AFC Compiègne	71	(5)
2013–2014	FCM Aubervilliers	6	(1)
2014	AFC Compiègne	5	(0)

International career
2001–2003	DR Congo U23	6	(0)
- * Club domestic league appearances and goals

Dadi Sayi-Bok Mayuma (born 31 December 1981) is a Congolese former footballer.

Mayuma was fired from Paris FC in February 2009.
