= Federico Tafani =

Italian footballer

Personal information
- Full name: Federico Tafani
- Date of birth: December 12, 1981 (age 44)
- Place of birth: Cagli, Italy
- Height: 1.80 m (5 ft 11 in)
- Position: Defender

Team information
- Current team: Fabriano Cerreto

Senior career*
Years	Team	Apps	(Gls)
2000–2001	Ancona	1	(0)
2001–2002	Taranto	0	(0)
2002	→ Vigor Senigallia (loan)	23	(1)
2002–2003	Maceratese	33	(0)
2003–2004	Vigor Senigallia	33	(0)
2004–2007	Gubbio	90	(1)
2007–2010	San Marino	89	(4)
2010–2011	Casarano	27	(0)
2011–2012	Ancona	32	(1)
2012–2017	Jesina	148	(4)
2017–	Fabriano Cerreto	12	(1)
- * Club domestic league appearances and goals

Federico Tafani (born 12 December 1981) is an Italian footballer. He plays as a defender for Associazione Sportiva Dilettantistica Fabriano Cerreto.
