= Aleksandr Galakhov =

Russian footballer

Personal information
- Full name: Aleksandr Vitalyevich Galakhov
- Date of birth: 3 December 1981 (age 44)
- Height: 1.82 m (6 ft 0 in)
- Position: Defender

Team information
- Current team: FC Zenit Penza

Senior career*
Years	Team	Apps	(Gls)
2000–2002	FC Lada Togliatti	0	(0)
2003–2004	FC Mashuk-KMV Pyatigorsk	34	(0)
2004–2005	FC Mordovia Saransk	25	(1)
2006	FC Sareks-Mordovia Saransk		
2007–2008	FC Zenit Penza	60	(0)
2009	FC Zenit Penza (amateur)		
2010–2012	FC Zenit Penza	61	(2)
2012	FC Shakhtyor Peshelan		
2013–2015	FC Torbeyevo		
- * Club domestic league appearances and goals

Aleksandr Vitalyevich Galakhov (Russian: Александр Витальевич Галахов; born 3 December 1981) is a former Russian professional football player.

== Club career ==
He played in the Russian Football National League for FC Mordovia Saransk in 2004.
