= Maksim Rybalko =

Russian footballer

Personal information
- Full name: Maksim Olegovich Rybalko
- Date of birth: 1 September 1981 (age 45)
- Height: 1.83 m (6 ft 0 in)
- Positions: Defender; midfielder

Youth career
- FC Dynamo Omsk

Senior career*
Years	Team	Apps	(Gls)
2000–2001	FC Dynamo Omsk	22	(1)
2002–2003	FC Irtysh Omsk	1	(0)
2003	FC Metallurg-Metiznik Magnitogorsk	20	(1)
2004–2012	FC Irtysh Omsk	143	(11)
- * Club domestic league appearances and goals

Maksim Olegovich Rybalko (Russian: Максим Олегович Рыбалко; born 1 September 1981) is a former Russian professional football player.

== Club career ==
He played in the Russian Football National League for FC Irtysh Omsk in 2010.
