= David Buxo =

Andorran football player

Personal information
- Date of birth: 16 June 1981 (age 45)
- Place of birth: Andorra
- Position: Midfielder

Team information
- Current team: FC Andorra

Senior career*
Years	Team	Apps	(Gls)
2000–	FC Andorra		

International career
1999–2003	Andorra	3	(0)
- * Club domestic league appearances and goals

David Buxo (born 16 June 1981) is an Andorran football player. He has played for Andorra national team.

== National team statistics ==
Andorra national team
Year	Apps	Goals
1999	1	0
2000	1	0
2001	0	0
2002	0	0
2003	1	0
Total	3	0
