= Jean-Renaud Nemouthé =

French footballer (born 1981)

Jean-Renaud Nemouthé (born 27 June 1981 in Cayenne, French Guiana) is a French retired footballer who played as a midfielder.

== Club career ==
After starting with amateurs FC Les Lilas, Nemouthé signed for Paris FC, where he played for five years. In 2006–07 he moved to Portugal, splitting the season between Vitória de Guimarães (second division) and Moreirense FC (third level).

For the 2007–08 campaign Nemouthé returned to Portugal's second tier, joining S.C. Freamunde. However, after having appeared just twice in the league, he returned to France, signing with Villemomble Sports in January 2008.

In 2009–10 Nemouthé continued in the French lower leagues, after moving to Entente Sportive de Viry-Châtillon. He retired in 2011, aged 30.
