= Bruno Rodriguez (activist) =

Argentine climate activist

Bruno Rodriguez is an Argentine climate activist. He is the leader of the Jóvenes por el Capital Movement in Argentina.

He was a delegate at the 2019 United Nations Youth Climate Summit. He worked with Partido Obrero, and Amnesty International. In 2021, he organized an open letter campaign to candidates, based on the IPCC Sixth Assessment Report.
