= Bruno Parente =

Portuguese footballer

Personal information
- Full name: Bruno Alexandre Parente Rodrigues
- Date of birth: 30 July 1981 (age 45)
- Place of birth: Coimbra, Portugal
- Height: 1.80 m (5 ft 11 in)
- Position: Defender

Senior career*
Years	Team	Apps	(Gls)
2002–2004	Oliveira de Frades		
2004–2005	Social Lamas		
2005–2008	Nelas		
2009–2011	Feirense	8	(0)
2010–2011	→ Tondela (loan)		
2011–2012	Oliveira de Frades	20	(2)
2012–2017	Pampilhosa	133	(0)
- * Club domestic league appearances and goals

Bruno Alexandre Parente Rodrigues, known as Bruno Parente (born 30 July 1981) is a Portuguese former professional footballer who played as a defender.

== Career ==
He made his professional debut in the Segunda Liga for Feirense on 25 January 2009 in a game against Santa Clara.
