= Jerusalem Prayer Breakfast =

Annual international prayer movement

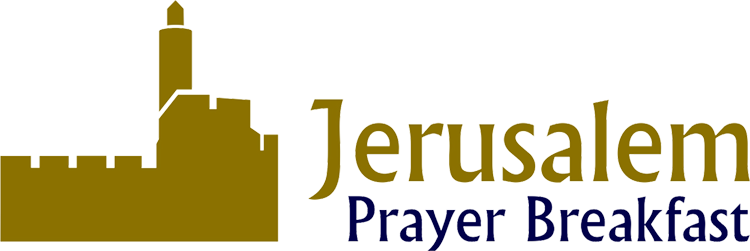
- Formation: 2016
- Founder: Robert Ilatov
- Type: Prayer movement Interfaith organization
- Purpose: Pro-Israel advocacy Fostering Judeo-Christian dialogue
- Headquarters: Jerusalem, Israel
- Location: Global
- Region served: Worldwide
- Services: Annual prayer breakfast events in Jerusalem and international locations
- Members: Government leaders, business leaders, Christian influencers
- Key people: Chair: Robert Ilatov (former MK); Co-chair: Michele Bachmann (former U.S. Congresswoman); Director: Albert Veksler
- Website: jerusalemprayerbreakfast.org

The Jerusalem Prayer Breakfast (JPB) is an annual international prayer movement initiated, and chaired, by former Knesset Member Robert Ilatov, and co-chaired by former U.S. Congresswoman Michele Bachmann. Modeled after the National Prayer Breakfast in the United States, the event brings together government leaders, business figures, and influential Christian leaders from various countries to pray for the Peace of Jerusalem (referencing Psalm 122:6) and support for Israel.

The first event was held in Jerusalem in 2017. As of 2026, marking its 10th anniversary, the JPB has hosted nine annual gatherings in Israel, and 27 satellite events in other countries worldwide.

== History ==
Founders of the Jerusalem Prayer Breakfast

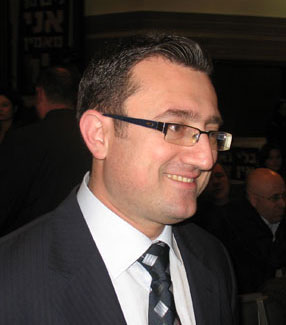
Chair: Robert Ilatov (former MK)

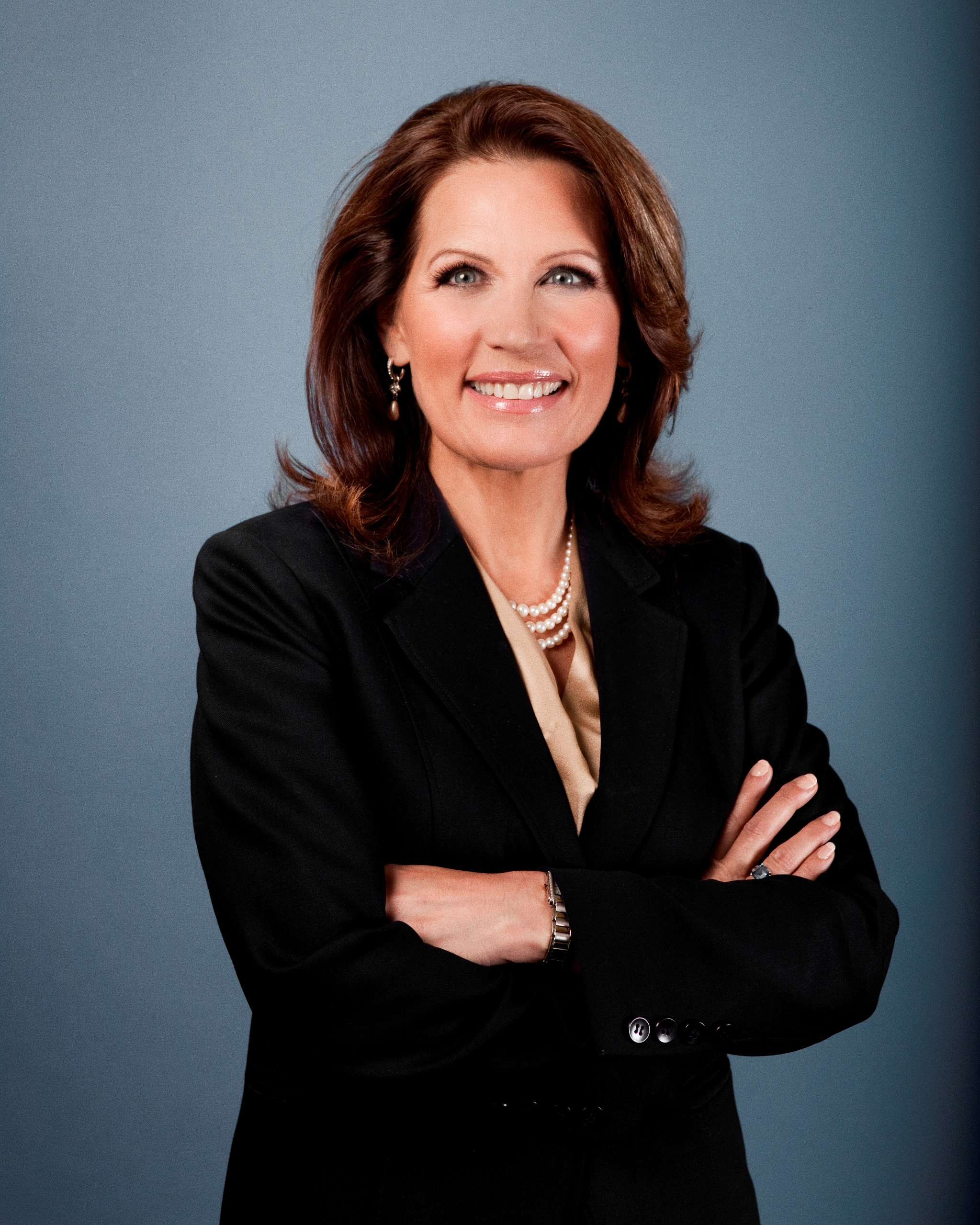
Co-chair: Michele Bachmann (former U.S. Congresswoman)

The Jerusalem Prayer Breakfast was founded in 2016 by Robert Ilatov, who was then chairman of the Knesset Christian Allies Caucus. Ilatov sought to create a framework for engaging Christian supporters of Israel through prayer and policy discussions, drawing inspiration from the U.S. National Prayer Breakfast, which dates back to 1953. Albert Veksler, who had experience in NGO coalition-building, assisted in organizing the initiative and became its global director.

The inaugural event took place in Jerusalem in 2017, coinciding with the 50th anniversary of the reunification of Jerusalem. It attracted over 500 participants from 58 countries, including spiritual leaders and politicians. Israeli President Reuven Rivlin endorsed the gathering, marking its official launch. By 2023, the JPB had expanded to include six annual events in Jerusalem, with plans for a seventh aligned with Israel's 75th anniversary.

In response to global events, such as the October 7, 2023, attacks on Israel, the JPB emphasized themes of protection, healing, and hope, with gatherings extending to pray for Israel's security and the return of hostages. By early 2026, the initiative had held events in 27 countries, including gatherings in Taipei, Taiwan (December 2025) and at Mar-a-Lago in the United States (January 2025 and January 2026).

== Organization and purpose ==
The JPB is described as a “faith-based diplomatic platform” for aligning nations with Israel at high levels, combining prayer with policy engagement. The core purpose is rooted in biblical verses, such as Psalm 122:6, urging participants to pray for the peace of Jerusalem. Events typically include keynote speeches, panel discussions, scripture readings, and communal prayers, often involving both Jewish and Christian participants.

The gathering is invitation-only for many international events, targeting government officials, business leaders, and religious figures. It has been endorsed by Israeli leaders, including Prime Minister Benjamin Netanyahu, who has welcomed participants to represent their nations in Jerusalem.

== Annual events ==
The flagship event occurs annually in Jerusalem, typically in May or June, at venues like the Waldorf Astoria Jerusalem. Programs include Knesset receptions, live concerts, and prophetic teachings. The 2018 event, for example, featured introductions from Knesset members, rabbis, and Christian leaders.

International expansions began shortly after the inaugural gathering. Notable events include:

- 2019 in The Hague, Netherlands, held in the Ridderzaal (Knights' Hall), focusing on interfaith cooperation and support for Israel.
- 2022 in Dallas, Texas, attended by over 800 participants, including U.S. Senator Ted Cruz and Texas Governor Greg Abbott.
- 2024 in New York City, drawing nearly 1,000 attendees from 30 nations amid discussions on antisemitism.
- On 14 January 2025, the Jerusalem Prayer Breakfast and an inaugural luncheon were held at Mar-a-Lago, Florida, ahead of the second inauguration of Donald Trump. According to the organizers, the event brought together approximately 700 participants. Its main themes included support for Israel, prayers for peace in Jerusalem, and prayers for the US president-elect. Participants included US representatives Greg Steube and Don Bacon, Knesset members Ohad Tal and Yulia Malinovsky, former US representative Michele Bachmann, Brazilian senator Flávio Bolsonaro, and actress Marla Maples. The program included joint prayers, addresses by political and religious leaders, and musical performances. Trump did not attend the event in person.
- 2025 in Taipei, Taiwan (December), bringing together faith leaders, cultural figures, and international delegates for prayer, music, and dialogue amid regional geopolitical tensions.
- January 2026 at Mar-a-Lago, Florida (January 12–13), featuring exiled Iranian Crown Prince Reza Pahlavi (via video and letter), delegations from Latvia and Brazil, and emphasis on U.S.-Israel relations and global security.

By early 2026, the JPB had hosted events in over 27 countries and locations, including Brazil, Canada, Estonia, Ukraine, Finland, Norway, the United Kingdom, Ghana, Singapore, South Africa, Italy, Australia, and others.

== Notable participants ==
The Jerusalem Prayer Breakfast has attracted a range of prominent figures from politics, religion, diplomacy, and public life across its events in Jerusalem and internationally.

- Israeli leaders: Founder and chair Robert Ilatov (former Knesset Member), Benjamin Netanyahu (Prime Minister, who has addressed participants), Benny Gantz, Tania Mazarsky (MK), Yulia Malinovsky (MK), Ohad Tal (MK), and Knesset Speaker Amir Ohana (who welcomed delegations).
- U.S. politicians and figures: Co-chair Michele Bachmann (former U.S. Congresswoman), U.S. Senator Ted Cruz, Texas Governor Greg Abbott, Representatives Mike Lawler and Don Bacon, and Marla Maples (who participated in the 2026 Mar-a-Lago event).
- International political figures: Exiled Iranian Crown Prince Reza Pahlavi (addressed the January 2026 Mar-a-Lago event via video statement and letter), Brazilian Congressman Eduardo Bolsonaro and Flávio Bolsonaro, delegations from Latvia (parliamentary delegation in 2026), and representatives from various countries including Argentina, Brazil, the Netherlands, Finland, Estonia, and others.
- Religious and inspirational leaders: Anne Graham Lotz, associates of Billy Graham, pastors such as Mario Bramnick and Steve Berger (who read Reza Pahlavi's letter at Mar-a-Lago), Rabbi Pinchas Taylor, evangelist Nick Vujicic, and other clergy from Jewish and Christian traditions.
