= Christians' Israel Public Action Campaign =

Pro-Israel advocacy group

Christians' Israel Public Action Campaign (CIPAC) is an American, Christian pro-Israel advocacy group.

== History ==
CIPAC was founded after the 1991 Prayer Breakfast for Israel as a Christian movement to support Israel.

== See also ==
- Jerusalem Prayer Breakfast
