= George Marsden (disambiguation) =

George Marsden is an American historian.

George Marsden may also refer to:

- George Marsden (boxer) (1911–1980), English boxer
- George Marsden (cricketer) (1869–1938), English cricketer
- George Marsden (rugby) (1880–1948), English rugby union and rugby league footballer
