= Pinchas Taylor =

American rabbi and author

Personal life
- Education: Rabbinical College of America; Yeshivas Ohr Elchanon Chabad
- Occupation: Rabbi, author

Religious life
- Religion: Judaism
- Denomination: Orthodox Judaism

Jewish leader
- Semikhah: 2008

Pinchas Taylor is an American rabbi and author. He is executive director of the American Faith Coalition. Taylor is the author of the books Pillars of Faith and A Jewish Guide to the Mysterious.

== Life and career ==
Taylor grew up in Plantation, Florida, in a mostly secular Jewish family. At age 15, he began practicing Orthodox Judaism and decided to become a rabbi. He studied at the Rabbinical College of America and Yeshivas Ohr Elchanon Chabad, and was ordained as a rabbi in 2008.

In 2010, Taylor joined Chabad of Plantation, where he taught classes on Jewish thought. He previously taught at the Rabbinical College of America and has lectured at the National Jewish Retreat. He also taught at Chaya Aydel Seminary and worked as a hospice chaplain in Broward and Miami-Dade counties.

In October 2017, Florida governor Rick Scott appointed Taylor to the Florida Faith-Based and Community-Based Advisory Council. In 2018, Taylor founded The Ark, an online Torah study and coaching program.

Taylor later founded the American Faith Coalition, a nonprofit organization that provides Jewish education to Jews and non-Jews, including people from Christian and Messianic Christian backgrounds. He serves as its executive director. In 2023, Taylor visited a former Messianic Christian community in Show Low, Arizona whose members had begun studying Judaism.

== Publications ==
In 2014, Taylor published Pillars of Faith: A Reasonable Approach to the Foundations of Judaism, which examines Jewish theology, science and religion, free will and the afterlife.

In 2020, he published A Jewish Guide to the Mysterious, about Jewish perspectives on dreams, astrology, supernatural beings, reincarnation and the afterlife.

His other books include Pizza with a Rabbi: A Stroll Through Traditional Judaism, co-authored with Robert Shemin, A Beginner's and Skeptic's Guide to God, and One Nation Under God: A Jewish Guide to American Politics & Patriotism.
