= Len Wickwar =

British boxer (1911–1980)

Personal information
- Born: Leonard Arthur Wickwar; 11 March 1911 Leicester, England
- Died: 1 June 1980 (aged 69)
- Weight: Flyweight Bantamweight Lightweight

Boxing career

Boxing record
- Total fights: 473
- Wins: 342
- Win by KO: 94
- Losses: 86
- Draws: 43
- No contests: 2

Len Wickwar (11 March 1911 – 1 June 1980) was a British boxer who fought between 1928 and 1947, mostly as a lightweight. He fought more verified professional fights than any other boxer in history at 473 with 4,020 rounds fought in his 19-year career.

== Career ==
Born in Leicester, Wickwar turned professional in 1928 at the age of 17 and made his debut on 23 October at flyweight, knocking out Jim Young Shepherdson in the fourth round at Leicester's Spinney Hill Club. He had been discovered by manager George Biddles at a gym above the Friar Tuck public house on Woodgate. Biddles also managed the Nottinghamshire featherweight Tish Marsden. Starting his career fighting in small clubs, Wickwar would fight up to three times in one night. In 1934 alone he had 58 fights.

In December 1937, Wickwar beat then British lightweight champion Jimmy Walsh in a non-title fight at Granby Halls. By 1938, Wickwar was an "official contender" for the British lightweight title then held by Dave Crowley. Although he never got a shot at the title, one of his biggest fights was at Welford Road Stadium in July 1939 in front of a crowd of 14,000, in a non-title fight against reigning British champion Eric Boon, who had taken the lightweight title from Crowley eight months earlier; Wickwar was knocked out by Boon in the ninth round.

His boxing career was put on hold during World War II; He returned to boxing after the war but only fought four more times before retiring. In his final fight he was knocked out in the fifth round by Danny Cunningham in a welterweight contest on 6 February 1947.

He fought a total of 470 professional fights, which is the highest amount by any boxer, including 340 victories.

After retiring from boxing, Wickwar lived in the New Parks area of Leicester and worked for local company Bentley Engineering as a packer and labourer.

Wickwar and Marsden died on the same day in 1980.

== Professional boxing record ==
473 fights	342 wins	86 losses
By knockout	94	37
By decision	237	45
By disqualification	11	4
Draws	43	
No contests	2	

No.	Result	Record	Opponent	Type	Round	Date	Location	Notes
473	Loss	342–86–43 (2)	Danny Cunningham	KO	5 (8)	Feb 6, 1947	New St James Hall, Newcastle, Tyne and Wear, England	
472	Win	342–85–43 (2)	Stan Hibbert	PTS	8	Dec 9, 1946	Granby Halls, Leicester, Leicestershire, England	
471	Win	341–85–43 (2)	Ralph Moss	PTS	8	Dec 2, 1946	Granby Halls, Leicester, Leicestershire, England	
470	Win	340–85–43 (2)	Mick Gibbons	RTD	5 (10)	Nov 11, 1946	Cossington Street Baths, Leicester, Leicestershire, England	
469	Win	339–85–43 (2)	Ginger Ward	PTS	10	Jun 10, 1940	Skating Rink, Nuneaton, Warwickshire, England	
468	Win	338–85–43 (2)	Tommy Shaw	KO	3 (10)	Apr 16, 1940	Skating Rink, Bedworth, Warwickshire, England	
467	Win	337–85–43 (2)	Gerry McCready	PTS	10	Aug 28, 1939	Town Hall, Loughborough, Leicestershire, England	
466	Win	336–85–43 (2)	Ted Hinton	PTS	10	Aug 25, 1939	Drill Hall, Coventry, West Midlands, England	
465	Loss	335–85–43 (2)	Benny Caplan	PTS	12	Aug 16, 1939	Butlin's Stadium, Skegness, Lincolnshire, England	
464	Loss	335–84–43 (2)	Eric Boon	KO	9 (12)	Jul 17, 1939	Welford Road Stadium, Leicester, Leicestershire, England	
463	Draw	335–83–43 (2)	Johnny McGrory	PTS	10	Jun 15, 1939	Saracen Park, Glasgow, Scotland	
462	Win	335–83–42 (2)	Johnny Houlston	PTS	12	Jun 5, 1939	Pill Harriers Football Ground, Newport, Wales	
461	Win	334–83–42 (2)	Johnny Cunningham	PTS	8	May 21, 1939	Mile End, London, England	
460	Loss	333–83–42 (2)	Les McCarthy	PTS	10	May 14, 1939	Devonshire Club, Hackney, London, England	
459	Win	333–82–42 (2)	Fred Lowbridge	KO	4 (10)	May 8, 1939	Windmill Club, Rushden, Northamptonshire, England	
458	Loss	332–82–42 (2)	Jimmy Vaughan	PTS	10	Apr 27, 1939	Royal Albert Hall, Kensington, London, England	
457	Win	332–81–42 (2)	Johnny Jenkins	PTS	8	Jan 31, 1939	Granby Halls, Leicester, Leicestershire, England	
456	Win	331–81–42 (2)	Norman Finnegan	KO	1 (8)	Jan 29, 1939	The Ring, Blackfriars Road, Southwark, London, England	
455	Win	330–81–42 (2)	Johnny Kilburn	KO	5 (10)	Jan 27, 1939	Albion Road Stadium, North Shields, Tyne and Wear, England	
454	Win	329–81–42 (2)	Mick Carney	PTS	8	Jan 16, 1939	Earls Court Arena, Kensington, London, England	
453	Draw	328–81–42 (2)	George Daly	PTS	10	Jan 1, 1939	The Ring, Blackfriars Road, Southwark, London, England	
452	Win	328–81–41 (2)	Herbert Booth	PTS	8	Dec 19, 1938	National Sporting Club, Kensington, London, England	
451	Win	327–81–41 (2)	Peter Price	KO	4 (8)	Dec 6, 1938	Granby Halls, Leicester, Leicestershire, England	
450	Loss	326–81–41 (2)	Mick Carney	DQ	3 (10)	Dec 4, 1938	The Ring, Blackfriars Road, Southwark, London, England	
449	Win	326–80–41 (2)	Con Flynn	KO	2 (10)	Nov 28, 1938	Adelphi Gardens Pavilion, Paignton, Devon, England	
448	Win	325–80–41 (2)	George Daly	TKO	5 (10)	Nov 13, 1938	The Ring, Blackfriars Road, Southwark, London, England	
447	Loss	324–80–41 (2)	Al Lyttle	PTS	10	Nov 8, 1938	Granby Halls, Leicester, Leicestershire, England	
446	Win	324–79–41 (2)	Jackie Phillips	TKO	7 (10)	Oct 31, 1938	Windmill Club, Rushden, Northamptonshire, England	
445	Win	323–79–41 (2)	Joe Gollob	TKO	6 (8)	Oct 17, 1938	NSC, Earls Court Empress Stadium, Kensington, London, England	
444	Win	322–79–41 (2)	Tommy John	PTS	10	Oct 3, 1938	Oxford, Oxfordshire, England	
443	Win	321–79–41 (2)	Frankie Devine	TKO	7 (10)	Sep 19, 1938	Market Harborough, Leicestershire, England	
442	Win	320–79–41 (2)	Billy Brooks	PTS	10	Sep 18, 1938	Devonshire Club, Hackney, London, England	
441	Win	319–79–41 (2)	Mick Carney	TKO	10 (12)	Sep 12, 1938	Town Hall, Loughborough, Leicestershire, England	
440	Loss	318–79–41 (2)	Tommy Hyams	DQ	5 (15)	Aug 25, 1938	Skegness, Lincolnshire, England	
439	Win	318–78–41 (2)	Sam Boy Smithson	TKO	9 (10)	Aug 12, 1938	Victoria Crescent FC, Burton-on-Trent, Staffordshire, England	
438	Win	317–78–41 (2)	Vic Morris	KO	7 (10)	Jul 21, 1938	Camborne, Cornwall, England	
437	Win	316–78–41 (2)	Billy Clements	KO	2 (10)	Jul 11, 1938	Market Harborough, Leicestershire, Scotland	
436	Win	315–78–41 (2)	Johnny Finnerty	RTD	11 (12)	Jul 5, 1938	Parkhead Arena, Glasgow, Scotland	
435	Win	314–78–41 (2)	Jerry Costello	TKO	7 (10)	Jun 18, 1938	Kettering, Northamptonshire, England	
434	Win	313–78–41 (2)	Dennis Cahill	KO	6 (12)	Jun 14, 1938	Parkhead Arena, Glasgow, Scotland	
433	Win	312–78–41 (2)	Mick Miller	KO	1 (8)	Jun 7, 1938	Leicester, Leicestershire, England	
432	Win	311–78–41 (2)	Dodo Williams	KO	3 (12)	May 16, 1938	Pill Harriers Football Ground, Newport, Wales	
431	Win	310–78–41 (2)	George Kelly	TKO	4 (10)	May 7, 1938	Theatre Royal, Dublin, Ireland	
430	Win	309–78–41 (2)	Wally Hutchings	KO	9 (10)	Apr 26, 1938	Mannesmann Hall, Swansea, Wales	
429	Win	308–78–41 (2)	Bill Cadby	TKO	8 (12)	Apr 11, 1938	Birmingham, West Midlands, England	
428	Win	307–78–41 (2)	Tom Bull	TKO	6 (10)	Apr 4, 1938	Drill Hall, York, Yorkshire, England	
427	Win	306–78–41 (2)	Walter Rankin	KO	2 (10)	Mar 28, 1938	Long Buckby, Northamptonshire, England	
426	Win	305–78–41 (2)	Kid Oliveira	TKO	9 (10)	Mar 14, 1938	Nottingham, Nottinghamshire, England	
425	Loss	304–78–41 (2)	Freddie Miller	PTS	12	Feb 21, 1938	Granby Halls, Leicester, Leicestershire, England	
424	Win	304–77–41 (2)	Charlie Chetwin	TKO	7 (10)	Jan 27, 1938	Kidderminster, Worcestershire, England	
423	Win	303–77–41 (2)	Boy Fitzgerald	TKO	6 (10)	Jan 19, 1938	Holywell, Wales	
422	Win	302–77–41 (2)	Walter Rankin	TKO	5 (10)	Jan 3, 1938	Nottingham, Nottinghamshire, England	
421	Win	301–77–41 (2)	Jimmy Walsh	PTS	8	Dec 13, 1937	Granby Halls, Leicester, Leicestershire, England	
420	Win	300–77–41 (2)	Ivor Pickens	KO	1 (10)	Dec 7, 1937	Drill Hall, Hereford, Herefordshire, England	
419	Win	299–77–41 (2)	Harry Ainsworth	PTS	10	Nov 29, 1937	King's Hall, Derby, Derbyshire, England	
418	Win	298–77–41 (2)	Jim Anderson	TKO	8 (10)	Nov 28, 1937	Devonshire Club, Hackney, London, England	
417	Win	297–77–41 (2)	Charlie Chetwin	TKO	2 (10)	Nov 23, 1937	Leicester, Leicestershire, England	
416	Win	296–77–41 (2)	Mog Gwilliam	PTS	12	Nov 22, 1937	Pillgwenlly Labour Hall, Newport, Wales	
415	Win	295–77–41 (2)	Peter Price	PTS	10	Nov 15, 1937	Worcester, Worcestershire, England	
414	Win	294–77–41 (2)	Billy Strange	PTS	10	Nov 2, 1937	Drill Hall, Hereford, Herefordshire, England	
413	Win	293–77–41 (2)	Jack McCabe	PTS	10	Nov 1, 1937	Sutton-in-Ashfield, Nottinghamshire, England	
412	Win	292–77–41 (2)	Paddy Roche	TKO	6 (10)	Oct 25, 1937	Rushden, Northamptonshire, England	
411	Win	291–77–41 (2)	Arthur Killeen	KO	6 (15)	Oct 20, 1937	Winter Gardens, Morecambe, Lancashire, England	
410	Win	290–77–41 (2)	Jim Teasdale	PTS	10	Oct 11, 1937	Kettering, Northamptonshire, England	
409	Win	289–77–41 (2)	Paddy Roche	TKO	7 (10)	Oct 8, 1937	Hackney, London, England	
408	Win	288–77–41 (2)	Cyril Johnson	PTS	10	Oct 4, 1937	Doncaster, Yorkshire, England	
407	Win	287–77–41 (2)	Charlie Smith	PTS	12	Sep 13, 1937	Market Hall, Shrewsbury, Shropshire, England	
406	Win	286–77–41 (2)	Jim Teasdale	PTS	10	Sep 8, 1937	Exhibition Building, York, Yorkshire, England	
405	Win	285–77–41 (2)	Jack McKnight	PTS	10	Aug 31, 1937	Leicester, Leicestershire, England	
404	Win	284–77–41 (2)	Bob Barlow	RTD	10 (10)	Aug 9, 1937	Bull's head Field, Belper, Derbyshire, England	
403	Win	283–77–41 (2)	Charles Yates	TKO	2 (10)	Jul 20, 1937	Spinney Hill Club, Leicester, Leicestershire, England	
402	Win	282–77–41 (2)	Billy Strange	PTS	10	Jul 12, 1937	Cattle Market Fairground, Rugby, Warwickshire, England	
401	Loss	281–77–41 (2)	Billy Bird	PTS	12	Jul 3, 1937	Alexandra Park, Ipswich, Suffolk, England	
400	Win	281–76–41 (2)	Joe Smith	KO	3 (10)	Jun 15, 1937	Spinney Hill Club, Leicester, Leicestershire, England	
399	Win	280–76–41 (2)	Willie Piper	PTS	12	Jun 5, 1937	Town Hall, Maesteg, Wales	
398	Win	279–76–41 (2)	Harry Lightfoot	TKO	8 (10)	May 18, 1937	Leicester, Leicestershire, England	
397	Win	278–76–41 (2)	Alf Taylor	PTS	10	Apr 27, 1937	Spinney Hill Club, Leicester, Leicestershire, England	
396	Win	277–76–41 (2)	Harry O'Grady	KO	2 (10)	Apr 26, 1937	Co-op Hall, Rugby, Warwickshire, England	
395	Win	276–76–41 (2)	Freddie Bustard	KO	5 (10)	Apr 21, 1937	Town Hall, Maesteg, Wales	
394	Win	275–76–41 (2)	Vic Morris	PTS	10	Apr 12, 1937	Worcester, Worcestershire, England	
393	Win	274–76–41 (2)	Harry Ainsworth	PTS	10	Apr 7, 1937	Drill Hall, York, Yorkshire, England	
392	Win	273–76–41 (2)	Jack McKnight	PTS	10	Mar 29, 1937	Corn Exchange, Bury Saint Edmunds, Suffolk, England	
391	Win	272–76–41 (2)	Mick Carney	PTS	12	Mar 24, 1937	Drill Hall, Gravesend, Kent, England	
390	Win	271–76–41 (2)	Fred Naylor	TKO	10 (10)	Mar 21, 1937	King's Hall, Derby, Derbyshire, England	Won vacant BBBofC Midlands Area welterweight title
389	Win	270–76–41 (2)	Mick Miller	PTS	10	Mar 8, 1937	King's Hall, Derby, Derbyshire, England	
388	Win	269–76–41 (2)	Dodo Williams	PTS	10	Mar 5, 1937	Devonshire Club, Hackney, London, England	
387	Win	268–76–41 (2)	Willie Piper	PTS	10	Mar 1, 1937	Mannesmann Hall, Swansea, Wales	
386	Win	267–76–41 (2)	Jack Hammer	PTS	10	Feb 22, 1937	Rugby, Warwickshire, England	
385	Draw	266–76–41 (2)	Sonny Lee	PTS	10	Feb 8, 1937	Granby Halls, Leicester, Leicestershire, England	
384	Win	266–76–40 (2)	Eric Dolby	TKO	5 (10)	Jan 25, 1937	King's Hall, Derby, Derbyshire, England	
383	Loss	265–76–40 (2)	George Odwell	KO	3 (10)	Jan 17, 1937	East Ham Baths, East Ham, London, England	
382	Loss	265–75–40 (2)	Frank Barton	PTS	9	Dec 18, 1936	Tower Circus, Blackpool, Lancashire, England	
381	Win	265–74–40 (2)	Jack Langford	PTS	10	Dec 16, 1936	White City Stadium, Hull, Yorkshire, England	
380	Draw	264–74–40 (2)	Willie Piper	PTS	10	Dec 14, 1936	Vetch Field, Swansea, Wales	
379	Draw	264–74–39 (2)	Chuck Parker	PTS	10	Nov 25, 1936	White City Stadium, Hull, Yorkshire, England	
378	Win	264–74–38 (2)	Bill Graham	PTS	12	Nov 17, 1936	Grimsby, Lincolnshire, England	
377	Loss	263–74–38 (2)	Alby Day	KO	3 (10)	Nov 15, 1936	Devonshire Club, Hackney, London, England	
376	Loss	263–73–38 (2)	Jack McCabe	PTS	10	Nov 2, 1936	Clayton-Le-Moors, Lancashire, England	
375	Draw	263–72–38 (2)	Sonny Lee	PTS	10	Oct 26, 1936	Crossington Street Baths, Leicester, Leicestershire, England	
374	Loss	263–72–37 (2)	Billy Smith	RTD	1 (10)	Oct 19, 1936	Kent Street Baths, Birmingham, West Midlands, England	
373	Loss	263–71–37 (2)	Robert Disch	PTS	12	Oct 16, 1936	Millbay Rinkeries, Plymouth, Devon, England	
372	Win	263–70–37 (2)	Frank Travell	KO	4 (10)	Oct 12, 1936	Town Hall, Northampton, Northamptonshire, England	
371	Loss	262–70–37 (2)	Robert Disch	PTS	10	Oct 5, 1936	De Doelen, Rotterdam, Netherlands	
370	Win	262–69–37 (2)	Mick Miller	PTS	8	Sep 29, 1936	Leicester, Leicestershire, England	
369	Win	261–69–37 (2)	Jack Tye	TKO	8 (10)	Sep 17, 1936	Public Hall, Barnsley, Yorkshire, England	
368	Win	260–69–37 (2)	Cuthbert Taylor	PTS	8	Sep 14, 1936	Vetch Field, Swansea, Wales	
367	Win	259–69–37 (2)	Sam Boy Smithson	PTS	8	Sep 8, 1936	Spinney Hill Club, Leicester, Leicestershire, England	
366	Draw	258–69–37 (2)	Elfryn Morris	PTS	8	Aug 17, 1936	Welford Road Stadium, Leicester, Leicestershire, England	
365	Win	258–69–36 (2)	Tommy John	PTS	12	Aug 10, 1936	Mannesmann Hall, Swansea, Wales	
364	Win	257–69–36 (2)	Arthur Hill	PTS	12	Jul 19, 1936	Barnsley Stadium, Barnsley, Yorkshire, England	
363	Win	256–69–36 (2)	Pat Cowley	PTS	8	Jul 9, 1936	Crusaders Football Ground, Belfast, Northern Ireland	
362	Loss	255–69–36 (2)	Tommy John	PTS	10	Jun 28, 1936	The Arena, Mile End, London, England	
361	Draw	255–68–36 (2)	Frank Hill	PTS	12	Jun 21, 1936	Junction Stadium, Manchester, Lancashire, England	
360	Win	255–68–35 (2)	Paddy Roche	TKO	4 (10)	Jun 20, 1936	Keighley, Yorkshire, England	
359	Draw	254–68–35 (2)	George Odwell	PTS	10	Jun 15, 1936	Holborn Stadium, Holborn, London, England	
358	Win	254–68–34 (2)	Chris Benson	TKO	5 (12)	Jun 5, 1936	Newark, Nottinghamshire, England	
357	Win	253–68–34 (2)	Bob Smithson	PTS	10	Jun 1, 1936	Newark, Nottinghamshire, England	
356	Win	252–68–34 (2)	Mick Manning	PTS	8	May 26, 1936	Spinney Hill Club, Leicester, Leicestershire, England	
355	Win	251–68–34 (2)	Jack Lewis	KO	9 (12)	May 24, 1936	The Arena, Mile End, London, England	
354	Win	250–68–34 (2)	Mick Miller	PTS	10	May 21, 1936	Drill Hall, Bethnal Green, London, England	
353	Win	249–68–34 (2)	Ivor Drew	KO	1 (10)	May 18, 1936	Vetch Field, Swansea, Wales	
352	Win	248–68–34 (2)	Frankie Simms	PTS	10	May 9, 1936	Corn Exchange, Spalding, Lincolnshire, England	
351	Draw	247–68–34 (2)	Frank Hill	PTS	12	Apr 28, 1936	Drill Hall, Barrow In Furness, Cumbria, England	
350	Win	247–68–33 (2)	Noah Turley	KO	2 (10)	Apr 20, 1936	Kettering, Northamptonshire, England	
349	Win	246–68–33 (2)	Ted Hinton	PTS	10	Apr 6, 1936	Theatre Royal, Loughborough, Leicestershire, England	
348	Win	245–68–33 (2)	Billy Brooks	PTS	12	Mar 30, 1936	Kettering, Northamptonshire, England	
347	Win	244–68–33 (2)	Don Harrison	PTS	10	Mar 23, 1936	Windmill Club, Rushden, Northamptonshire, England	
346	Win	243–68–33 (2)	George Rose	KO	3 (12)	Mar 18, 1936	Ealing Baths, Ealing, London, England	
345	Win	242–68–33 (2)	Frankie Simms	PTS	8	Mar 17, 1936	Spinney Hill Club, Leicester, Leicestershire, England	
344	Loss	241–68–33 (2)	Peter Price	PTS	10	Mar 16, 1936	Worcester, Worcestershire, England	
343	Win	241–67–33 (2)	Sonny Lee	KO	1 (10)	Mar 9, 1936	Olympia, Bradford, Yorkshire, England	
342	Win	240–67–33 (2)	Joe Broughy	PTS	10	Mar 3, 1936	King's Hall, Derby, Derbyshire, England	
341	Loss	239–67–33 (2)	Peter Price	KO	3 (10)	Feb 10, 1936	Worcester, Worcestershire, England	
340	Win	239–66–33 (2)	Baker Woodend	PTS	12	Feb 7, 1936	Harrogate, Yorkshire, England	
339	Win	238–66–33 (2)	Jack Kid Davies	KO	8 (10)	Feb 4, 1936	Grimsby, Lincolnshire, England	
338	Win	237–66–33 (2)	Arnold Sheppard	PTS	10	Feb 3, 1936	Victoria Baths, Nottingham, Nottinghamshire, England	
337	Win	236–66–33 (2)	Bill Graham	PTS	12	Jan 17, 1936	Corporation Bus Garage, Lincoln, Lincolnshire, England	
336	Loss	235–66–33 (2)	Jack Kid Davies	DQ	6 (12)	Jan 13, 1936	Baths, Sutton-in-Ashfield, Nottinghamshire, England	
335	Win	235–65–33 (2)	Harry Mason	PTS	10	Jan 6, 1936	King's Hall, Derby, Derbyshire, England	
334	Win	234–65–33 (2)	Peter Price	PTS	10	Dec 23, 1935	Worcester, Worcestershire, England	
333	Win	233–65–33 (2)	Arnold Sheppard	PTS	12	Dec 16, 1935	Miners Welfare Hall, Edwinstowe, Nottinghamshire, England	
332	Loss	232–65–33 (2)	Walter Young Lincoln	PTS	12	Dec 2, 1935	Corn Hall, Norwich, Norfolk, England	
331	Win	232–64–33 (2)	Jack Kirby	PTS	10	Nov 29, 1935	Drill Hall, Burton-on-Trent, Staffordshire, England	
330	Win	231–64–33 (2)	Nobby Clarke	PTS	12	Nov 24, 1935	Junction Stadium, Manchester, Lancashire, England	
329	Win	230–64–33 (2)	Jack Kid Davies	PTS	12	Nov 22, 1935	Drill Hall, Lincoln, Lincolnshire, England	
328	Win	229–64–33 (2)	George Leigh	PTS	12	Nov 18, 1935	Public Baths, Darwen, Lancashire, England	
327	Win	228–64–33 (2)	Spud Murphy	PTS	10	Nov 17, 1935	Middlesbrough, Yorkshire, England	
326	Win	227–64–33 (2)	Boyo Pat Cassidy	RTD	7 (12)	Nov 4, 1935	Plumstead, London, England	
325	Win	226–64–33 (2)	Nipper Eddie Cooper	KO	1 (10)	Oct 27, 1935	Middlesbrough Sporting Club, Middlesbrough, Yorkshire, England	
324	Win	225–64–33 (2)	Eddie Kid Jones	TKO	9 (12)	Oct 25, 1935	Corporation Bus Garage, Lincoln, Lincolnshire, England	
323	Win	224–64–33 (2)	Bill Sedgwick	RTD	3 (12)	Oct 22, 1935	Spinney Hill Club, Leicester, Leicestershire, England	
322	Loss	223–64–33 (2)	Tommy Barrett	PTS	10	Oct 19, 1935	St Johns Hall, Penzance, Cornwall, England	
321	Win	223–63–33 (2)	Harry Woodward	PTS	12	Oct 16, 1935	Winter Gardens, Morecambe, Lancashire, England	
320	Win	222–63–33 (2)	Tim Doyle	DQ	2 (12)	Oct 12, 1935	Rotunda Cinema, Dublin, Ireland	
319	Loss	221–63–33 (2)	Norman Snow	KO	6 (15)	Oct 7, 1935	Windmill Club, Rushden, Northamptonshire, England	
318	Win	221–62–33 (2)	Jack Travers	KO	7 (12)	Sep 30, 1935	Co-op Hall, Darlington, County Durham, England	
317	Win	220–62–33 (2)	Danny McPherson	RTD	5 (12)	Sep 24, 1935	Spinney Hill Club, Leicester, Leicestershire, England	
316	Draw	219–62–33 (2)	Pat Haley	PTS	10	Sep 23, 1935	Theatre Royal, Loughborough, Leicestershire, England	
315	Win	219–62–32 (2)	Mark Cooper	PTS	12	Sep 21, 1935	The Stadium, Scunthorpe, Lincolnshire, England	
314	Win	218–62–32 (2)	Jack Kid Davies	PTS	12	Sep 14, 1935	Scunthorpe, Lincolnshire, England	
313	Win	217–62–32 (2)	Jack Dunn	RTD	3 (12)	Sep 5, 1935	Winter Gardens, Morecambe, Lancashire, England	
312	Win	216–62–32 (2)	Albert Moore	KO	5 (12)	Aug 17, 1935	Scunthorpe Boxing Stadium, Scunthorpe, Lincolnshire, England	
311	Loss	215–62–32 (2)	Jack Lord	TKO	3 (12)	Aug 15, 1935	Darnall Greyhound Track, Sheffield, Yorkshire, England	
310	Win	215–61–32 (2)	Tim Sheehan	PTS	12	Aug 3, 1935	Merthyr Tydfil, Wales	
309	Win	214–61–32 (2)	Mick Miller	PTS	15	Jul 29, 1935	Tivoli, Mansfield, Nottinghamshire, England	
308	Win	213–61–32 (2)	Harry Barnes	TKO	4 (10)	Jul 20, 1935	Atherstone, Warwickshire, England	
307	Win	212–61–32 (2)	Mick Miller	PTS	12	Jul 16, 1935	Mansfield, Nottinghamshire, England	
306	Win	211–61–32 (2)	Curley Charlie Merritt	PTS	12	Jul 13, 1935	Merthyr Tydfil, Wales	
305	Win	210–61–32 (2)	Cyclone Joe Warriner	PTS	12	Jul 6, 1935	Scunthorpe Boxing Stadium, Scunthorpe, Lincolnshire, England	
304	Loss	209–61–32 (2)	Billy Hughes	KO	5 (10)	Jun 27, 1935	Anfield Football Ground, Liverpool, Merseyside, England	
303	Win	209–60–32 (2)	Chris Dawson	TKO	11 (12)	Jun 23, 1935	The Arena, Mile End, London, England	
302	Win	208–60–32 (2)	Jack Bland	PTS	10	May 7, 1935	Spinney Hill Club, Leicester, Leicestershire, England	
301	Loss	207–60–32 (2)	Jake Kilrain	KO	4 (10)	May 6, 1935	Cathkin Park, Glasgow, Scotland	
300	Loss	207–59–32 (2)	George Rose	PTS	10	Apr 28, 1935	Pavilion Theatre Arena, Whitechapel, London, England	
299	Win	207–58–32 (2)	Tommy Dowlais	KO	1 (10)	Apr 15, 1935	United Trades Club, Kettering, Northamptonshire, England	
298	Loss	206–58–32 (2)	George Bunter	KO	5 (12)	Apr 8, 1935	Festival Hall, West Hartlepool, County Durham, England	
297	NC	206–57–32 (2)	Fred Lowbridge	NC	8 (12)	Apr 4, 1935	The Stadium, Liverpool, Merseyside, England	
296	Win	206–57–32 (1)	Herbie Nurse	PTS	12	Mar 18, 1935	Drill Hall, Coventry, West Midlands, England	
295	Win	205–57–32 (1)	Harry Mason	PTS	12	Mar 11, 1935	Granby Halls, Leicester, Leicestershire, England	
294	Win	204–57–32 (1)	Albert Holding	DQ	7 (12)	Mar 3, 1935	Brunswick Stadium, Leeds, Yorkshire, England	
293	Win	203–57–32 (1)	George Reynolds	PTS	12	Feb 15, 1935	Colston Hall, Bristol, Avon, England	
292	Win	202–57–32 (1)	Tommy Dowlais	PTS	12	Feb 11, 1935	United Trades Club, Kettering, Northamptonshire, England	
291	Win	201–57–32 (1)	Frankie Brown	KO	11 (12)	Feb 7, 1935	The Stadium, Liverpool, Merseyside, England	
290	Win	200–57–32 (1)	Mick Miller	PTS	10	Feb 4, 1935	Theatre Royal, Loughborough, Leicestershire, England	
289	Win	199–57–32 (1)	Billy Vincent	KO	2 (8)	Jan 29, 1935	Town Hall, Leeds, Yorkshire, England	
288	Win	198–57–32 (1)	Lyndon Bennett	PTS	12	Jan 24, 1935	West Ham Baths, West Ham, London, England	
287	Win	197–57–32 (1)	Syd Mitchell	KO	2 (10)	Jan 21, 1935	Corn Exchange, Peterborough, Cambridgeshire, England	
286	Win	196–57–32 (1)	Frank Meacham	PTS	12	Jan 17, 1935	Corn Exchange, Peterborough, Cambridgeshire, England	
285	Loss	195–57–32 (1)	Jack Lewis	KO	5 (12)	Jan 14, 1935	St Georges Hall, St Peter Port, Guernsey, Channel Islands	
284	Win	195–56–32 (1)	Harry Kid Farlo	PTS	12	Jan 10, 1935	Corn Hall, Norwich, Norfolk, England	
283	Win	194–56–32 (1)	Tiger Bert Ison	PTS	10	Jan 8, 1935	Spinney Hill Club, Leicester, Leicestershire, England	
282	Win	193–56–32 (1)	Charlie Connolly	TKO	10 (10)	Dec 23, 1934	Mile End, London, England	
281	Win	192–56–32 (1)	Arthur Sadd	PTS	12	Nov 29, 1934	Corn Hall, Norwich, Norfolk, England	
280	Win	191–56–32 (1)	Bobby Mack	PTS	12	Nov 28, 1934	Ideal Skating Rink, Harrogate, Yorkshire, England	
279	Win	190–56–32 (1)	Herbie Fraser	PTS	12	Nov 26, 1934	Bedford, Bedfordshire, England	
278	Win	189–56–32 (1)	Billy Brooks	KO	6 (12)	Nov 19, 1934	Greenwich Baths, Greenwich, London, England	
277	Win	188–56–32 (1)	Arnold Sheppard	PTS	12	Nov 15, 1934	Town Hall, Swadlincote, Derbyshire, England	
276	Win	187–56–32 (1)	Mick Miller	PTS	10	Nov 13, 1934	Leicester, Leicestershire, England	
275	Win	186–56–32 (1)	Billy Smith	PTS	10	Nov 11, 1934	The Ring, Blackfriars Road, Southwark, London, England	
274	Win	185–56–32 (1)	Joe Donnelly	PTS	12	Nov 5, 1934	Co-op Hall, Darlington, County Durham, England	
273	Draw	184–56–32 (1)	Harry Brooks	PTS	10	Oct 28, 1934	The Ring, Blackfriars Road, Southwark, London, England	
272	Draw	184–56–31 (1)	Jimmy Vaughan	PTS	12	Oct 25, 1934	Mile End, London, England	
271	Loss	184–56–30 (1)	Tiger Bert Ison	PTS	15	Oct 23, 1934	Spinney Hill Club, Leicester, Leicestershire, England	
270	Win	184–55–30 (1)	Fred Lowbridge	DQ	4 (12)	Oct 22, 1934	Wolverhampton, West Midlands, England	
269	Loss	183–55–30 (1)	Ted McGuire	PTS	12	Oct 19, 1934	Co-op Hall, Leigh, Lancashire, England	
268	Win	183–54–30 (1)	Tiger Bert Ison	PTS	10	Oct 9, 1934	Spinney Hill Club, Leicester, Leicestershire, England	
267	Loss	182–54–30 (1)	Pat Butler	KO	5 (12)	Oct 1, 1934	Granby Halls, Leicester, Leicestershire, England	
266	Draw	182–53–30 (1)	Mick Miller	PTS	12	Sep 27, 1934	Winter Gardens, Morecambe, Lancashire, England	
265	Win	182–53–29 (1)	Dennis Allott	PTS	12	Sep 23, 1934	Rialto, Sutton-in-Ashfield, Nottinghamshire, England	
264	Loss	181–53–29 (1)	Mick Miller	PTS	12	Sep 17, 1934	The Arena, Mile End, London, England	
263	Win	181–52–29 (1)	Boyo Pat Cassidy	PTS	12	Sep 9, 1934	The Arena, Mile End, London, England	
262	Loss	180–52–29 (1)	Frank Barton	PTS	10	Sep 2, 1934	Salford, Lancashire, England	
261	Draw	180–51–29 (1)	Frankie Jones	PTS	10	Aug 31, 1934	Coalville, Leicestershire, England	
260	Win	180–51–28 (1)	Boy Gavo	PTS	10	Aug 25, 1934	Wickstead Park, Kettering, Northamptonshire, England	
259	Loss	179–51–28 (1)	Jackie Flynn	KO	3 (10)	Aug 5, 1934	The Arena, Mile End, London, England	
258	Win	179–50–28 (1)	Billy Clinton	TKO	10 (10)	Jul 19, 1934	Brighton, Sussex, England	
257	Loss	178–50–28 (1)	George Daly	KO	2 (8)	Jul 11, 1934	Greyhound Stadium, Wandsworth, London, England	
256	Win	178–49–28 (1)	Eddie Gott	DQ	8 (10)	Jul 3, 1934	Spinney Hill Club, Leicester, Leicestershire, England	
255	Draw	177–49–28 (1)	Jackie Flynn	PTS	15	Jun 24, 1934	Mile End, London, England	
254	Draw	177–49–27 (1)	Con Flynn	PTS	12	Jun 21, 1934	Brighton, Sussex, England	
253	Win	177–49–26 (1)	Carl Peterson	PTS	12	Jun 19, 1934	Victoria Hall, Hanley, Staffordshire, England	
252	Draw	176–49–26 (1)	Dan Mercer	PTS	10	Jun 18, 1934	Rugby, Warwickshire, England	
251	Win	176–49–25 (1)	Boyo Pat Cassidy	PTS	8	Jun 10, 1934	Alcazar, Edmonton, London, England	
250	Win	175–49–25 (1)	Frankie Jones	PTS	10	Jun 4, 1934	Municipal Sports Ground, Derby, Derbyshire, England	
249	Win	174–49–25 (1)	Young Connolly	TKO	4 (10)	Jun 3, 1934	The Arena, Mile End, London, England	
248	Win	173–49–25 (1)	Harry Evans	PTS	12	May 21, 1934	Much Wenlock, Shropshire, England	
247	Win	172–49–25 (1)	Billy McCarthy	TKO	6 (12)	May 20, 1934	The Arena, Mile End, London, England	
246	Loss	171–49–25 (1)	Jack Kid Berg	DQ	6 (12)	May 14, 1934	Granby Halls, Leicester, Leicestershire, England	
245	Win	171–48–25 (1)	Frankie Jones	PTS	10	Apr 24, 1934	Leicester, Leicestershire, England	
244	Win	170–48–25 (1)	George Massey	PTS	10	Apr 16, 1934	Granby Halls, Leicester, Leicestershire, England	
243	Win	169–48–25 (1)	Mick Miller	PTS	10	Apr 3, 1934	Leicester, Leicestershire, England	
242	Loss	168–48–25 (1)	Ted Hinton	PTS	15	Mar 31, 1934	Merthyr Tydfil, Wales	
241	Win	168–47–25 (1)	Tom (Kid) Larkin	DQ	6 (10)	Mar 26, 1934	Victoria Baths, Nottingham, Nottinghamshire, England	
240	Win	167–47–25 (1)	George Leigh	PTS	10	Mar 10, 1934	Spalding, Lincolnshire, England	
239	Win	166–47–25 (1)	George Leigh	PTS	12	Mar 9, 1934	Blackpool, Lancashire, England	
238	Win	165–47–25 (1)	Bob Parkin	PTS	10	Mar 6, 1934	Leicester, Leicestershire, England	
237	Win	164–47–25 (1)	Jack 'Kid' McCabe	TKO	7 (10)	Mar 2, 1934	Tower Circus, Blackpool, Lancashire, England	
236	Win	163–47–25 (1)	Jack McKnight	PTS	8	Feb 25, 1934	The Ring, Belfast, Northern Ireland, England	
235	Win	162–47–25 (1)	Lyndon Bennett	PTS	10	Feb 19, 1934	Coventry, West Midlands, England	
234	Loss	161–47–25 (1)	Ted McGuire	KO	10 (12)	Feb 16, 1934	Tower Circus, Blackpool, Lancashire, England	
233	Win	161–46–25 (1)	Albert Heasman	PTS	12	Feb 15, 1934	Brighton, Sussex, England	
232	Win	160–46–25 (1)	Bob Parkin	PTS	10	Feb 13, 1934	Leicester, Leicestershire, England	
231	Loss	159–46–25 (1)	Chuck Parker	PTS	12	Feb 11, 1934	Barnsley Stadium, Barnsley, Yorkshire, England	
230	Win	159–45–25 (1)	J P Boyle	PTS	10	Feb 8, 1934	Adelphi SC, Glasgow, Scotland	
229	Win	158–45–25 (1)	George Reynolds	PTS	10	Feb 5, 1934	Selhurst Park Football Ground, Crystal Palace, London, England	
228	Win	157–45–25 (1)	Jack McKnight	PTS	10	Jan 30, 1934	Leicester, Leicestershire, England	
227	Win	156–45–25 (1)	Con Flynn	PTS	12	Jan 22, 1934	St George's Hall, Guernsey, Channel Islands	
226	Win	155–45–25 (1)	Arthur 'Ginger' Sadd	PTS	12	Jan 18, 1934	Corn Hall, Norwich, Norfolk, England	
225	Win	154–45–25 (1)	Jackie Flynn	KO	1 (12)	Jan 16, 1934	Blackpool, Lancashire, England	
224	Win	153–45–25 (1)	Johnny Waples	PTS	10	Jan 15, 1934	Selhurst Park Football Ground, Crystal Palace, London, England	
223	Win	152–45–25 (1)	Seaman Frank Read	PTS	10	Dec 1, 1933	Darwen, Lancashire, England	
222	Loss	151–45–25 (1)	George Daly	PTS	6	Nov 30, 1933	Royal Albert Hall, Kensington, London, England	
221	Draw	151–44–25 (1)	Harry Davis	PTS	10	Nov 20, 1933	Shrewsbury, Shropshire, England	
220	Loss	151–44–24 (1)	Jack 'Kid' McCabe	PTS	10	Nov 17, 1933	Darwen, Lancashire, England	
219	Loss	151–43–24 (1)	George Odwell	KO	2 (12)	Nov 13, 1933	Paddington Baths, Paddington, London, England	
218	Win	151–42–24 (1)	George Reynolds	DQ	6 (10)	Nov 3, 1933	Aylestone, Leicestershire, England	
217	Draw	150–42–24 (1)	Arthur 'Ginger' Sadd	PTS	10	Nov 2, 1933	Corn Hall, Norwich, Norfolk, England	
216	Draw	150–42–23 (1)	Frankie Jones	PTS	10	Oct 30, 1933	Granby Halls, Leicester, Leicestershire, England	
215	Win	150–42–22 (1)	Herbie Nurse	PTS	10	Oct 24, 1933	Free Trade Hall, Leicester, Leicestershire, England	
214	Win	149–42–22 (1)	Joe Rubery	PTS	12	Oct 23, 1933	Holborn Stadium, Holborn, London, England	
213	Loss	148–42–22 (1)	Herbie Nurse	PTS	10	Oct 10, 1933	Rink Market, Smethwick, West Midlands, England	
212	Win	148–41–22 (1)	Alf Paolozzi	KO	7 (10)	Oct 9, 1933	Chesterfield, Derbyshire, England	
211	Win	147–41–22 (1)	Billy Sheldon	PTS	12	Oct 8, 1933	Mile End, London, England	
210	Loss	146–41–22 (1)	Pat Butler	KO	4 (10)	Oct 3, 1933	Free Trade Hall, Leicester, Leicestershire, England	
209	Win	146–40–22 (1)	Tiger Bert Ison	PTS	8	Sep 28, 1933	The Corn Exchange, Melton Mowbray, Leicestershire, England	
208	Win	145–40–22 (1)	Tommy Higgins	RTD	9 (15)	Sep 24, 1933	The Arena, Mile End, London, England	
207	Draw	144–40–22 (1)	Jim Wheeler	PTS	12	Sep 14, 1933	Brixton Stadium, Brixton, London, England	
206	Win	144–40–21 (1)	Harry Kid Farlo	PTS	15	Sep 10, 1933	The Arena, Mile End, London, England	
205	Win	143–40–21 (1)	Tiger Bert Ison	PTS	10	Sep 5, 1933	Spinney Hill Club, Leicester, Leicestershire, England	
204	Loss	142–40–21 (1)	Pat Haley	PTS	10	Aug 29, 1933	Victoria Hall, Hanley, Staffordshire, England	
203	Win	142–39–21 (1)	Battling Lewis	RTD	6 (10)	Aug 20, 1933	Palais de Danse, West Bromwich, West Midlands, England	
202	Loss	141–39–21 (1)	George Odwell	KO	2 (12)	Jul 23, 1933	The Ring, Blackfriars Road, Southwark, London, England	
201	Win	141–38–21 (1)	Jock Ewart	PTS	10	Jul 11, 1933	Leicester, Leicestershire, England	
200	Win	140–38–21 (1)	Harry Brown	TKO	6 (10)	Jul 1, 1933	Titford Pleasure Grounds, Langley Moor, West Midlands, England	
199	Win	139–38–21 (1)	Ivor Drew	PTS	15	Jun 24, 1933	Abergavenny, Wales	
198	Win	138–38–21 (1)	Pat Butler	PTS	10	Jun 13, 1933	Leicester, Leicestershire, England	
197	Win	137–38–21 (1)	Kaiser Bates	KO	7 (10)	Jun 5, 1933	Victoria Crescent FC, Burton-on-Trent, Staffordshire, England	
196	Win	136–38–21 (1)	Ted Cullen	PTS	10	Jun 3, 1933	Skating Rink, Bedworth, Warwickshire, England	
195	Loss	135–38–21 (1)	Ted Hinton	PTS	10	May 23, 1933	Smethwick Rink Market, Smethwick, West Midlands, England	
194	Win	135–37–21 (1)	George Darley	PTS	15	May 22, 1933	Assembly Rooms, Beverley, Yorkshire, England	
193	Loss	134–37–21 (1)	Jackie Flynn	KO	2 (12)	May 7, 1933	Palais de Danse, West Bromwich, West Midlands, England	
192	Loss	134–36–21 (1)	Jimmy Walsh	KO	5 (15)	May 4, 1933	The Stadium, Liverpool, Merseyside, England	
191	Loss	134–35–21 (1)	Jack Skelly	PTS	15	Apr 24, 1933	East Kirkby, Lincolnshire, England	
190	Loss	134–34–21 (1)	Ted Hinton	PTS	12	Apr 18, 1933	Smethwick Rink Market, Smethwick, West Midlands, England	
189	Loss	134–33–21 (1)	Peter McKinley	PTS	6	Apr 13, 1933	Royal Albert Hall, Kensington, London, England	
188	Win	134–32–21 (1)	Tiger Bert Ison	PTS	10	Apr 11, 1933	Spinney Hill Club, Leicester, Leicestershire, England	
187	Win	133–32–21 (1)	Ivor Drew	PTS	8	Apr 1, 1933	The Ring, Belfast, Northern Ireland	
186	Draw	132–32–21 (1)	Jack Kirby	PTS	12	Mar 20, 1933	Highfield B C, Derby, Derbyshire, England	
185	Loss	132–32–20 (1)	Jim Learoyd	PTS	12	Mar 17, 1933	Tower Circus, Blackpool, Lancashire, England	
184	Win	132–31–20 (1)	Bryn Edwards	PTS	8	Mar 10, 1933	Tower Circus, Blackpool, Lancashire, England	
183	Win	131–31–20 (1)	Seaman Frank Read	PTS	4	Mar 3, 1933	Blackpool, Lancashire, England	
182	Win	130–31–20 (1)	George Reynolds	PTS	12	Feb 26, 1933	Palais de Danse, West Bromwich, West Midlands, England	
181	Win	129–31–20 (1)	Jimmy Rowbotham	PTS	12	Feb 5, 1933	Palais de Danse, West Bromwich, West Midlands, England	
180	Win	128–31–20 (1)	Charlie Turnock	PTS	10	Jan 30, 1933	Loughborough, Leicestershire, England	
179	Win	127–31–20 (1)	Jack Kirby	PTS	10	Jan 22, 1933	Palais de Danse, West Bromwich, West Midlands, England	
178	Win	126–31–20 (1)	Jack Lawrence	DQ	4 (6)	Jan 10, 1933	Leicester, Leicestershire, England	
177	Win	125–31–20 (1)	Jack Lawrence	PTS	6	Jan 10, 1933	Leicester, Leicestershire, England	
176	Win	124–31–20 (1)	Pat Butler	PTS	10	Jan 2, 1933	Town Hall, Loughborough, Leicestershire, England	
175	Win	123–31–20 (1)	Len Fowler	PTS	8	Jan 1, 1933	Palais de Danse, West Bromwich, West Midlands, England	
174	Draw	122–31–20 (1)	Fred Carpenter	PTS	15	Dec 17, 1932	Labour Stadium, Merthyr Tydfil, Wales	
173	Draw	122–31–19 (1)	Ginger Jones	PTS	15	Dec 10, 1932	Swansea, Wales	
172	Win	122–31–18 (1)	Bert Cantor	PTS	10	Dec 5, 1932	Baths Assembly Hall, Coventry, West Midlands, England	
171	Win	121–31–18 (1)	Bill Graham	PTS	15	Nov 30, 1932	Winter Gardens, Morecambe, Lancashire, England	
170	Win	120–31–18 (1)	Benny Plant	PTS	10	Nov 23, 1932	Corporation Baths, Dudley, West Midlands, England	
169	Win	119–31–18 (1)	Fred Carpenter	PTS	15	Nov 19, 1932	Labour Stadium, Merthyr Tydfil, Wales	
168	Win	118–31–18 (1)	Tommy Creasey	PTS	10	Nov 14, 1932	Drill Hall, Coventry, West Midlands, England	
167	Draw	117–31–18 (1)	Spud Murphy	PTS	12	Nov 10, 1932	Nelson, Lancashire, England	
166	Win	117–31–17 (1)	Tommy Cope	PTS	10	Nov 7, 1932	New Victoria Hall, Nottingham, Nottinghamshire, England	
165	Loss	116–31–17 (1)	Dick Burke	KO	1 (12)	Nov 6, 1932	Brunswick Stadium, Leeds, Yorkshire, England	
164	Win	116–30–17 (1)	Sid Gould	PTS	10	Oct 31, 1932	Theatre Royal, Loughborough, Leicestershire, England	
163	Loss	115–30–17 (1)	Cuthbert Taylor	PTS	15	Oct 29, 1932	Labour Stadium, Merthyr Tydfil, Wales	
162	Win	115–29–17 (1)	Billy Mack	PTS	10	Oct 25, 1932	Leicester, Leicestershire, England	
161	Win	114–29–17 (1)	Bill Hardy	PTS	12	Oct 18, 1932	Barrow In Furness, Cumbria, England	
160	Win	113–29–17 (1)	Johnny Britton	PTS	12	Oct 9, 1932	Brunswick Stadium, Leeds, Yorkshire, England	
159	Win	112–29–17 (1)	Harry Little Minor	PTS	12	Sep 11, 1932	Brunswick Stadium, Leeds, Yorkshire, England	
158	Win	111–29–17 (1)	Sid Gould	PTS	12	Sep 5, 1932	Loughborough, Leicestershire, England	
157	Win	110–29–17 (1)	Tiny Brown	PTS	10	Sep 3, 1932	Exhall, Coventry, West Midlands, England	
156	Win	109–29–17 (1)	Billy Smith	PTS	10	Aug 26, 1932	Bilston, West Midlands, England	
155	Win	108–29–17 (1)	Sid Gould	KO	8 (10)	Aug 23, 1932	Spinney Hill Club, Leicester, Leicestershire, England	
154	Draw	107–29–17 (1)	Billy Smith	PTS	10	Aug 12, 1932	Bilston, West Midlands, England	
153	Win	107–29–16 (1)	Arthur Ryan	PTS	6	Jul 18, 1932	Bedford, Bedfordshire, England	
152	Win	106–29–16 (1)	Arthur Ryan	KO	2 (10)	Jul 15, 1932	Rugby, Warwickshire, England	
151	Win	105–29–16 (1)	Frank Marks	PTS	10	Jul 12, 1932	Spinney Hill Club, Leicester, Leicestershire, England	
150	Win	104–29–16 (1)	Bert Sales	PTS	10	Jul 3, 1932	West Bromwich, West Midlands, England	
149	Win	103–29–16 (1)	Gene Carney	PTS	10	Jun 21, 1932	Leicester, Leicestershire, England	
148	Win	102–29–16 (1)	Albert Young Dando	PTS	10	Jun 18, 1932	Wolverhampton, West Midlands, England	
147	Win	101–29–16 (1)	Jimmy Taylor	PTS	10	Jun 13, 1932	Ice Rink, Birmingham, West Midlands, England	
146	Win	100–29–16 (1)	Tommy Dexter	PTS	10	Jun 9, 1932	Villa Marina, Douglas, Isle of Man	
145	Win	99–29–16 (1)	Tiny Brown	PTS	10	May 28, 1932	Drill Hall, Wolverhampton, West Midlands, England	
144	Loss	98–29–16 (1)	Benny Caplan	PTS	8	May 24, 1932	Granby Halls, Leicester, Leicestershire, England	
143	Win	98–28–16 (1)	Billy Cain	KO	7 (10)	May 8, 1932	Palais de Danse, West Bromwich, West Midlands, England	
142	Win	97–28–16 (1)	Billy Sheldon	PTS	10	Apr 30, 1932	Chesterfield, Derbyshire, England	
141	Win	96–28–16 (1)	Pat Butler	PTS	10	Apr 26, 1932	Leicester, Leicestershire, England	
140	Win	95–28–16 (1)	Tommy Creasey	PTS	10	Apr 19, 1932	Leicester, Leicestershire, England	
139	Win	94–28–16 (1)	Martin Yates	PTS	10	Mar 31, 1932	Birmingham, West Midlands, England	
138	Win	93–28–16 (1)	George Lovell	PTS	10	Mar 29, 1932	Leicester, Leicestershire, England	
137	Win	92–28–16 (1)	Ginger Williams	PTS	10	Mar 22, 1932	Stamford, Lincolnshire, England	
136	Win	91–28–16 (1)	Billy Mellor	KO	8 (10)	Mar 18, 1932	New Victoria Hall, Nottingham, Nottinghamshire, England	
135	Win	90–28–16 (1)	George Reynolds	PTS	10	Mar 11, 1932	Worsley, Manchester, Lancashire, England	
134	Win	89–28–16 (1)	Benny Plant	DQ	4 (12)	Mar 7, 1932	Corporation Baths, Dudley, West Midlands, England	
133	Loss	88–28–16 (1)	Charlie Rowbotham	RTD	5 (12)	Mar 1, 1932	Smethwick Rink Market, Smethwick, West Midlands, England	
132	Win	88–27–16 (1)	Mickey Walker	PTS	10	Feb 21, 1932	Wellington, Shropshire, England	
131	Win	87–27–16 (1)	George Lovell	PTS	10	Feb 16, 1932	Leicester, Leicestershire, England	
130	Loss	86–27–16 (1)	Ginger Williams	KO	6 (10)	Jan 31, 1932	Carr Rink, Batley, Yorkshire, England	
129	Win	86–26–16 (1)	Cyclone Joe Warriner	PTS	10	Jan 26, 1932	Leicester, Leicestershire, England	
128	Win	85–26–16 (1)	Johnny Copson	PTS	10	Jan 19, 1932	Rink Market, Smethwick, West Midlands, England	
127	Win	84–26–16 (1)	Harry Brown	PTS	10	Jan 18, 1932	Victoria Hall, Nottingham, Nottinghamshire, England	
126	Win	83–26–16 (1)	Tommy Dexter	PTS	10	Jan 4, 1932	Granby Halls, Leicester, Leicestershire, England	
125	Win	82–26–16 (1)	Alf Cotterill	PTS	10	Dec 27, 1931	Navigation St Arena, Walsall, West Midlands, England	
124	Win	81–26–16 (1)	Cyclone Joe Warriner	PTS	10	Dec 22, 1931	Spinney Hill Club, Leicester, Leicestershire, England	
123	Win	80–26–16 (1)	Phil Hall	PTS	10	Dec 21, 1931	Drill Hall, Wolverhampton, West Midlands, England	
122	Loss	79–26–16 (1)	Norman Snow	KO	1 (10)	Dec 14, 1931	Fanciers Club, Northampton, Northamptonshire, England	
121	Win	79–25–16 (1)	Billy Young Bennett	PTS	10	Dec 13, 1931	Batley Carr, Batley, Yorkshire, England	
120	Win	78–25–16 (1)	Harry Brown	PTS	10	Nov 30, 1931	Granby Halls, Leicester, Leicestershire, England	
119	Win	77–25–16 (1)	Albert Young Dando	PTS	10	Nov 25, 1931	Drill Hall, Wednesfield, Staffordshire, England	
118	Win	76–25–16 (1)	Albert Young Dando	PTS	10	Nov 17, 1931	Spinney Hill Club, Leicester, Leicestershire, England	
117	Win	75–25–16 (1)	Billy Mellor	PTS	12	Nov 9, 1931	Rugby, Warwickshire, England	
116	Loss	74–25–16 (1)	Charlie Rowbotham	KO	6 (10)	Nov 6, 1931	Stadium Club, Handsworth, Staffordshire, England	
115	Draw	74–24–16 (1)	Frank Marks	PTS	10	Nov 3, 1931	Town Hall, Northampton, Northamptonshire, England	
114	Draw	74–24–15 (1)	Sam Newbold	PTS	6	Oct 23, 1931	Free Trade Hall, Leicester, Leicestershire, England	
113	Win	74–24–14 (1)	Johnny Copson	KO	5 (10)	Oct 19, 1931	Lloyds Market, Smethwick, West Midlands, England	
112	Loss	73–24–14 (1)	Mickey Walker	KO	7 (10)	Oct 12, 1931	Kent Street Baths, Birmingham, West Midlands, England	Not to be confused with Mickey Walker
111	Win	73–23–14 (1)	Billy Beason	PTS	10	Oct 7, 1931	Drill Hall, Wednesfield, West Midlands, England	
110	Win	72–23–14 (1)	Arthur Ryan	PTS	15	Sep 29, 1931	Granby Halls, Leicester, Leicestershire, England	
109	Win	71–23–14 (1)	George Reynolds	PTS	10	Sep 14, 1931	Belgrave Workingmen's Club, Leicester, Leicestershire, England	
108	Loss	70–23–14 (1)	George Fielding	RTD	5 (10)	Sep 7, 1931	Market Hall, Whitchurch, Shropshire, England	
107	Win	70–22–14 (1)	Ted Cullen	PTS	10	Sep 1, 1931	Spinney Hill Club, Leicester, Leicestershire, England	
106	Loss	69–22–14 (1)	Jack Kirby	RTD	2 (10)	Aug 28, 1931	Bilston Drill Hall, Bilston, West Midlands, England	
105	Loss	69–21–14 (1)	Harry Davis	PTS	10	Aug 24, 1931	Granby Halls, Leicester, Leicestershire, England	
104	Loss	69–20–14 (1)	Siki Coulton	PTS	15	Aug 18, 1931	Spinney Hill Club, Leicester, Leicestershire, England	
103	Win	69–19–14 (1)	Albert Young Dando	KO	2 (10)	Aug 7, 1931	Bilston, West Midlands, England	
102	Win	68–19–14 (1)	Jack Stone	PTS	10	Aug 3, 1931	Coalville, Leicestershire, England	
101	Loss	67–19–14 (1)	Billy Cain	PTS	10	Jun 28, 1931	Navigation St Arena, Walsall, West Midlands, England	
100	Win	67–18–14 (1)	Ginger Williams	PTS	10	Jun 23, 1931	Leicester, Leicestershire, England	
99	Win	66–18–14 (1)	Alf Cotterill	PTS	10	Jun 20, 1931	Bilston, West Midlands, England	
98	Draw	65–18–14 (1)	Ginger Williams	PTS	4	May 25, 1931	Victoria Crescent FC, Burton-on-Trent, Staffordshire, England	
97	Draw	65–18–13 (1)	Alec Law	PTS	10	May 22, 1931	Bilston Drill Hall, Bilston, West Midlands, England	
96	Win	65–18–12 (1)	Jack Stone	PTS	10	May 19, 1931	Leicester, Leicestershire, England	
95	Loss	64–18–12 (1)	Danny Booth	KO	2 (10)	May 13, 1931	Highfield B C, Derby, Derbyshire, England	
94	Loss	64–17–12 (1)	Siki Coulton	PTS	10	May 12, 1931	Granby Halls, Leicester, Leicestershire, England	
93	Draw	64–16–12 (1)	Siki Coulton	PTS	10	Mar 28, 1931	Spinney Hill Club, Leicester, Leicestershire, England	
92	Win	64–16–11 (1)	George Siddons	PTS	10	Mar 27, 1931	Belgrave Club, Leicester, Leicestershire, England	
91	Loss	63–16–11 (1)	Sol Severns	PTS	10	Mar 20, 1931	Belgrave Workingmen's Club, Leicester, Leicestershire, England	
90	Loss	63–15–11 (1)	Jack Stone	PTS	10	Mar 17, 1931	Spinney Hill Club, Leicester, Leicestershire, England	
89	Win	63–14–11 (1)	Alf Cotterill	PTS	10	Mar 11, 1931	Kent Street Baths, Birmingham, West Midlands, England	
88	Loss	62–14–11 (1)	Harry Brown	PTS	10	Mar 9, 1931	Windmill Club, Rushden, Northamptonshire, England	
87	Loss	62–13–11 (1)	Jimmy Rowbotham	PTS	10	Mar 6, 1931	Stadium Club, Handsworth, Staffordshire, England	
86	Win	62–12–11 (1)	Colin McDonald	KO	4 (10)	Feb 23, 1931	Leicester, Leicestershire, England	
85	Win	61–12–11 (1)	Arthur Ryan	PTS	10	Feb 20, 1931	Leicester, Leicestershire, England	
84	Win	60–12–11 (1)	Sol Severns	DQ	3 (12)	Feb 16, 1931	Victoria Hall, Nottingham, Nottinghamshire, England	
83	Win	59–12–11 (1)	Cyclone Joe Warriner	DQ	4 (10)	Feb 9, 1931	Newark, Nottinghamshire, England	
82	Win	58–12–11 (1)	Jim Ashley	PTS	10	Feb 3, 1931	Granby Halls, Leicester, Leicestershire, England	
81	Draw	57–12–11 (1)	Harry Brown	PTS	12	Jan 26, 1931	Kettering Baths Hall, Kettering, Northamptonshire, England	
80	Win	57–12–10 (1)	Roy Gregory	KO	2 (10)	Jan 19, 1931	Victoria Hall, Nottingham, Nottinghamshire, England	
79	Win	56–12–10 (1)	Arthur Ryan	PTS	10	Jan 16, 1931	Corn Exchange, Newark, Nottinghamshire, England	
78	Draw	55–12–10 (1)	Drummer Hartin	PTS	10	Jan 6, 1931	Spinney Hill Club, Leicester, Leicestershire, England	
77	Win	55–12–9 (1)	Arthur Boddington	PTS	8	Dec 30, 1930	Granby Halls, Leicester, Leicestershire, England	
76	Loss	54–12–9 (1)	Archie Woodbine	PTS	10	Dec 5, 1930	Swan Gymnasium, Bilston, West Midlands, England	
75	Win	54–11–9 (1)	Ginger Williams	PTS	10	Dec 2, 1930	Leicester, Leicestershire, England	
74	Win	53–11–9 (1)	Pat Daly	PTS	10	Nov 30, 1930	Walsall, West Midlands, England	
73	Loss	52–11–9 (1)	Arley Hollingsworth	KO	3 (12)	Nov 24, 1930	South Street Hall, Sheffield, Yorkshire, England	
72	Loss	52–10–9 (1)	Billy Mellor	KO	4 (10)	Nov 19, 1930	Littleport, Cambridgeshire, England	
71	Win	52–9–9 (1)	George Reynolds	PTS	10	Nov 12, 1930	Riding School, Wolverhampton, West Midlands, England	
70	Win	51–9–9 (1)	Ginger Williams	PTS	10	Nov 11, 1930	Spinney Hill Club, Leicester, Leicestershire, England	
69	Draw	50–9–9 (1)	Les Burns	PTS	12	Nov 2, 1930	The Ring, Blackfriars Road, Southwark, London, England	
68	Win	50–9–8 (1)	Siki Coulton	KO	3 (10)	Oct 28, 1930	Spinney Hill Club, Leicester, Leicestershire, England	
67	Win	49–9–8 (1)	Arthur Boddington	DQ	3 (10)	Oct 21, 1930	Corn Exchange, Bedford, Bedfordshire, England	
66	Win	48–9–8 (1)	George Reynolds	PTS	10	Oct 20, 1930	Stourbridge, Worcestershire, England	
65	Loss	47–9–8 (1)	Douglas Parker	KO	2 (10)	Oct 6, 1930	Coliseum (Tyne Dock), South Shields, Tyne and Wear, England	
64	Win	47–8–8 (1)	Bert Prickett	KO	8 (10)	Sep 30, 1930	Spinney Hill Club, Leicester, Leicestershire, England	
63	Win	46–8–8 (1)	George Siddons	PTS	6	Sep 26, 1930	Fountain Inn, Leicester, Leicestershire, England	
62	Draw	45–8–8 (1)	Archie Woodbine	PTS	12	Aug 22, 1930	Swan Gymnasium, Bilston, West Midlands, England	
61	Loss	45–8–7 (1)	Tommy Kirk	PTS	12	Jul 30, 1930	Morpeth, Northumberland, England	
60	Win	45–7–7 (1)	Harry Brown	PTS	12	Jul 26, 1930	Alliance Football Ground, Brierley Hill, West Midlands, England	
59	Win	44–7–7 (1)	Archie Woodbine	PTS	10	Jul 25, 1930	Swan Gymnasium, Bilston, West Midlands, England	
58	Win	43–7–7 (1)	Joe Pugh	PTS	10	Jul 21, 1930	Rink Market, Smethwick, West Midlands, England	
57	Win	42–7–7 (1)	Pat Daly	PTS	10	May 27, 1930	Spinney Hill Club, Leicester, Leicestershire, England	
56	Loss	41–7–7 (1)	Archie Woodbine	PTS	10	May 18, 1930	Wolverhampton St Stadium, Walsall, West Midlands, England	
55	Win	41–6–7 (1)	Billy Carter	PTS	10	May 16, 1930	Belgrave Workingmen's Club, Leicester, England	Won vacant Leicestershire bantamweight title
54	Loss	40–6–7 (1)	Ronnie Summerton	KO	3 (15)	May 11, 1930	Palais de Danse, West Bromwich, West Midlands, England	
53	NC	40–5–7 (1)	George Lovell	ND	3	May 5, 1930	Spinney Hill Club, Leicester, Leicestershire, England	Could be exhibition but described as a no decision bout.
52	Win	40–5–7	Kid Baker	KO	5 (12)	Apr 27, 1930	Ice Rink, West Bromwich, West Midlands, England	
51	Win	39–5–7	Sandy McEwan	PTS	10	Apr 14, 1930	Spinney Hill Club, Leicester, Leicestershire, England	
50	Loss	38–5–7	Tommy Upton	KO	4 (10)	Apr 13, 1930	West Bromwich, West Midlands, England	
49	Draw	38–4–7	Billy Nutts	PTS	10	Apr 8, 1930	Spinney Hill Club, Leicester, Leicestershire, England	
48	Draw	38–4–6	Sandy McEwan	PTS	10	Mar 28, 1930	Baylis-Wiley BC, Birmingham, West Midlands, England	
47	Win	38–4–5	Reg Roberts	KO	9 (10)	Mar 25, 1930	Spinney Hill Club, Leicester, Leicestershire, England	
46	Win	37–4–5	Battling Connah	PTS	10	Mar 18, 1930	Spinney Hill Club, Leicester, Leicestershire, England	
45	Win	36–4–5	Tiger Bert Ison	PTS	10	Mar 17, 1930	Palais de Danse, Hanley, Staffordshire, England	
44	Win	35–4–5	Sandy McLeod	PTS	10	Mar 9, 1930	Palais de Danse, West Bromwich, West Midlands, England	
43	Win	34–4–5	Norman Snow	PTS	10	Mar 3, 1930	Windmill Club, Rushden, Northamptonshire, England	
42	Win	33–4–5	Young Chen	PTS	10	Feb 25, 1930	Spinney Hill Club, Leicester, Leicestershire, England	
41	Win	32–4–5	Jack Bradshaw	RTD	3 (10)	Feb 21, 1930	Belgrave Workingmen's Club, Leicester, Leicestershire, England	
40	Win	31–4–5	Jackie Kirk	PTS	10	Feb 10, 1930	Victoria Baths, Nottingham, Nottinghamshire, England	
39	Win	30–4–5	Jimmy Scott	PTS	10	Feb 9, 1930	Vale Hall, Kilburn, London, England	
38	Win	29–4–5	Tiger Bert Ison	PTS	12	Jan 31, 1930	Reginald St Baths, Derby, Derbyshire, England	
37	Draw	28–4–5	Dodger Whitney	PTS	10	Jan 21, 1930	Spinney Hill Club, Leicester, Leicestershire, England	
36	Loss	28–4–4	Eric Jones	KO	1 (10)	Jan 10, 1930	Baths Hall, Coalville, Leicestershire, England	Lost Leicester flyweight title
35	Win	28–3–4	Eddie West	PTS	10	Jan 7, 1930	Spinney Hill Club, Leicester, Leicestershire, England	
34	Draw	27–3–4	Joe Myers	PTS	15	Jan 5, 1930	Palais de Danse, West Bromwich, West Midlands, England	
33	Win	27–3–3	Jackie Kirk	PTS	12	Dec 30, 1929	Palais de Danse, Hanley, England	
32	Win	26–3–3	Nipper Foxhall	PTS	10	Dec 26, 1929	Premierland, Whitechapel, London, England	
31	Win	25–3–3	Tiger Bert Ison	PTS	10	Dec 3, 1929	Spinney Hill Club, Leicester, Leicestershire, England	Won Leicester flyweight title
30	Loss	24–3–3	Frankie Brown	KO	7 (10)	Nov 14, 1929	Premierland, Whitechapel, London, England	
29	Win	24–2–3	Harry Siddons	RTD	3 (6)	Nov 12, 1929	Spinney Hill Club, Leicester, Leicestershire, England	
28	Draw	23–2–3	Charlie Thompson	PTS	4	Oct 22, 1929	Spinney Hill Club, Leicester, Leicestershire, England	
27	Win	23–2–2	Jack Bradshaw	PTS	6	Oct 15, 1929	Spinney Hill Club, Leicester, Leicestershire, England	
26	Win	22–2–2	Tiger Bert Ison	PTS	6	Sep 13, 1929	Belgrave Workingmen's Club, Leicester, England	
25	Win	21–2–2	Norman Snow	PTS	6	Sep 10, 1929	Spinney Hill Club, Leicester, Leicestershire, England	
24	Win	20–2–2	Bobby Wood	PTS	6	Aug 27, 1929	Spinney Hill Club, Leicester, Leicestershire, England	
23	Win	19–2–2	Charlie Thompson	PTS	6	Jul 30, 1929	Spinney Hill Club, Leicester, Leicestershire, England	
22	Win	18–2–2	Tommy Upton	PTS	8	May 7, 1929	Spinney Hill Club, Leicester, Leicestershire, England	
21	Loss	17–2–2	Jack Bradshaw	PTS	8	Apr 29, 1929	Assembly Rooms, Market Harborough, Leicestershire, England	
20	Win	17–1–2	Wag Cartwright	PTS	10	Apr 16, 1929	Spinney Hill Club, Leicester, Leicestershire, England	
19	Win	16–1–2	George Pallett	PTS	6	Apr 9, 1929	Spinney Hill Club, Leicester, Leicestershire, England	
18	Win	15–1–2	Cyril Burgess	PTS	4	Apr 2, 1929	Spinney Hill Club, Leicester, Leicestershire, England	
17	Draw	14–1–2	Len Swinfield	PTS	6	Mar 19, 1929	Spinney Hill Club, Leicester, Leicestershire, England	
16	Win	14–1–1	Harry Siddons	PTS	6	Mar 11, 1929	Uppingham, Rutland, England	
15	Win	13–1–1	Tommy Cann	PTS	6	Feb 19, 1929	Spinney Hill Club, Leicester, Leicestershire, England	
14	Win	12–1–1	Len Swinfield	PTS	6	Feb 12, 1929	Spinney Hill Club, Leicester, Leicestershire, England	
13	Win	11–1–1	Tommy Cann	PTS	3	Feb 8, 1929	Tramways Institute, Leicester, Leicestershire, England	
12	Win	10–1–1	Len Swinfield	PTS	4	Feb 8, 1929	Tramways Institute, Leicester, Leicestershire, England	
11	Win	9–1–1	Bobby Wood	PTS	7 (6)	Feb 8, 1929	Tramways Institute, Leicester, Leicestershire, England	
10	Win	8–1–1	Bobby Wood	PTS	3	Feb 5, 1929	Spinney Hill Club, Leicester, Leicestershire, England	
9	Draw	7–1–1	Eric Jones	PTS	6	Jan 29, 1929	Spinney Hill Club, Leicester, Leicestershire, England	
8	Win	7–1	Bobby Wood	PTS	6	Jan 21, 1929	Co-op Hall, Rugby, Warwickshire, England	
7	Win	6–1	Bobby Wood	PTS	6	Jan 8, 1929	Spinney Hill Club, Leicester, Leicestershire, England	
6	Win	5–1	Bobby Wood	PTS	6	Jan 1, 1929	Spinney Hill Club, Leicester, Leicestershire, England	
5	Win	4–1	Harry Siddons	PTS	4	Dec 7, 1928	Baths Hall, Hinckley, Leicestershire, England	
4	Win	3–1	Bobby Wood	PTS	6	Nov 26, 1928	Baths Assembly Hall, Coventry, West Midlands, England	
3	Loss	2–1	Norman Snow	PTS	6	Nov 19, 1928	Fanciers Club, Northampton, Northamptonshire, England	
2	Win	2–0	Tommy Cann	PTS	6	Nov 13, 1928	Spinney Hill Club, Leicester, Leicestershire, England	
1	Win	1–0	Jim Young Shepherdson	KO	4 (6)	Oct 23, 1928	Spinney Hill Club, Leicester, Leicestershire, England	

Awards and achievements
Vacant Title last held by unknown	Leicester Flyweight Champion; December 3, 1929 – Jan 10, 1930	Incumbent
Preceded by Unknown	BBBofC Midlands Area Welterweight Champion; March 21, 1937 – ?	Vacant Title next held by Eric Skidmore
