= Pat Butler =

English boxer

Personal information
- Nationality: British
- Born: 13 May 1913 Rothley, Leicestershire, England
- Died: 7 March 2001 (aged 87)
- Weight: Welterweight

Boxing career

Pat Butler (16 May 1913 – 7 March 2001) was a British boxer who won the British welterweight title in 1934.

== Career ==
Born in Rothley, Leicestershire, Butler was a grocer's assistant before he began his professional career at the age of 18 with a points defeat to Len Wickwar in April 1932. In his first year, he lost several fights, but improved results, including a win over Wickwar in October 1933 led to a fight for the Leicestershire Welterweight title, which he won by beating Herbie Nurse. A run of victories, including a non-title fight against British welterweight champion Harry Mason, led to a challenge for Mason's title at Granby Halls, Leicester, in December 1934, which he won with on a points decision. By this point in his career Butler had fought 79 times, losing 13 fights. He fought several non-title fights in the month that followed and after suffering a first round defeat to Harry Woodward on 10 January 1935, he resigned as British champion, saying "I cannot go on like this. I must give up boxing for a time and take a long rest before returning to the ring." He soon returned, however, but he was hampered in 1935 by injury and illness including a septic arm, an ulcer on his eyelid, and a foot injury which turned septic. He was due to challenge Gustave Eder for his European welterweight title in March 1935, but the fight was cancelled with Butler needing to take a rest from boxing.

Butler retired after defeats to Kid Davies, Jack "Kid" Berg, and Eric Dolby in late 1935. He died in 2001.
