= Baruch Katinka =

Jewish engineer (1887–1965)

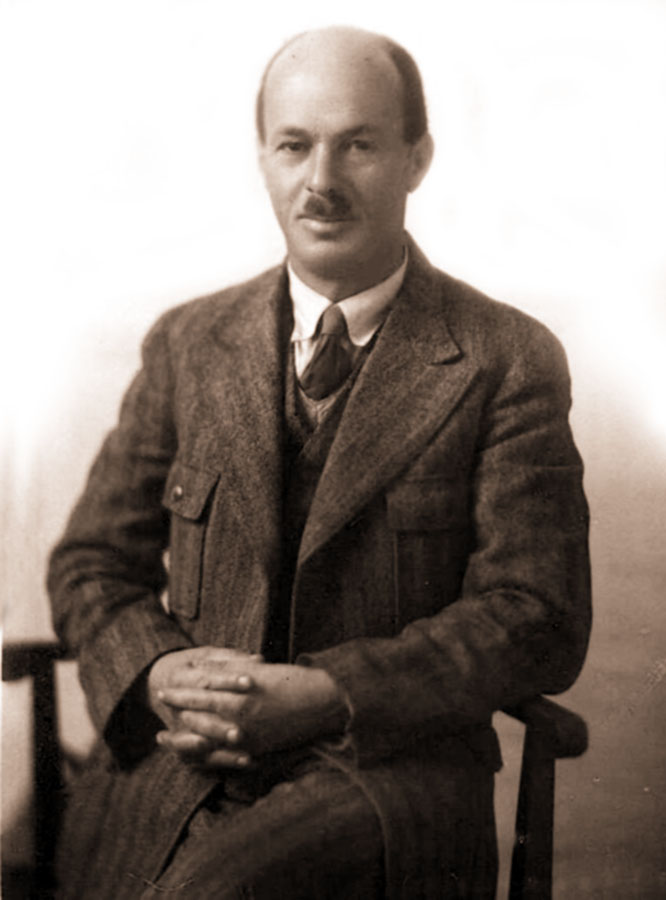
- Born: 19 March 1887; Bialystok
- Education: Technikum of Mittweida, Germany
- Occupation: Building engineer
- Known for: Palace Hotel, Jerusalem YMCA

Baruch Katinka (Hebrew: ברוך קטינקא; March 19, 1887 – April 18, 1965) was a Jewish engineer and building contractor active in Ottoman Palestine, Mandatory Palestine, and the State of Israel.

He trained as an engineer in Germany before immigrating to Ottoman Palestine in 1908. During World War I, he served in the Ottoman Army as chief technical manager of the Hejaz railway. In 1918, he invented an "air-propelled railcar" driven by an aircraft engine and propeller to transport German soldiers quickly to Haifa Port. As a Haganah defense coordinator in Jerusalem's Talpiot neighborhood, he organized the evacuation of residents, including the writer S.Y. Agnon, during the 1929 Palestine riots.

In later years, he worked as a building contractor, constructing Jerusalem landmarks including the Palace Hotel, where he hid weapons and microphones for the Haganah, the Jerusalem YMCA, and the city's main post office. He published a memoir in 1964.

== Biography ==
Baruch Katinka was born in Bialystok.As a youth, he spent a year and a half at Volozhin Yeshiva. He then studied engineering at the Technikum of Mittweida in Germany before immigrating to Ottoman Palestine in 1908. After the outbreak of World War I, he enlisted in the Ottoman Army, where he served as a railway engineer. In late 1917, he was stationed in Jerusalem. When the Ottomans retreated from Jerusalem, he was ordered to leave for Damascus. On the way, his wife Yehudit suddenly went into labor. She was rushed to the nearby Jewish colony of Yavniel, where she gave birth to a daughter, Galilya.

In Jerusalem, Katinka lived in Talpiot, near the writer S.Y. Agnon. As local defense coordinator of the neighborhood affiliated with the Haganah, he was charged with evacuating the local residents in the wake of the 1929 Palestine riots. When Agnon refused to leave his home and his valuable personal library, Katinka told him that books could be replaced but human lives could not. After the Agnon family left, Arab rioters broke into the house, looted it and burned most of the library to the ground. As Katinka was fluent in both Hebrew and Arabic, Agnon would regularly stop him on the street to discuss Hebrew terminology for modern engineering tools and construction materials, which Agnon insisted should be rooted in biblical and rabbinic language rather than foreign borrowings.

Katinka and his family subsequently moved to Jerusalem's Rehavia neighborhood.

== Engineering career ==
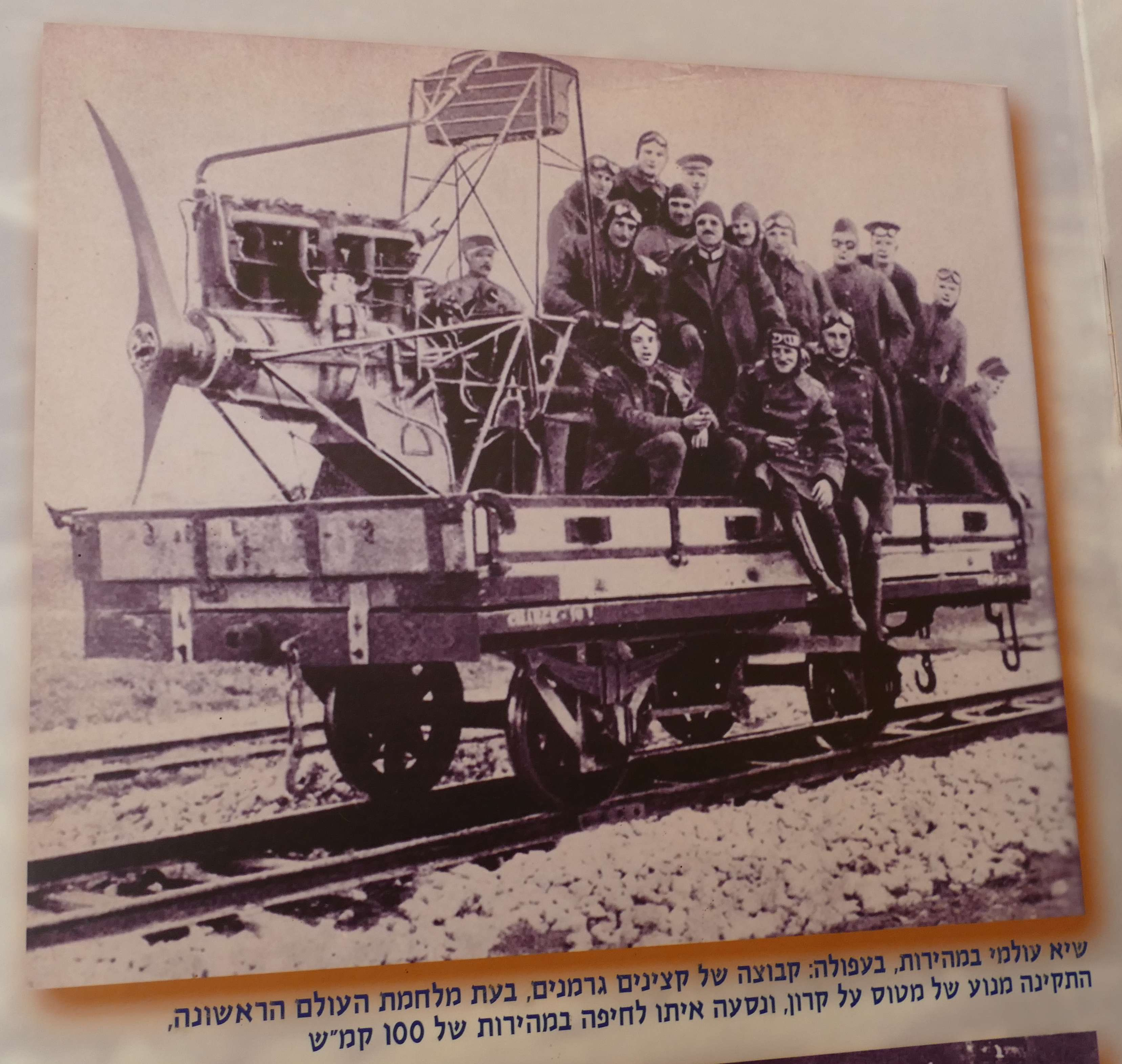
Air-propelled railcar invention

Katinka was a partner in the Albina Katinka Donia construction company. The company employed workers of all religions and ethnicities.

During World War I, Katinka served as chief technical manager for the Ottoman Empire's Hejaz railway. In 1918, when German pilots from the Bavarian Air Squadron stationed in the Jezreel Valley needed to travel quickly to Haifa port, Katinka devised an "air-propelled railcar" that reached speeds of over 80 kilometers an hour by attaching a 160-horsepower Mercedes airplane engine and propeller to a railway carriage. A historical reconstruction of Katinka's invention is on permanent show at the Semakh Historic Railway Station museum in Tzemach, Israel.

=== Palace Hotel ===
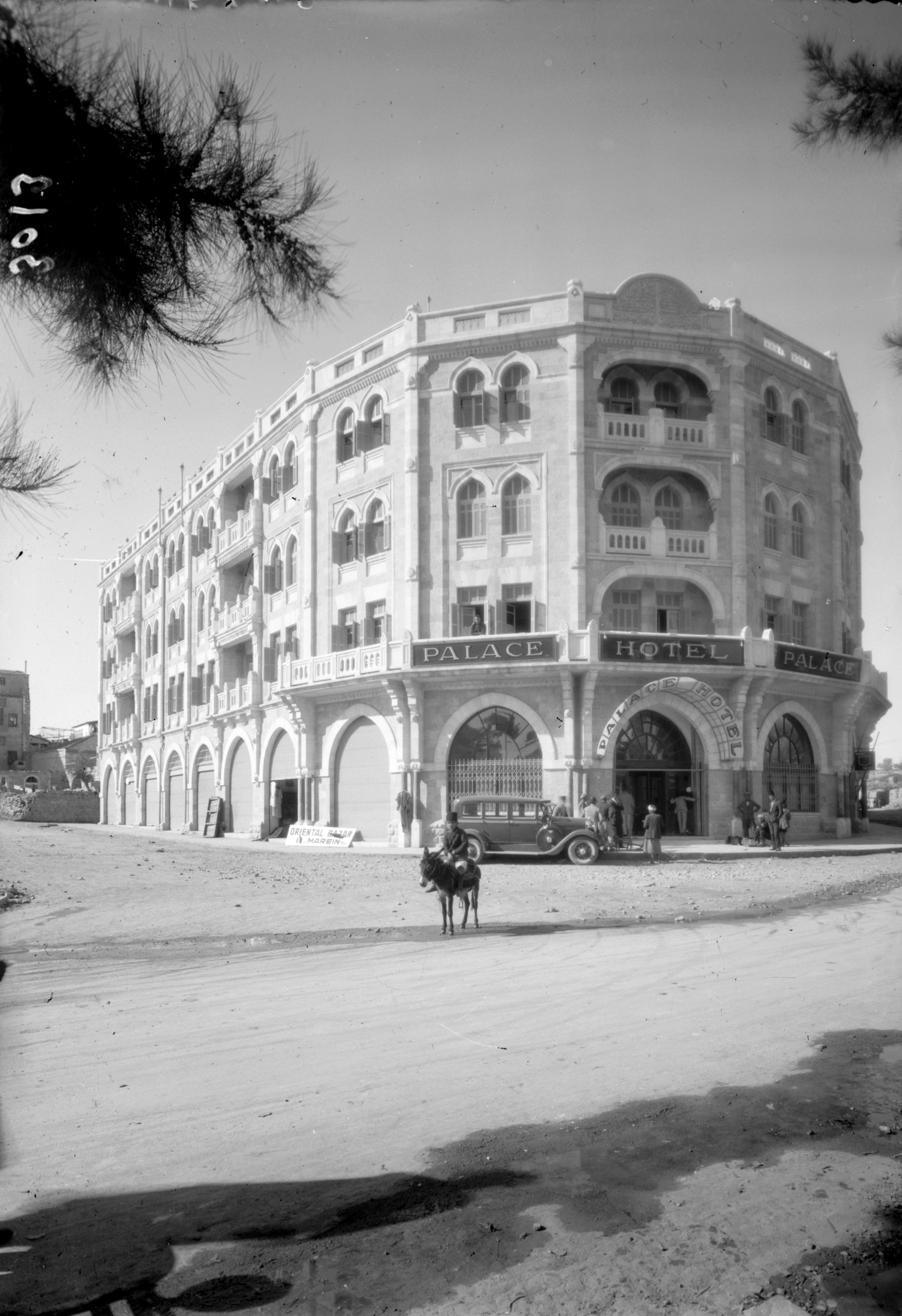
Palace Hotel, Jerusalem

The Palace Hotel in Jerusalem, commissioned by the Supreme Muslim Council, was built in 1929. The company selected to carry out the project was run by an Arab contractor and two Jewish engineers: Katinka and Chaim Weizmann's brother-in-law Tuvia Donia.In his autobiography, Katinka described the conditions of the tender, which stipulated that the project had to be finished within 13 months. If not the contractor would have to pay a penalty of 1,000 liras a day until completion. Katinka designed places where weapons could be hidden within the hotel, despite the British prohibition against Jews bearing arms for self-defense. He also planted hidden microphones in the wiring to enable the Haganah to eavesdrop on the meetings of the Peel Commission which convened at the hotel to discuss the "Palestine problem."

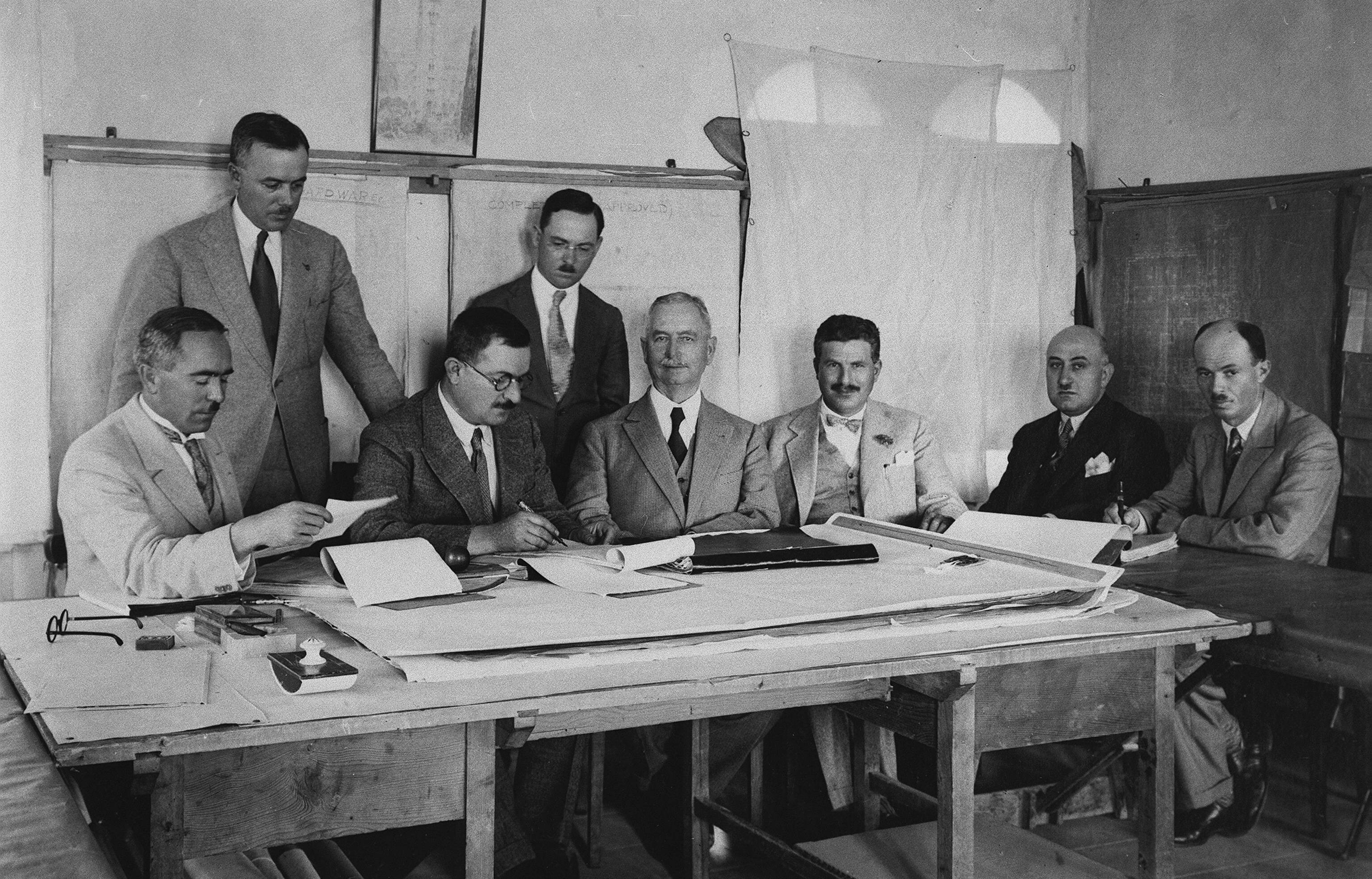
Katinka (far right) at the contract-signing for the construction of the Jerusalem YMCA, 1930

On the second day of the project, skeletons were discovered which the Mufti asked Katinka to keep secret lest the work be stopped. In his memoirs Katinka describes the Mufti as "a fairly easy person, intelligent, sharp and polite."

In his book, Katina also relates that as the workers dug the deep foundations for the hotel, they hit a natural spring that flooded the construction site. The mayor of Jerusalem, Raghib al-Nashashibi, who was a fierce political rival of the mufti, refused to connect the hotel to the municipal sewer system. Pumping the water into nearby streets was not an option, lest it flood downtown Jerusalem. So Katinka installed heavy duty pumps and created a septic tank system that purified and filtered the water, which was then routed through underground pipes into a designated reservoir in the Mamilla cemetery. This allowed the hotel to feature cutting-edge functional internal plumbing without relying on city infrastructure.

=== Jerusalem YMCA ===
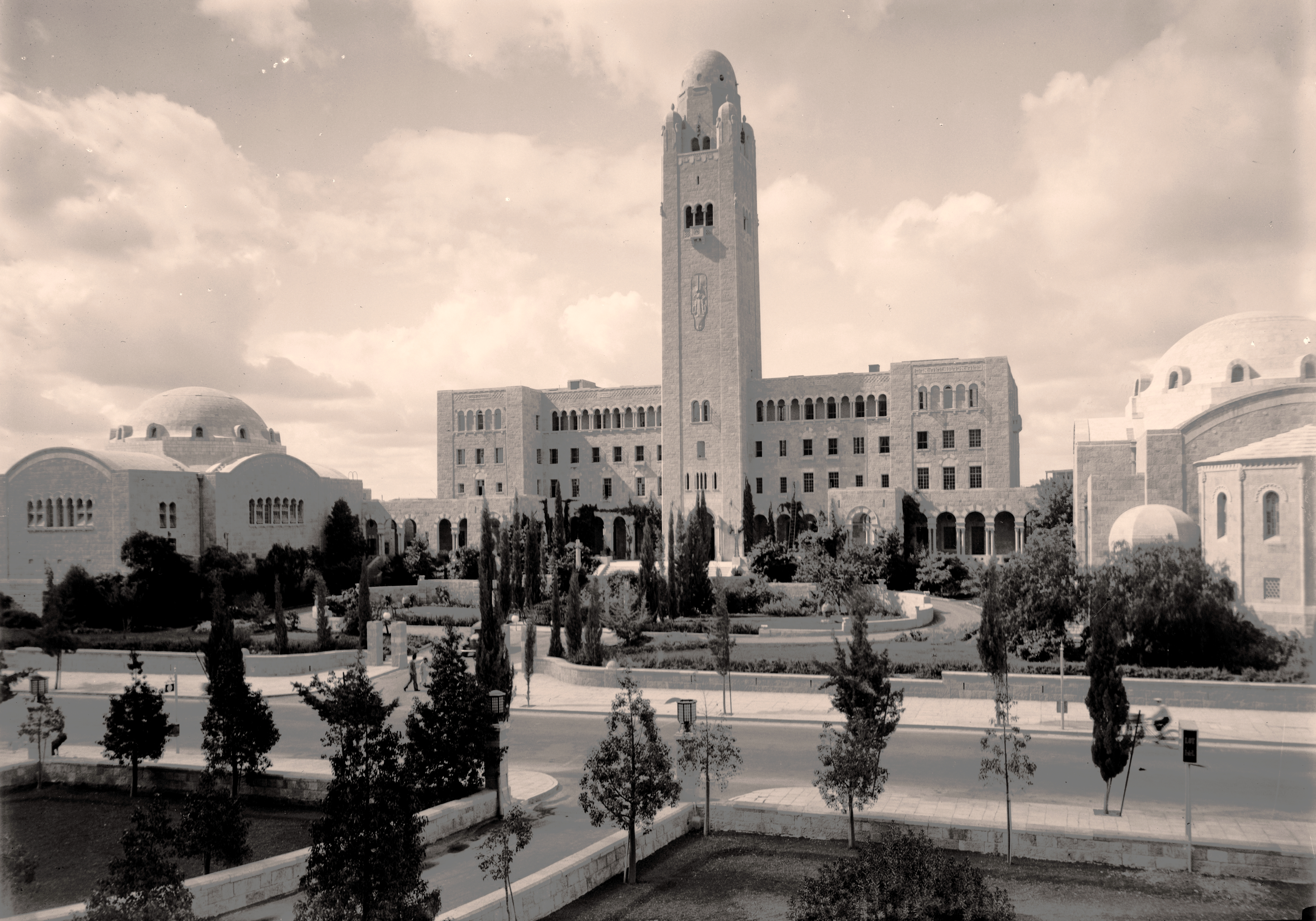
Y.M.C.A building in the 1930s

Katinka was also the contractor for the Jerusalem YMCA building with its landmark carillon tower. The Jerusalem YMCA, completed in 1933, housed Jerusalem's first indoor swimming pool, a gymnasium, a squash court and four red clay tennis courts. The auditorium also served as a primary venue for radio broadcasts of live symphonic concerts on the Palestine Broadcasting Service radio station.

=== Other projects ===
Other projects carried out by Katinka and his company include Jerusalem's main post office as well as airports and military bases across Mandate Palestine. Jerusalem mufti Amin al-Husseini commissioned Katinka to build a mansion for him in Sheikh Jarrah which he never lived in. Karm al-Mufti (the Mufti’s vineyard) was turned over to his personal secretary, George Antonius, and his wife, Katy, who held lavish parties there. It later became the Shepherd Hotel.

== Affiliation with Freemasons ==
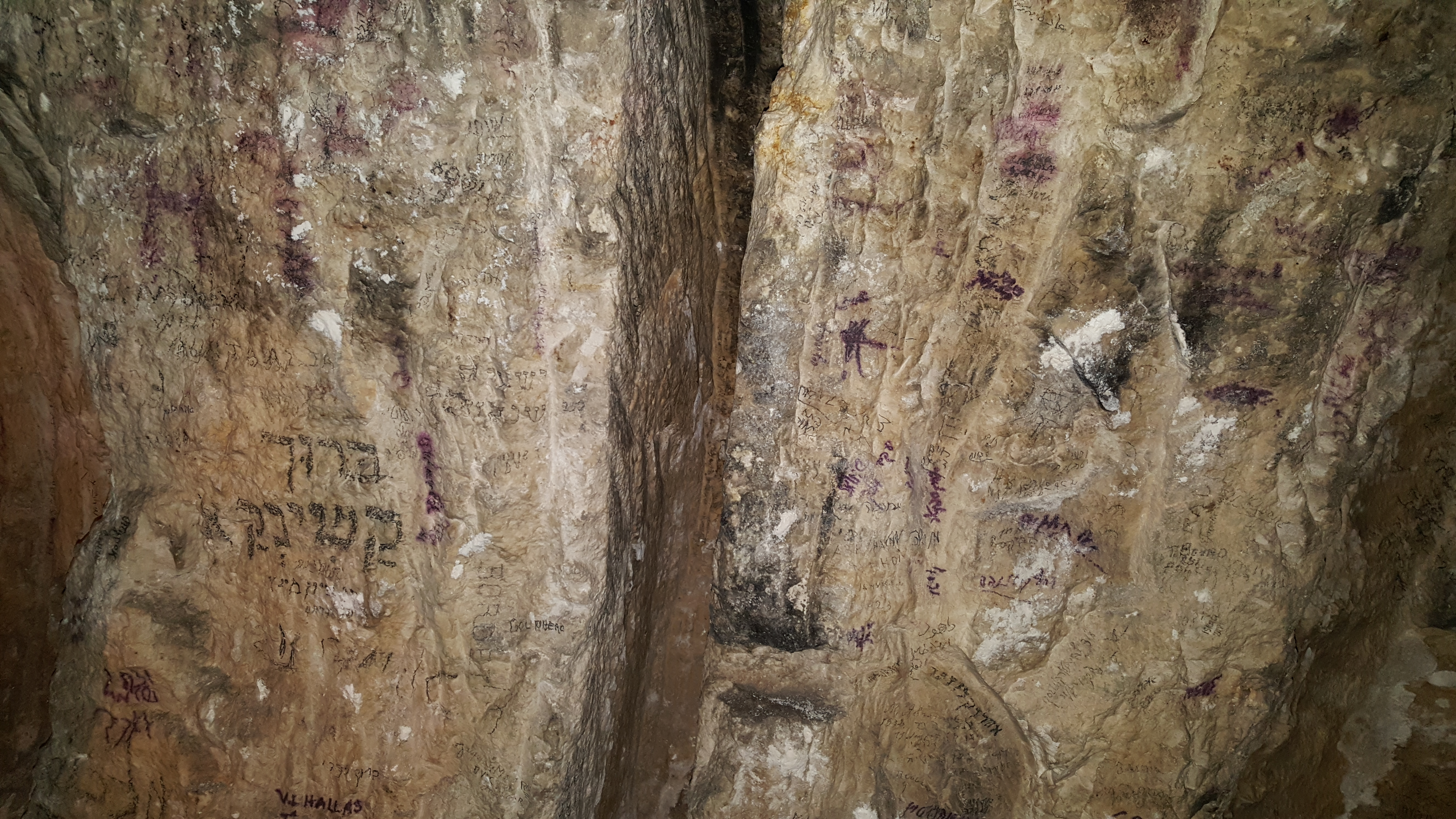
Hebrew graffiti signature of Baruch Katinka, Zedekiah's Cave, circa 1930

As a Freemason and member of Jerusalem's Mitzpeh chapter, Katinka received permission from the Mandatory authorities to use quarried blocks of stone from Zedekiah's Cave to line the walls of a small meditation room in the YMCA building. According to his memoir, he gathered twelve rough hewn stones, symbolizing the Twelve Tribes, for the construction of an altar in this room, which he brought from Beth El.

== Published works ==
- Me'az Ve'ad Hena [Ever Since Then] (Jerusalem: Kiryat Sefer, 1964, Hebrew)
