= Palace Hotel (Jerusalem) =

Hotel in Jerusalem, Israel

Coordinates: 31.78°N 35.22°E

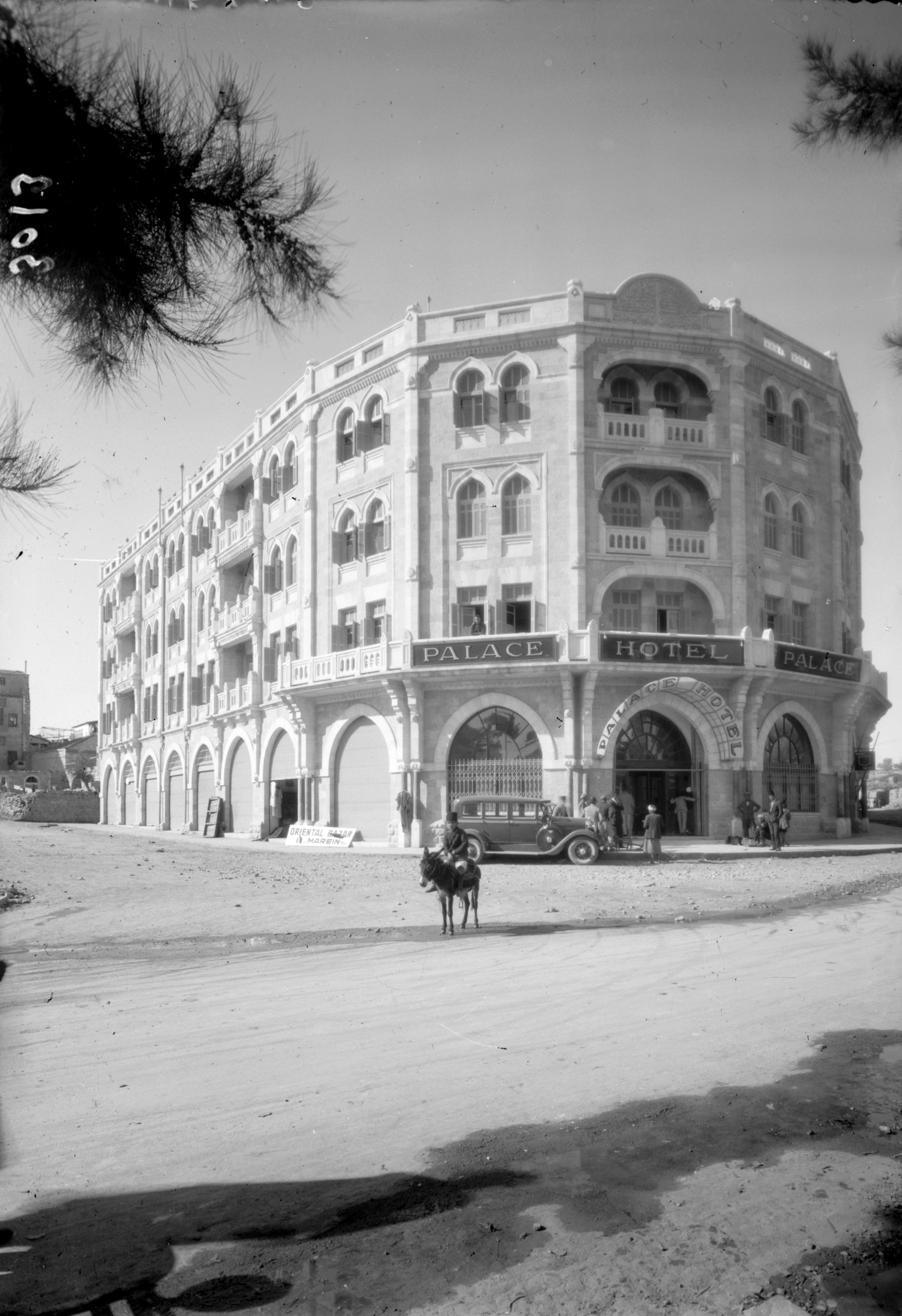
Palace Hotel, Jerusalem

The Palace Hotel (Hebrew: מלון פאלאס) was a historic hotel built across from the Mamilla Pool in Jerusalem by the Supreme Muslim Council. The hotel opened in 1929 and is now the Waldorf-Astoria Jerusalem.

== History ==
The Palace Hotel was built on Agron Street based on the plans of two Turkish architects Ahmet Kemmaledin and Mehmed Nehad, who were also hired by the Supreme Muslim Council to renovate the al-Aqsa Mosque. The builders were Tuvia Dunia and Baruch Katinka, who also built the Shepherd Hotel in Sheikh Jarrah. Construction began in 1928 and lasted 13 months. The Mufti wanted it to open before the King David Hotel and did whatever he could to expedite the construction. The Council regarded it as both an economic investment and an Arab national project. The eclectic building style was influenced by neo-Ottoman architecture but also contained Greco-Roman and Moorish elements. The Palace was one of Jerusalem's most luxurious hotels, with a stately entrance hall, marble accents, modern guest rooms and private telephones.

The first Arab Exhibition was inaugurated at the Palace Hotel in 1931, showcasing agricultural and industrial projects in the Arab world.

In April 2014, the hotel reopened as the Waldorf-Astoria Jerusalem, preserving the ornate limestone facade, rows of arched windows and floral and geometric carvings.
