= Ilan Shohat =

Israeli politician (born 1974)

- אילן שוחט
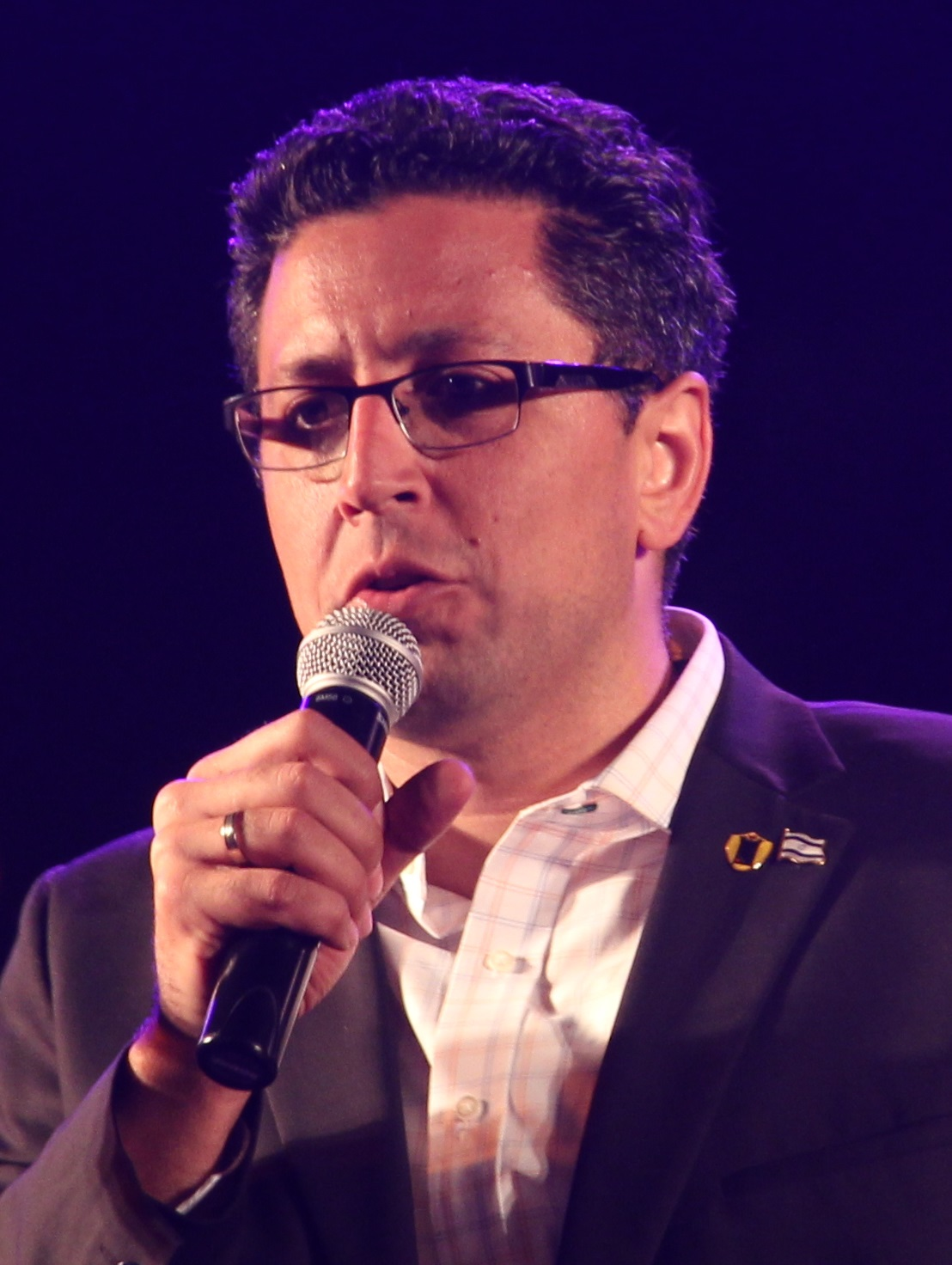
- Ilan Shohat, Mayor of Safed

Mayor of Safed
- Incumbent
- Assumed office 2008

Personal details
- Born: 21 September 1974 (age 52) Safed, Israel
- Party: Yisrael Beiteinu
- Known for: Youngest mayor in Israel.; Won a seat in the Israeli Knesset in 2015, but days before he was scheduled to be sworn in, Shohat chose not to take his seat.

Ilan Shohat (Hebrew: אילן שוחט; born 21 September 1974) is an Israeli politician, and the mayor of Safed in the Israeli Galilee since 2008.

In 2010, he was the youngest mayor in Israel. In 2015, he was elected to the Knesset, but chose not to take his seat days before he was to be sworn in. He lost his bid for re-election in 2018.

== Biography ==
Ilan Shohat was born in Safed to a Tunisian-Jewish family. He was named after his aunt Ilana Neeman, who was murdered in the Maalot massacre – the May 1974 terrorist massacre of 22 children and three adults in a Ma'a lot school by armed members of the Democratic Front for the Liberation of Palestine. He is secular.

== Mayor of Safed ==
Shohat was first elected Mayor of Safed, a city in the Israeli Galilee, in 2008. He was a representative of an independent list identified with Kadima and was supported by Yisrael Beiteinu and the Labor Party. In 2009, he visited Bowling Green, Kentucky, asking for help providing transportable bomb shelters to Israel. In 2010 Shohat was Israel's youngest mayor. In 2012, he was investigated on suspicion of taking a bribe during the 2008 elections, but the Northern District Prosecutor's Office decided to close the case.

He was re-elected Mayor easily in 2013. That year, Shohat stirred controversy when he decided that a medical school should be built in the city that would attract many non-Jewish students. In December 2014 he indicated that though he considers "the absorption of the wounded Syrians a moral and Jewish obligation of the first degree", he wanted the Israeli Health Ministry to, instead of directing wounded Syrians to hospitals in the North of Israel that are facing financial issues, send them to better-equipped hospitals in central Israel.

He ran for local office in Safed as a member of the Likud and also ran for the head of Kadima. He joined Yisrael Beiteinu in 2012.

== Election to the Israeli Knesset ==
Shohat won a seat in the Israeli Knesset in 2015 when he was in the fourth slot on the Yisrael Beiteinu list for the 2015 Knesset elections. His party received six seats in the election. One week after he was elected to the Knesset and days before he was scheduled to be sworn in, Shohat chose not to take his seat. His decision permitted MK Robert Ilatov (the next in line on the Yisrael Beiteinu list) to remain in the Knesset.

== 2018 election ==
On 30 October 2018, Shohat lost his bid for re-election as Mayor of Safed.
