= Jewish theology =

Jewish theology refers to beliefs or doctrines concerning God in Judaism, which are often considered through one of the following approaches:

- Jewish principles of faith
  - Orthodox Judaism
  - Conservative Judaism
  - Reform Judaism
  - Karaite Judaism
  - Reconstructionist Judaism

== See also ==
- God in Judaism
- Godhead in Judaism
- Jewish philosophy
- Jewish religious movements
- Jewish prayer
- Kabbalah
- Jewish mysticism
- Rabbinic Judaism
- Jewish Theological Seminary
