= The Shepherd Hotel =

Mansion in East Jerusalem, later a hotel

Shepherd Hotel
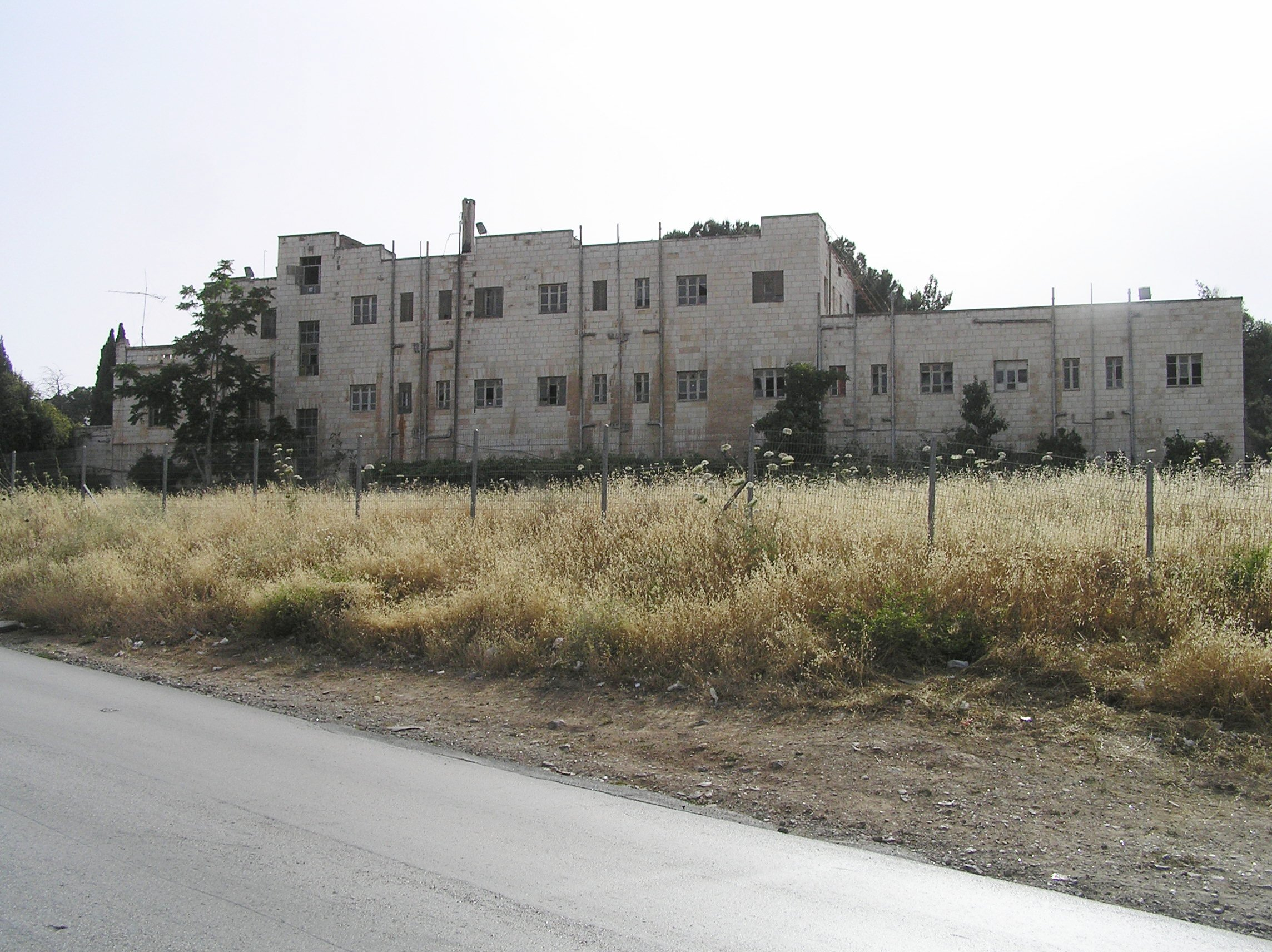
- Interactive map of the Shepherd Hotel area

General information
- Coordinates: 31.7933°N 35.2339°E

The Shepherd Hotel was a hotel in the Sheikh Jarrah neighborhood of East Jerusalem.

== History ==
The building was built in the 1930s by Baruch Katinka, a Jewish engineer and partner in the Albina Katinka Dunia construction company. It was commissioned as a home for the Muslim Mufti of Jerusalem, Haj Amin al-Husseini, who never lived there. The mufti transferred the right to live there to his personal secretary, George Antonius and his wife Katy, who were local celebrities and hosted parties and social gatherings there. After Antonius died in 1942, his widow continued to reside in the house and became involved romantically with the commander of the British forces in Palestine, Evelyn Barker.

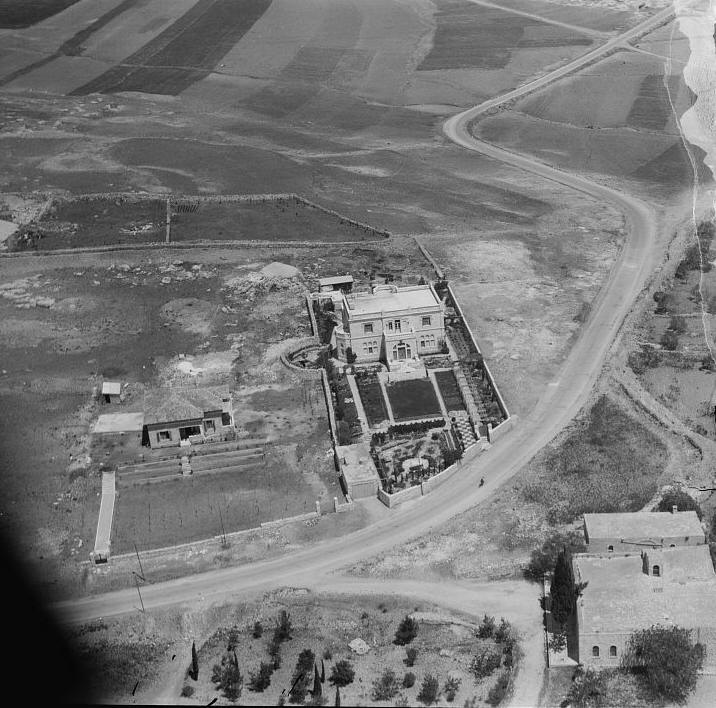
Aerial view of the Shepherd's hotel, 1933

In early 1947, Katy Antonius left the house after a nearby building was blown up by the Irgun, which claimed it tried to warn her but her telephone was constantly busy. After the establishment of the State of Israel, the building was taken over by the Hashemite Kingdom of Jordan and reopened as a hotel for pilgrims. A new wing was added which obscured the original architecture.

Following the Six-Day War, Israel occupied East Jerusalem and the hotel was declared "absentee property" (AP) and became the property of the Government of Israel under the "Absentee Property Law". It was used by the Ministry of Justice and as a district courthouse.

The land use of the building is part of Plan 2591 approved in 1982 by the Jerusalem District Committee of the Interior Ministry, and is designated for residential use.

The Custodian of Arab Property sold the building and surrounding land in 1985 to Irving Moskowitz, a Jewish-American businessman, supporter of Israeli settlers activities in East Jerusalem, who renamed it the "Sheffer Hotel." At the beginning of the first Intifada in 1987, the Border Police leased the building and stayed there for about 15 years before moving to their new building alongside Highway One.

== Demolition ==
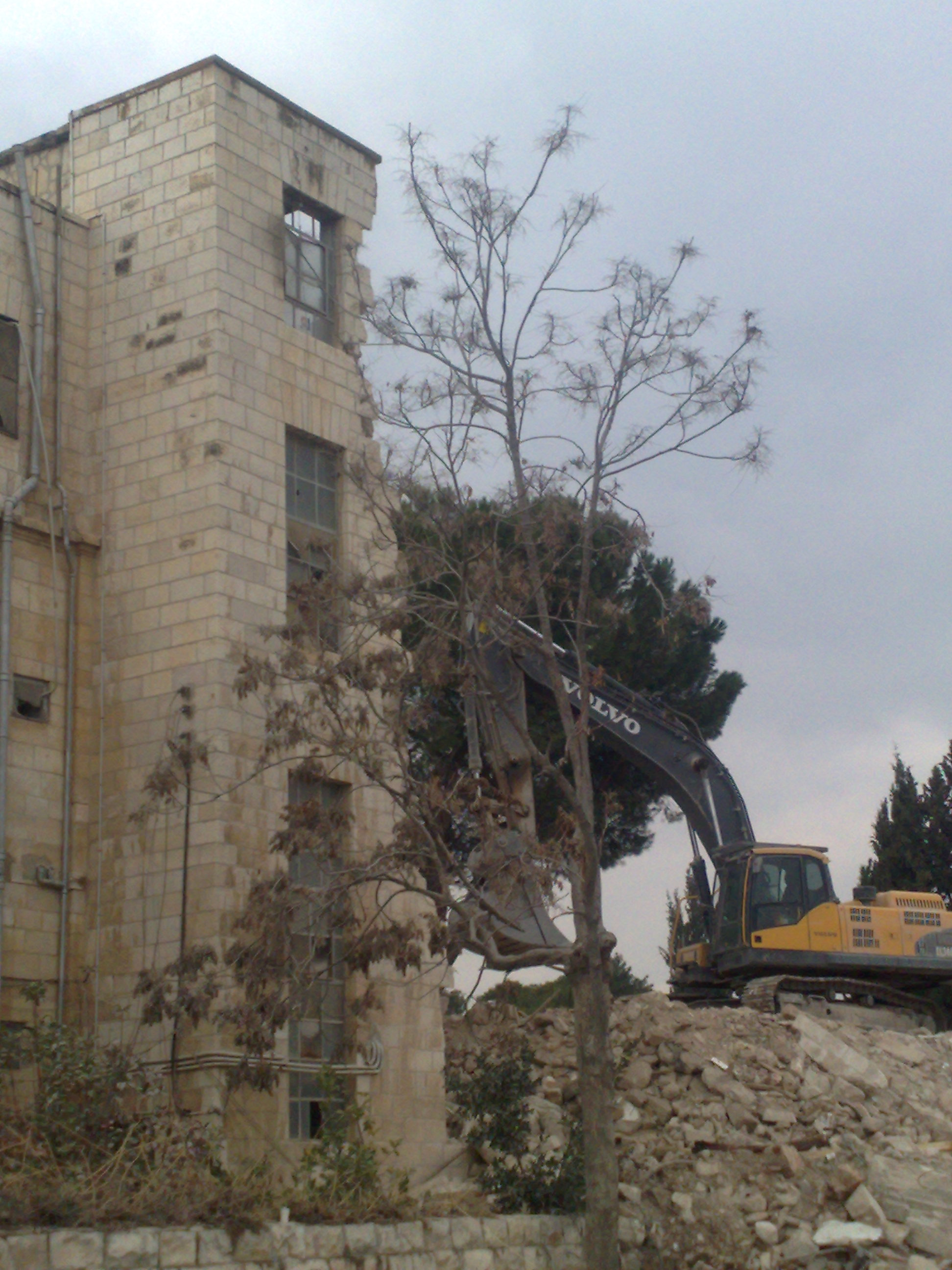
Shepherd Hotel demolition

Following the zoning of Plan 2591, a request was made on November 6, 2008 to permit construction by C and M Properties Ltd. of two new residential buildings, which include 20 apartments, underground parking, flat roofs, and two floors above the parking level.

In March 2009, the project appeared on the agenda of the licensing committee of the Jerusalem Municipality but was removed later. But on July 2, 2009, at the height of U.S. efforts to press Israel to adopt a settlement freeze in order to get the peace process going, the Local Planning Committee of the Jerusalem Municipality approved the request, which included the destruction of the existing buildings on the property, except for the historic structure designated for preservation. The U.S. government voiced its displeasure over the project to Israel's Washington ambassador in 2009 after the plan received the green light from the Municipality, a direct challenge to President Barack Obama's effort to launch negotiations toward Israeli–Palestinian and Israeli–Arab peace.

Construction was delayed for six months due to a dispute with a son of Faisal al-Husseini, a former Palestinian Authority minister for Jerusalem affairs, who claimed that the family owned part of the parking lot. The court rejected this claim. Demolition began on January 9, 2011.

The Israeli Supreme Court ruled in February 2012 that the Husseini family could not claim ownership of the landmark because too much time had passed since Israeli authorities had transferred the property to private developers.

The new building is the first settlement construction in Sheikh Jarrah since 1967.
