= George Marsden (boxer) =

English boxer

- Born: 29 November 1911; Nottingham, England
- Died: 1 June 1980 (aged 68)
- Other names: Tish
- Statistics
- Weight(s): Featherweight
- Boxing record
- Total fights: 372
- Wins: 231
- Losses: 102
- Draws: 39

George "Tish" Marsden (29 November 1911 – 1 June 1980) was an English professional boxer who fought between 1927 and 1946. He boxed at flyweight; bantamweight; featherweight and lightweight, competing in 372 professional contests.

== Professional background ==
Marsden was a Nottinghamshire boxer. He fought a total of 372 professional fights, which is the second highest amount by any boxer, only bettered by Marsden's stable mate Len Wickwar. Coincidentally, both Marsden and Wickwar died on exactly the same day in 1980.
