= Jewish Theological Seminary =

Jewish Theological Seminary may refer to:

- Jewish Theological Seminary of America
- Jewish Theological Seminary of Breslau
- Jewish Theological Seminary of Budapest
