= Robert Ilatov =

Israeli politician

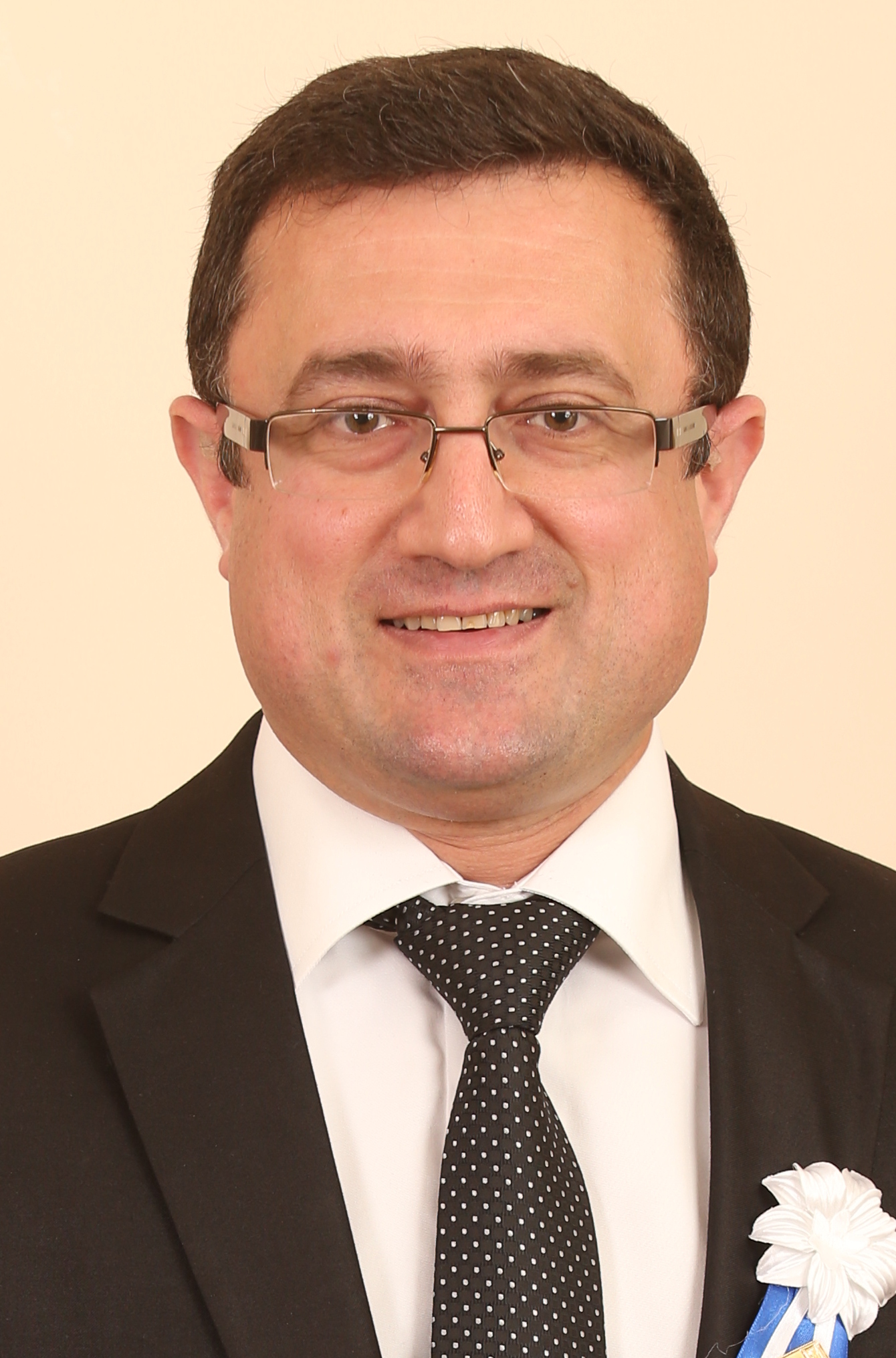
- Ilatov in 2015

Faction represented in the Knesset
- 2006–2019: Yisrael Beiteinu

Personal details
- Born: 12 November 1971 (age 54) Andijan, Soviet Union

Robert Ilatov (Hebrew: רוברט אילטוב; born 12 November 1971) is an Israeli politician and member of the Knesset for Yisrael Beiteinu.

== Early life ==
Born in Andijan in the Soviet Union (today in Uzbekistan), Ilatov emigrated to Israel on 10 April 1985. He reached the rank of sergeant during his military service in the Israel Defense Forces. Ilatov settled in Netanya and entered city politics, eventually serving as Deputy Mayor. Between 2000 and 2006 he worked in public relations for the city's Laniado Hospital.

== Political career ==
For the 2006 Knesset elections he was placed ninth on the Yisrael Beiteinu list, and became a Knesset member when the party won 11 seats. During his first term he served as the party's Parliamentary Group Chairman. He retained his seat in the 2009 elections after being placed eleventh on the party's list, and was re-elected for a third term in the 2013 elections on the joint Likud Yisrael Beiteinu list.

Placed seventh on the Yisrael Beiteinu list for the 2015 elections, it appeared that Ilatov had lost his seat as the party won only six seats. However, Safed mayor Ilan Shohat, who had been in fourth place on the list, opted to give up his Knesset seat before the swearing in ceremony, allowing Ilatov to take his place.

== Personal life ==
Ilatov currently lives in Netanya and is married with three children.
