= 2024 Israeli municipal elections =

Illustration of municipal ballot papers set to be used in 2023. Yellow ballots will be used to elect the authority's leader while white ones will be used to elect its council

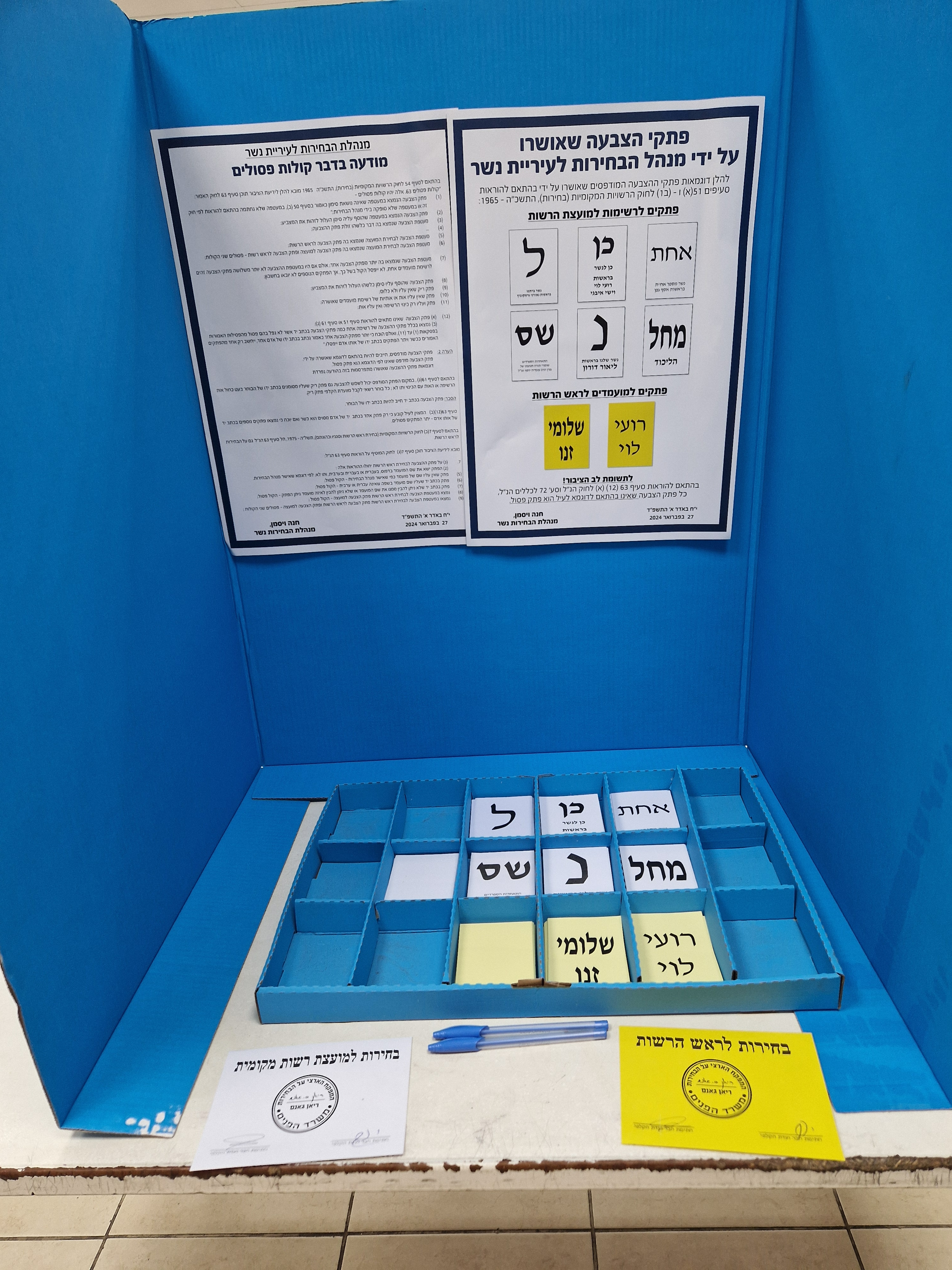
Election ballots for the mayor of Nesher and the city council of Nesher

The 2024 municipal elections in Israel took place on 27 February 2024 amidst the ongoing Gaza war. In accordance with changes made in 2018, election day will be a paid day off work. All municipalities, local councils and regional councils will be up for election, as will their leaders. Top-two runoffs will be held in all localities where no leadership candidate won 40% or more of the vote in the first round.

Voters in municipalities and local councils choose their leader and council in two separate ballots that are colored yellow and white respectively. Voters in regional councils also vote for a local committee.

== Postponements ==
The elections were originally scheduled for 31 October 2023, but were initially postponed until 30 January 2024 by the Knesset due to the Gaza war, in a law that allowed one more postponement to 27 February, subject to 80 Knesset members additional approval. Finance Minister and leader of the Religious Zionist Party Bezalel Smotrich requested that the elections be further postponed due to the number of candidates from his party that are serving in the IDF Reserves. On 1 January 2024, the Knesset postponed the elections until 27 February.

== Background and preparatory measures ==
The elections will primarily concern local and national issues, and most lists set to compete will be local.

The elections were preceded by a period of political deadlock which began in 2019 and resulted in five legislative elections over the course of three years. Several new political parties have formed since the 2018 elections, such as National Unity, while existing parties with local affiliates have either lost their seats in the Knesset (such as the Jewish Home, Meretz and the Green Party), or dissolved entirely (such as Kulanu).

The Israeli Police have prepared to protect candidates, mostly from Arab localities, who are being threatened by criminal organizations.

Municipal lists are to be submitted between 27 and 28 September 2023.

== Regional councils ==
As of May 2022, there are 54 regional councils in Israel. Voters in regional councils elect two different levels of leadership with two different ballots. One for the council's leader and one for the council's members. In some regional councils, voters also elect the members of their local committee.

=== A ===
Al-Batuf Al-Batuf Regional Council is currently led by Ahed Rahal, who was first elected in 2018.

Al-Kasom Al-Kasom Regional Council is led by Salama El Atrash, who was first elected via runoff in 2018.

Alona Alona Regional Council is led by Aryeh Sharon, who assumed office in 1999.

=== B ===
Be'er Tuvia Be'er Tuvia Regional Council is led by Kobi Avivi, who was first elected in 2018. The council's previous leader, Dror Shor, has announced his intention to challenge Avivi in the election.

Bik'at HaYarden Bik'at HaYarden Regional Council is led by David Elhayani, who became its leader in 2009. Bnei Shimon Bnei Shimon Regional Council is led by Nir Zamir, who was first elected in 2018.

Brenner Brenner Regional Council is led by Doron Shidlov, who was first elected in 2012. He was unopposed for re-election in 2018.

Bustan al-Marj Bustan al-Marj Regional Council is led by Abd Ak-Kharim Zoabi, who was first elected via runoff in 2018.

=== C ===
Central Arava Central Arava Regional Council is led by Meir Zur, who became the council's leader on 6 April 2021 following the resignation of his predecessor, Eyal Blum.

=== D ===
Drom HaSharon Drom HaSharon Regional Council is led by Oshrat Gani Gonen, who was first elected in 2018.

=== E ===
Emek HaMaayanot Emek HaMaayanot Regional Council is led by Yoram Karin, who became its leader in 2009.

Emek HaYarden Emek HaYarden Regional Council is led by Idan Greenbaum, who was first elected in a special election in 2016.

Eshkol Eshkol Regional Council is led by Gadi Yarkoni, who was first elected in a special election held in June 2015.

=== G ===
Gan Raveh Gan Raveh Regional Council is led by Shlomo Elimelech, who was first elected in 1991.

Gederot Gederot Regional Council is led by Yossi Kendelsein.

Gezer Gezer Regional Council is led by Rotem Yadlin, who was first elected in 2018.

Gilboa Gilboa Regional Council is led by Oved Nur, who was first elected via special election in 2015. Former Councillor Shanir Friedman has announced his intention to run for the council's leadership, as has Danny Atar, formerly the council's leader and a member of the Knesset.

Golan Golan Regional Council is led by Haim Rokach, who was first elected via runoff in 2018. The 2023 election will be the first to include the newly founded Trump Heights, which is part of the council's jurisdiction. Uri Kellner, a former deputy leader of the council, has announced his intention to run for its leadership.

Gush Etzion Gush Etzion Regional Council is led by Shlomo Ne'eman, who was first elected via special election in 2017. Ne'eman was re-elected via runoff in 2018.

=== H ===
Har Hevron Har Hevron Regional Council is led by Yochai Damri, who was first elected in 2013. Damri announced in May 2023 that he will not seek re-election.

Hefer Valley Hefer Valley Regional Council is led by Galit Shaul, who was elected in 2018, defeating her predecessor, Rani Eidan.

Hevel Eilot Hevel Eilot Regional Council is led by Hanan Ginat who was first elected in a special election in June 2016. Ginat was re-elected unopposed in 2018.

Hevel Modi'in Hevel Modi'in Regional Council is led by Shimon Susan.

Hevel Yavne Hevel Yavne Regional Council is led by Moshe Liber, who was first elected in 2013.

Hof Ashkelon Hof Ashkelon Regional Council is led by Itamar Revivo, who was first elected via runoff in 2018.

Hof HaCarmel Hof HaCarmel Regional Council is led by Assif Izak, who was first elected in 2018.

Hof HaSharon Hof HaSharon Regional Council is led by Eliyahu Bracha, who was first elected via special election in 2009. Bracha was re-elected unopposed in 2018.

=== J ===
Jezreel Valley Jezreel Valley Regional Council is led by Eyal Baser, who became its leader in 2006.

=== L ===
Lakhish Lakhish Regional Council is led by Danny Moravia, who became its leader in 2004. Moravia announced in November 2022 that he won't seek re-election.

Lev HaSharon Lev HaSharon Regional Council is led by Amir Ritov, who became its leader in 2007.

Lower Galilee Lower Galilee Regional Council is led by Nitzan Peleg, who was first elected in 2018. Asher Cohen, who ran against Peleg in 2018, has expressed an interest in challenging Peleg in 2023.

=== M ===
Ma'ale Yosef Ma'ale Yosef Regional Council is led by Shimon Guetta, who was first elected in December 2012. Guetta was re-elected for a second term in 2018.

Mateh Asher Mateh Asher Regional Council is led by Moshe Davidovich, who was first elected in 2018.

Mateh Binyamin Mateh Binyamin Regional Council is led by Yisrael Gantz, who was first elected in 2018.

Mateh Yehuda Mateh Yehuda Regional Council is led by Niv Vizel, who was first elected in 2018. In May 2022, Interior Minister Ayelet Shaked began the process of establishing a separate authority in Tzur Hadassah.

Megiddo Megiddo Regional Council is led by Itzik Kholavski, who is seeking a third term in office. Kholavski will be challenged by Ruti Baum and Nehamia Rievi.

Megilot Megilot Regional Council is led by Aryeh Cohen, who became its leader in 2015.

Menashe Menashe Regional Council is led by Ilan Sadeh, who became its leader in 1992. Sadeh was re-elected unopposed in 2018.

Merhavim Merhavim Regional Council is led by Shai Hajaj, who became its leader in 2012. Hajaj was re-elected unopposed in 2018.

Merom HaGalil Merom HaGalil Regional Council is led by Amit Sofer, was first elected in 2009.

Mevo'ot HaHermon Mevo'ot HaHermon Regional Council is led by Benny Ben-Muvhar, who became its leader in 2002.

Misgav Misgav Regional Council is led by Danny Avri, who became its leader in 2018.

=== N ===
Nahal Sorek Nahal Sorek Regional Council is led by Shay Reichner, who was elected in a special election in October 2021 after his predecessor resigned to serve as head of the Israel Antiquities Authority.

Neve Midbar Neve Midbar Regional Council is led by Ibrahim Al-Huasla, who was first elected in the council's first ever election in 2016.

=== R ===
Ramat HaNegev Ramat HaNegev Regional Council is led by Eran Doron, who became its leader in 2017.

=== S ===
Sdot Dan Sdot Dan Regional Council is led by David Yifrach, who was first elected in 2013. Yifrach was re-elected unopposed in 2018.

Sdot Negev Sdot Negev Regional Council is led by Tamir Idan, who was first elected in 2012.

Sha'ar HaNegev Sha'ar HaNegev Regional Council is led by Ofir Libstein, who was elected in 2018, defeating Nira Shpak, who later became a member of the Knesset for Yesh Atid. In September 2022, Shpak announced that she would not seek re-election to the Knesset, and would instead run for the council's leadership a second time. On 7 October 2023, Libstein was shot dead in the Kfar Aza massacre.

Shafir Shafir Regional Council is led by Adir Ne'eman, who was first elected in 2018.

Shomron Shomron Regional Council is led by Yossi Dagan, who was first elected in 2015 to replace Gershon Mesika. Dagan was re-elected in 2018.

In May 2022, two settlements within the council, Sha'arei Tikva and Etz Efraim, were merged into a single settlement, Sha'ar HaShomron.

=== T ===
Tamar Tamar Regional Council is led by Nir Vagner, who was elected in a November 2019 special election to replace his predecessor.

=== U ===
Upper Galilee Upper Galilee Regional Council is led by Giora Salz, who will not seek re-election in 2023.

=== Z ===
Zevulun Zevulun Regional Council is led by Amos Netzer who was first elected via runoff in 2018.

== Cities and local councils ==
Abu Ghosh Abu Ghosh is led by Salim Jaber, who is serving his fourth, nonconsecutive term. On 8 May 2022, Abu Ghosh's local council was dissolved after it failed to pass a budget, and was temporarily replaced with an Interior Ministry committee, the Ministry also held a hearing on removing Jaber from his post, but decided against it.

Abu Snan Abu Snan is led by Fauzi Mashlab, who was elected in 2018 via runoff.

Alfei Menashe Alfei Menashe is led by Shy Rosenzweig, who was first elected in 2018.

Ariel Ariel is led by Eliyau Shaviro, who became its mayor in March 2013 following the death of his predecessor, Ron Nachman.

Ashdod Ashdod is led by Yehiel Lasri, who was first elected in 2008.

Ashkelon Ashkelon is led by Tomer Glam, who became its acting mayor in 2017 and was elected to a full term in 2018.

Azor Azor is led by Aryeh Pechter, who became its leader in 2008.

Baqa al-Gharbiyye Baqa al-Gharbiyye held its municipal election in 2019, rather than in 2018. Rayyid Daka won the election via runoff.

Baqa al-Gharbiyye's council consists of 15 seats, presently held by eleven different parties. Daka was not elected to the council and is thus its sixteenth member.

Basma Basma is led by Reyad Kabha, who was elected in 2013. He previously led Basma from 2005 to 2009.

Basmat Tab'un Basmat Tab'un is led by Rayyid Zubidat, who was first elected in 2018 via runoff.

Bat Yam In 2017, Interior Minister Aryeh Deri made the decision to merge Bat Yam into Tel Aviv, which would have made the 2018 election Bat Yam's last. Deri reversed his decision in 2021, shortly before the end of his tenure as Interior Minister, due to a successful effort to reduce the city's deficit. In the 2018 election, Likud member Zvika Brot defeated incumbent Mayor Yossi Bachar via runoff. Former Mayor Shlomo Lahiani, who was removed from office in 2015 after being found guilty of Breach of Trust, is considered a potential candidate in 2023, while Bachar has announced his intention to run.

Beersheba Beersheba is led by Ruvik Danilovich, who was first elected in 2008. In 2018, Danilovich was re-elected with 92% of the vote, while his party won 16 of the council's 31 seats.

Be'er Ya'akov Be'er Ya'akov is led by Nissim Gozlan, who was first elected in 2003. In 2021, Be'er Ya'akov's classification was changed from a local council to a city.

Beit Aryeh-Ofarim Beit Aryeh-Ofarim is led by Yehuda Alboym, who was first elected in 2018. On 8 May 2022, Beit Aryeh-Ofarim's council was dissolved, after failing to pass a budget, and replaced by an Interior Ministry committee. The Ministry also held a hearing on removing Alboym from his post, but decided against it.

Beit Dagan Beit Dagan is led by Eli Dadon, who was first elected in 2018.

Beit Dagan's council consists of nine seats, five held by the Local Movement for Beit Dagan and four by the Tnufa Neto party. Dadon's party was not elected to the council, but he serves as its tenth member.

Beit El Beit El is led by Shai Alon, who was first elected in 2013.

Beit El's council consists of nine seats divided between three parties.

Beit Jann Beit Jann is led by Radi Nagam, who was first elected via runoff in 2018.

Beit She'an Beit She'an is led by Jackie Levy, who was elected in 2018. Levy had previously served as the city's mayor between 2003 and 2013. In August 2022, soccer player Eitan Tayeb announced his intention to challenge Levy, with city councilwoman Oshrat Barel announcing her own campaign in October, while former mayor Rafi Ben Shitrit and Noam Juma announced their campaigns in November.

Beit Shemesh Beit Shemesh is led by Aliza Bloch, who was first elected in 2018.

Beit Shemesh's council consists of 21 seats held by six parties.

Beitar Illit Beitar Illit is led by Meir Rubinstein, who became the mayor in 2007.

Beitar Illit's council consists of 17 seats presently held by six parties. Rubinstein's party was not elected to the council, but he serves as its twenty-second member.

Bi'ina Bi'ina is led by Ali Khalil, who was first elected in 2018.

Binyamina-Giv'at Ada Binyamina-Giv'at Ada is led by Itay Viceberg, who became its leader in 2017 after his predecessor, Pinhas Zu-Aretz, died. Viceberg will not seek re-election in 2023.

Binyamina-Giv'at Ada's council consists of 13 seats, presently held by five parties.

Bnei Ayish Bnei Ayish is led by Aryeh Gerale, a member of Likud, who was first elected in 2013.

Bir al-Maksur Bir al-Maksur is led by Khaled Hujirat, who was first elected in 2018.

Bir al-Maksur's council consists of nine seats divided between seven parties.

Bnei Brak Bnei Brak is led by Avraham Rubinstein.

Bnei Brak's council consists of 27 seats, with Rubinstein's party, a local chapter of United Torah Judaism, holding sixteen seats. Shas holds six seats, Bnei Torah holds three, while Yachad and Likud hold one seat each.

Bu'eine Nujeidat Bu'eine Nujeidat is led by Munir Hamuda, who was first elected in 2018.

Buq'ata Buq'ata is one of four local councils in the Golan Heights who were managed, until 2018, by Israeli-appointed local residents, and who first held local elections in 2018. Most local residents boycotted the election, leading to Abbas Abu Awad and his party winning unopposed.

Daburiyya Daburiyya is led by Zuhir Yousafia.

Daliyat al-Karmel Daliyat al-Karmel is led by Rafik Halabi, who was first elected in 2018.

Deir al-Asad Deir al-Asad is led by Ahmed Dabbah, who was elected in 2018 via runoff.

Deir Hanna Deir Hanna is led by Qasem Salam.

Dimona Dimona is led by Benny Biton, who was first elected in 2013.

Efrat Efrat is led by Oded Revivi, who was first elected in 2008.

Eilat Eilat is led by Eli Lankri, who became the city's acting mayor in June 2021 after his predecessor, Meir Yitzhak Halevi, was elected to the Knesset. In August, Lankri defeated former mayor Gabi Kadosh in a special election to complete Halevi's term, winning 44.7% of the vote to Kadosh's 41.2%.

El'ad El'ad is led by Israel Porush, who was first elected in 2013 and subsequently re-elected in 2018 after his main rival, Yitzhak Pindrus, was disqualified by the Supreme Court for not living in the city. Porush will seek re-election and be opposed by Shas candidate Yehuda Butbul, who chairs the party's local chapter.

Elkana Elkana is led by Asaf Mintzer, who was first elected in 2013.

9 Members were elected to the council in 2018. five from Mitzner's party, and two from the "Our Elkana" and "Young Elkana" lists respectively.

Elyakhin Elyakhin is led by Sharoni Azuri, who was elected in 2018, unseating his predecessor. Azuri's party won five seats on Elyakhin's nine-seat council.

Even Yehuda Even Yehuda is led by Avi Harari, who was first elected in 2013 and re-elected unopposed in 2018.

Harari's party, a broad-tent alliance of smaller parties, won ten out of the council's eleven seats in 2018. The Be'ad party, led by Zohar Abramov, won the remaining seat.

Gan Yavne Gan Yavne is led by Aharon Dror, who was first elected in 2003.

Ganei Tikva Ganei Tikva is led by Lizzie Delrica, who was first elected in 2013.

Gedera Gedera is led by Yoel Gamliel, who was first elected in 2008.

Ghajar Ghajar, which is partially in Lebanon, is led by Ahmad Fatali, who was first elected in 2003, replacing his uncle.

Giv'at Shmuel Giv'at Shmuel is led by Yossi Brodny, who was first elected in 2008. Brodny ran for a seat in the Knesset in 2022 as part of The Jewish Home but was not elected.

Givat Ze'ev Giv'at Ze'ev is led by Yossi Avrahami, who was first elected in 2008.

Givatayim Givatayim is led by Ran Kunik, who was first elected in 2013. Kunik was re-elected unopposed in 2018.

Givatayim's council consists of fifteen seats held by seven parties.

Hadera Hadera is led by Zvika Gendelman, who was first elected in 2018. In October 2021, Gendelman was charged with Fraud and Breach of Trust, and received a six-month suspension in January 2021, with Nir Ben-Haim serving as acting mayor during that period.

Haifa

Haifa is led by Einat Kalisch-Rotem, who was first elected in 2018, defeating incumbent Yona Yahav.

Haifa's council consists of 31 seats, presently held by 15 different parties.

In July 2021, parties in the City Council formed the Change Council, an informal coalition of parties opposing Rotem, which holds a majority on the City Council. Later that month, two of Rotem's deputy mayors were removed from office by the City Council, and replaced by Change Council members in August.

Lawyer David Etzioni, with the support of City Councillor Tammy Barak, has announced his candidacy for Mayor. As has former deputy mayor Israel Savyon, who will lead a pensioners party.

Har Adar Har Adar is led by Haim Mandel Shaked, who was first elected in 2018.

Harish Harish is led by Yitzhak Keshet, who was first elected in 2013. Harish was a Local council until May 2022, when it was declared a City due to rapid population growth.

In September 2021, Yitzhak Bachar announced his intention to run for Mayor, as did Yamina activist Yossi Ezrahi. The Liberal Party will seek election to the city council.

Hatzor HaGlilit Hatzor HaGlilit is led by Shimon Swissa, who was first elected in 2008.

Herzliya Herzliya is led by Moshe Fadlon, who was first elected in 2013.

Herzliya's council consists of 21 seats presently held by 12 different parties.

Hod HaSharon Hod HaSharon is led by Amir Kochavi, who was first elected via runoff in 2018.

Holon Holon is led by Moti Sasson, who was first elected in 1993.

Hura Hura is led by Habas Al-Atuna, who was first elected in 2018.

Hurfeish Hurfeish is led by Rafik Mari, who was first elected in 2018.

I'billin I'billin is led by Ma'amun Sheikh, who was first elected in 2010.

Iksal Iksal is led by Muhammad Shalbi, who was first elected in 2018.

Jadeidi-Makr Jadeidi-Makr is led by Suhil Malhan, who was first elected in 2018 via runoff.

Jaljulia Jaljulia is led by Darwish Rabi, who was first elected in 2018.

Jatt Jatt held its municipal election in 2019, rather than in 2018. Khaled Gara was elected, defeating incumbent Muhammad Watad.

Jatts council consists of 11 seats, presently held by nine different parties. Gara was not elected to the council and is thus its twelfth member.

Jerusalem

Jerusalem's Mayor is Moshe Lion, who was first elected in 2018, defeating Ofer Berkovitch in a runoff.

Jerusalem's council consists of 31 seats, with Lion, whose party didn't win seats on the council, serving as its 32nd member. Lion's party later merged with the local chapter of Likud. 5 seats are held by Berkovitch's party, Hitorerut. 6 seats are held by Degel HaTorah, 5 are held by Shas, 3 are held by Agudat Yisrael, 2 seats are held by Likud, 2 by Aryeh King's United Party, 2 by Hagit Moshe's The Jewish Home, 2 by the Jerusalem will Succeed party, 1 by Meretz, 1 by Bnei Torah, and one by the Saving Jerusalem list. Hitorerut initially held seven seats, but were reduced to five after two members left the party in April 2021 and formed the Together in Jerusalem party.

In October 2022, Ofer Berkovitch announced that he will not seek re-election to the City Council, and resigned as Hitorerut's leader. He was succeeded as leader by Councillor Adir Schwartz.

An Arab party will seek election to the council in 2023.

Jish Jish is led by Alias Alias, who is serving his fifth nonconsecutive term.

9 people were elected to the council in 2018 from six different parties.

Jisr az-Zarqa Jisr az-Zarqa is led by Muhammad Amash, who was first elected in 2013.

Julis Julis is led by Vassam Nabuni, who was first elected in 2018 via runoff.

Ka'abiyye-Tabbash-Hajajre Ka'abiyye-Tabbash-Hajajre is led by Rafa Hajajra, who was first elected in 2018 via runoff.

Kabul Kabul is led by Salah Riyyan, who was re-elected via runoff in 2018.

Kafr Bara Kafr Bara is led by Mahmud Asi.

Kafr Bara's council consists of nine seats presently held by nine parties.

Kafr Manda In 2018, Kafr Manda held a municipal election, in which Munas Abd Al-Halim defeated Ali Zeidan. After the result was appealed, the election was voided and redone on 22 February 2022, with Zeidan defeating Al-Halim in the redo.

Kafr Qara Kafr Qara is led by Paras Bdahi, who was elected in 2018 via runoff.

Kafr Qasim Kafr Qasim is led by Adal Badir.

Kafr Yasif Kafr Yasif is led by Shadi Zidan, who was first elected in 2018.

Karmiel Karmiel is led by Moshe Kuninsky who was first elected in 2018. In January 2023, Alon Azulai, a member of Likud and former Kuninsky aide, announced his intention to run for mayor, alleging that Kuninsky's wife attempted to blackmail him.

Kaukab Abu Al-Hija Kaukab Abu al-Hija is led by Zaher Salah.

Kfar Saba Kfar Saba is led by Rafi Saar, who was first elected via runoff in 2018.

Kfar Shmaryahu Kfar Shmaryahu is led by Serg Kurshi.

Kfar Shmaryahu's council consists of seven seats presently held by three parties.

Kfar Tavor Kfar Tavor is led by Oded Halperin, who was first elected in 2018. Both Halperin and Opposition Leader Eli Gabbay have announced their intention to run in 2023.

Kfar Tavor's council consists of nine seats presently held by three parties.

Kfar Vradim Kfar Vradim is led by Eyal Shmueli, who was first elected in 2018 via runoff. Kisra-Sumei Kisra-Sumei is led by Yasser Jdaban, who was elected unopposed in 2018. Jdaban's party, Aluhda, won all nine seats on the local council.

Kokhav Ya'ir Kokhav Ya'ir is led by Yuval Arad.

Kokhav Ya'ir's council consists of 11 seats. 7 Are held by Arad's Gal Party, and four are held by the One Coummunity Party, whose leader is Shimi Ariel, Arad's predecessor.

Kuseife Kuseife is led by Abd Al-Aziz Nasasra, who was first elected in 2018.

Lakiya Lakiya is led by Ahmad Al-Assad, who was first elected via runoff in 2018.

Lehavim Lehavim is led by Yossi Nissan, who was first elected via runoff in 2018.

Lod Lod is led by incumbent Likud member Yair Revivo, who announced in 2021 that he will seek re-election in 2023.

Lod's council consists of 19 seats, 6 are held by Likud, 6 are held by the United Arab List, 3 are held by The Jewish Home, 2 are held by Lod Beitenu, the local chapter of Yisrael Beiteinu, 1 is held by Shas, and one is held by the 'We All have a Future' list.

Ma'ale Adumim Ma'ale Adumim is led by Benny Kashriel, who became its leader in 1992. He is not running for re-election and has endorsed Guy Yifrakh for the mayoral post.

Ma'ale Adumim's council consists of 15 seats presently held by four parties.

Ma'ale Efraim Ma'ale Efrayim is led by Shomo Lalush, who was elected unopposed in 2018.

Ma'ale Iron Ma'ale Iron is led by Mahmud Jbarin, who was first elected in 2018.

Ma'ale Iron's council consists of 13 seats presently held by six parties.

Ma'alot-Tarshiha Ma'alot-Tarshiha is led by Arkady Pummerantz, who defeated previous mayor Shlomo Bohbot, who held office for 42 years, in 2018.

Maghar Maghar, previously a local council, was reclassified as a city in October 2021. Maghar is led by Farid Ghanem, who was first elected in 2018 via runoff.

Majd al-Krum Majd al-Krum is led by Salim Salibi

Majdal Shams Majdal Shams is one of four local councils in the Golan Heights who were managed, until 2018, by Israeli-appointed local residents, and who first held local elections in 2018. Most local residents boycotted the election, leading to Dulan Abu Salah and his party winning unopposed.

Mas'ade Mas'ade is one of four local councils in the Golan Heights who were managed, until 2018, by Israeli-appointed local residents, and who first held local elections in 2018. Most local residents boycotted the election, with all candidates for both the council and its leadership dropping out before the election. As a result, the Interior Ministry appointed a temporary committee to manage the council.

Mazkeret Batya Mazkeret Batya is led by Gabi Gaon, who was first elected in 2018.

Mazra'a Mazra'a is led by Fuad Awad.

Meitar Meitar is led by Shimon Mazuz, who was first elected in 2018 via runoff. Metula Metula is led by David Azulai, who became its leader in 2015.

Mevaseret Zion Mevaseret Zion is led by Yoram Shimon, who was first elected in 2013. Shimon was re-elected unopposed in 2018.

Mevaseret Zion's council consists of 15 seats presently held by six parties.

Migdal Migdal is led by Natanel Alfasi, who was first elected in 2018.

Migdal HaEmek Migdal HaEmek is led by Eli Barada, who was first elected in 1998. City Councillor Yeki Ben-Haim, who challenged Barada in 2018, and former City Councillor Hen Shaul have both announced their intention to run to replace Barada in 2023.

Mi'ilya Mi'ilya is led by Hatem Aaref.

Modi'in Illit Modi'in Illit is led by Ya'akov Asher Gutterman, a member of Degel HaTorah who became its leader in 2000.

Modi'in-Maccabim-Re'ut Modi'in-Maccabim-Re'ut is led by Haim Bibas, who was first elected in 2008. Bibas was re-elected unopposed in 2018. Maccabim-Re'ut, which acts as an autonomous Borough within Modi'in-Maccabim-Re'ut, will hold an election for its nine-member board.

Mitzpe Ramon Mitzpe Ramon is led by Roni Marom, who was first elected in 2013.

Mitzpe Ramon's council consists of nine seats presently held by six parties.

Mashhad Mashhad is led by Vajiya Saliman, who was first elected via runoff in 2018.

Nahariya Nahariya is led by Ronen Marelly, who defeated incumbent Jackie Sabag in 2018.

Nof HaGalil Nof HaGalil is led by Ronen Plot, who was first elected in a special election in 2016. Plot was re-elected unopposed in 2018.

Plot's party won 13 seats on Nof HaGalil's council, with three seats going to the list for coexistence and one going to the United Religious Front.

Nahf Nahf is led by Abd Al-Bast Kis, who was first elected via runoff in 2018.

Ness Ziona Ness Ziona is led by Shmuel Boxer, who was first elected in 2018.

Nazareth Nazareth is led by Ali Sallam, who was first elected in 2013.

Nesher Nesher is led by Roi Levi, who was first elected in 2018.

Netivot Netivot is led by Yehiel Zohar, who was first elected in 1989.

Netanya Netanya is led by Miriam Feirberg, who became its mayor in 1998.

Ofakim Ofakim is led by Itzik Danino, who was first elected in 2013.

Omer Omer is led by Pini Badash, who became its leader in 1990.

Or Akiva Or Akiva is led by Yaakov Edri, who became its leader in 2013, previously serving between 1989 and 2003. In January 2022, the State Attorney Indicted Edri on charges of accepting bribes, fraud and breach of trust, as well as violent and tax felonies. On 13 November, City Councillor Moshe Biton announced his intention to run for Mayor.

Or Yehuda Or Yehuda is led by Liat Shohat, who was first elected via special election in September 2015.

Oranit Oranit is led by Nir Bartal, who was first elected in 2018.

Sajur Sajur is led by Jaber Hamud, who was re-elected in 2018 by a 10-vote margin.

Sakhnin Sakhnin is led by Safuat Abu-Ri'ya, a member of Hadash, who was first elected in 2018, defeating incumbent Mazen Ghnaim.

Sakhnin's council consists of 15 seats presently held by 12 parties.

Savyon Savyon is led by Motti Landau, who was first elected in 2013.

Savyon's council consists of nine seats presently held by three parties.

Eilabun Eilabun is led by Samir Abu Ziyyad, who was first elected in 2018.

Ilut Ilut is led by Abrahim Abu Ras.

Ein Mahil Ein Mahil is led by Ahmed Habiballa, who was first elected in 2018.

Ein Qiniyye Ein Qiniyye is one of four local councils in the Golan Heights who were managed, until 2018, by Israeli-appointed local residents, and who first held local elections in 2018. Due to a boycott, only two candidates ran for the council's leadership. Wahil Mugrabi, who received 20 votes, and Samira Rada Amran, who only received one vote.

Acre Acre is led by Shimon Lankri, who was first elected in 2003. Lankri announced in November 2022 that he won't seek re-election in 2023.

Immanuel Immanuel is led by Eliyahu Gafni, a member of Agudat Yisrael.

Immanuel's council consists of nine seats presently held by six parties, with Gafni, whose party didn't win any seats, serving as the council's tenth member.

Isfiya Isfiya is led by Bahij Mansur, who was first elected in 2018.

Isfiya's council consists of 11 seats presently held by 11 parties.

Afula Afula is led by Avii Elkabetz, who was elected in 2018. Elkabetz was previously mayor from 2005 to 2013. Elkabetz and former mayor Yitzhak Meron have both expressed interest in seeking re-election, as have Rami Yosef, City Councillor Shlomo Melihi, and Dov Hirsch.

Arraba Arraba is led by Omar Wahad, who was first elected in 2018.

Arad Arad is led by Nissan Ben Hemo, who was first elected via special election in 2015 and was re-elected in 2018.

Ar'ara Ar'ara is led by Murder Yunis, who was first elected via runoff in 2018.

Ar'ara's council consists of 13 seats presently held by eight parties.

Ar'arat an-Naqab Ar'arat an-Naqab is led by Narif Abu Arar.

Fureidis Fureidis is led by Ayman Mari, who was first elected in 2018.

Fureidis' council consists of 11 seats presently held by seven parties. Mari's list was not elected to the council, but he serves as its twelfth member.

Fassuta Fassuta is led by Adgar Dachuar.

Peki'in Peki'in is led by Sawid Swid.

Pardes Hanna-Karkur Pardes Hanna-Karkur is led by Hagar Perry Yagur, who was first elected in 2018.

Pardes Hanna-Karkur's council consists of 15 seats presently held by eight parties.

Pardesiya Pardesiya is led by Tal Gurky, who was first elected in 2013.

Petah Tikva Petah Tikva is led by Rami Greenberg, who was first elected in 2018, defeating incumbent mayor Itzik Braverman. City Councillor Orna Davidai and former advisor to Member of the Knesset Nir Orbach Or Barak have both announced their intention to run for Mayor in 2023. Former Mayor Uri Ahad has expressed an interest in potentially running for Mayor.

Petah Tikva's council presently consists of 29 seats. 5 Are held by Greenberg's Hithadshut Party, 4 are held by Yesh Atid, 4 by Shas, 3 by Braverman's Echpat party, 3 by The Jewish Home, and three by the Bitzuistim party. Mechubarim, Excelling with Gennady, and United Torah Judaism each hold two seats, while Likud holds a single seat.

Safed Safed is led by Shuki Ohana, a member of Likud, who was first elected in 2018 via runoff.

Kedumim Kedumim is led by Hananel Dorani, who was first elected in 2007.

Kadima-Tzoran Kadima-Tzoran is led by Keren Green, who was first elected in 2018.

Qalansawe Qalansawe is led by Abd al-Bast Salama, who was first elected via runoff in 2018.

Katzrin Katzrin is led by Dimitry Afratsav, who was first elected in 2013.

Katzrin's council consists of nine seats presently held by three parties.

Kiryat Ono Kiryat Ono is led by Israel Gal, who was first elected in 2013.

Kiryat Arba Kiryat Arba is led by Eliyahu Libman, who was first elected in 2013.

Kiryat Ata Kiryat Ata is led by Ya'akov Peretz, who became its leader in 1996.

Kiryat Bialik Kiryat Bialik is led by Eli Dukorsky, who was first elected in 2008. Dukorsky was re-elected unopposed in 2018. Lawyer Maimon Pe'er has announced his intention to challenge Dukorsky in 2023.

Kiryat Gat Kiryat Gat is led by Aviram Dahari, who was first elected in 2003.

Kiryat Tiv'on Kiryat Tiv'on is led by Iddo Greenblum, who was first elected via runoff in 2018.

Kiryat Yam Kiryat Yam is led by David Even Zur, who was first elected in 2013.

Kiryat Ye'arim Kiryat Ye'arim re-elected incumbent Avraham Rosental, who died before being sworn in for a second term. Yitzhak Ravitz, a councillor from Rosental's party, was appointed as the council's acting leader, before being replaced by Yanki Flei in a 2019 special election.

Kiryat Motzkin Kiryat Motzkin is led by Haim Tzuri, who became its mayor in 1993. Tzuri will seek re-election despite being charged with Bribery and Breach of Privacy in June 2022. He will be opposed by Tziki Avisar, the leader of the local opposition.

Kiryat Malakhi Kiryat Malakhi is led by Eliyahu Zohar, a member of The Jewish Home, who was first elected in 2013.

Kiryat Malakhi's council consists of 13 seats presently held by seven parties.

Kiryat Ekron Kiryat Ekron is led by Hovev Tsabari, who was first elected in 2013.

Kiryat Shmona Kiryat Shmona is led by Avichai Stern, who was elected in 2018, defeating his predecessor is a runoff.

Karnei Shomron Karnei Shomron is led by Yigal Lahav, who was first elected in 2013.

Rameh Rameh is led by Shauki Latif.

Ra'anana Ra'anana is led by Haim Broida, who was first elected in 2018, defeating his predecessor Eitan Ginzburg in a runoff.

Ra'anana's council consists of 19 seats presently held by eight parties.

Rahat Rahat is led by Faiz Abu Sahiban, who was first elected in 2018, defeating his predecessor.

Ramla Ramla is led by Michael Videl, a member of Likud, who was first elected via special election in 2017.

Ramat Gan Ramat Gan is led by Carmel Shama, who was first elected in 2018, defeating Incumbent Mayor Yisrael Zinger in a runoff. Liad Ilani, who was a candidate in 2018 and a member of Shama's municipal coalition, left the coalition in April 2021 and announced his intention to challenge Shama in 2023.

Ramat Gan's council consists of 25 seats presently held by 13 parties.

Ramat HaSharon Ramat HaSharon is led by Aviram Grover, who became its leader in 2016. Grover was re-elected via runoff in 2018.

Ramat Yishai Ramat Yishai is led by Ofer Ben-Eliezer, who was first elected in 2008.

Ramat Yishai's council consists of nine seats presently held by five parties.

Rehovot Rehovot is led by Rahamim Malul, who became its mayor in 2009, and was re-elected unopposed in 2018. Malul has announced that he will seek re-election in 2023. He will be opposed by former Deputy Mayor Matan Dill.

Reineh Reineh is led by Jamil Bassul.

Rekhasim Rekhasim is currently led by Dan Cohen, who is in a rotation agreement with Yitzhak Reich.

Rishon LeZion Rishon LeZion is led by Raz Kinstlich, who was first elected in 2018, defeating incumbent Dov Zur.

Rosh HaAyin Rosh HaAyin is led by Shalom Ben-Moshe, who was first elected in 2013. Ben-Moshe was re-elected via runoff in 2018.

Rosh Pinna Rosh Pinna is led by Motti Hatiel, who was first elected via runoff in 2018.

Sderot Sderot is led by Alon Davidi, who was first elected in 2013.

Sha'ab Sha'ab is led by Mahmud Buqa'i, who was first elected in 2018.

Shaqib al- Salam Shaqib al-Salam is led by Amar Abu-Ma'amar.

Shaqib al-Salam's council consists of 11 seats presently held by five parties.

Shefa-Amr Shefa-Amr is led by Ursan Yassin, who was elected in 2018. Yassin previously served as mayor between 1998 and 2008.

Shibli–Umm al-Ghanam Shibli–Umm al-Ghanam is led by Munir Shibli, who was first elected in 2018.

Shlomi Shlomi is led by Gabriel Ne'eman.

Shoham Shoham is led by Eitan Petigro, who was first in 2018.

Tamra Tamra is led by Suhil Diab, who was first elected in 2013 and re-elected in 2018 via runoff.

Tayibe Tayibe held its municipal election in 2019, rather than in 2018. Shua Masrawa Mansur, who was first elected in 2011, was re-elected. He will be opposed by Abd al-Hakim Hajj Yahya.

Tayibe's council consists of 15 seats presently held by 11 parties. Mansur's party was not elected to the council, but he serves as its sixteenth representative.

Tel Aviv

Tel Aviv is led by Ron Huldai, who was first elected in 1998. Huldai was re-elected in 2018, defeating former Deputy Mayor Asaf Zamir. Huldai has announced that he will seek re-election in 2023. His challengers are Orna Barbivai, the former Minister of Economy, a retired major general in the Israel Defense Forces, and Yuval Zellner, former member of the Knesset.

Tel Sheva Tel Sheva is led by Omar Abu Rakyik, who was first elected in 2018, where he won the runoff after his opponent withdrew from the race.

Tiberias Tiberias was led by Ron Cobi, who was first elected in 2018 and was ousted as mayor on 14 January 2020 over his failure to approve a budget, due to disagreements with city council members. Cobi has announced his intention to run for Mayor, as have Lawyers Shani Ilouz, Meir Almaikes and Aviv Yitzhak.

In July 2023, the Knesset passed a law known informally as the 'Tiberias Law', to allow caretaker mayor Boaz Yosef to run as a candidate for mayor in that city. The law was criticized for benefiting Yosef, an ally of Shas Leader Aryeh Deri, since a incumbent would have an advantage, and only applies to the city of Tiberias. The law was brought to the supreme court, who interpreted it to only apply to the next election (ie elections following 2023).

Tira Tira is led by Ma'amun Abed Alhi, who was first elected in 2018.

Tira's council consists of 15 seats presently held by 11 parties.

Tirat Carmel Tirat Carmel is led by Aryeh Tal, who became its leader in 2009, previously serving between 1993 and 2003. Tal was re-elected in 2018 via runoff.

Tuba-Zangariyye Tuba-Zangariyye is led by Visam Pazi Omar, who was first elected in 2018.

Tur'an Tur'an is led Mazen Adui, who was elected in 2018, defeating his predecessor in the first round.

Umm Al-Fahm Umm al-Fahm is led by Samir Mahamed, who was first elected in 2018 via runoff.

Yanuh-Jat Yanuh-Jat is led by Muammad Sa'ad.

Yanuh-Jat's council consists of nine seats presently held by nine parties.

Yarka Yarka is led by Wahib Habish.

Yavne'el Yavne'el is led by Shanir Arish, who defeated his predecessor via runoff in 2018.

Yavne Yavne is led by Roei Gabay, who was elected Mayor via special election in November 2022 to replace his predecessor, Zvi Gov-Ari, who died in office. Gabay defeated acting mayor Haim Masing, winning 51% of the vote to Masing's 47%.

Yavne's council consists of 15 seats, 5 held by the Our Yavne party, and 10 divided between six smaller parties.

Yehud-Monosson Yehud-Monosson is led by Ya'ala Maclise, who was first elected in 2013 and re-elected via runoff in 2018. She will be challenged by City Councillor Lior Gilboa, who announced his bid for Mayor in November 2022.

Neve Monosson, which acts as an autonomous Borough within Yehud-Monosson, will hold an election for its nine-member board. the Kolenu Neve party, who currently hold all nine seats, will run for both the Borough and City councils.

Yesud HaMa'ala Yesud HaMa'ala is led by Ilan Or, who was first elected in 2013.

Yafa an-Naseriyye Yafa an-Naseriyye is led by Maher Halila, who was first elected in 2018.

Yokneam Illit Yokneam Illit is led by Simon Alfasi, who became its mayor in 1989. In June 2022, Alfasi announced that he will not seek re-election in 2023. Several candidates have announced their intention to run, including City Councillor Yaron Hen, former Member of the Knesset Leah Fadida and deputy Mayor Roman Peres.

Yokneam Illit's council consists of 13 seats presently held by seven parties.

Yeruham Yeruham is led by Tal Ohana, who was first elected in 2018, replacing Michael Biton.

Yeruham's council consists of 11 seats, 4 held by Ohana's 'One Yeruham' Party and seven held by four smaller parties.

Zarzir Zarzir is led by Amir Mzarib, who was first elected via runoff in 2018.

Zemer Zemer is led by Tamim Hazralla, who was first elected via runoff in 2018.

Zikhron Ya'akov Zikhron Ya'akov is led by Ziv Deshe, who became its leader in July 2016.

== Other authorities ==
Both Industrial Local Councils, Ne'ot Hovav and Migdal Tefen, do not hold elections as the leader of their council is appointed by law by the Interior Minister.

Sha'ar HaShomron, a local council that was established in May 2022 as a merger of Etz Efraim and Sha'arei Tikva, is currently led by Avi Roeh, who was appointed by the Interior minister for a four-year term.

The Committee of the Jewish Community of Hebron, which was established in 2017, governs approximately 1,000 Israeli citizens who live in Area H-2 of the city. The Committee held its first election in September 2022, which was won by Eyal Gelman.

Tel Mond elected in November 2020 its mayor Lin Kaplan and it's council and therefore it will hold elections on a later date than most places.

Yoav Regional Council held its election in May 2023 due to the resignation of its leader, Matti Sarfati Harkavi, after her election to the Knesset. Natti Lerner was chosen as mayor in the second round.
