= 2018 Israeli municipal elections =

Local elections in several municipalities and councils in Israel

The 2018 municipal elections in Israel were held in Israel on October 30, 2018. A run-off was held on November 13 in localities where a candidate for mayor received at least 40% of the vote.

For the first time, the four local councils in Druze localities in the Golan Heights were up for election. Elections were held in all 54 regional councils, 122 out of 124 local councils, and 75 out of 77 cities. The cities of Baqa al-Gharbiyye and Tayibe, as well as the local council of Jatt, did not hold elections, as elections were held there in 2015. In Tel Mond, a local council, a split commission is currently serving. Further, RC Rekhasim, LC Ghajar, and 3 more places only had one list be submitted for the council elections, and was automatically elected by a walkover, without any ballots cast. In all except Kfar Shmaryahu, where three candidates had been nominated, the mayoral election was also decided by walkover.

In these elections, the then-longest-serving mayors in Israel, Shlomo Bohbot of Ma'alot-Tarshiha and Ephraim Deri of Kfar Yona, who had served for nine terms consecutively, were defeated in their re-election bids.

== Voter turnout ==
The elections of 2018 were the first municipal elections in Israel where a paid day off work was enacted for the first round of voting, in hopes of increasing voter turnout. Total turnout in the first round of voting was 59.5%. By comparison, the turnout in 2013 stood at 51.8%.

== By city ==
=== Jerusalem ===
The results of the first round of voting in Jerusalem, with 254,326 voters participating of 638,065 eligible (a 39.86% turnout), are as follows. Of the 254,326 votes, 248,585 were valid.

Candidate	Party name		Votes	%
Moshe Lion	Our Jerusalem	ירושלים שלנו, Yerushalayim Shelanu	81,426	32.76%
Ofer Berkovitch	Awakening	התעוררות, Hit'orerut	73,079	29.4%
Ze'ev Elkin	Jerusalem Will Succeed	ירושלים תצליח, Yerushalayim Tatzli'ah	49,681	19.99%
Yossi Deutch	Agudat Yisrael	אגודת ישראל	42,289	17.01%
Avi Salman	I'm Jerusalem	אני ירושלים, Ani Yerushalayim	2,110	0.85%
Source: Ministry of the Interior

The results of the second round of voting in Jerusalem are as follows. The voter turnout was 35%.

Candidate	Votes	%
Moshe Lion	112,744	50.85%
Ofer Berkovitch	108,979	49.15%
Source: Ministry of the Interior – provisional data

The following parties gained seats in the city council. The parties that failed to gain seats are: I'm Jerusalem (Avi Salman), Elders and Pensioners of Jerusalem, Jerusalem on the Road to the Summit (Nehemia Assaf), Jerusalem Our Home (Ilya Liptzker), Jerusalem My City (Ramadan Dabash), Our Jerusalem (Moshe Lion), For the Neighborhoods (Avi Shalom), Me'orav Yerushalmi (Evyatar Elbaz), Pisgat Ze'ev on the Map (Ya'el Antebi), and Youth of Jerusalem (Yakir Jarasi).

Party name		Leader	Votes	Seats
Awakening	התעוררות, Hit'orerut	Ofer Berkovitch		7
Degel HaTorah	דגל התורה	Eliezer Rauchberger	40,848	6
Shas	ש"ס	Zvika Cohen	33,532	5
Agudat Yisrael	אגודת ישראל	Yossi Deutch	25,230	3
Yerushalayim Will Succeed	ירושלים תצליח, Yerushalayim Tatzli'ah	Ze'ev Elkin		2
United	מאוחדים, Meuhadim	Aryeh King		2
The Jewish Home	הבית היהודי, HaBayit HaYehudi	Hagit Moshe		2
Bnei Torah	בני תורה	Haim Epstein		1
Likud	הליכוד	Elisha Peleg		1
Havilio – Saving Jerusalem	חביליו – מצילים את ירושלים, Havilio – Metzilim et Yerushalayim	Yosi Havilio		1
Meretz	מרצ	Laura Verton		1

=== Tel Aviv ===
The results in Tel Aviv, with 203,018 voters participating of 440,205 eligible (a 46.12% turnout), are as follows. Of the 203,018 votes, 194,451 were valid.

Candidate	Party name		Votes	%
Ron Huldai (incumbent)	One Tel Aviv	תל אביב 1, Tel Aviv Ahat	91,116	46.86%
Asaf Zamir	City Majority	רוב העיר, Rov HaIr	66,403	34.15%
Assaf Harel	We Are the City	אנחנו העיר, Anahnu HaIr	23,604	12.14%
Natan Elnatan	Shas	ש"ס	13,328	6.85%
Source: Ministry of the Interior

The following parties gained seats on the city council. The parties that failed to get seats are: Unifying Tel Aviv, South of the City (Suzy Cohen Tzemah), Halo – Women of the City, The Tel Aviv List, Yair Tzabari, Local in Tel Aviv – Youth in the City (Yotam Shamir), Changing Direction (Nir Levi), Making Aliyah Together, Green City, City for All, and Vegan Tel Aviv (Omer Shalev).

Party name		Leader	Symbol	%	Seats
One Tel Aviv	תל אביב 1, Tel Aviv Ahat	Ron Huldai	תא		7
City Majority	רוב העיר, Rov Hair	Asaf Zamir	צ		6
We are the City	אנחנו העיר, Anahnu HaIr	Assaf Harel	ע		6
Meretz	מרצ	Meital Lahavi	מרצ		3
Hai Green Seculars	חי חילונים ירוקים, Hai Hilonim Yerukim	Reuven Ladiansky	חי		2
Power to the Pensioners and Senior Citizens	כח לגימלאים ואזרחים ותיקים, Ko'ah LaGimla'im; VeEzrahim Vatikim		זך		2
Believers	מאמינים, Ma'aminim	Haim Goren	גב		2
Shas	ש"ס		שס		2
Likud	הליכוד		מחל		1
Yesh Atid	יש עתיד		פה		1
Yafa List	רשימת יאפא, Reshimat Yafa		יף		1

=== Haifa ===
The results in Haifa, with 125,333 voters participating of 256,559 eligible (a 48.85% turnout), are as follows. Of the 125,333 votes, 118,271 were valid.

Candidate	Party name		Votes	%
Einat Kalisch-Rotem	Living in Haifa	חיים בחיפה, Haim BeHeifa	66,486	56.21%
Yona Yahav (incumbent)	Yona Yahav and Haifa's Youth	יונה יהב וצעירי חיפה, Yona Yahav VeTze'irei Heifa	43,907	37.12%
Avihu Han	Haifa Greens	הירוקים של חיפה, HaYerukim Shel Heifa	3,787	3.20%
Mendi Salzmann	Haifa Awakens	חיפה מתעוררת, Heifa Mit'oreret	2,585	2.19%
Israel Ya'akov Savyon	Lovers of Haifa	אוהבי חיפה, Ohavei Heifa	1,506	1.27%
Source: Ministry of the Interior

The following lists failed to gain any seats on the city council: Lovers of Haifa (Israel Ya'akov Savyon), Perspective for Haifa (Meir Levi), Balad, Haifans for Haifa, Haifa Awakens (Mendi Salzmann), Haifana, Kulanu (Elad Attias), Heart of the Neighborhoods (Tali Meshulam–Itach), Lechaim (Alex Abramov), Local in the Neighborhood (Boaz Gur), Disabled and Winning (Gil Goldreich), Strength, Voice of the People, and Rami Levi Biki Morad.

For the lists that entered the city council, the results are as follows:

Party name		Leader	Votes	%	Seats
Living in Haifa	חיים בחיפה, Hayim BeHeifa	Einat Kalisch-Rotem	14,091	11.54%	4
Yona Yahav and Haifa's Youth	יונה יהב וצעירי חיפה, Yona Yahav VeTze'irei Heifa	Yona Yahav	12,279	10.05%	4
Haifa Greens	הירוקים של חיפה, HaYerukim Shel Heifa	Avihu Han	11,289	9.24%	4
Haifa is Being Renewed	חיפה מיתחדשת, Heifa Mithadeshet	David Etzioni	9,548	7.82%	3
Likud	הליכוד	Shimshon Ido	8,177	6.69%	3
The Haifa Front	החזית החיפאית, HaHazit HaHeifa'it	Raja Za'atara	6,715	5.5%	2
Haifa Our Home	חיפה ביתנו, Heifa Beitenu	Lazar Kaplun	5,625	4.6%	2
Pensions' Lobby	שדולת הגמלאים, Shdulat HaGimla'im		4,929	4.03%	1
Flag to the Resident	דגל לתושב, Degel LaToshav	Michael Alper	4,843	3.96%	2
Meretz	מרצ	Dubi Hayun	4,605	3.77%	1
United Agudat Israel	אגודת ישראל המאוחדת, Agudat Yisra'el HaMe'uhedet		3,971	3.25%	1
The Jewish Home	הבית היהודי, HaBayit HaYehudi	Yoav Ramati	3,601	2.95%	1
I Care About the Residents of Haifa	אכפת לי מתושבי חיפה, Ikhpat Li MiToshvei Heifa	Zvi Barabi	3,121	2.55%	1
Haifa for Us	חיפה בשבילנו	Sarit Golan	3,055	2.5%	1
Shas	ש"ס		3,035	2.48%	1
Source: Haifa municipality

=== Rishon LeZion ===
The results in Rishon LeZion, with 108,068 voters participating of 209,511 eligible (a 51.58% turnout), are as follows. Of the 108,068 votes, 104,095 were valid. A second round was held in the mayoral election.

Candidate	Party name		Votes	%
Dov Tzur (incumbent)	Only Rishon	רק ראשון, Rak Rishon	33,194	31.89%
Raz Kinstlich	The Greens and the Youth	הירוקים והצעירים	22,663	21.77%
Liel Even-Zohar Ben David	A New Way	דרך חדשה, Derekh Hadasha	20,128	19.34%
Doron Uzan	Youth and the Environment	הצעירים והסביבה, HaTze'irim VeHaSviva	15,977	15.35%
Mordechai Ajami	One Rishon	ראשון אחת. Rishon Ahat	7,298	7.01%
Assaf Da'abul	Gold	פז, Paz	4,835	4.64%
Source: Ministry of the Interior

The results of the second round of voting in Rishon LeZion are as follows. The voter turnout was 34.2%.

Candidate	Votes	%
Raz Kinstlich	37,525	52.63%
Dov Tzur	33,768	47.37%
Source: Ministry of the Interior – provisional data

The following lists failed to gain any seats on the city council: Unity, Achievements (Meir Akiva), Our Rights and Social Justice (Vlad Kapustin), Trabelsi Hai Shimon, The Crocheted and Social (Ohad Uzan), Social Action (Kobi Dahan), Social Justice (Adamso Alali), and Rishon LeZion Together (Roei Yagna). For lists that gained seats, the results are as follows.

Party name		Leader	Votes	%	Seats
Only Rishon	רק ראשון, Rak Rishon	Dov Tzur			4
The Greens and the Youth	הירוקים והצעירים, HaYerukim VeHaTze'irim	Raz Kinstlich			4
A New Way	דרך חדשה, Derekh Hadasha	Liel Even-Zohar Ben David			4
Youth and the Environment	הצעירים והסביבה, HaTze'irim VeHaSviva	Doron Uzan			3
Green Social Movement	התנועה החברתית הירוקה, HaTnu'a HaHevratit HaYeruka				3
Yesh Atid	יש עתיד	Itai Matityahu			2
Likud	הליכוד	Yossi Hamami			2
Shas	ש"ס				1
Believers	מאמינים, Ma'aminim	Shmuel Jamil			1
Meretz – Free Rishon LeZion	מרצ – ראשון לציון חופשית, Meretz – Rishon LeZion Hofshit				1
Gold	פז, Paz	Assaf Da'abul			1
One Rishon	ראשון אחת, Rishon Ahat	Mordechai Ajami			1
Rishon Our Home	ראשון ביתנו, Rishon Beitenu				1
Pioneers	ראשונים, Rishonim	Maxim Babitzky			1

=== Petah Tikva ===
The results in Petah Tikva, with 108,563 voters participating of 193,736 eligible (a 56.04% turnout), are as follows. Of the 108,563 votes, 104,671 were valid.

Candidate	Party name		Votes	%
Rami Greenberg	Renewal	התחדשות, Hithadshut	46,763	44.68%
Itzik Braverman (incumbent)	Care	אכפ"ת, Ikhpat	37,876	36.19%
Itay Shonshein	Connected	מחוברים, Connected	11,421	10.9%
Gennady Borschevsky	Excelling with Gennady	מצטיינים עם גנאדי, Mitztaynim Im Genadi	7,489	7.15%
Ori Darshan HaCohen			1,122	1.07%
Source: Ministry of the Interior

The following lists did not gain enough seats to enter the city council: One of Ours, With Us (Haim Bashari), Us, Together, The Present, Petah Tikva Our Home, and Young Leadership for Real. Of the lists that entered the city council, the results are as follows.

Party name		Leader	Votes	%	Seats
Renewal	התחדשות, Hithadshut	Rami Greenberg	6,244		5
Yesh Atid	יש עתיד	Ron Katz	6,185		4
Shas	ש"ס	Uriel Buso	5,132		4
The Jewish Home	הבית היהודי, HaBayit HaYehudi	Itzik Di'i	4,872		3
Care	אכפ"ת, Ikhpat	Itzik Braverman	4,218		3
The Achievers	הביצועיסטים, HaBitzu'istim	Uri Ohad	3,859		3
Connected	מחוברים, Mehubarim	Itay Shonshein	3,215		2
United Torah Judaism	יהדות התורה, Yahadut HaTorah	Eliyahu Barukhi	3,106		2
Excelling with Gennady	מצטיינים עם גנאדי, Mitztaynim Im Genadi	Gennady Borschevsky	2,082		2
Likud	הליכוד	Moshe Moshe	1,599		1
Source: Ministry of the Interior

=== Ashdod ===
The results in Ashdod, with 121,245 voters participating of 182,983 eligible (a 66.26% turnout), are as follows. Of the 121,245 votes, 118,363 were valid.

Candidate	Party name		Votes	%
Yehiel Lasri (incumbent)			48,746	41.18%
Shimon Katzenelson	Ashdod Together	אשדוד ביחד, Ashdod BeYahad	29,861	25.23%
Eli Elias Lahmani			28,704	24.25%
Helen Gelber	Ashdod Commando	קומנדו אשדוד, Komando Ashdod	8,565	7.24%
Boris Gitterman			2,487	2.1
Source: Ministry of the Interior

The following lists did not gain enough seats to enter the city council: A New Voice, Ashdod United, Ashdod Awakens (Naor Biton), There is an Alternative, Ashdod Community, Voice of the Heart, and Integration. Of the lists that entered the city council, the results are as follows.

Party name		Leader	Votes	%	Seats
Shas	ש"ס	Avi Amsalem	3,473		6
Ashdod Together	אשדוד ביחד, Ashdod BeYahad	Shimon Katzenelson	3,446		6
United Torah Judaism	יהדות התורה, Yahadut HaTorah		1,823		4
Ashdod Will Win	אשדוד תנצח, Ashdod Tenatze'ah		1,787		3
Ashdod in the Momentum	אשדוד בתנופה, Ashdod BiTnufa		1,519		2
Ashdod's Future	עתיד אשדוד, Atid Ashdod		1,415		2
Ashdodis' Movement	תנועת אשדודים, Tnu'at Ashdodim		1,364		2
The Lionesses	הלביאות, HaLevi'ot		1,239		2
Ashdod Commando	קומנדו אשדוד, Komando Ashdod		837		1
A New Way	דרך חדשה, Derekh Hadasha	Moshe Buterashvili	759		1
Source: Ministry of the Interior

=== Netanya ===
The results in Netanya, with 89,371 voters participating of 186,792 eligible (a 47.85% turnout), are as follows. Of the 89,371 votes, 83,258 were valid.

Candidate	Party name		Votes	%
Miriam Feirberg (incumbent)	One Netanya	נתניה אחת, Netanya Ahat	40,364	48.48%
Yonatan Chetboun	After Me	אחריי, Aharai	22,235	26.71%
Ofer Orenstein	For Netanya	למען נתניה, LeMa'an Netanya	9,246	11.11%
Ephraim Eliezer Bulmash	Netanya is Truly Free (Labor)	נתניה חופשית באמת, Netanya Hofshit Be'emet	6,472	7.77%
Herzl Keren	Power to Netanya	עוצמה לנתניה, Otzma LiNetanya	4,941	5.93
Source: Ministry of the Interior

The following lists did not gain enough seats to enter the city council: The Way (Wagif Eliav), The New Ones (Amir Sinai), Local in Netanya (Daniel Maharat), Our Netanya (Yoni Giorno), Netanyans and Youth (Tzvika Lieber), and Hope (Amos Dirsau). Of the lists that entered the city council, the results are as follows.

Party name		Leader	Votes	%	Seats
One Netanya	נתניה אחת, Netanya Ahat	Miriam Feirberg	6,381		6
Shas	ש"ס	Hagai Hadad	3,537		3
After Me	אחריי, Aharai	Yonatan Chetboun	3,125		3
Netanya Our Home	נתניה ביתנו, Netanya Beitenu	Gersh Fishman	2,383		2
For Netanya	למען נתניה, LeMa'an Netanya	Ofer Orenstein	2,167		2
Netanya is Truly Free (Labor)	נתניה חופשית באמת, Netanya Hofshit Be'emet	Ephraim Eliezer Bulmash	1,577		2
A New Beat	פעימה חדשה, Pe'ima Hadasha	Tali Mulner	1,564		2
We Are All With Orgad	כולנו עם אורגד, Kulanu Im Orgad	Aharon Orgad	1,438		1
Power to Netanya	עוצמה לנתניה, Otzma LiNetanya	Herzl Keren	1,431		1
For Advancing Education, Health, and Welfare	לקידום חינוך, בריאות ורווחה, LeKidum Hinukh, Bri'ut URvaha	Shimon Sher	1,391		2
Likud	הליכוד	Alon Elro'i	1,316		1
The Jewish Home	הבית היהודי, HaBayit HaYehudi	Daniel Bashari	1,001		1
Arc	קשת, Keshet	Akiva Yitzhaki	962		1
Source: Ministry of the Interior

=== Beersheba ===
The results in Beersheba, with 83,436 voters participating of 166,800 eligible (a 50.02% turnout), are as follows. Of the 83,436 votes, 78,161 were valid.

Candidate	Party name		Votes	%
Ruvik Danilovich (incumbent)	A New Way	דרך חדשה, Derekh Hadasha	72,016	92.14%
Moshe Yanai	Light	אור, Or	4,670	5.97%
Ephraim Feinblum			1,475	1.89%
Source: Ministry of the Interior

The following lists did not gain enough seats to enter the city council: Be'er Sheva We Deserve More, Pleasant Ways, Strength in Unity, Light (Moshe Yanai), and Voice of Be'er Sheva (Yitzhak Dahan). Of the lists that entered the city council, the results are as follows.

Party name		Leader	Votes	%	Seats
New Way	דרך חדשה, Derekh Hadasha	Ruvik Danilovich	45,311		16
Shas	ש"ס	Ofer Karadi	6,369		2
The Jewish Home	הבית היהודי, HaBayit HaYehudi	Gadi Mazuz	6,162		2
Gesher	גשר	Shimon Tubul	5,676		2
Likud	הליכוד	Shimon Boker	4,464		2
Community	קהילה, Kehila	Yasmin Sachs-Fridman	3,827		1
Be'er Sheva Our Home	באר שבע ביתנו, Be'er Sheva Beitenu	Tali Mulner	3,052		1
Source: Mynet

== Results ==
=== Cities ===
Municipality	Mayoral election				Council election			
Municipality	Candidate	Party	Votes	%	Party	Votes	%	Seats
Acre	Shimon Lankri (incumbent)	Likud	17,830	85.0				
Afula	Avi Elkabetz		10,669	48.6				
Afula	Yitzhak Meron (incumbent)	Independent	9,966	45.4				
Afula	Eli Vaknin		1,321	6.0				
Arad	Nissan Ben Hemo (incumbent)	Yesh Atid	4,675	67.0				
Arad	Moshe Edri		2,057	29.5				
Arad	Oron Kliman		241	3.5				
Arraba	Omar Wakad		6,193	45.4				
Arraba	Ahmed Nasser		4,797	35.2				
Arraba	Idal Isla		1,805	13.2				
Arraba	Munib Badarna		844	6.2				
Ashkelon	Tomer Glam	Kulanu	17,013	40.5				
Ashkelon	Itamar Shimoni (incumbent)	Ashkelon BeTenofa	16,741	39.9				
Ashkelon	Itay Bechor Sohar		3,051	7.3				
Ashkelon	Moshe Atias		2,626	6.3				
Ashkelon	Avi Aish		2,544	6.1				
Bat Yam	Tzvika Brot	Likud						
Bat Yam	Yossi Bachar (incumbent)							
Beit She'an	Jackie Levy	Likud	6,649	62.5				
Beit She'an	Rafi Ben Shitrit (incumbent)	Kulanu	3,997	37.5				
Beit Shemesh	Aliza Bloch	Gimmel (UTJ)						
Beit Shemesh	Moshe Abutbul (incumbent)	Ir Meuchedet						
Beit Shemesh	Malachi Kitov	Peleg Yerushalmi		1				
Bnei Brak	Avraham Rubenstein	Joint Torah List	10,630	82.9	United Torah Judaism			16
Bnei Brak	Nir Ariel		1,187	9.3	Shas			7
Bnei Brak	Avraham Kahan		1,001	7.8	Etz			2
Bnei Brak					Likud			2
Bnei Brak					Yachad			1
Dimona	Benny Biton (incumbent)	Likud	6,035	50.8				
Dimona	Nisim Peretz	Labor	5,452	45.9				
Dimona	Jackie Edri		391	3.3				
Eilat	Meir Yitzhak Halevi (incumbent)	Kadima						
Eilat	Dubi Cohen							
Giv'at Shmuel	Yossi Brodny (incumbent)	Likud	6,652	59.7				
Giv'at Shmuel	Ronit Lev		3,170	28.4				
Giv'at Shmuel	Gal Lanzner		1,053	9.4				
Giv'at Shmuel	Naomi Feldman		271	2.4				
Givatayim	Ran Kunik (incumbent)	Givatayim Shelanu	9,468	85.5				
Hadera	Zvika Gendelman (incumbent)	Yesh Atid	16,504	40.7				
Hadera	Gad Arieli		8,605	21.5				
Hadera	Yaniv Deri		7,363	18.4				
Hadera	Ehud Merhav		5,375	13.4				
Hadera	Shirley Oded Rodan		1,196	3.0				
Hadera	Yitzhak Tzur		930	2.3				
Herzliya	Moshe Fadlon (incumbent)	Vision and Experience	20,789	50.6				
Herzliya	Maya Katz		14,645	35.6				
Herzliya	Eyal Fabian		3,374	8.2				
Herzliya	Michel Ovadia		2,315	5.6				
Hod HaSharon	Amir Kochavi							
Hod HaSharon	Yifat Kariv							
Holon	Moti Sasson (incumbent)	Labor	21,947	41.3				
Holon	Shai Kinan		20,791	29.5				
Holon	Morris Moran Israel		9,217	13.1				
Holon	Michael Mordechai Bozglo		6,770	9.6				
Holon	Keren Gonen		2,838	4.0				
Holon	Ilan Gazit		1,755	2.5				
Kafr Qasem	Aydal Badir (incumbent)		659	54.2				
Kafr Qasem	Ashraf Issa		556	45.8				
Karmiel	Moshe Koninsky	Kulanu	9,399	43.1				
Karmiel	Rotem Yanai		5,339	24.5				
Karmiel	Rina Greenberg		4,469	20.5				
Karmiel	Giora Chashkin		1,322	6.1				
Karmiel	Rotem Bazerno		1,276	5.9				
Kfar Saba	Rafi Sa'ar							
Kfar Saba	Yossi Sedbon							
Kfar Yona	Shoshi Kahlon Kidor		3,633	49.8	There Is a New Day	2,855	37.0	
Kfar Yona	Ephraim Deri (incumbent)		2,717	37.3	One Kfar Yona	1,367	17.7	
Kfar Yona	Albert Tayav		943	12.9	Ahdut Yisrael	778	10.1	
Kfar Yona					Shas	699	9.1	
Kfar Yona					Choosing Education	694	9.0	
Kfar Yona					For the Village	667	8.6	
Kfar Yona					Likud	495	6.4	
Kiryat Ata	Ya'akov Peretz (incumbent)	Likud	4,258	80.6				
Kiryat Ata	Adana Shternik		1,025	19.4				
Kiryat Bialik	Eli Dokorski (incumbent)		2,005	94.5				
Kiryat Gat	Aviram Dahari (incumbent)		12,096	50.9				
Kiryat Gat	Ya'akov Schindler		7,106	29.9				
Kiryat Gat	Shai Zoldan		3,541	14.9				
Kiryat Gat	Ilan Hazan		1,002	4.2				
Kiryat Malakhi	Eliyahu Zohar (incumbent)	The Jewish Home	6,911	62.1				
Kiryat Malakhi	Haim Weizmann		4,211	37.9				
Kiryat Motzkin	Haim Tzuri (incumbent)	Kadima	11,368	59.2				
Kiryat Motzkin	Zvi Avishar		6,453	33.6				
Kiryat Motzkin	Avi Rotman		1,379	7.2				
Kiryat Ono	Israel Gal (incumbent)		6,401	54.8				
Kiryat Ono	Gil Natan Michals		2,327	19.9				
Kiryat Ono	Liat Arbel		2,315	19.8				
Kiryat Ono	Shai Devora		629	5.4				
Kiryat Shmona	Avichai Stern							
Kiryat Shmona	Nissim Malka							
Kiryat Yam	David Even Tzur (incumbent)	Likud	6,653	81.9				
Kiryat Yam	Shlomi Tal		1,467	18.1				
Lod	Yair Revivo (incumbent)	Likud	7,433	72.2				
Lod	Moshe Bunafil		1,685	16.4				
Lod	Fahridin Sarayaa		1,176	11.4				
Ma'alot-Tarshiha	Arkady Pomerantz			33				
Ma'alot-Tarshiha	Shlomo Bohbot (incumbent)	Labor		30				
Migdal HaEmek	Eli Barda (incumbent)	Likud	7,632	57.0				
Migdal HaEmek	Ya'akov Ben Haim		5,738	42.9				
Modi'in-Maccabim-Re'ut	Haim Bibas (incumbent)	Haim Beh Modiin (Likud)	30,784	90.4				
Nahariya	Ronen Marley	Labor	18,619	58.9				
Nahariya	Jackie Sebag (incumbent)	Kadima	7,128	22.6				
Nahariya	Oren Sodai		5,861	18.5				
Nazareth	Ali Salam (incumbent)		6,632	63.6				
Nazareth	Walid Afifi		3,799	36.4				
Nazareth Illit	Ronen Plot		8,115	98.7				
Nesher	Rot Levy		6,660	64.2				
Nesher	Yehiel Edri		1,585	15.3				
Nesher	Shlomi Zeno		1,260	12.1				
Nesher	Avi Binamo (incumbent)		872	8.4				
Ness Ziona	Shmuel Boxer		11,659	59.4				
Ness Ziona	Shachar Rubin		7.961	40.6				
Netivot	Yehiel Zohar (incumbent)	Likud	8,281	63.1				
Netivot	Moshe Peretz		4,846	36.9				
Ofakim	Itzik Danino (incumbent)	Likud	11,388	82.0	Mahal (Itzik Danino)	4,983	35.6	
Ofakim	Gideon Sebagi		2,505	18.0	Ofakim Torah Community	2,562	18.3	
Ofakim					Shas	2,434	17.4	
Ofakim					Tenufa L'Ofakim	1,463	10.4	
Ofakim					Ofakimim (Tal Megira)	1,234	8.8	
Ofakim					New Ofakim	665	4.7	
Ofakim					Jewish Home	662	4.7	
Or Akiva	Yaakov Edri (incumbent)		3,848	41.1				
Or Akiva	Simcha Yosifov		3,775	40.3				
Or Akiva	Arkady Gedilov		1,138	12.2				
Or Akiva	Noah Shemilov		597	4.6				
Or Yehuda	Liat Shohat (incumbent)		3,464	54.9				
Or Yehuda	Uzi Aharon		2,106	34.1				
Or Yehuda	Efraim Zvi Afi Gutman		339	5.5				
Or Yehuda	Nena Chen		264	4.3				
Qalansawe	Ahmed Qashqush							
Qalansawe	Abd al-Bast Salame (incumbent)							
Ra'anana	Eitan Ginzburg							
Ra'anana	Chaim Broyde							
Rahat	Faiz Abu Sahban		4,210	47.5				
Rahat	Faisal Alhazeil		2,604	29.4				
Rahat	Talal Alkernawi (incumbent)	Kadima	1,692	19.1				
Rahat	Magd Abu Balal		323	3.6				
Rahat	Sufyan al Qrenawi		31	0.3				
Ramat Gan	Carmel Shama HaCohen	Ramat Gan 1	25,836	55.8	Our Ramat Gan	6,884	11.3	3
Ramat Gan	Yisrael Zinger (incumbent)	Zinger For Ramat-Gan	20,477	44.2	Ramat Gan 1	6,505	10.6	3
Ramat Gan					Zinger For Ramat Gan	6,083	9.9	3
Ramat Gan					The RamatGanis with Avihu	5,134	8.4	2
Ramat Gan					Yesh Atid	4,815	7.9	2
Ramat Gan					Likud	4,399	7.2	2
Ramat Gan					Meretz	4,338	7.1	2
Ramat Gan					The Youth List	4,295	7.0	2
Ramat Gan					United Religious Faction	3,169	5.2	2
Ramat Gan					Ramat Gan Ahead	3,064	5.0	1
Ramat Gan					Young Ramat Gan	2,791	4.6	1
Ramat Gan					Power for Senior Citizens	1,957	3.2	1
Ramat Gan					Green Momentum	1,940	3.2	1
Ramat HaSharon	Avi Gruber (incumbent)	The Greens	7,862	40.7				
Ramat HaSharon	Ron Belkin		5,938	30.8				
Ramat HaSharon	Rami Bar-Lev		4,174	21.6				
Ramat HaSharon	Ilan Cohen		1,001	5.2				
Ramat HaSharon	Tal Azged		320	1.7				
Ramla	Michael Vidal (incumbent)	Likud	5,256	62.0				
Ramla	Adi Tzur Sternberg		3,225	38.0				
Rehovot	Rahamim Malul (incumbent)	Likud	18,635	63.4				
Rosh HaAyin	Shalom Ben Moshe (incumbent)							
Rosh HaAyin	Raz Sagi							
Safed	Shuki Ohana							
Safed	Nachman Gelbach							
Sakhnin	Safuat Abu Riya		10,118	53.3				
Sakhnin	Mazen Ghnaim (incumbent)	Balad	8,858	46.7				
Sderot	Alon Davidi (incumbent)	Jewish Home	8,529	65.8				
Sderot	Amir Pinto		4,431	34.2				
Shefaram	Ursan Yassin		1,849	40.1				
Shefaram	Nahad Hazem		1,729	37.5				
Shefaram	Amin Anbatawi (incumbent)		910	19.7				
Shefaram	Yahya Safuri		123	2.7				
Tamra	Suheil Diyab (incumbent)							
Tamra	Musa Abu Rumi							
Tiberias	Ron Cobi		9,658	45.0				
Tiberias	Yossi Ben-David (incumbent)		5,275	24.6				
Tiberias	Dudik Azoulay		5,242	24.4				
Tiberias	Zion Finian		1,069	5.0				
Tiberias	Yaniv Cohen		209	1.0				
Tira	Mamon Abd al-Hi (incumbent)		5,522	53.5				
Tira	Muhammad Sultan		4,707	45.6				
Tira	Omar Sultan		96	0.1				
Tirat Carmel	Aryeh Tal (incumbent)							
Tirat Carmel	Kafir Ovadia							
Umm al-Fahm	Khaled Aghbariyya (incumbent)							
Umm al-Fahm	Samir Mahamid							
Yavne	Zvi Guv-Ari (incumbent)	Our Yavne	9,318	57.3				
Yavne	Meir Shitrit	Mekomi Yavne	3,389	20.8				
Yavne	Roy Gabbay		2,181	13.4				
Yavne	Meir Ben Harush		1,376	8.5				
Yehud-Monosson	Yaela Maklis (incumbent)							
Yehud-Monosson	Yosef Ben David							
Yokneam Illit	Simon Alfasi (incumbent)	Labor	6,613	73.0				
Yokneam Illit	Ronen David Shapira		2,441	27.0				

=== Local councils ===
Municipality	Mayoral election				Council election			
Municipality	Candidate	Party	Votes	%	Party	Votes	%	Seats
Abu Ghosh	Salim Jaber (incumbent)	Development and Equality	1051	40.0	Justice and Equality	815	33.0	
Abu Ghosh	Kazem Ibrahim		1044	39.7	United Abu Ghosh	749	30.3	
Abu Ghosh					Openness and Equality	552	22.3	
Abu Ghosh					Justice and Progress	257	10.4	
Abu Ghosh					Reform and Progress	99	4.0	
Abu Snan	Fawzi Mashleb							
Abu Snan	Nohad Mashleb (incumbent)	Advanced List						
Ar'ara	Mudar Yunes		3,250	31.3				
Ar'ara	Uni Marzuk		1,877	18.1				
Arara BaNegev	Naif Abu Arar		1,071	58.8				
Arara BaNegev	Namer Abu Arar		751	41.2				
Azor	Aryeh Pikter (incumbent)	One Azor	1,572	68.8				
Azor	Mazal Shaul		714	31.2				
Basma	Ra'id Kabha		2,102	56.4				
Basma	Jamal Agbaria		559	15.0				
Basma	Muhammad Kabha		492	13.2				
Basma	Mustafa Badran		371	10.0				
Basma	Lait Kabha		201	5.4				
Basmat Tab'un	Muneir Zebidat							
Basmat Tab'un	Raid Zubeidat							
Be'er Ya'akov	Nissim Gozlan (incumbent)	Be'er Ya'akov BeTenofa	5,158	48.6				
Be'er Ya'akov	Moti Franco		4,196	39.6				
Be'er Ya'akov	Noam Sasson		1,254	11.8				
Beit Aryeh	Yehuda Eliyahu Elboim		1,581	56.6				
Beit Aryeh	Avi Naim (incumbent)	Beit Aryeh Ofarim	1,213	43.4				
Beit Dagan	Eliyahu Dadon (incumbent)	Likud	2,131	55.3				
Beit Dagan	Rehamim Tanami		1,647	42.7				
Beit Dagan	Alfonso Avner Araviv		77	2.0				
Beit Jann	Radi Nagam							
Beit Jann	Nazia Dabur							
Binyamina-Giv'at Ada	Itay Weisberg		2,054	44.7				
Binyamina-Giv'at Ada	Mordechai Kirmayer		1,970	42.9				
Binyamina-Giv'at Ada	Baruch Oren		568	12.4				
Bir al-Maksur	Mohammed Ghadir (incumbent)							
Bnei Aish	Aryeh Garla		2,183	79.0				
Bnei Aish	Baruch Avraham		582	21.0				
Bu'eine Nujeidat	Monir Hamoda		3,108	52.3				
Bu'eine Nujeidat	Khaled Suleiman		2,187	36.8				
Bu'eine Nujeidat	Fata Dalasha		525	8.8				
Bu'eine Nujeidat	Issa Fuqra		125	2.1				
Buq'ata								
Daliat el-Carmel	Rafiq Halabi		2,491	57.1				
Daliat el-Carmel	Perah Halabi		1,743	39.9				
Daliat el-Carmel	Marzuq Qador		129	3.0				
Daburiyya	Zuheir Yusefia		2,735	43.6				
Daburiyya	Rifat Azazia		2,399	38.3				
Daburiyya	Jaudat Masalha		890	14.2				
Daburiyya	Majd Masalha		246	3.9				
Deir al-Assad	Ahmed Dabah							
Deir al-Assad	Hussein Hatib							
Deir Hana	Kasem Salam		3,422	50.5				
Deir Hana	Samir Hussein(incumbent)		3,356	49.5				
Ein Mahil	Ahmed Habiballa		1,741	54.5				
Ein Mahil	Nuaf Abu Lil		1,456	45.5				
Ein Qiniyye	Wail Mograbi		20	95.2				
Ein Qiniyye	Samira Imran		1	4.8				
Eilabun	Samir Abu Zayed		379	61.5				
Eilabun	Jiris Metar		237	38.5				
Elyakhin	Azori Sharoni		1,434	72.9	Yachad LeDerech Hadasha	909	45.2	
Elyakhin	Moshe Mordechai Hai		533	27.1	HaYehudei BeReshut Avinoam Metzova	490	24.4	
Elyakhin					Shas	311	15.5	
Elyakhin					Our Future in Our Hands	300	14.9	
Even Yehuda	Avraham Harari (incumbent)		4953	94.4				
Fassuta	Edgar Dakoar		1,601	75.3				
Fassuta	Victor Eshkar		511	24.0				
Fassuta	Jiris Jiris		14	0.7				
Fureidis	Iman Marai		2,756	51.5				
Fureidis	Ahmed Baria		2,593	48.5				
Gan Yavne	Aharon Dror (incumbent)		4,428	56.3	Dror LeGan Yavne	2,911	40.5	
Gan Yavne	Mordechai Yosef		2,180	27.7	Derech Hadasha LeGan Yavne	1,235	17.1	
Gan Yavne	Haim Shohami		1,263	16.0	Gan Yavne Moshava Kivun	1,106	15.4	
Gan Yavne					Likud	993	13.8	
Gan Yavne					Otzma LaMoatza	939	13.1	
Ganei Tikva	Lizzie Dalharitzia		5,600	64.1	Et BeReshut Lizzie Dalharitzia	3,812	42.7	
Ganei Tikva	Yaniv Shahar		3,130	35.9	Maminim BeAhdut	2,192	24.6	
Ganei Tikva					Koah LeShanot	2,106	23.6	
Ganei Tikva					Mei BeReshut Michael Levin	716	8.0	
Gedera	Yoel Gamliel (incumbent)		6,278	49.5				
Gedera	Sahar Pinto		4,929	38.9				
Gedera	Sahar Moshe Revah		1,479	11.7				
Ghajar								
Harish	Yitzhak Keshet		1,404	60.9				
Harish	Arik Moyal		647	28.0				
Harish	Gabriel Kadosh		256	11.1				
Hatzor HaGlilit	Shimon Swisa (incumbent)		2,747	52.4				
Hatzor HaGlilit	Shaul Kamisa Raz		2,498	47.6				
Hura	Habas Alatuna		3,545	55.7				
Hura	Ali Abu Al Qinaen		2,815	44.3				
Hurfeish	Rafiq Marai		2,135	53.3				
Hurfeish	Salah Fares		1,870	46.7				
I'billin	Mamun Shiah		3,022	42.0				
I'billin	Sharif Hidar		2,097	29.1				
I'billin	Ilyas Faruni		2,084	28.9				
Iksal	Muhammad Shalabi		2,812	56.3				
Iksal	Abed Alsalam Drausha		2,177	43.6				
Jadeidi-Makr	Wissam Arid							
Jadeidi-Makr	Suheil Malham							
Ilut	Ibrahim Abu Ras							
Ilut	Hassan Ali							
Isfiya	Bahig Mansur		3,297	43.6				
Isfiya	Kamal Malek		2,342	30.9				
Isfiya	Wagia Kayuf		1,931	25.5				
Jaljulia	Darwish Rabi		669	52.1				
Jaljulia	Faiq Odeh		547	42.6				
Jaljulia	Abdul Hadi Kharuv		69	5.4				
Jish	Ilyas Ilyas							
Jish	Alam Alam							
Jisr az-Zarqa	Murad Amash		388	65.0				
Jisr az-Zarqa	Az-Al-Din Amash		193	32.3				
Jisr az-Zarqa	Sami Jarban		16	2.7				
Julis	Wassam Nabuadi							
Julis	Kasem Hanno							
Kabul	Salah Ryan (incumbent)							
Kabul	Assad Murashd							
Kadima-Tzoran	Yitzhak Golbari				Otzma LeKadima-Tzoran	3,488	33.4	4
Kadima-Tzoran	Keren Green				Kadima Tzoran BeReshut Yitzhak Golbari	3,009	28.8	4
Kadima-Tzoran					Kulanu	1,508	14.4	2
Kadima-Tzoran					Shas	1,136	10.9	1
Kadima-Tzoran					Derech Hadasha	879	8.4	1
Kadima-Tzoran					Choosing Education	435	4.2	1
Kafr Bara	Mahmoud Issi	1,173	53.0					
Kafr Bara	Tareq Ryan	1,040	47.0					
Kfar Kama	Zacharia Nabsu		1,341	48.6				
Kfar Kama	Ismail Lavi		808	29.3				
Kafr Kanna	Iyaz Amara							
Kafr Kanna	Vasil Taha							
Kafr Manda	Muannis Abd al-Halim		5,846	50.1				
Kafr Manda	Eli Zidan		5,822	49.9				
Kafr Qara	Hassan Itamana							
Kafr Qara	Fares Badahi							
Kaukab Abu al-Hija	Zaher Salah		1,496	65.9				
Kaukab Abu al-Hija	Ziad Abu al-Hija		775	34.1				
Kfar Shmaryahu	Serj Isidor Kurshia		570	53.5	Walkover			
Kfar Shmaryahu	Anik Zablik		286	26.9	Walkover			
Kfar Shmaryahu	Amira Baruch		209	19.6	Walkover			
Kfar Tavor	Oded Halperin		1,141	47.6	Atid Mesahe BeReshut Oded Halperin	1,006	41.9	
Kfar Tavor	Shaked Goldman		774	32.3	Im Nishma BeReshut Shaked Goldman	770	32.1	
Kfar Tavor	Eliyahu Gabbay		443	18.1	One Village	359	15.0	
Kfar Tavor	Hana Levi Atli		50	2.1	LeMa'an HaKehila	169	7.0	
Kfar Vradim	Ofer Cohen							
Kfar Vradim	David Shmueli							
Kiryat Tivon	Rut Ekron							
Kiryat Tivon	Ido Greenblum							
Kisra-Sumei	Yasser Jedban		2,248	98.0				
Kokhav Ya'akov (see also results for Tel Tzion)	Amichai Ya'akov Chein	Amichai Chein ("חן")						
Kokhav Ya'akov (see also results for Tel Tzion)	Ya'akov Muati	Emunah Uvitachon ("שי")						
Kokhav Ya'akov (see also results for Tel Tzion)	Roni Chori	Kokhav Ya'akov Barosh ("כי")						
Kokhav Ya'akov (see also results for Tel Tzion)	Eli Bar On	Lma'an Achai ("ת")						
Kokhav Ya'akov (see also results for Tel Tzion)	David Moshe Azulai	Lev Echad ("לב")						
Kokhav Yair	Yuval Arad		2,984	60.1				
Kokhav Yair	Shimi Eliel		1,980	39.9				
Kuseife	Abd-al-Aziz Nasasra		1,568	65.4				
Kuseife	Salam Abu Rabia		829	34.6				
Lehavim	Yosef Nissan							
Lehavim	Kafir Maimon							
Lakiya	Ahmed al-Assad							
Lakiya	Ibrahim Nasasra							
Ma'ale Iron	Mahmoud Jabarin		1,006	93.5				
Ma'ale Iron	Majdi Aghbaria		70	6.5				
Maghar	Farid Ganem							
Maghar	Ziad Dagesh							
Majd al-Krum	Salim Salibi		1,055	61.1				
Majd al-Krum	Muhammad Hatib		672	38.9				
Majdal Shams	Dolan Abu Saleh		259	95.6				
Majdal Shams	Tareq Al-Safdi		8	3.0				
Majdal Shams	Ramez Abu Salah		3	1.1				
Majdal Shams	Munejd Abu Salah		1	0.4				
Mas'ade								
Mashhad	Wajia Suleiman							
Mashhad	Abed Hassan							
Mazkeret Batya	Gabi Gaon	Gabi Gaon	3,946	63.4	Gabi Gaon	1,622	44.5	
Mazkeret Batya	Meir Dahan	Lema'an Beitenu (Meir Dahan)	2,276	36.6	Lema'an Beitenu (Meir Dahan)	809	22.2	
Mazkeret Batya					Mazkeret Awakening	580	15.9	
Mazkeret Batya					Malei-More Arriving to You	425	11.6	
Mazkeret Batya					Beyahad (Shiri Gonen)	213	5.8	
Mazra'a	Fuad Awad		414	69.7				
Mazra'a	Kasem Awad		180	30.3				
Meitar	Shimon Peretz							
Meitar	Shimon Mazuz							
Metula	David Azulai		633	67.2	One Metula	580	61.8	
Metula	Lior Baz		222	23.6	Mitzpun LeMetula	247	26.3	
Metula	Roit Sandler Yafo		87	9.2	Atid Metula	112	11.9	
Mevaseret Zion	Yoram Shimon (incumbent)		6,743	89.5				
Mi'ilya	Hatam Araf		1,314	61.1				
Mi'ilya	Yosef Gabris		835	38.9				
Mitzpe Ramon	Roni Merom		1,358	60.8	Ahdut	597	26.4	
Mitzpe Ramon	Gil Atli		463	20.7	Initiative and Change	408	18.0	
Mitzpe Ramon	Flora Shushan		414	18.5	Kulanu	343	15.2	
Mitzpe Ramon					Yisrael Beiteinu	336	14.8	
Mitzpe Ramon					Mitzpe LeMitzpaim	299	13.2	
Mitzpe Ramon					One Mitzpe	280	12.3	
Nahef	Abd al-Bast Qis		3090	89.02				
Nahef	Muhammad Zori		381	10.98				
Omer	Pini Badash		2,358	51.2				
Omer	Sima Kahlon		2,246	48.8				
Pardes Hana-Karkur	Eldad Bar Kochba							
Pardes Hana-Karkur	Hagar Peri Yagur							
Pardesiya	Tal Gorky		1,986	59.3	Mamshichim Yachad BeTenufa	1,609	48.0	
Pardesiya	Tomer Yefet		1,365	40.7	New Age in Pardesiya	1,015	30.3	
Pardesiya					Jewish Home	287	8.6	
Pardesiya					Likud	275	8.2	
Pardesiya					Kulanu	165	4.9	
Peki'in	Sawid Sawid		1,639	43.9				
Peki'in	Ramez Ahmed		1,125	30.1				
Peki'in	Daher Hir		804	21.5				
Peki'in	Eyad Abbas		168	4.5				
Qatzrin	Dmitri Apartzev (incumbent)		1,838	50.6				
Qatzrin	Vicki Badrian		1,792	49.4				
Ramat Yishay	Ofir Ben Eliezer		1,571	41.5	Tut	1,135	29.8	
Ramat Yishay	Yehonatan Nimrod Hirschfeld		978	25.8	Rama Afar Ben Eliezer	1,062	27.9	
Ramat Yishay	Yitzhak Nir Havkin		660	17.4	Siat Mahar Im Yehonatan Hirschfield	648	17.0	
Ramat Yishay	Livi Elkrif		578	15.3	Karish Kulanu Ramat Yishay	493	12.9	
Ramat Yishay					Hadar BeReshut Yitzhak Nir Havkin	471	12.4	
Rame	Shauqi Latif		1,076	84.5				
Reineh	Jamil Basul		3,836	40.7				
Reineh	Khaled Tatur		2,464	26.2				
Reineh	Tisir Basul		1,330	14.1				
Rosh Pina	Moti Hatiel				Rosh Pina Shel Kulanu	410	32.9	
Rosh Pina	Aharon Barnazon				Gei Oni	331	26.5	
Rosh Pina					New Wind	274	22.0	
Sajur	Hatam Ganem		1,271	45.8				
Sajur	Jabar Hamud		1,270	45.8				
Sajur	Sameh Ibrahim		234	8.4				
Savyon	Moti Landau		1,392	65.8				
Savyon	Dafna Dambinsky		722	34.2				
Segev Shalom	Ammar Abu Mamar		2,441	58.9				
Segev Shalom	Samir Ben Said		1,705	41.1				
Sha'ab	Mahmoud Boqai		765	49.9				
Sha'ab	Ali Khualed		418	27.3				
Sha'ab	Nasser al-Nasser		131	8.5				
Sha'ab	Hussein Azaziah		90	5.9				
Sha'ab	Samir Khatib		71	4.6				
Sha'ab	Said Abd-al-Rahman		58	3.8				
Shibli-Umm al-Ghanam	Monir Shibli							
Shibli-Umm al-Ghanam	Naim Shibli							
Shlomi	Gabriel Na'aman		1,465	45.2				
Shlomi	David Dar		1,181	36.4				
Shlomi	Shifra Joaquin		394	12.1				
Shlomi	Issachar Bobalil		203	6.3				
Tel Sheva	Omar Abu Raqaiq		2,915	39.4				
Tel Sheva	Musa Alassam		2,523	34.1				
Tel Tzion (see also results for Kokhav Ya'akov)	Avraham Avital (incumbent)	Lev Echad						
Tel Tzion (see also results for Kokhav Ya'akov)	Eli Bar On	Lma'an Achai						
Tel Tzion (see also results for Kokhav Ya'akov)	Roni Chori	Kokhav Ya'akov Barosh						
Tuba-Zangariyye	Wissam Omar		1,937	53.4				
Tuba-Zangariyye	Hussein Haib		1,688	46.6				
Tur'an	Mazen Saman		1,458	55.0				
Tur'an	Imad Dahla		1,040	39.2				
Tur'an	Mahmoud Nasser		140	5.3				
Tur'an	Dahla Muhammad		15	0.6				
Yafa an-Naseriyye	Mahar Halilia		4,865	47.5				
Yafa an-Naseriyye	Imran Kanana		4,021	39.3				
Yafa an-Naseriyye	Ibrahim Sirhan		813	7.9				
Yafa an-Naseriyye	Hussein Hatib		366	3.6				
Yafa an-Naseriyye	Abdullah Husseinia		176					
Yanuh-Jat	Muadad Sa'ad		965	72.6				
Yanuh-Jat	Mada Hasbani		364	27.4				
Yarka	Hatem Italla		4,666	50.1				
Yarka	Wahib Habish		4,650	49.9				
Yavne'el	Roni Cohen (incumbent)				Yesha Bricha	484	23.8	
Yavne'el	Snir Daniel Arish				HaBricha LeYavne'el	372	18.3	
Yavne'el					LaAtid Yavne'el	336	16.6	
Yavne'el					One Yavne'el	201	9.9	
Yavne'el					This is the Time	194	9.6	
Yavne'el					United Religious Front	158	7.8	
Yavne'el					HaAhava LeYavne'el Tenatzeah	103	5.1	
Yavne'el					Likud	70	3.4	
Yeruham	Tal Ohana	Kulanu	3,104	59.0				
Yeruham	Nili Aharon	Likud	1,706	32.4				
Yeruham	Ilan Almakeis		451	8.6				
Yesud HaMa'ala	Ilan Or		533	56.8	One Yesud HaMa'ala	509	54.0	
Yesud HaMa'ala	Oded Mizrahi		406	43.2	Yachad	296	31.4	
Yesud HaMa'ala					Lema'an Hamoshava	137	14.5	
Zarzir	Amir Mazariv							
Zarzir	Hasan Hayav							
Zemer	Rami Zidan							
Zemer	Tamim Harzalla							
Zikhron Ya'akov	Ziv Deshe (incumbent)		5,614	49.7				
Zikhron Ya'akov	Eli Abutbul		4,928	43.6				
Zikhron Ya'akov	Yitzhak Baruch		759	6.7				
