= Amir Kochavi =

Mayor of Hod HaSharon, Israel

- אמיר כוכבי
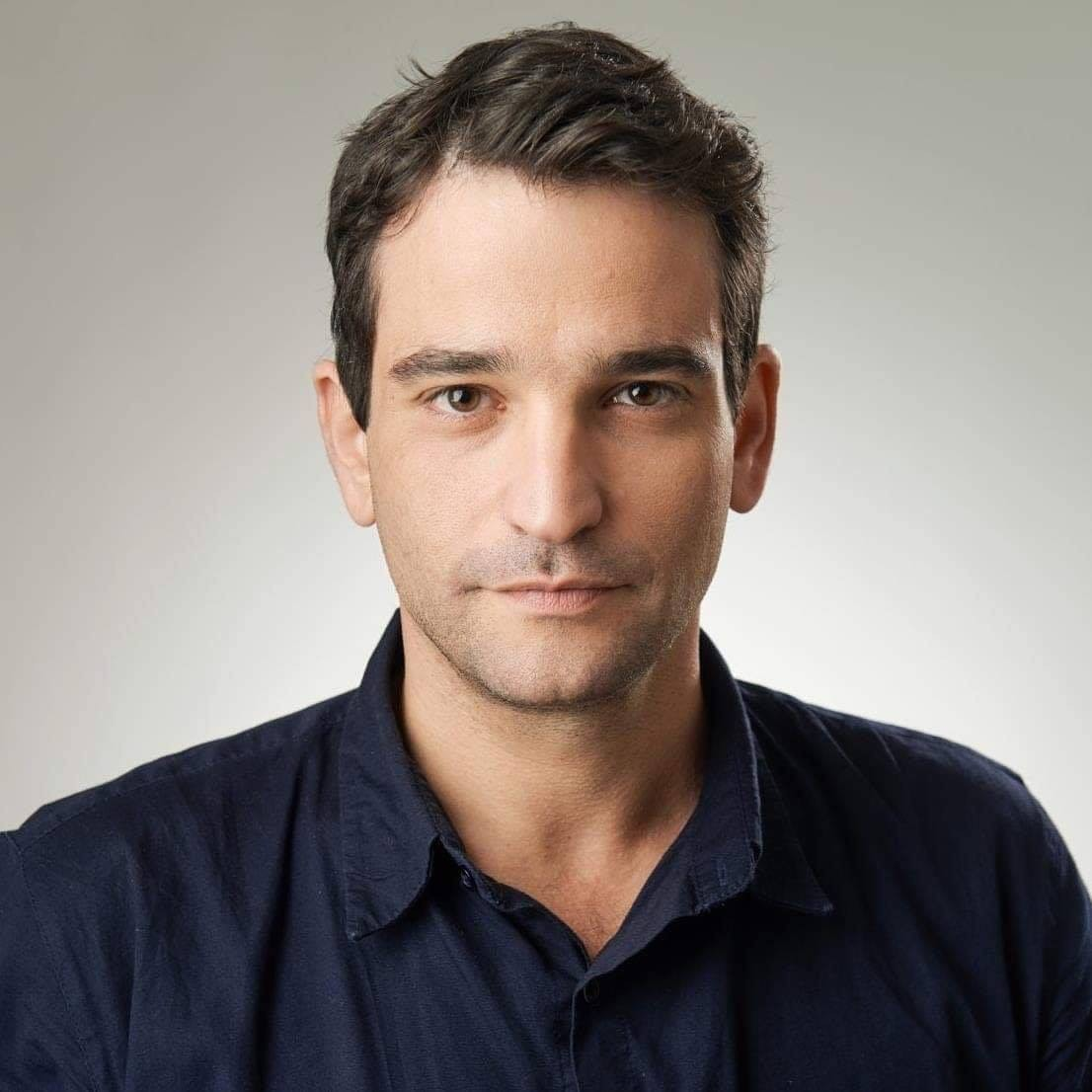
- Amir Kochavi

Mayor of Hod HaSharon, Israel

Personal details
- Born: May 10, 1980 (age 46)

Amir Kochavi (Hebrew: אמיר כוכבי; born May 10, 1980) is the mayor of Hod HaSharon, Israel.

== Biography ==
Kochavi is the son of Naphtali and Yona Kochavi, and a descendant of Rabbi Elimelech of Lizhensk. His grandfather, Shlomo Kochavi, served as a member of the city council of Rishon LeZion. In his youth, he studied at the "Hadarim" high school in Hod HaSharon. Kochavi is an Israel Defense Forces reserve officer.

Kochavi holds a Bachelor's degree in Politics and Government and Middle East Studies from Ben-Gurion University and a Master's degree in Government and Public Administration with a specialization in local government from the Interdisciplinary Center Herzliya. Before entering municipal politics, Kochavi worked in the Knesset alongside Roni Bar-On.

In 2008 Kochavi founded the Ketzev – Social Urban Movement party, through which he was elected to the city council in two election cycles. Between 2008 and 2018, he served as the party chairman, deputy mayor, and city council member. In the 2013 elections, he joined forces with the Meretz party in the city, and the parties ran together under the "Ketzev-Meretz" list. In the 2018 elections, the joint party united with the local Yesh Atid branch and ran together under the "Ketzev-Meretz-Yesh Atid" list.

In the October 2018 local elections he received 29.5% of the votes in the first round and advanced to the second round against former Knesset member Yifat Kariv, who received 18.9% support. Prior to the second round, the Israeli Labor Party withdrew its support for Kariv. In the second round, Kochavi was elected mayor with 69.7% support, compared to 30.3% for Kariv.

In 2023 Kochavi announced that he intends to lead protests against Israeli judicial reform and in support of women's rights, urging residents to participate in a women's march. He wrote, "Where there is no equality and rights, there is racism, intimidation, and violence." However, not everyone in the city appreciated his stance, with some questioning why he was taking a side, arguing that he should be the mayor for everyone.
