= Yoni Chetboun =

Politician and officer in the Israel Defense Force

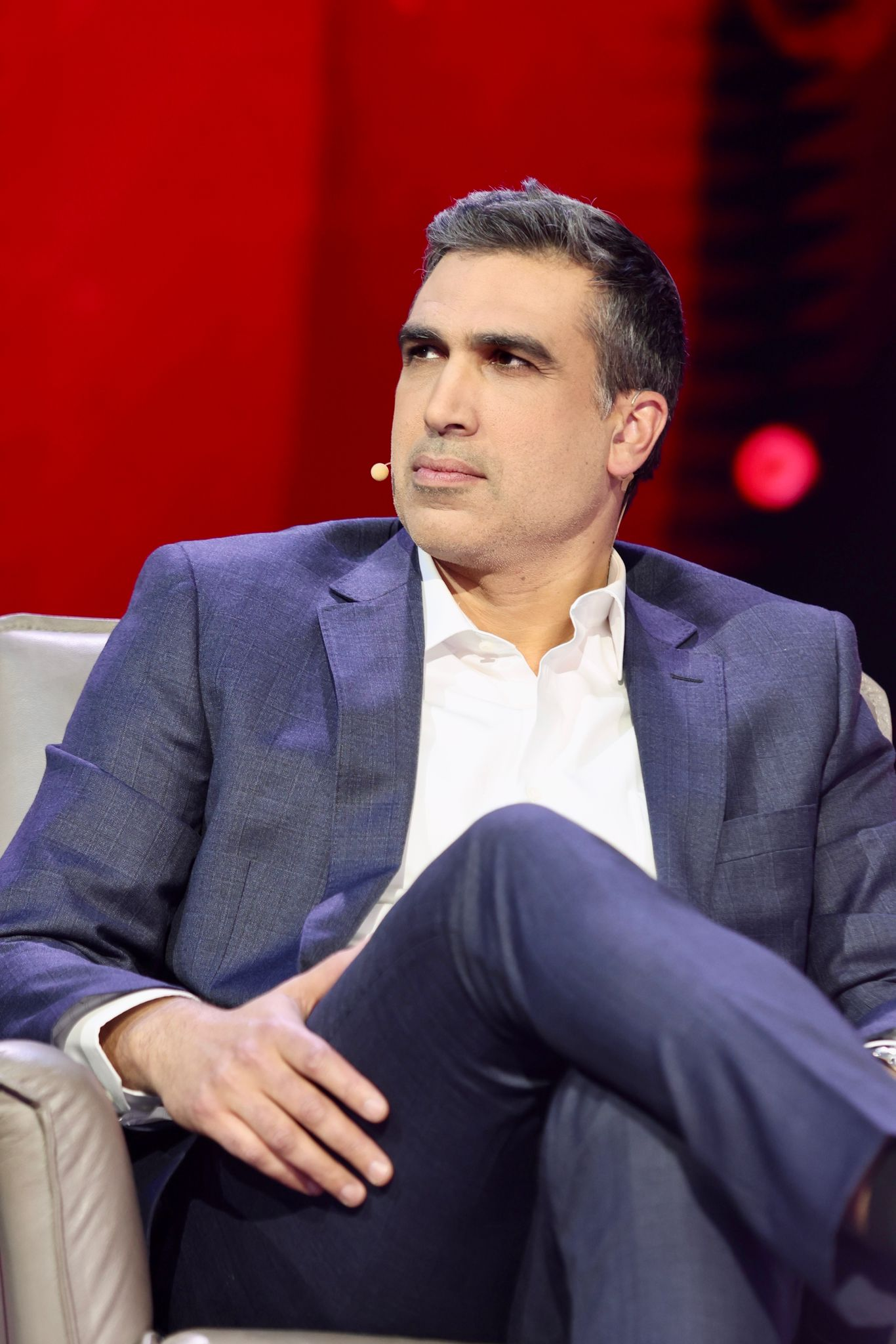

Faction represented in the Knesset
- 2013–2015: Jewish Home

Other roles
- 2013–2015: Deputy Speaker of the Knesset

Personal details
- Born: 13 March 1979 (age 47) Nahariya, Israel
- Military career
- Allegiance: Israel
- Branch: Israeli Army
- Service years: 1998–2008
- Rank: Colonel
- Units: Egoz Unit; Golani Brigade
- Commands: Egoz Unit; Golani Brigade
- Conflicts: Operation Defensive Shield; South Lebanon conflict Second Intifada 2006 Lebanon War

- Awards: Chief of Staff Citation

Jonathan "Yoni" Chetboun (Hebrew: יונתן "יוני" שטבון; born 13 March 1979) is an Israeli politician, businessman, and retired IDF Colonel. Chetboun was a member of the Knesset, where he sat on the Foreign Affairs and Defense Committee. During his active-duty service, the IDF awarded him the Chief of Staff Citation for actions taken during the Second Lebanon War. He is the CEO of Kanaf Strategy, a strategic consulting firm for companies and public organizations.

== Biography ==
Yonatan ("Yoni") Chetboun was born in Nahariya to French-Jewish parents, soon after they immigrated to Israel. His father, Dr. Israel Chetboun, is a senior cardiologist. His parents named him after Yonatan Netanyahu. After his birth, his family moved to Netanya, where he grew up and attended a Bnei Akiva yeshiva high school. He holds a BA in government diplomacy and strategy, with honors, from the Interdisciplinary Center Herzliya, and an MBA in business management from the Hebrew University. He currently lives in Netanya, and is married to Ma'ayan, the daughter of Australian immigrants, with 8 children.

== Military career ==
In 1998, Chetboun was drafted into the Israel Defense Forces and joined the Golani Brigade. Eventually, he was selected for the Egoz elite unit, which specializes in anti-terror and anti-guerilla operations. During his service, he completed the infantry officer course and was a staff commander for Egoz during various anti-terror operations in Lebanon, Gaza, and the Israeli-occupied West Bank. As part of Operation Defensive Shield, his unit was tasked with surrounding the Mukata’a, the office of Yasser Arafat, then Chairman of the Palestinian Authority. Later, he became a company commander.

He was an operations officer for Golani Battalion 51 at the time of the Second Lebanon War and saw action at the Battle of Bint Jbeil. One of the casualties of Bint Jbeil was Major Roi Klein, a friend and commander of Chetboun's, who famously jumped on a grenade to save a number of soldiers on the battlefield. During the battle, Chetboun removed Klein's body from the battlefield and replaced him as commander. Chetboun was awarded the Chief of Staff citation for actions taken during Bint Jbeil. He was discharged from active duty in 2008, but continues to actively serve in the reserves as a Lieutenant Colonel (battalion commander).

== Public activism ==
In 2009, Chetboun organized rallies in support of the IDF and the residents of southern Israel during Operation Cast Lead. Chetboun believed that in the Second Lebanon War, a lack of public support hurt the soldiers he led, and this encouraged him to organize the rallies.

In 2010, Chetboun founded the Ra'ananim Zionist youth movement. The organization was active in strengthening Zionism and Jewish identity among Israeli youth.

At this time, Chetboun also became a speaker for the IDF as well as schools, universities, and conferences, on the topics of leadership and decision making. He also began lecturing to congressmen about Israel's security and its place in the world order.

== Political career ==
In 2012, Chetboun joined the Jewish Home party and was elected to the 7th spot on the party list. The party won 12 seats in the next elections, and Chetboun became a member of the 19th Knesset.

In the Knesset, Chetboun was the Deputy Speaker of the Knesset, a member of the Foreign Affairs and Defense Committee, and a member of Israel's delegation to NATO. He founded the Neighborhood Forum, which promoted local grassroots leadership. In light of increased immigration from France, he started the Lobby for the Absorption of French Immigrants in Israel. He also founded the Lobby for Standing Army and Reserve Soldiers.

Chetboun passed a number of laws, including:

- Consumer Protection Bill: The bill made supermarket chains honor the full value of food vouchers if they were used within five years. Previously, some chains would take a percentage off of the vouchers.
- Higher Education Council Bill: The bill cancelled the rights to student benefits for those who avoid military service.

During the 19th Knesset, a bill was proposed to enlist ultra-Orthodox Jews into the army. Chetboun led the fight within the coalition against the bill, and provided the only opposition vote.

On December 14, 2014, Chetboun left the Jewish Home party, and joined Eli Yishai's new Yachad party. He stressed his belief in the fact that the new party could bring unity between all sectors in Israel and provide support for the periphery. He was placed second on the party's list for the 2015 Israeli legislative election, but did not receive a seat in the 20th Knesset.

On 15 January 2018, Chetboun announced he was running for mayor of Netanya in the upcoming municipal elections. He garnered 26.71% of the vote in the city, coming second in the race.

== Business career ==
Global Award for Innovation & International Cooperation - Dubai 2024

In 2011, Chetboun founded Kanaf Strategy, of which he is the executive director. He give lectures to companies and public organizations around the world about Israeli security and decision-making under pressure.

== Published works ==
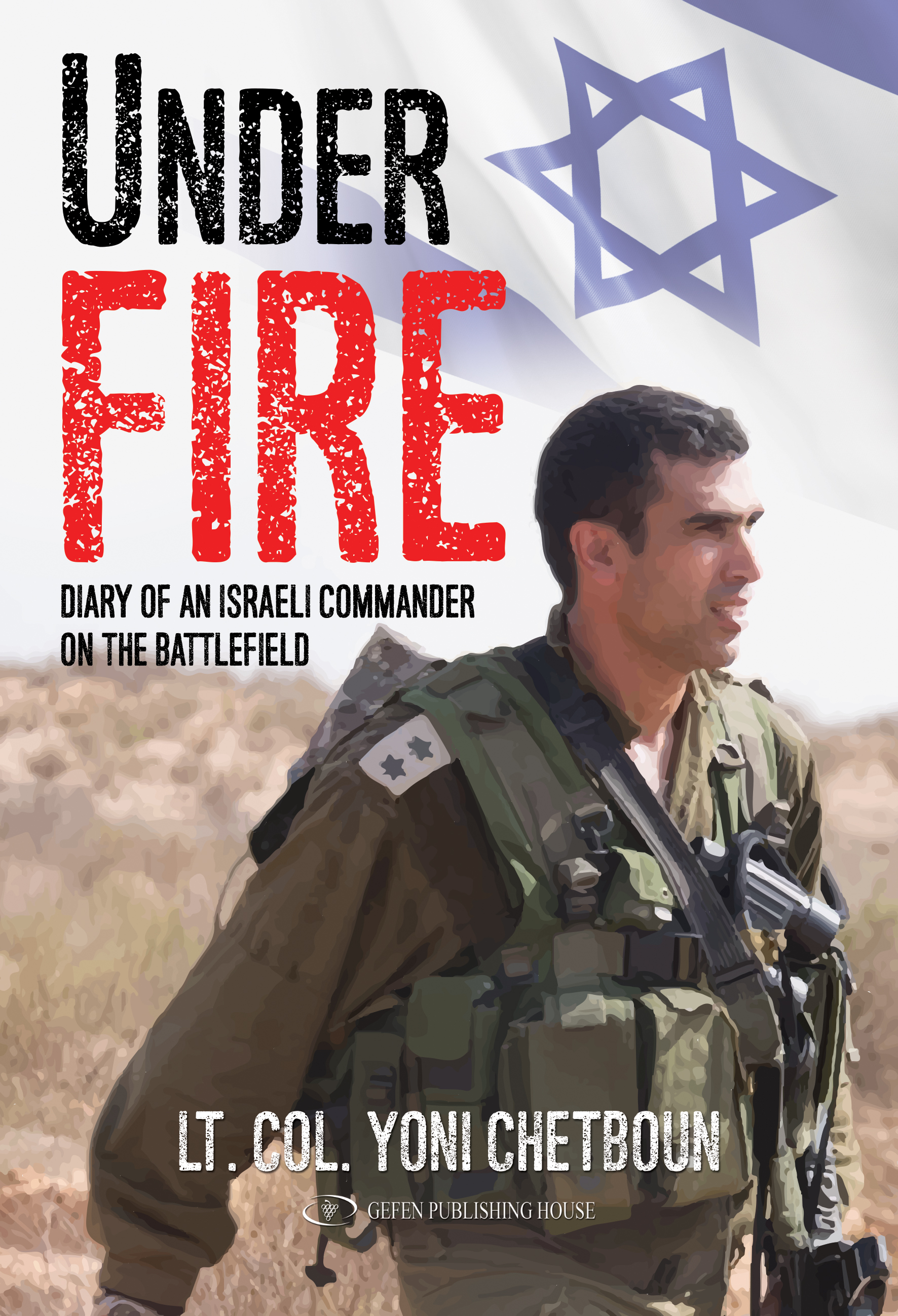
Under Fire book cover

In June 2016, Chetboun published a book in Hebrew titled Under Fire (Heb.: Tahat Esh) with Yediot Sfarim Publishing, one of the biggest publishing houses in Israel. The book recounts his experiences in the army, including stories from the field and reflection on the effects of service on his family life. It gives insight into the actions of Roi Klein and how Chetboun made decisions under fire in the battlefield. It also describes his ideas regarding Israeli security. The book is being translated into English and French with Gefen Publishing.

== Gallery ==
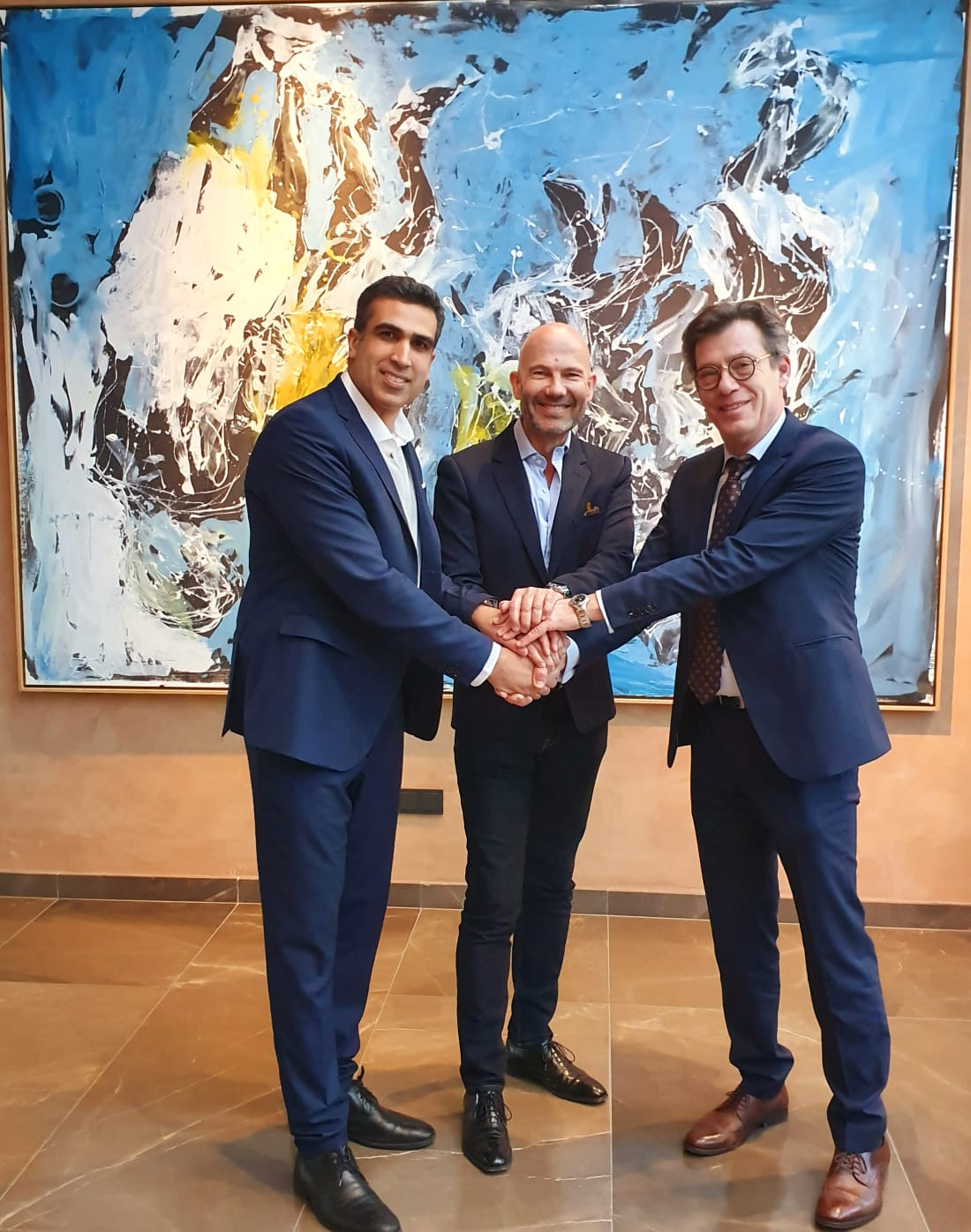
Yoni Chebtoun meeting ambassador Emmanuel Nachschon in Luxemburg, 2020

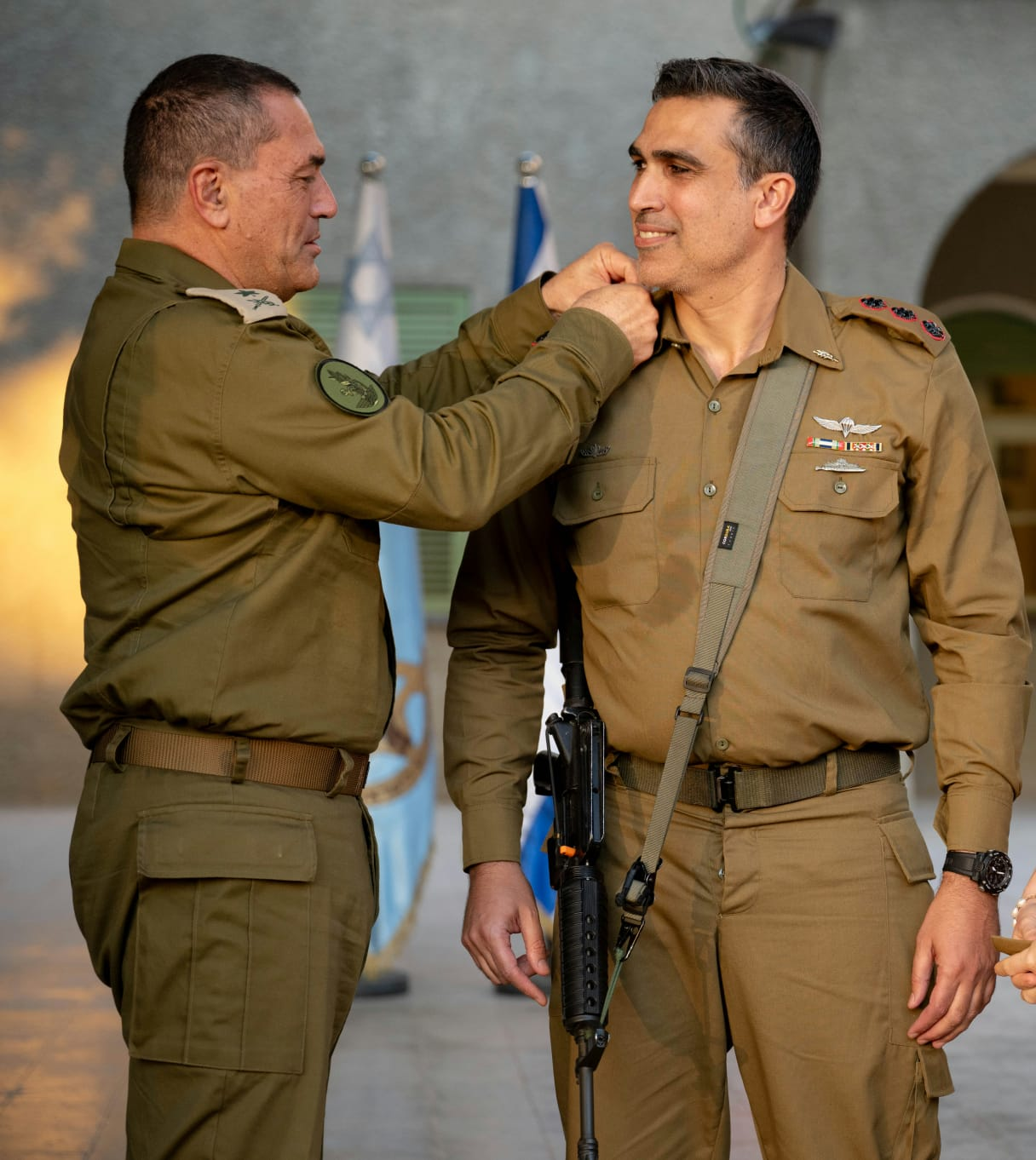
Chetboun receiving the Aluf Mishne rank from Eyal Zamir, 2025

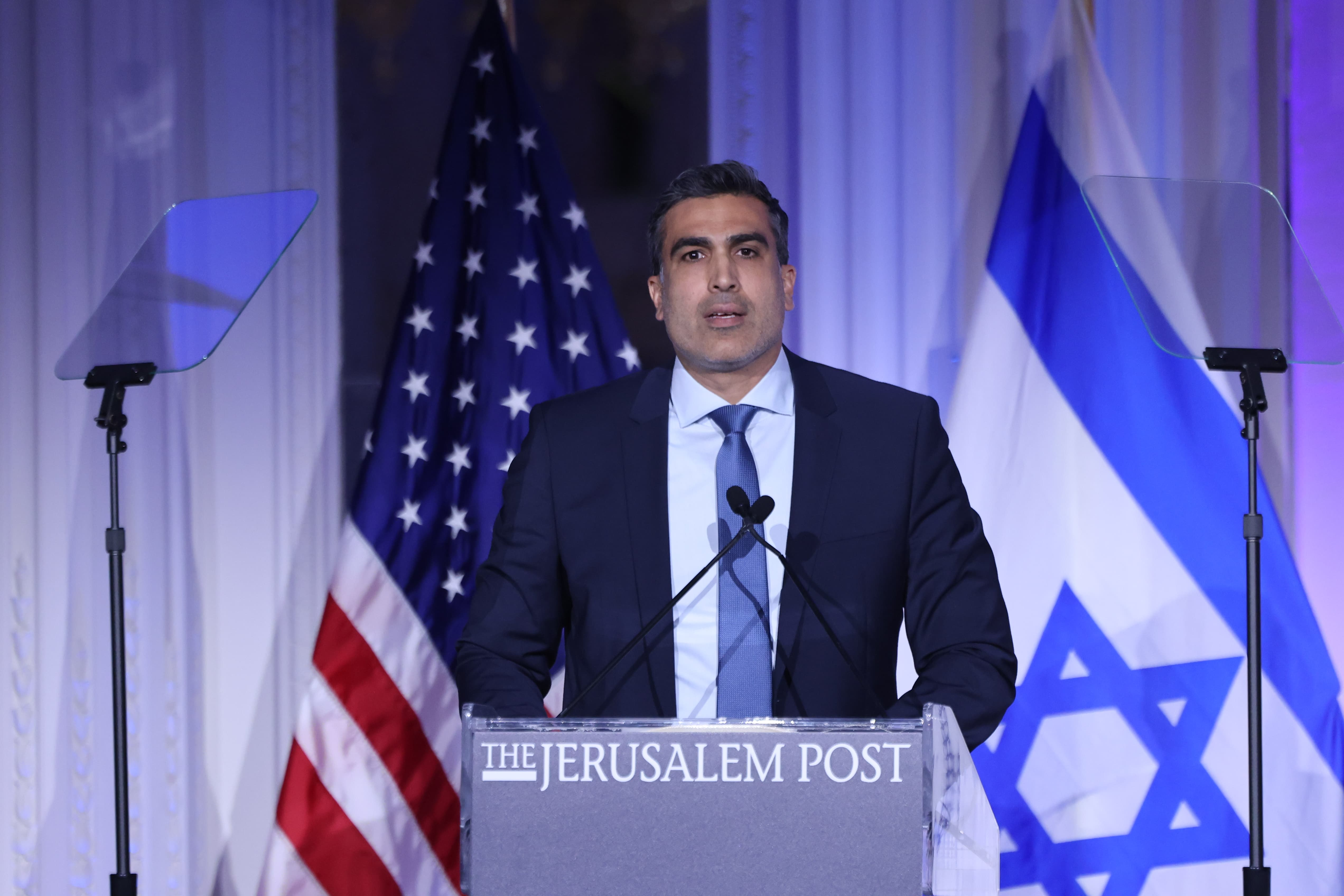
Speaker at the JP conference NY (2025)

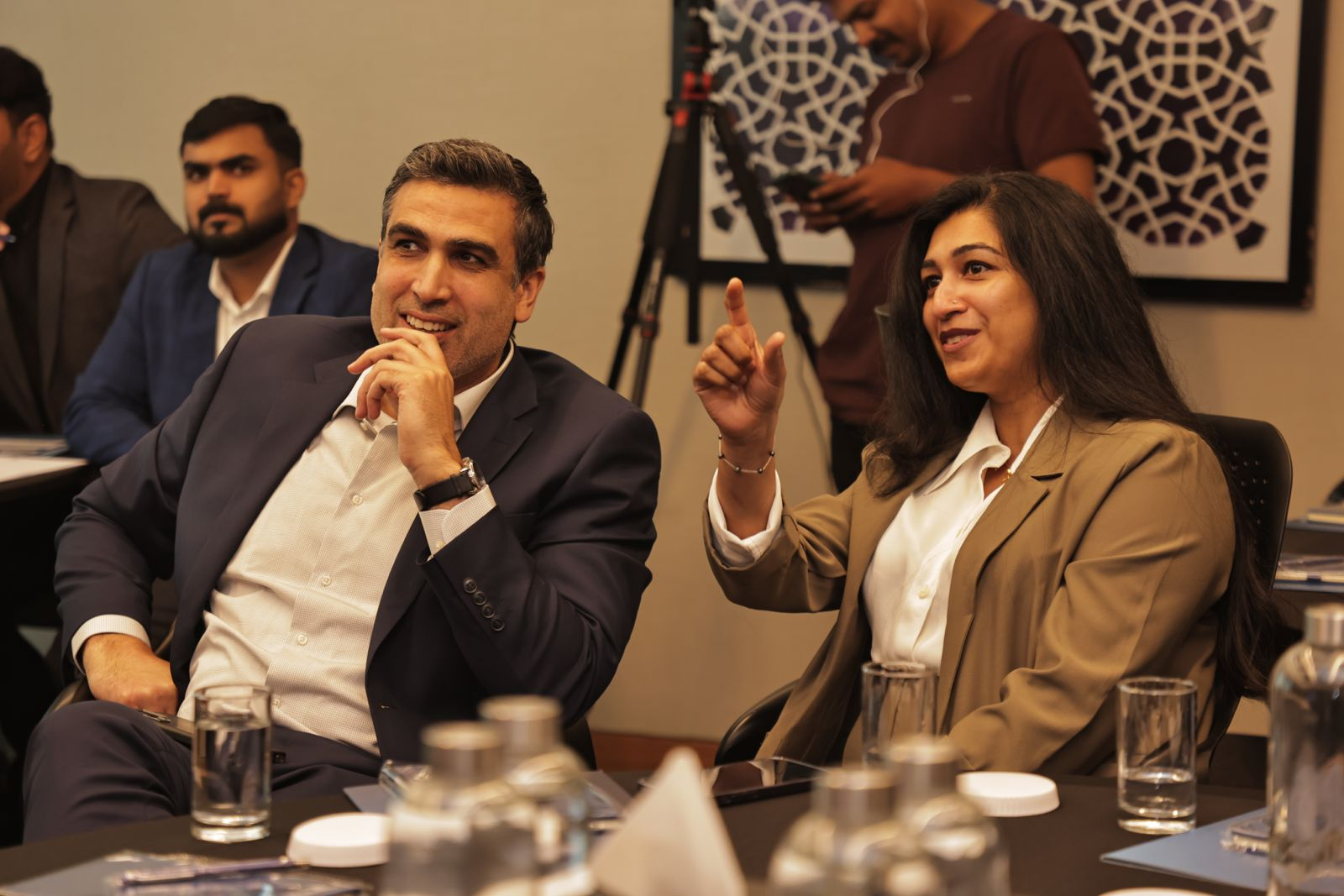
International Business Development - CEO Jonathan Chetboun
