= Shlomo Bohbot =

Israeli politician

- שלמה בוחבוט
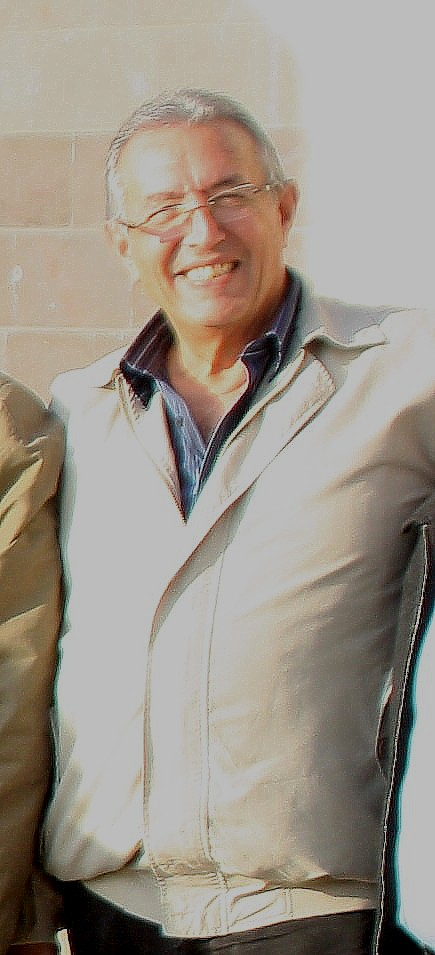

Faction represented in the Knesset
- 1992–1996: Labor Party

Personal details
- Born: 8 November 1942 (age 82); Morocco

Shlomo Bohbot (Hebrew: שלמה בוחבוט; born 8 November 1942) is an Israeli politician who was mayor of Ma'alot-Tarshiha from 1976 until 2018 and also served as a member of the Knesset for the Labor Party between 1992 and 1996.

== Biography ==
Born in Morocco in 1942, Bohbot made aliyah to Israel in 1954 under the Youth Aliyah programme. Between 1963 and 1971 he worked in the social services department of Ma'alot-Tarshiha local council. He was elected to the municipal council in 1974, and became head of the municipal council in 1976, a post equivalent to mayor. When Ma'alot-Tarshiha became a city in 1995, Bohbot continued as mayor, and held the post until defeated by Arkady Pomerantz in the 2018 local elections. He also served as deputy chairman of the Development town forum.

Bohbot joined Ezer Weizman's Yahad party, and was fifth on its list for the 1984 elections, although the party won only three seats. He later joined the Labor Party, and in 1992 he was elected to the Knesset on its list. He lost his seat in the 1996 elections due to a new law which prevented mayors from also serving in the Knesset. In 2006 he left the Labor Party to join Kadima, but left the new party the following year. In 2009 he became head of the Local Government Centre, a position in which he served until 2014.
