= Rami Greenberg =

Israeli politician

- רמי גרינברג
- Rami Greenberg in 2024

Mayor of Petah Tikva
- Incumbent
- Assumed office 20 November 2018
- Preceded by: Itzik Braverman

Personal details
- Born: May 18, 1978 (age 48) Neve Yarak, Israel
- Party: Likud

Rami Greenberg (Hebrew: רמי גרינברג; born 18 May 1978) is an Israeli politician, currently serving as the mayor of Petah Tikva.

== Biography ==
Greenberg was born in Neve Yarak, and grew up in Petah Tikva. At the age of 14, he was elected to serve as the chairman of the city's Likud youth organisation, and at the age of 16, was elected to serve as the chair of the national Likud youth. During his time in the Israel Defense Forces, Greenberg served as an officer in the Duvdevan Unit. He subsequently joined the Israel Police, serving as a detective. He subsequently studied Criminal law in the Academic Center for Law and Science, becoming a lawyer.

From 2003 to 2006, Greenberg worked in Hod HaSharon's Department of Security, and served as a member of the Committee on Religious Affairs of the Drom HaSharon Regional Council. In 2012, he served as the Manager of the Department of Coordination and Oversight of Petah Tikva, until his removal by the Israeli Ministry of the Interior. He subsequently served as an advisor to Mayor Yitzhak Ohion.

In the 2013 Israeli municipal elections, Greenberg ran for Mayor of Petah Tikva under the Likud Party, but lost in the first round, coming in on third place. As his party won two seats in the city council, he became one of the party's two councillors.

In the 2018 Israeli municipal elections, Greenberg ran again for Mayor of Petah Tikva, under his own party, called Renewal (hithadshut) against the incumbent, Itzik Braverman. Greenberg won with 45% of the vote to Braverman's 36%, and was sworn into office on 20 November 2018.

In 2021, amidst the COVID-19 pandemic, Greenberg announced that the city would examine a possible establishment of Pfizer's Israeli development center within the Petah Tikva Municipality

On 11 July 2022, Greenberg was investigated for fraud, breach of trust, extortion, abuse of power, bribery and conspiracy to commit a crime. On 10 August, he was arrested alongside the city's director and investigated a second time.
