= Local committee (Israel) =

Local government entities

Local committees (Hebrew: ועד מקומי, Va'ad Mekomi) are administrative entities of communities found in Israel, which compose regional councils. Each community, managed by a local committee, within a regional council usually does not exceed 2,000 in population. This committee sends representatives to the administering regional council proportionate to their size of membership and according to an index which is fixed before each election.
