= Rafi Ben Shitrit =

Israeli politician

- Official portrait, 2026

Faction represented in the Knesset
- 2026–: Yisrael Beiteinu

Other roles
- 2003–2008: Deputy Mayor of Beit Shean
- 2013–2018: Mayor of Beit Shean

Personal details
- Born: 2 January 1966 (age 60) Beit Shean, Israel

Rafi Ben Shitrit (Hebrew: רפי בן שטרית, born 2 January 1966) is an Israeli politician.

== Biography ==
Ben Shitrit remarried in August 2015 to Tehila. His son Shimon Alroy Ben Shitrit was killed in combat during the October 7 attacks as he fought at Nahal Oz base.

First elected to Beit Shean's city council in 2003 as a Likud member, he soon fell out with mayor Jackie Levy, also of Likud. In the 2008 Israeli municipal elections he ran as an independent list, running both for mayor and for city council. As councilor he served as leader of the opposition.

In the 2013 Israeli municipal elections, Ben Shitrit was elected mayor of Beit Shean, defeating Levy by 96 votes. In the 2018 Israeli municipal elections, he lost re-election to Levy.

Ben Shitrit was given the second slot on Yisrael Beiteinu's party list ahead of the 2026 Israeli legislative election and was elected to the Knesset.
