= Itamar Shimoni =

Israeli politician

- איתמר שמעוני
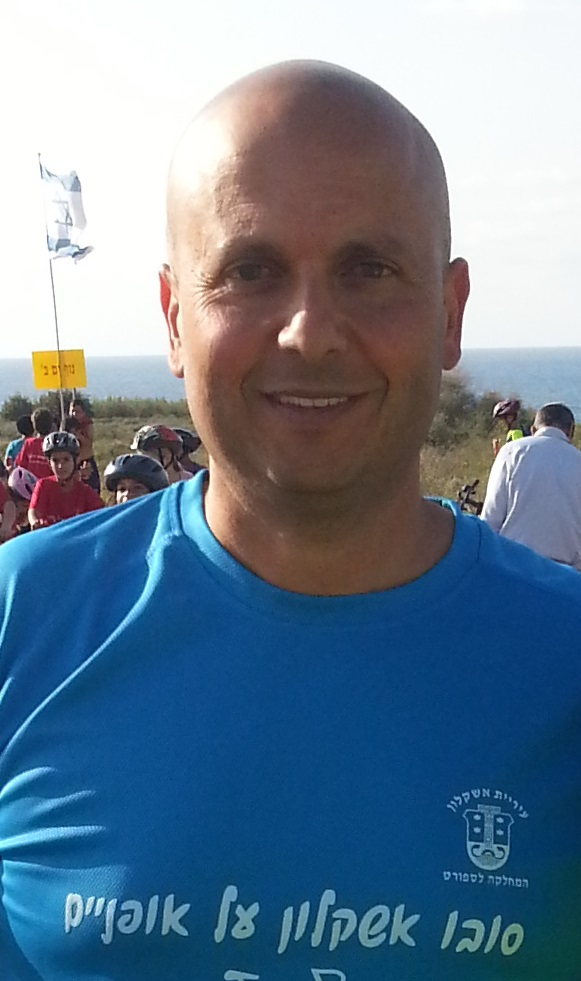

13th Mayor of Ashkelon
- In office 2013–2017
- Preceded by: Benny Vaknin
- Succeeded by: Tomer Gla'am

Personal details
- Born: 9 April 1968 (age 58)
- Spouse: Revital Shimoni

Itamar Shimoni (Hebrew: איתמר שמעוני; born 1968) is an Israeli politician. He was the mayor of Ashkelon from 2013 to 2017.

== Biography ==
Itamar Shimoni earned a B.A. in Business Administration, Engineering in Industrial Management. He has three children.

== Business career ==
Shimon was CEO of Atarim, Creative Manager at Teva Pharmaceutical Industries, and CEO of Dasco, an Israeli furniture manufacturer.

== Political career ==
In October 2013, Shimoni became mayor of Ashkelon when he defeated the incumbent, Benny Vaknin, who had served four terms. In his war on organized crime in the city, he ordered the closure of a restaurant owned by crime boss Shalom Domrani's family. In November 2013, he evacuated Ashkelon schools found to have high levels of radiation.

In November 2014, Shimoni announced that Arab construction workers would be banned from projects on the grounds of Israeli schools and kindergartens. This was in response to the 2014 Jerusalem synagogue massacre earlier that week, where two Palestinians from East Jerusalem killed four Jews and a Druze policeman. Prime Minister Benjamin Netanyahu and MKs denounced the ban, which they said was racist and illegal. Economy Minister Naftali Bennett said he would work to overturn Shimoni's order. Attorney General Yehuda Weinstein warned Shimoni against implementing his discriminatory plan, saying it would have serious legal ramifications. On the Sunday following his remarks, Shimoni said that he was trying to address concerns of parents, but would allow construction to continue, with children moved to a different venue until completion.

Shimoni was arrested on 5 January 2016 on charges of bribery, breach of trust, money laundering and rape. In May 2016, he returned to City Hall. The sex crime allegations were dropped due to lack of evidence.
