= Yifat Kariv =

Israeli politician (born 1973)

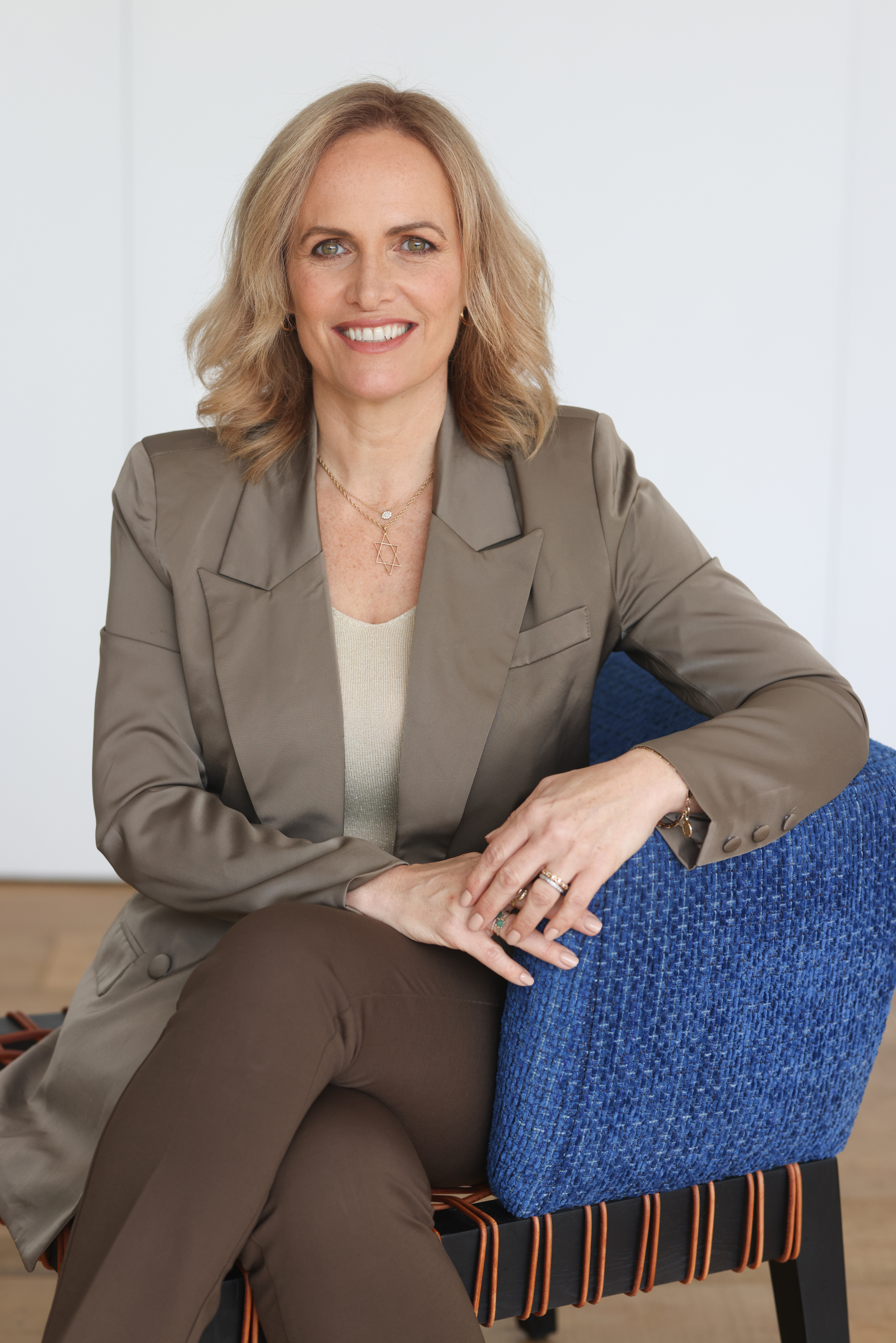
- Kariv in 2012

Faction represented in the Knesset
- 2013–2015: Yesh Atid

Personal details
- Born: 27 November 1973 (age 52) Beersheba, Israel

Yifat Kariv (Hebrew: יפעת קריב; born 27 November 1973) is an Israeli therapist and social worker. She served as a member of the Knesset for Yesh Atid between 2013 and 2015. Lecturer and expert in Jewish mental health and the development of personal and community healing processes. Founder of "The Work of the Heart," a healing community for women based on the teachings of the Mirrors, Hasidic, and the inner workings of the Torah.

== Biography ==
Born in Beersheba, Kariv attended Bar-Ilan University, where she gained bachelor's and master's degrees in social work. By 2013 she was employed as head of the youth department at the Ministry for the Development of the Negev and Galilee. She is a prominent social activist for women's rights and improvements in education. In 2008 she was elected to Hod HaSharon city council.

Prior to the 2013 Knesset elections she joined the new Yesh Atid party. She was placed sixteenth on its list, and was elected to the Knesset as the party won 19 seats.

She was placed sixteenth on the party's list again for the 2015 elections, but lost her seat as the party was reduced to eleven seats.

=== Local Government Work ===
Before entering national politics, Kariv served as a member of the city council of Hod Hasharon, where she held the Education portfolio, the Welfare portfolio, and the Women’s Advancement portfolio. In these roles she initiated municipal programs for children and teenagers, expanded services for families facing economic hardship, and promoted policies aimed at strengthening women’s participation in public and civic life.

=== Social and Community Activities ===
Kariv has long been active in social policy, focusing on children’s welfare, youth services, and gender equality. She led community-based initiatives for disadvantaged populations, including programs for youth at risk and services for children with special needs. Much of her public work reflects values often emphasized in Jewish communities worldwide, including social justice and support for vulnerable groups.

=== Legislation in the Knesset ===
During her term in the Knesset, Kariv promoted legislation in education, welfare, and women’s rights. One of her most notable achievements was her involvement in the 2014 amendment to the Prevention of Sexual Harassment Law, commonly known as the “Video Clips Law.” The amendment criminalized the non-consensual distribution of intimate photos or videos (“revenge porn”), defining it as a form of sexual harassment punishable by up to five years in prison. The law was widely regarded as a significant milestone in addressing digital sexual violence in Israel.

Kariv also supported measures to prevent gender segregation in public spaces and to strengthen protection and services for women in vulnerable situations.

=== Public Engagement After the Knesset ===
Following her parliamentary career, Kariv continued to be active in civil society, contributing to initiatives in education, welfare policy, gender equality, and community development. She remains involved in projects aimed at reducing social gaps and advancing children’s and women’s rights in Israel.

=== Therapeutic Work Inspired by Chasidic philosophy ===
In addition to her public and political activity, Kariv has been involved in therapeutic and educational work grounded in Chasidic philosophy. Her approach integrates elements of Hasidic thought—such as personal growth, compassion, and inner resilience—into guidance and support for individuals and families facing emotional and social challenges. Kariv specializes in treating trauma and complex sexual trauma. Since 2023, Kariv has focused on the field of healing the soul through tools from the world of clinical social work, alongside the doctrine of the soul from the inner workings of the Torah and Hasidism. Kariv founded the "Avoda Shevlev" community, a women's community that includes weekly classes, courses, lectures, and the activity combines professional tools from the world of Judaism. She lives in Hod Hasharon and is married to Dvir Kariv, a former Shin Bet officer[16] and the author of the book "Yitzhak - The Rabin Assassination: The Untold Story."
