= Haim Bibas =

Israeli politician

- חיים ביבס
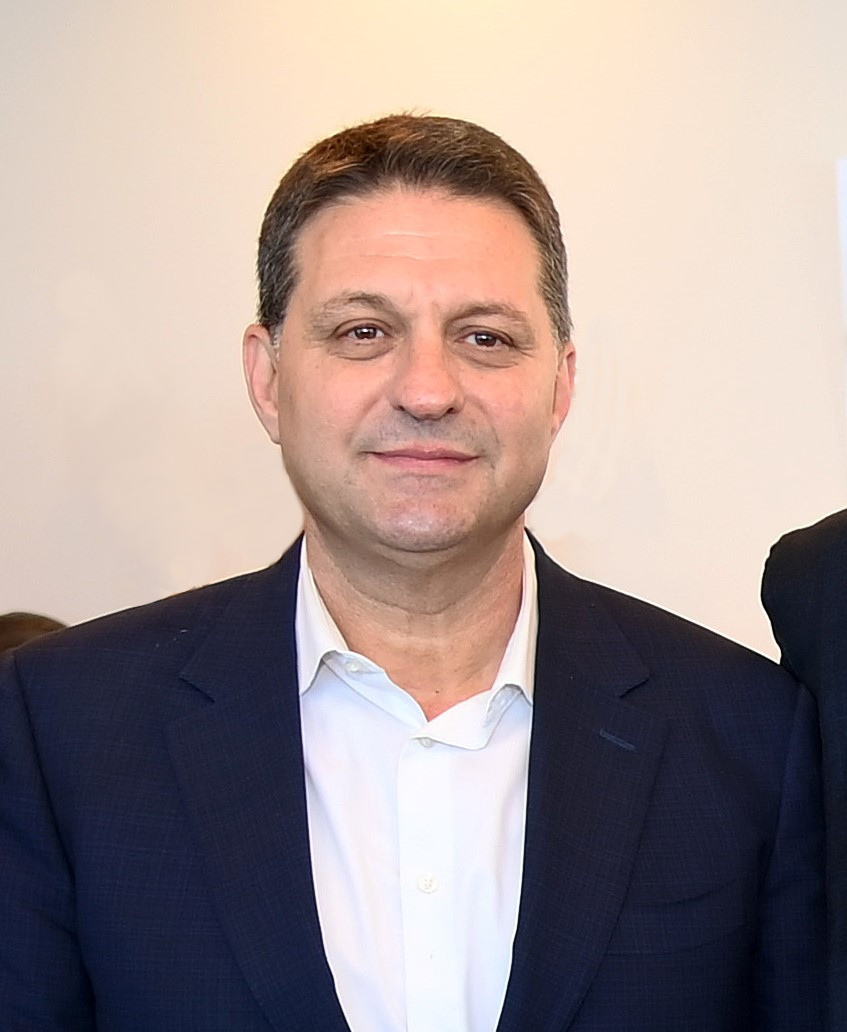

3rd mayor of Modi'in-Maccabim-Re'ut
- Incumbent
- Assumed office 2008-
- Preceded by: Moshe Spektor

Personal details
- Born: 1 December 1969 (age 56) Beit She'an, Israel
- Party: Likud

Haim Bibas (Hebrew: חיים ביבס; born 1 December 1969) is the third mayor of Modi'in-Maccabim-Re'ut, Israel, in office since 2008. Bibas has lived there with his wife and three children since 1997. He is the head of The Federation of Local Authorities in Israel since 2014.

== Education and army service ==
Bibas holds a bachelor's degree from the Department of Political Science, University of Haifa and a master's degree in Public Administration and Local Government, from Bar Ilan University. His thesis was on local government reform and professional city management. Bibas is a lieutenant colonel in IDF reserves.

== Political career ==
Prior to being elected Mayor of Modi'in Maccabim-Reut in 2008, Bibas served as Modi'in's voluntary Deputy Mayor. In 2007, Bibas served as the head of Benjamin Netanyahu's election campaign for Prime Minister. In January 2012, he was reappointed as chairman of Netanyahu's reelection campaign in the Likud elections.

Previous positions include; Director of International Projects and Development in Local Government, responsible for the construction of public institutions and local authorities. Bibas has held several positions in municipal management in local government. He was director of National Construction and Development Division and Construction Project Manager of Jerusalem and Central Region Environment and Transportation Authority. Bibas has been responsible for Modi'in's Planning and Development, a member of the City Council and Strategic Planning Team and a member of Modi'in's Education, Planning and Construction, Finance, Transportation and Security Committees.

In January, 2014, Bibas was elected as the head of the Federation of Local Authorities in Israel, winning 60 per cent of the vote. The Federation is the umbrella organisation for 265 local authorities, responsible for representing them to national government and other bodies.

== In the news ==
In August 2012, the European Union added Modi'in Maccabim-Reut to the list of Israeli settlements whose exports will not be considered as made in Israel, and thus no longer be eligible for tax breaks when imported to EU member countries. Bibas published an Op-Ed in the EU Observer countering the fact-less decision. He notoriously challenged this decision citing that "Not only is it an affront to the city of Modi’in. It is also an insulting and dangerous imposition on the sovereignty of the State of Israel, by seeking to unilaterally impose the limits of Israeli authority. Ours is a country which dreams of peace and will continue to strive for co-existence with our neighbours. Yet, the European Union’s decision, taken without real knowledge or understanding of our municipality and our region, is in danger of extending the boundaries of the conflict."

In January 2013, the Jerusalem Post published an Op-Ed by Bibas addressing the importance of education in growing the country's enlistment rate in the Israel Defense Force, specifically among Haredi and Arab communities. He stated that "The introduction of suitable educational programs in Haredi and Arab schools must be made possible to help these communities slowly but surely internalize the benefits of service". That same month, Modi'in Maccabim-Reut was recognized for having the highest enlistment rate in the country for the second year.
