= Revival of the Hebrew language =

Process of making Hebrew a lingua franca in Israel

Front page of HaZvi newspaper with a sub-headline reading "Newspaper for news, literature and science". HaZvi revolutionized Hebrew newspaper publishing in Jerusalem by introducing secular issues and techniques of modern journalism.

The revival of the Hebrew language took place in Europe and the Southern Levant toward the end of the 19th century and into the 20th century, through which the language's usage changed from the purely sacred language of Judaism to a spoken and written language used for daily life among the Jews in Palestine, and later Israel.

Eliezer Ben-Yehuda is often regarded as the "reviver of the Hebrew language", having been the first to raise the concept of reviving Hebrew and initiating the Ben-Yehuda Dictionary. The revitalization of Hebrew was then ultimately brought about by its usage in Jewish settlement in Ottoman Palestine that arrived in the waves of migration known as the First Aliyah and the Second Aliyah. In Mandatory Palestine, Modern Hebrew became one of three official languages and after the Israeli Declaration of Independence in 1948, one of two official languages of Israel, along with Modern Arabic. In July 2018, a new law made Hebrew the sole national language of the State of Israel, while giving Arabic a "special status".

More than purely a linguistic process, the revival of Hebrew was utilized by Jewish modernization and political movements, leading many people to change their names and becoming a tenet of the ideology associated with aliyah, the (re-)Hebraization of Palestinian place names, Zionism, and Israeli policy.

The process of Hebrew's return to regular usage is unique; there are no other examples of a natural language without any native speakers subsequently acquiring several million native speakers, and no other examples of a sacred language becoming a national language with millions of native speakers.

The language's revival eventually brought linguistic additions with it. While the initial leaders of the process insisted they were only continuing "from the place where Hebrew's vitality was ended", what was created represented a broader basis of language acceptance; it includes characteristics derived from all periods of Hebrew language, as well as from the non-Hebrew languages used by the long-established European, North African, and Middle Eastern Jewish communities, with Yiddish being predominant.

== Background ==
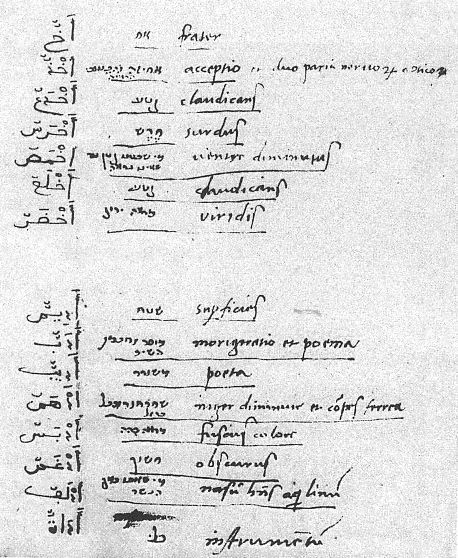
Arabic–Hebrew–Latin dictionary, 1524

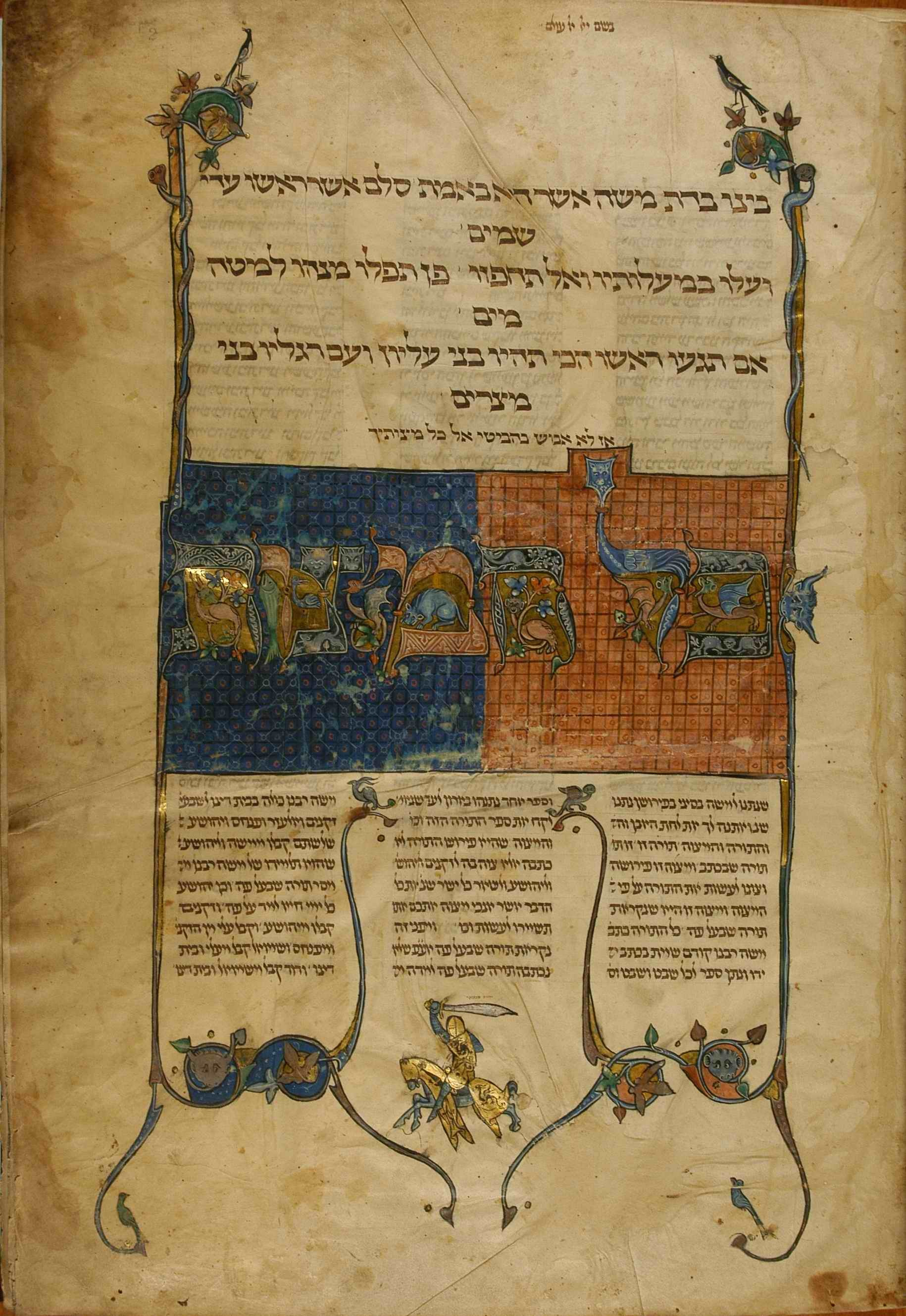
Mishneh Torah, written in Hebrew by Maimonides.

Historical records testify to the existence of Hebrew from the 10th century BCE to the late Second Temple period (lasting to 70 CE), after which the language developed into Mishnaic Hebrew. From about the Babylonian Captivity in the 6th century BCE until the Middle Ages, many Jews spoke Aramaic, a related Semitic language. From the 2nd century CE until the revival of Hebrew as a spoken language circa 1880, Hebrew served as a literary and official language and as the Judaic language of prayer. After the spoken usage of Mishnaic Hebrew ended in the 2nd century CE, Hebrew had not been spoken as a mother tongue.

Even so, during the Middle Ages, Jews used the language in a wide variety of disciplines. This usage kept alive a substantial portion of the traits characteristic of Hebrew. First and foremost, Classical Hebrew was preserved in full through well-recognized sources, chiefly the Tanakh (especially those portions used liturgically like the Torah, Haftarot, Megilot, and the Book of Psalms) and the Mishnah. Apart from these, Hebrew was known through hymns, prayers, midrashim, and the like.

During the Middle Ages, Hebrew continued in use as a written language in Rabbinical literature, including in judgments of halakha, responsa, Biblical and Talmudic commentaries, and books of meditation. In most cases, certainly in the base of Hebrew's revival, 18th- and 19th-century Europe, the use of Hebrew was not at all natural, but heavy in flowery language and quotations, non-grammatical forms, and mixing-in of other languages, especially Aramaic. Hebrew also functioned as a language of secular high culture, and as a lingua franca between Jews from disparate countries. Jewish scientists and historians such as Abraham Zacuto and David Gans wrote in Hebrew, as did travelers such as Benjamin of Tudela and Chaim Yosef David Azulai.

Hebrew experienced a particular flourishing in Islamic Spain, where, under the influence of contemporary Islamic culture, scholars such as Shmuel HaNagid, Judah HaLevi, and Abraham Ibn Ezra extensively engaged in secular Hebrew poetry, discussing topics such as love, nature, and wine. The works of these Sephardic poets greatly influenced future attempts at Hebrew poetry, including the modern revival. Outside of Spain, the Jews of Yemen were especially known until contemporary times for their tradition of poetry, exemplified by revered 17th century rabbi and poet Shalom Shabazi. Other secular poets of the post-Spain era include Immanuel the Roman and Israel ben Moses Najara.

Otherwise, creative work in Hebrew was mostly limited to liturgical poems known as piyyutim, which were designed to be sung, chanted, or recited during religious services. This form originated in late antique Eretz Yisrael with poets such as Jose ben Jose, Eleazar ben Kalir, and Yannai and spread worldwide over subsequent centuries. The work of these early poets, often quite obscure, has been preserved mostly in the Italian, Romaniote (old Greek), and Ashkenazi rites; however, the general concept of religious poems to be sung during prayer is now common in all rites.

Hebrew was used not only in written form but also as an articulated language, in synagogues and in batei midrash. Thus, Hebrew phonology and the pronunciation of vowels and consonants were preserved. Despite this, regional influences of other languages caused many changes, leading to the development of different forms of pronunciation:

- Ashkenazi Hebrew, used by Eastern and Western European Jews, maintained mostly the structure of vowels but may have moved the stress and lost the gemination, although this cannot be known for certain, as there are no recordings of how the language (or its respective dialects) sounded e.g. in Canaan; Ashkenazi Hebrew pronunciation has a variation of vowels and consonants, which follows closely the variation of the vowel and consonant signs written down by the masoretes around the 7th century CE, indicating that there is a strong link with the language heard by them. For example, where we see two different vowel signs, or a consonant with or without a dogeish (dagesh), a difference is also heard in the various Ashkenazic pronunciations.
- Sephardi Hebrew, used by Sephardi Jews, preserved a structure different from the recognized Tiberian Hebrew niqqud of only five vowels, but did preserve the consonants, the grammatical stress, the dagesh, and the schwa; however, different ways of writing consonants are not always heard in all Sephardic pronunciations. For example, the Dutch Sephardic pronunciation does not distinguish between the beth with and without dagesh: both are pronounced as "b". The "taf" is always pronounced as "t", with or without dagesh. There are at least two possibilities to explain the merger: the difference disappeared over time in the Sephardic pronunciations, or it never was there in the first place: the pronunciation stems from a separate Hebrew dialect, which always was there, and which for example the Masoretes did not use as reference.
- Yemenite Hebrew, thought by Aaron Bar-Adon to preserve much of the Classical Hebrew pronunciation, was barely known when the revival took place.

Within each of these groups, there also existed different subsets of pronunciation. For example, differences existed between the Hebrew used by Polish Jewry and that of Lithuanian Jewry and of German Jewry.

In the fifty years preceding the start of the revival process, a version of spoken Hebrew already existed in the markets of Jerusalem. The Sephardic Jews who spoke Judaeo-Spanish or Arabic and the Ashkenazi Jews who spoke Yiddish needed a common language for commercial purposes. The most obvious choice was Hebrew. Although Hebrew was spoken in this case, it was not a native mother tongue, but more of a pidgin.

The linguistic situation against which background the revival process occurred was one of diglossia, when two languages—one of prestige and class and another of the masses—exist within one culture. In Europe, this phenomenon has waned, starting with English in the 16th century, but there were still differences between spoken street language and written language. Among the Jews of Europe, the situation resembled that of the general population, but with:

- Yiddish as the spoken language
- the language of the broader culture (depending on the country), used for secular speech and writing
- Hebrew employed for liturgical purposes

In the Arab Middle East, Judaeo-Spanish and Colloquial Arabic were the spoken languages most prevalent in Jewish communities (with Judaeo-Spanish more prevalent in the Mediterranean and Arabic, Aramaic, Kurdish, and Persian more widely spoken by Jews in the East), while Classical Arabic was used for secular writing, and Hebrew used for religious purposes (though some Jewish scholars from the Arab world, such as Maimonides (1135–1204), wrote primarily in Arabic or in Judeo-Arabic languages).

== Revival of literary Hebrew ==
The revival of the Hebrew language in practice advanced in two parallel strains: The revival of written-literary Hebrew and the revival of spoken Hebrew. In the first few decades, the two processes were not connected to one another and even occurred in different places: Literary Hebrew was renewed in Europe's cities, whereas spoken Hebrew developed mainly in Palestine. The two movements began to merge only in the beginning of the 1900s, and an important point in this process was the immigration of Haim Nahman Bialik to Palestine in 1924. But after the transfer of literary Hebrew to Palestine, a substantial difference between spoken and written Hebrew remained, and this difference persists today. The characteristics of spoken Hebrew only began to seep into literature in the 1940s, and only in the 1990s did spoken Hebrew start widely appearing in novels.

The secularization of Hebrew, which included its use in novels, poems, and journalism, was met with resistance from rabbis who viewed it as a desecration of the sacred language. While some rabbinical authorities did support the development of Hebrew as a common vernacular, they did so on the basis of nationalistic ideas, rather than on the basis of Jewish tradition. Eliezer Ben Yehuda, a key figure in the revival, envisioned Hebrew as serving a "national spirit" and cultural renaissance in the Land of Israel.

=== Hebrew during the Haskalah ===
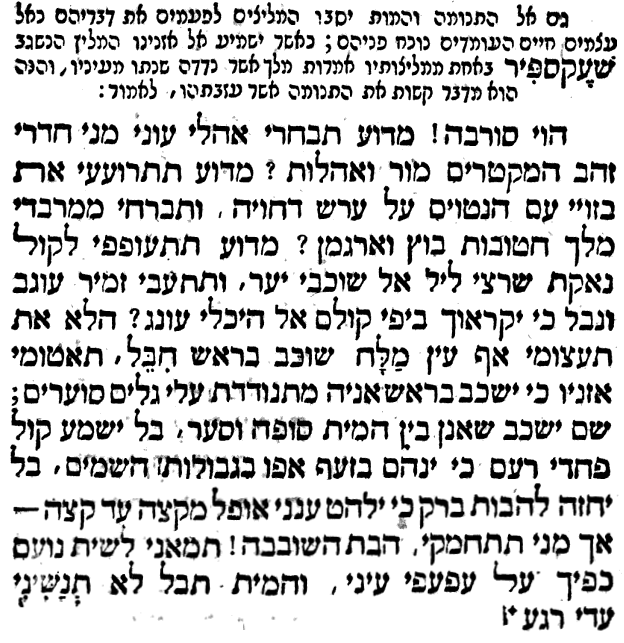
First known translation of Shakespeare to Hebrew by Solomon Löwishn, 1816. The "Are at this hour asleep!" monologue from Henry IV, Part 2.

A preceding process to the revival of literary Hebrew took place during the Haskalah, the Jewish movement paralleling the secular Enlightenment. Members of this movement, called maskilim (משכילים), who sought to distance themselves from Rabbinic Judaism, decided that Hebrew, specifically Biblical Hebrew, was deserving of fine literature. They considered Mishnaic Hebrew and other varieties of Hebrew to be defective and unfit for writing. Particularly influential on the movement was early 18th century Italian rabbi Moshe Chaim Luzzatto. Writing poetry and drama in a pure, Biblical style of Hebrew, he was greatly admired by the maskillim who deemed him the founder of modern Hebrew literature.

The Haskalah-era literature written in Hebrew based itself upon two central principles: Purism and flowery language. Purism was a principle that dictated that all words used should be of biblical origin (even if the meaning was not biblical). The principle of flowery language was based on bringing full verses and expressions as they were from the Tanakh, and the more flowery a verse was, the more quality it was said to possess. Another linguistic trait thought to increase a text's prestige was the use of hapax legomena, words appearing only once in the text.

But while it was easy to write stories taking place in the biblical period and dealing with biblical topics, Haskalah-era writers began to find it more and more difficult to write about contemporary topics. This was due mostly to the lack of a broad and modern vocabulary, meaning translating books about science and mathematics or European literature was difficult. Although an earlier, little known attempt at scientific writing was made when Israel Wolf Sperling translated Jules Verne's Twenty Thousand Leagues Under the Seas and Journey to the Center of the Earth in 1877 and 1878, this barrier was breached with more lasting effect in the 1880s by a writer named Mendele Mocher Sfarim.

Another difficulty faced by Haskalah Hebrew writers was that the audience was exclusively male with profound study background, which meant that women and the less educated men were pushed against reading Hebrew by reading Yiddish literature, which led a number of writers to write in Yiddish to find audiences.

=== Hebrew writers and educators ===
==== Mendele Mocher Sfarim ====
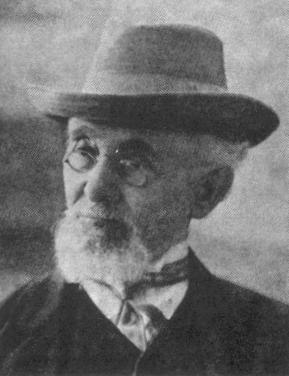
Mendele Mocher Sfarim

Ya'akov Abramovitch (1836–1917), is often known by the name of his main character, "Mendele Mocher Sfarim" (מוכר ספרים), meaning "bookseller". He began writing in Hebrew as a Haskalah writer and wrote according to all the conventions of Haskalah-era literature. At a certain point, he decided to write in Yiddish and caused a linguistic revolution, which was expressed in the widespread usage of Yiddish in Hebrew literature. After a long break he returned in 1886 to writing in Hebrew, but decided to ignore the rules of biblical Hebrew, and proponents of that style, like Abraham Mapu, and added into the vocabulary a host of words from the Rabbinic Age and the Middle Ages. His new fluid and varied style of Hebrew writing reflected the Yiddish spoken around him, while still retaining all the historical strata of Hebrew.

Mendele's language was considered a synthetic one, as it consisted of different echelons of Hebrew development and was not a direct continuation of a particular echelon. However, today, his language is often considered a continuation of Rabbinic Hebrew, especially grammatically. He was considered as the representative figure who provided great literatures to whichever language he was associated with.

==== Devorah Baron ====
Devorah Baron (also spelled Dvora Baron and Deborah Baron) (1887–1956), was a Hebrew writer who fascinated her readers with her unique use of the language in Eastern Europe, which was dominated by Yiddish speakers. Her early writings mostly involve the feminine Yiddish traditions, and she worked on more feminist topics in her later writings. The topics were mostly divided into two sorts: (1) the marginalization of female in the religious and family life; (2) the tension between men and women, and between generation to generation.

==== Other figures ====
See also Robert Alter, and his book The Invention of Hebrew Prose, who has done significant work on modern Hebrew literature and the context that enabled the language to revive itself via creative writing. The book has a large section on Abramovitch. Yael S. Feldman also gives a short overview of Mendele and his milieu in her book Modernism and Cultural Transfer. She notes the influence of Yiddish on his Hebrew, and traces this language interaction to Gabriel Preil, the last Haskalah poet of America. Eventually, writers like Yosef Haim Brenner would break from Mendele's style, and utilize more experimental techniques.

In his book Great Hebrew Educators (גדולי חינון בעמנו, Rubin Mass Publishers, Jerusalem, 1964), Zevi Scharfstein described the work of Maharal of Prague, Naphtali Hirz Wessely (Weisel), R. Hayyim of Volozhin, R. Naftali Zvi Yehuda Berlin, R. Israel Salanter, R. Israel Meir Ha-Kohen (the Hafes Hayyim), Aaron Kahnstam, Shalom Jonah Tscharno, Simha Hayyim Vilkomitz, Yishaq Epstein, David Yellin, Samson Benderly, Nisson Touroff, Sarah Schenirer, Yehiel Halperin, H. A. Friedland, and Janusz Korczak as significant contributors to the movement.

=== Continuation of the literary revival ===
Mendele's style was excitedly adopted by contemporary writers and spread quickly. It was also expanded into additional fields: Ahad Ha'am wrote an article in 1889 using the style entitled "This is not the Way", and Haim Nahman Bialik expanded it into poetry with his poem "To the Bird" of the same year. Additionally, great efforts were taken to write scientific books in Hebrew, for which the vocabulary of scientific and technical terms was greatly increased. At the same time, Europe saw the rise of Hebrew language newspapers and magazines, while even sessions and discussions of Zionist groups were conducted and transcribed in Hebrew. In addition, poets and writers such as David Frischmann and Shaul Tchernichovsky began avidly translating European works into Hebrew, from the Finnish epic the Kalevala to works by Molière, Goethe, Shakespeare, Homer, Byron, Lermontov, and Aeschylus. At the same time, writers like Micah Yosef Berdichevsky and Uri Nissan Gnessin began to write complex works of short fiction and novels in Hebrew, using the language to express psychological realism and interiority for the first time. As Hebrew poets and writers began arriving in Palestine armed with the new literary language, they exerted a certain amount of influence on the development of spoken Hebrew as well.

== Revival of spoken Hebrew ==
=== Eliezer Ben-Yehuda ===
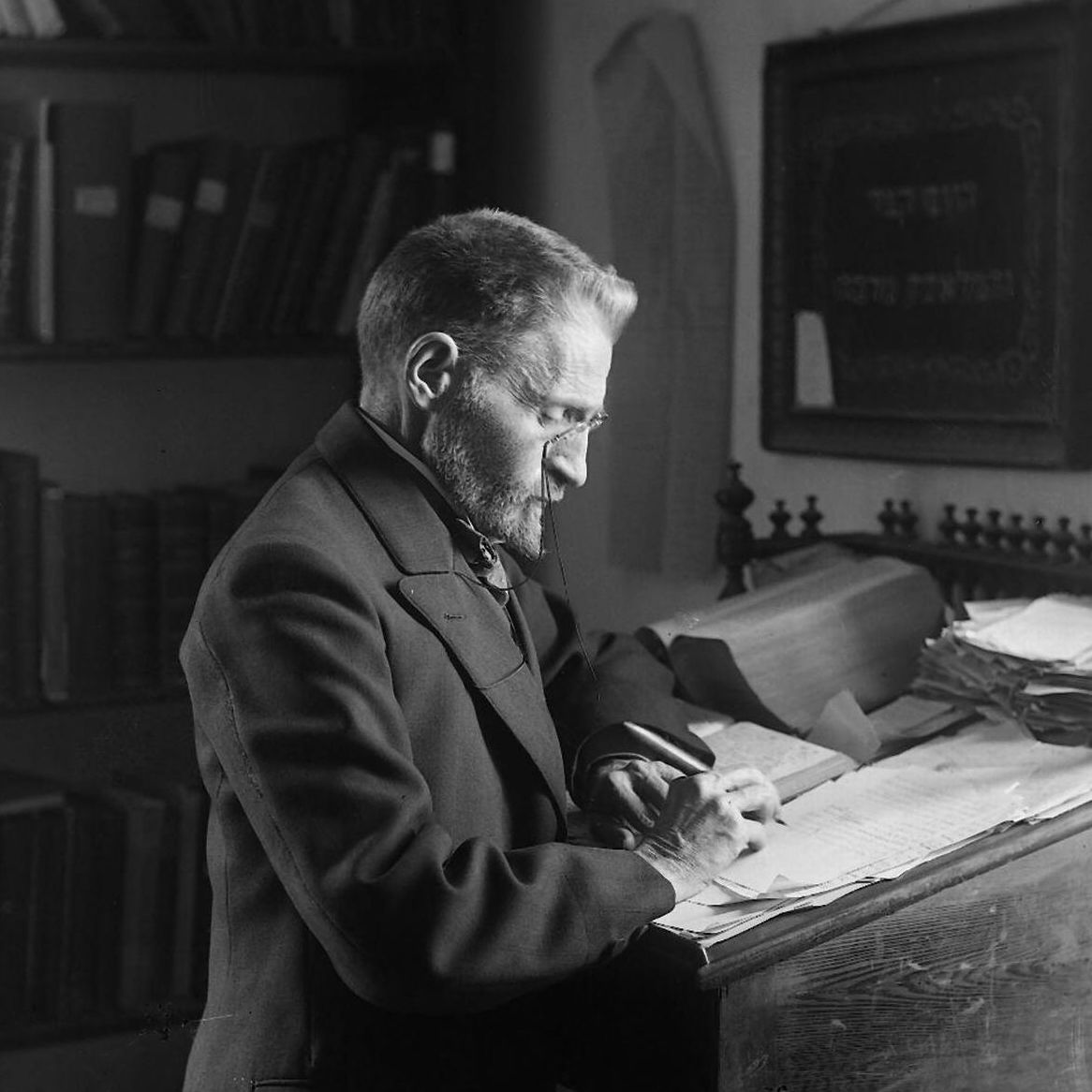
Eliezer Ben-Yehuda, working

Jewish communities with different colloquial languages had used Hebrew to communicate with each other across Europe and the Near East since the Middle Ages. The use of Hebrew enabled Jews to flourish in international trade throughout Europe and Asia during the Middle Ages. In Jewish communities that existed throughout Europe, the Middle East, North Africa, and India, Jewish merchants knew enough Hebrew to communicate, and thus had a much easier time trading with each other than non-Jews had trading internationally due to the language barrier. As Jews in Palestine spoke a variety of languages such as Arabic, Judaeo-Spanish, Yiddish, and French, inter-communal affairs that required verbal communication were handled in a modified form of Medieval Hebrew. Hebrew was used by Jews from different linguistic backgrounds in marketplaces in Jerusalem since at least the early 19th century.

Eliezer Ben-Yehuda (1858–1922) (אליעזר בן יהודה) is often regarded as the "reviver of the Hebrew language" ("מחיה השפה העברית"): he was the first to raise the concept of reviving Hebrew, to publish articles in newspapers on the topic, and he initiated the project known as the Ben-Yehuda Dictionary. However, what finally brought about the revitalization of Hebrew were developments in the settlements of the First Aliyah and the Second Aliyah. The first Hebrew schools were established in these settlements, Hebrew increasingly became a spoken language of daily affairs, and finally became a systematic and national language. Yet Ben-Yehuda's fame and notoriety stems from his initiation and symbolic leadership of the Hebrew revival.

Ben-Yehuda's main innovation in the revival of the Hebrew language lies in his having invented many new words to denote objects unknown in Jewish antiquity, or that had long been forgotten in their original Hebrew usage and context. He invented words such as ḥatzil (חציל) for an eggplant (aubergine) [adapted from Arabic ḥayṣal (حَيْصَل)] and ḥashmal (חשמל) [adapted from Akkadian elmešu] for electricity, although the latter word (ḥashmal), found in the Book of Ezekiel, chapter 1, has been explained by Rabbi Yehuda in the 1st-century CE as meaning "fiery creatures who speak."

As no Hebrew equivalent could be found for the names of certain produce native to the New World, new Hebrew words were devised for them. For example, maize and tomato were called tiras (תירס) and ʿagvaniyyah (עגבניה), respectively. The former word derives from the name of a son of Japheth (Ṯīrās) listed in Genesis 10 who was sometimes identified with the Turkish people, who have been traditionally considered as the main source of distribution of maize in Europe. The latter word was calqued from the German Liebesapfel (literally “love apple”), from the triconsonantal Hebrew root ע־ג־ב meaning lust. The new name, suggested by Yechiel Michel Pines, was rejected by Ben-Yehuda, who thought it too vulgar, suggesting instead that it be called badūrah. Eventually the name ʿagvaniyyah supplanted the other name.

Sometimes, old Hebrew words took on different meanings altogether. For example, the Hebrew word kǝvīš (כביש), which now denotes a "street" or a "road," is actually an Aramaic adjective meaning "trodden down; blazed", rather than a common noun. It was originally used to describe "a blazed trail". In what most rabbis view as an error, Ben-Yehuda is accredited with introducing the new Hebrew word ribah (ריבה) for "confiture; marmalade", believing it to be derived from the lexical root reḇaḇ, and related to the Arabic word murabba (jam; fruit conserves; marmalade). He also invented the word tapuz (תפוז) for the citrus fruit orange, which is a combination of tapuaḥ (apple) + zahav (gold), or "golden apple".

The word tirosh (תירוש), mentioned 38 times in the Hebrew Bible, is now widely used in Modern Hebrew to signify "grape-juice", although in its original usage, it is merely a synonym for vintage wine.

=== Three stages of revival ===
The revival of spoken Hebrew can be separated into three stages, which are concurrent with (1) the First Aliyah, (2) the Second Aliyah, and (3) the British Mandate period. In the first period, the activity centered on Hebrew schools in the Settlements and in the Pure Language Society; in the second period, Hebrew was used in assembly meetings and public activities; and in the third period, it became the language used by the Yishuv, the Jewish population during the Mandate Period, for general purposes. At this stage, Hebrew possessed both spoken and written forms, and its importance was reflected in the official status of Hebrew during the British Mandate. All of the stages were characterized by the establishment of many organizations that took an active and ideological part in Hebrew activities. This resulted in the establishment of Hebrew high schools (גימנסיות), the Hebrew University, the Jewish Legion, the Histadrut labor organization, and in Tel Aviv, which has been called the first Hebrew city.

=== Hebrew and Yiddish ===
Throughout all periods, Hebrew signified for both its proponents and detractors the antithesis of Yiddish. Against the exilic Yiddish language stood revived Hebrew, the language of Zionism, of grassroots pioneers, and above all, of the transformation of the Jews into a Hebrew nation with its own land. Yiddish was degradingly referred to as a jargon, and its speakers encountered harsh opposition, which finally led to a "language war" between Yiddish and Hebrew.

Nonetheless, some linguists, such as Ghil'ad Zuckermann controversially assert that "Yiddish is a primary contributor to Israeli Hebrew because it was the mother tongue of the vast majority of language revivalists and first pioneers in Eretz Yisrael at the crucial period of the beginning of Israeli Hebrew". According to Zuckermann, although the revivalists wished to speak Hebrew with Semitic grammar and pronunciation, they could not avoid the Ashkenazi conventions arising from their European background. He argues that their attempt to deny their European roots, negate diasporism and avoid hybridity (as reflected in Yiddish) failed. "Had the language revivalists been Arabic-speaking Jews (e.g. from Morocco), Israeli Hebrew would have been a totally different language—both genetically and typologically, much more Semitic. The impact of the founder population on Israeli Hebrew is incomparable with that of later immigrants."

=== First Aliyah (1882–1903) ===
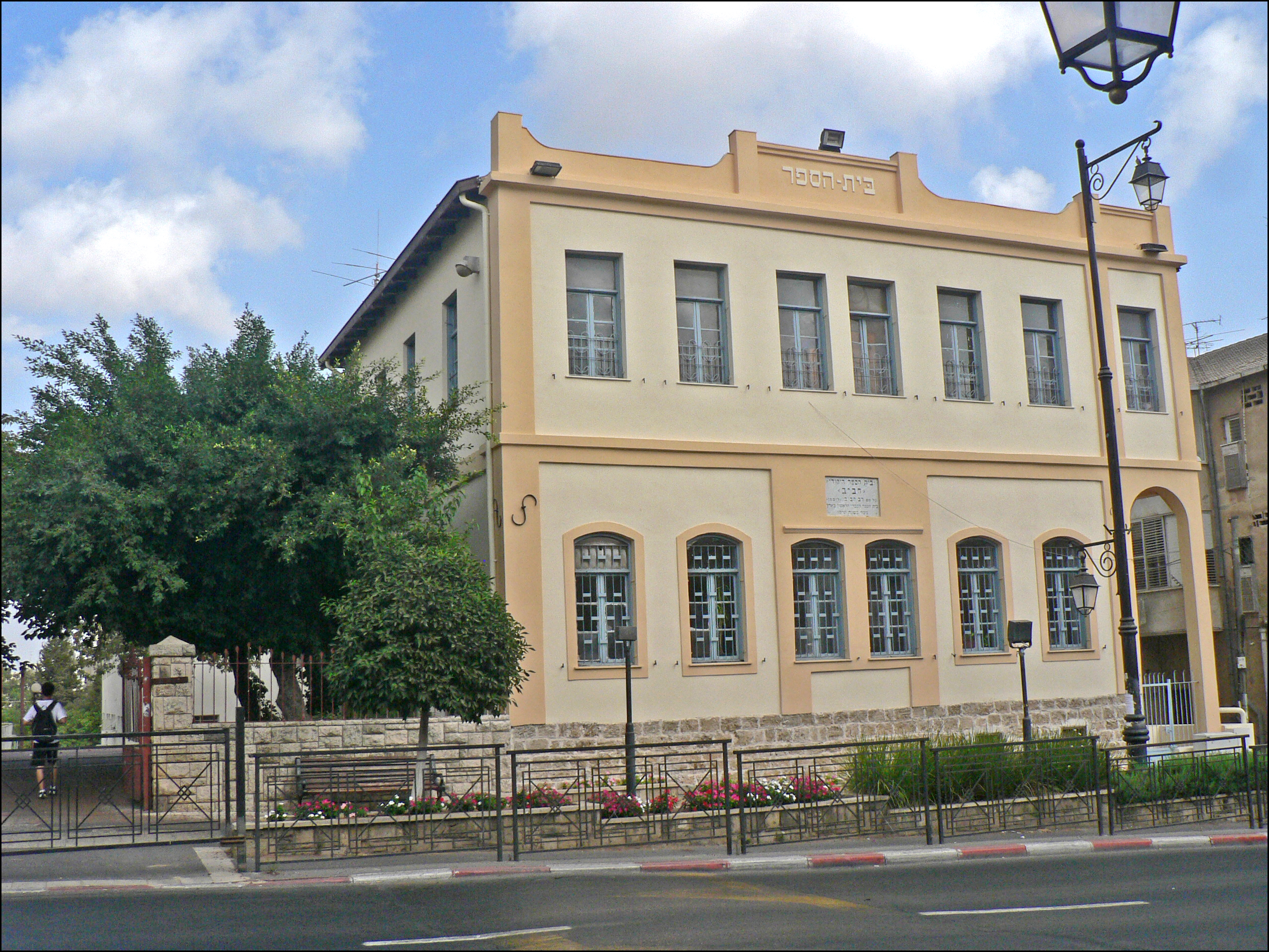
The Haviv elementary school

With the rise of Jewish nationalism in 19th-century Europe, Eliezer Ben-Yehuda was captivated by the innovative ideas of Zionism. At that time, it was believed that one of the criteria needed to define a nation worthy of national rights was its use of a common language spoken by both the society and the individual. On 13 October 1881, while in Paris, Ben-Yehuda began speaking Hebrew with friends in what is believed to be the first modern conversation using the language. Later that year, he made aliyah and came to live in Jerusalem.

In Jerusalem, Ben-Yehuda tried to garner support for the idea of speaking Hebrew. He determined that his family would only speak Hebrew, and raised his children to be native Hebrew speakers. His first child, a son named Itamar Ben-Avi, who was born in Jerusalem on 31 July 1882, became the first native speaker of Modern Hebrew. Ben-Yehuda attempted to convince other families to do so as well, founded associations for speaking Hebrew, began publishing the Hebrew newspaper HaZvi, and for a short while taught at Hebrew schools. Ben-Yehuda's efforts to persuade Jewish families to use only Hebrew in daily life at home met very limited success. According to Ben-Yehuda, ten years after his immigration to Palestine, there were only four families in Jerusalem that used Hebrew exclusively. According to the Hashkafa newspaper, there were ten such families in 1900. Ben-Yehuda briefly taught in Hebrew at a boys' school in Jerusalem after Nissim Behar, the school's principal, offered him a teaching job, and he accepted on condition that he be allowed to teach in Hebrew. Ben-Yehuda taught at the school for three months, using immersive methods to teach his students Hebrew. He inspired other teachers who continued to use his immersive methods to teach in Hebrew.

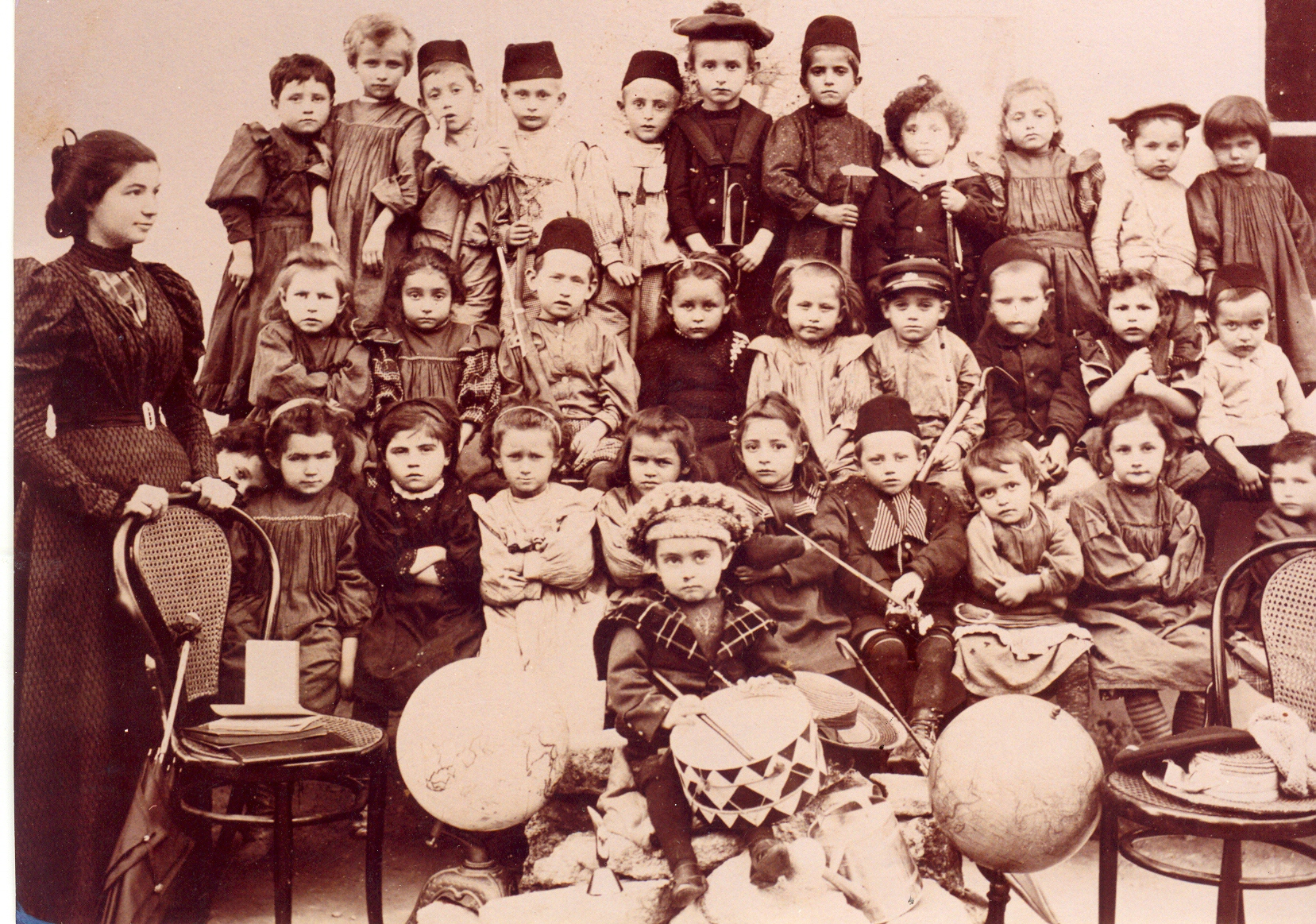
Eshter Shapira Ginzburg, left, founder of the first Hebrew-speaking kindergarten, with her class in Rishon LeZion, 1898.

At around the same time, widespread activity began in the moshavot, or agricultural settlements, of the First Aliyah, which was concentrated in the Hebrew schools. A Hebrew boarding school was established by Aryeh Leib Frumkin in 1884, where religious studies were conducted in Hebrew and students spoke Hebrew with their teachers and among themselves. In 1886, Haviv Elementary School was established in the Jewish settlement of Rishon LeZion, where the classes were taught exclusively in Hebrew. The Haviv school is recognized as the first Hebrew school of modern times. From the 1880s onward, schools in the agricultural settlements gradually began teaching general subjects in Hebrew. By 1889, in addition to Hebrew schools there were plays in Hebrew. In 1889, Israel Belkind opened a school in Jaffa that taught Hebrew and used it as the primary language of instruction. It survived for three years. The Literature Council, which was based on the Clear Language Society was founded in 1890 to experiment in the municipal and rural schools. It showed the possibility to make Hebrew the only language in the settlement. At this point, progress was slow, and it encountered many difficulties: parents were opposed to their children learning in an impractical language, useless in higher education; the four-year schools for farmers' children were not of a high caliber; and a great lack of linguistic means for teaching Hebrew plus the lack of words to describe day-to-day activities, not to mention the absence of Hebrew schoolbooks. Added to these, there was no agreement on which accent to use, as some teachers taught Ashkenazi Hebrew while others taught Sephardi Hebrew.

In 1889, Ben-Yehuda, together with rabbis Yaakov Meir and Chaim Hirschensohn and educator Chaim Kalmi, founded the Clear Language Society, with the goal of teaching Hebrew. The company taught Hebrew and encouraged Hebrew education in schools, heders, and yeshivas. Initially, it hired Hebrew-speaking women to teach Jewish women and girls spoken and written Hebrew. In 1890, the company established the Hebrew Language Committee, which coined new Hebrew words for everyday use and for a wide variety of modern uses and encouraged the use of grammatically correct Hebrew. Although the organization collapsed in 1891, the Hebrew Language Committee continued to function. It published books, dictionaries, bulletins, and periodicals, inventing thousands of new words. The Hebrew Language Committee continued to function until 1953, when it was succeeded by the Academy of the Hebrew Language.

A Hebrew boys' school opened in Jaffa in 1893, followed by a Hebrew girls' school. Although some subjects were taught in French, Hebrew was the primary language of instruction. Over the next decade, the girls' school became a major center of Hebrew education and activism. In 1898, the first Hebrew kindergarten opened in Rishon LeZion. It was followed by a second one in Jerusalem in 1903 and others elsewhere from 1904.

In 1903, the Union of Hebrew Teachers was founded, and sixty educators participated in its inaugural assembly. Though not extremely impressive from a quantitative viewpoint, the Hebrew school program did create a nucleus of a few hundred fluent Hebrew speakers and proved that Hebrew could be used in the day-to-day context.

=== Second Aliyah (1904–1914) ===
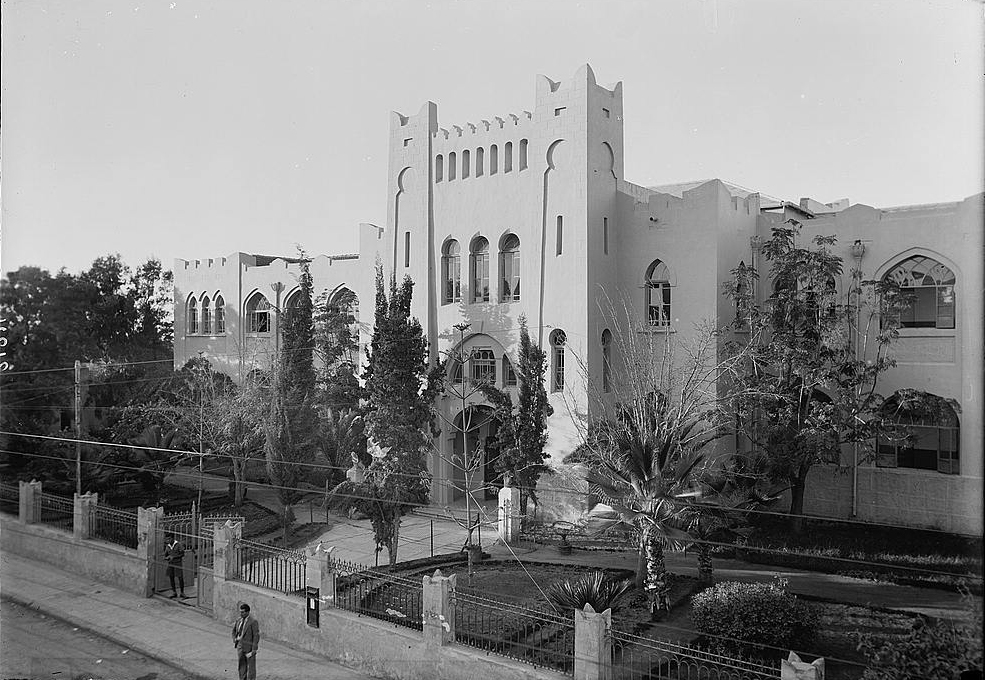
The Herzliya Hebrew Gymnasium

As the Second Aliyah began, Hebrew usage began to break out of the family and school framework into the public venue. Motivated by an ideology of rejecting the Diaspora and its Yiddish culture, the members of the Second Aliyah established relatively closed-off social cells of young people with a common world view. In these social cells—mostly in the moshavot—Hebrew was used in all public assemblages. Though not spoken in all homes and private settings yet, Hebrew had secured its place as the exclusive language of assemblies, conferences, and discussions. Educated Second Aliyah members already were familiar with the literary Hebrew that had developed in Europe, and they identified with the notion that Hebrew could serve as an impetus for the national existence for the Jewish people in Israel. This group was joined by the aforementioned graduates of Hebrew schools, who had already begun to raise native-born speakers of Hebrew in their families. During this period, the World Zionist Congress also adopted Hebrew as its official language.

Hebrew education continued to expand as the number of schools which taught in Hebrew grew. The number of Hebrew kindergartens continued to grow. In 1905, Yehuda Leib and Fania Matman-Cohen, a couple of educators, began teaching the first high school classes in Hebrew in their apartment in Jaffa. Hebrew teachers recreated the Hebrew Language Committee, which began to determine uniform linguistic rules, as opposed to the disjointed ones that had arisen previously. The Council declared as its mission "to prepare the Hebrew language for use as a spoken language in all affairs of life," formulated rules of pronunciation and grammar, and offered new words for use in schools and by the general public.

The widespread production of Hebrew schoolbooks also began, and Mother Goose-style rhymes were written for children. During the first decade of 20th century, Epstein's and Wilkomitz's Hebrew education, which restricted the children from speaking Yiddish not only in school but also at home and on the street, made progress toward wider use of Hebrew. The first native speakers of Hebrew, who had mainly learned it in the Hebrew schools of the First Aliyah period and came to speak it as their primary language, reached adulthood during this time. Aside from rare exceptions who had been born prior such as Itamar Ben-Avi, the first generation of children who acquired Modern Hebrew as native speakers at home from their parents rather than mainly learning it at school were born during this decade, to parents who had attended the Hebrew schools of the First Aliyah period. In addition, many of the Jewish immigrants during this period had reasonable Hebrew reading proficiency acquired from their education prior to arriving in the country. Most still learned it as a second language. Due to the growth of the number of native speakers and proficiency among second-language speakers, the Hebrew press was able to grow. During this period, it greatly increased in popularity and circulation. In 1912, it was observed that there was hardly a young Jew in the country who could not read a Hebrew newspaper.

In 1909, the first Hebrew city, Tel Aviv, was established. In its streets and in cafes, Hebrew was already widely spoken. The entire administration of the city was carried out in Hebrew, and new olim or those not yet speaking Hebrew were forced to speak in Hebrew. Street signs and public announcements were written in Hebrew. A new building for the Herzliya Hebrew Gymnasium, a continuation of the first Hebrew high school established by the Matman-Cohens, was built in the city that same year.

The pinnacle of Hebrew's development during this period came in 1913, in the so-called "War of the Languages". The Company for Aiding German Jews, then planning the establishment of a school for engineers (first known as the Technikum and for which construction had begun in 1912), insisted that German should be its language of instruction, arguing among other things that German possessed an extensive scientific and technical vocabulary while a parallel vocabulary drawn from Hebrew would need to be created from scratch, often using calques or translations of terms anyway. Substantial unanimity of opinion in the Yishuv ran against this proposal, which was defeated, leading to the founding of Israel's foremost institute of technology, the Technion, with a curriculum taught in Hebrew. This incident is seen as a watershed marking the transformation of Hebrew into the official language of the Yishuv.

Also in 1913, the Language Committee voted to establish the official pronunciation of Hebrew - a pronunciation loosely based on the Hebrew pronunciation of Sephardic communities because it sounded more "authentic" to their ears than the Ashkenazic pronunciation of European Jewish communities.

As a greater number of children passed through Hebrew language schools, the number of people who spoke Hebrew as their first language grew in addition to those who learned it as a second language. As the number of people using Hebrew increased, so did the demand for Hebrew reading materials and entertainment such as books, newspapers, and plays. In a census of the Jewish population of Palestine undertaken from 1916 to 1918, which recorded the population as 85,000, some 34,000 people, or 40% of the Jewish population, were reported to use Hebrew as their first or main daily language. Among children the figure was 54%. In Tel Aviv and Zionist pioneering communities, the figure was as high as 77%. The Jewish communities of the holy cities of Hebron, Safed, and Tiberias had largely avoided adopting Hebrew, with just 3% of children in these communities being Hebrew speakers. However, this survey is known to be flawed, as it excluded many Jews displaced from Palestine during World War I and did not poll the Jews of Jerusalem on Hebrew use.

=== Mandate period (1919–1948) ===
After World War I, when Palestine came under British rule, first under the Occupied Enemy Territory Administration and then under the Mandate for Palestine, Hebrew continued to develop as the main language of the Yishuv, or Jewish population of Palestine. It was legislated under the Mandate that English, Hebrew, and Arabic would be the official spoken languages of Palestine. In 1919, a centralized Jewish school system in which the language of instruction was Hebrew was established. As the Yishuv grew, adult immigrants arriving from the diaspora did not speak Hebrew as a mother tongue and learned it as a second language either prior to their immigration or in Palestine, while their children picked up Hebrew as their native language. At this time, the use of Hebrew as the lingua franca of the Yishuv was already a fait accompli, and the revival process was no longer a process of creation, but a process of expansion. In Tel Aviv, the Battalion of the Defenders of the Language was established, which worked to enforce Hebrew use. Jews who were overheard speaking other languages on the street were admonished: "Jew, speak Hebrew" (Hebrew: יהודי, דבר עברית, romanized: Yehudi, daber ivrit), or, more alliteratively, "Hebrew [man], speak Hebrew" (Hebrew: עברי, דבר עברית, romanized: Ivri, daber ivrit) was a campaign initiated by Ben-Yehuda's son, Itamar Ben-Avi.

The Academy of Hebrew Language focused on the structure and the spelling of Hebrew and prompted the issues about the further expansion of the use of Hebrew in Mandatory Palestine. The Academy worked with the Language College to publish the Ben-Sira in a scientific form.

The 1922 census of Palestine lists 80,396 Hebrew speakers in Mandatory Palestine (829 in the Southern District, 60,326 in Jerusalem-Jaffa, 706 in Samaria, and 18,625 in the Northern District), including 65,447 in municipal areas (32,341 in Jerusalem, 19,498 in Jaffa, 5,683 in Haifa, 44 in Gaza, 425 in Hebron, 15 in Nablus, 2,937 in Safad, 6 in Lydda, 43 in Nazareth, 27 in Ramleh, 4,280 in Tiberias, 13 in Acre, 21 in Tulkarem, 7 in Ramallah, 2 in Jenin, 86 in Beersheba, and 13 in Baisan).

=== State of Israel ===
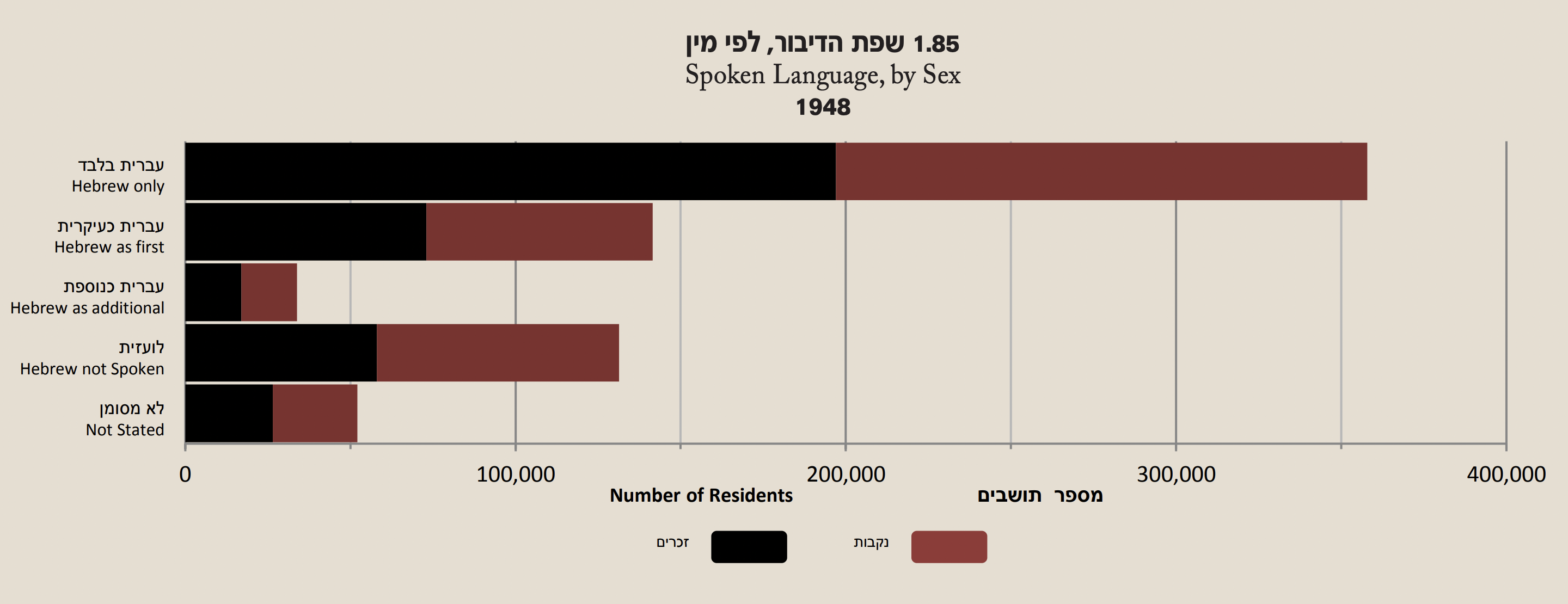
Spoken language and Hebrew proficiency by sex in Israel, according to the 1948 Census

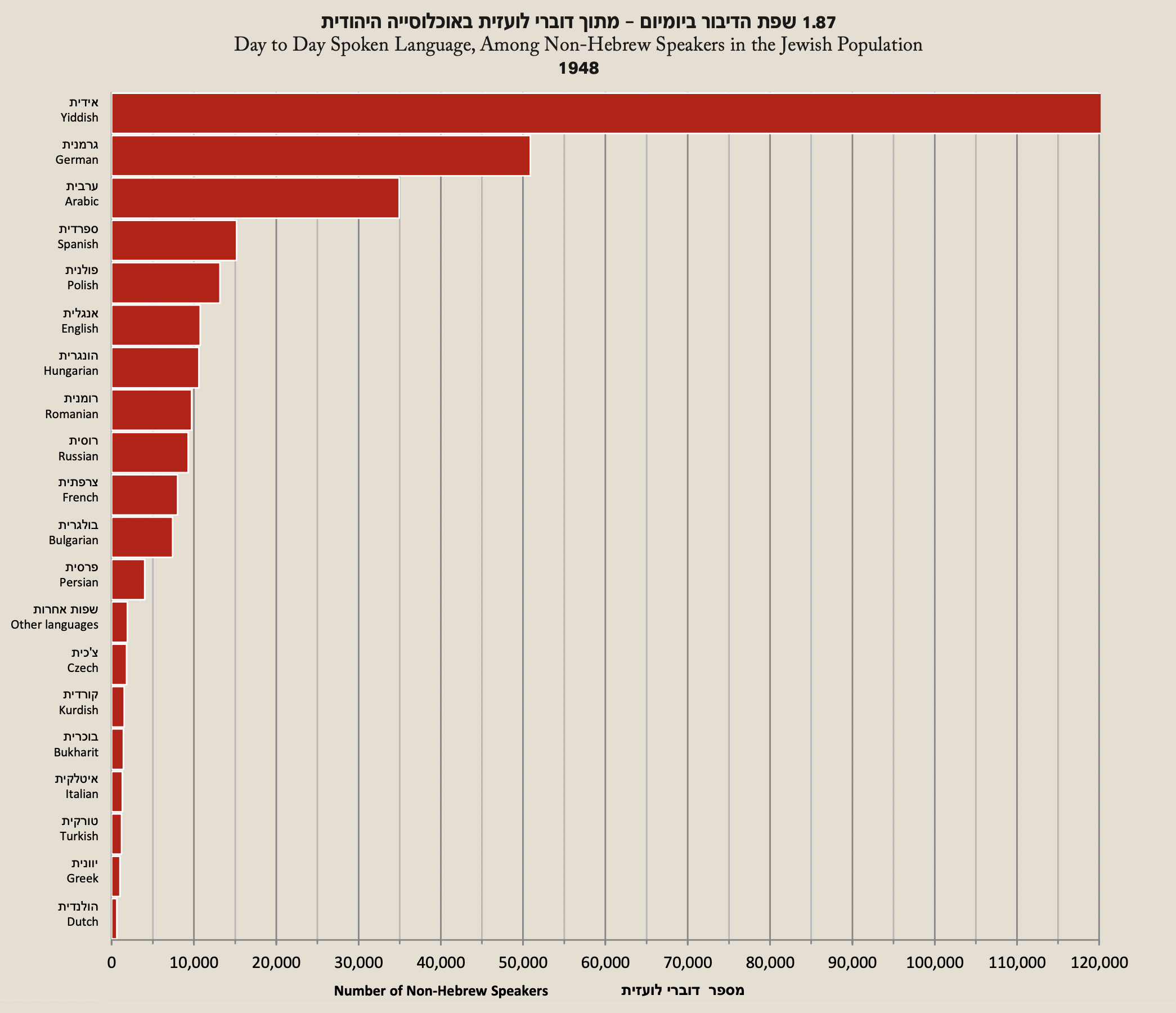
Israel: Day to Day Spoken Language, Among Non-Hebrew Speakers in the Jewish Population (1948)

By the time Israel was established in 1948, 80.9% of Jews who had been born in Palestine spoke Hebrew as their only language in daily life, and another 14.2% of Palestine-born Jews used it as a first among two or more languages. The small minority of Jews who had been born in Palestine but did not use Hebrew as a first language had mainly grown up before the development of the Hebrew school system.

Following Israeli independence, large waves of Jews came from Europe, North Africa, the Middle East, and other parts of the world. The Israeli population increased significantly, doubling within a short period of time. These immigrants spoke a variety of languages and had to be taught Hebrew. While immigrant children were expected to learn Hebrew through school, much effort was put into ensuring adults would learn the language. The institution of the ulpan, or intensive Hebrew-language school, was established to teach immigrants basic Hebrew language skills, and an ulpan course became a major feature of the experience of immigrating to Israel.

Young adult immigrants picked up much of their Hebrew through mandatory military service in the Israel Defense Forces, which aimed to teach soldiers Hebrew so they could function in the military and post-military civilian life. During the 1950s, Hebrew was taught in most military bases by recruited teachers and female soldiers. A 1952 order demanded that soldiers be taught Hebrew until they could converse freely on everyday matters, write a letter to their commander, understand a basic lecture, and read a vowelized newspaper. Soldiers also absorbed Hebrew through their regular service. Soldiers who were about to finish their service without a grasp of Hebrew deemed sufficient were sent to a special Hebrew school founded by the army for the last three months of their service. Immigrants from Arab countries tended to pick up Hebrew faster than European immigrants, due to Arabic being a Semitic language like Hebrew.

In daily life, immigrants largely limited their use of Hebrew to when they needed to, most often in their working lives, and to a somewhat lesser extent to satisfy cultural needs. They tended to use their native languages more when socializing and interacting with family. In 1954, about 60% of the population reported the use of more than one language. The children of these immigrants tended to pick up Hebrew as their first language, while their parents' native languages were either used as second languages or lost to them altogether. Palestinian citizens of Israel also began learning Hebrew, as Hebrew lessons were introduced into Arab schools. In 1948, the study of Hebrew was made compulsory in Arab schools from the third grade to high school, though the general language of instruction remained Arabic. This created a situation in which the Palestinians who remained in Israel after the Nakba would continue to use Arabic as their native language while also becoming proficient in Hebrew.

Yiddish was also a common language among immigrants to Israel from Eastern Europe and the Yiddish as a cultural language and in daily use continued despite Israel's efforts to promote Hebrew as the common vernacular through having Hebrew as the language of instruction in schools. Many in the new state's administration denigrated Yiddish and enacted policies to promote Hebrew and remove resources from Yiddish-language cultural activities. A year after its establishment in 1948, the state of Israel banned Yiddish theater and periodicals under its legal powers to control material published and presented in foreign languages (with the important exception of poet Avrom Sutkever’s literary magazine Di goldene kayt).

== See also ==
- Hebrew literature
- Language revitalization
- Yiddish Renaissance

== Sources ==
- Rabkin, Yakov M. (2006). A Threat from Within: A Century of Jewish Opposition to Zionism. Fernwood Pub. ISBN 978-1-55266-171-0.
