= Dola Ben-Yehuda Wittmann =

First native speaker of Modern Hebrew (1902–2004)

Dola Ben‑Yehuda Wittmann (Hebrew: דולה בן-יהודה ויטמן; 12 July 1902 – 18 November 2004) was the daughter of Eliezer Ben-Yehuda, who was the driving spirit behind the revival of the Hebrew language in the modern era, and his second wife Hemda Ben-Yehuda. She, along with her siblings, were the first native speakers of Hebrew in modern times.

== Biography ==
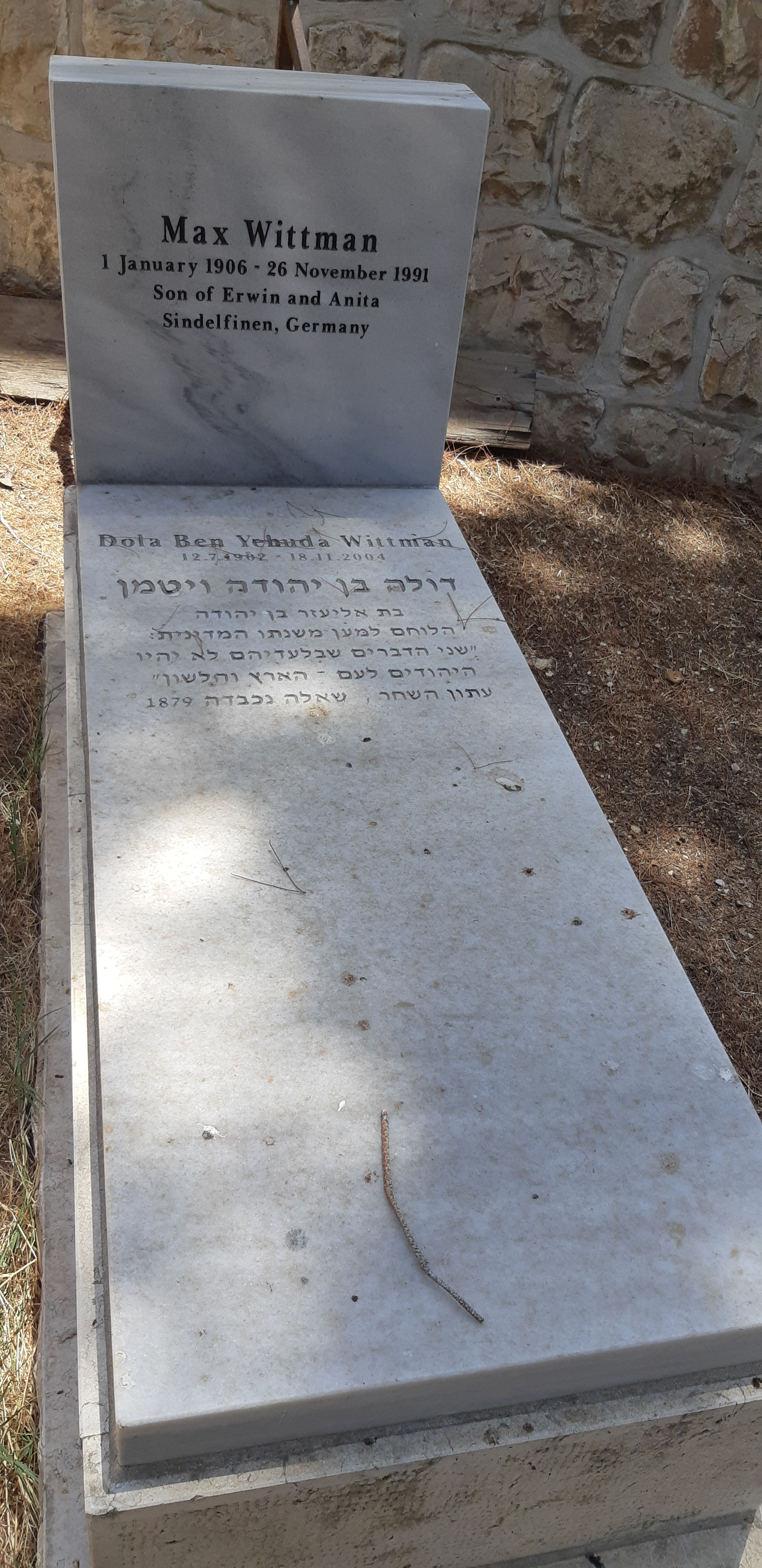
The grave of Max and Dola Wittmann

Dola was one of six children born to Eliezer Ben-Yehuda and his second wife Hemda. She had two living half-siblings by Ben-Yehuda's first wife (and Hemda's sister) Devora, including Itamar Ben-Avi.

In 1921, she married Max Wittmann, a German who became the first non-Jewish language activist in Palestine to found a Hebrew-only family with a native speaker of Hebrew. At the time of her death, she was the world's oldest native speaker of Modern Hebrew. Both Dola and her husband are buried in the Alliance Church International Cemetery in the German Colony neighborhood of Jerusalem.

== Relevance to linguistic scholarship on Hebrew ==
Dola's parents were the first people to raise a family in a strictly unilingual environment using only Modern Hebrew as a language for everyday use, thus producing the first native speakers of the language. Though it is common for modern linguists to have access to the last native speakers of dying languages, the opposite is rather exceptional. Modern Hebrew is the only known language to have afforded access to the first native speakers of a nascent "new" language, validating Eliezer Ben-Yehuda's claim that a "dead" and "holy" language such as Hebrew could be revived as a secular natively spoken language without the interference of religion and in spite of the opposition of the religious community. Dola survived her older brother by 60 years, well into a millennium in which Modern Hebrew had seven million speakers, including three million native speakers and many non-Jews.

Dola was a major contributor to the Dartmouth Jewish Sound Archive recording and wrote as well as performed the collection's introductory track.
