= Hovav =

Hovav may refer to:

- Hovav Sekulets (born 1986), Israeli singer better known as Hovi Star
- Gil Hovav (born 1962), Israeli TV presenter, culinary journalist, restaurant critic, and author
- Ramat Hovav, new official name Ne'ot Hovav, an industrial zone in southern Israel
