= Ehud Ben-Yehuda =

- אֵהוּד בֶּן־יְהוּדָה
- Born: November 27, 1897; Jerusalem, the Ottoman Empire
- Died: November 29, 1982 (aged 85); Jerusalem, Israel
- Years active: 1922 - 1982
- Notable work: Completion of Ben-Yehuda Dictionary
- Spouse: Dora Rosenfeld
- Children: Eliezer, Eliezra, Hemda
- Parents: Eliezer Ben-Yehuda (father); Hemda Ben-Yehuda (mother)

Ehud Shlomo Ben-Yehuda (November 27, 1897 – November 29, 1982) was an Israeli lexicographer, educator, police officer, hunter, and storyteller. He was the son of Eliezer Ben-Yehuda, the reviver of the Hebrew language, and continued his father's work by completing the publication of the Ben-Yehuda Dictionary.

== Early life and education ==
Born in Jerusalem to Eliezer and his second wife, Hemda, Ehud was their fourth child and the second to reach adulthood. He was among the first native speakers of modern Hebrew. Ehud attended the Lämel School in Jerusalem, continued his studies in Geneva, and later at an agricultural school in Germany. He also pursued agricultural studies in California.

Career

During World War I, while in Germany, Ehud volunteered for the German army and served as an aide to Franz von Papen when he was the German ambassador in Constantinople. In 1918, he was arrested and faced a military trial in Amman on charges of arms smuggling but was eventually acquitted. From 1919 to 1921, Ehud taught agriculture at the Mikveh Israel agricultural school and served as a government agriculture inspector in southern Palestine. Between 1925 and 1927, he worked as a police inspector in Jerusalem, Haifa, and Zikhron Ya'akov. Ehud founded the Association of Hebrew Hunters in Palestine, promoting the sport and operating a gun shop in Jerusalem. He was also an enthusiast of hunting dogs, serving as a trainer and chef.

Completion of the Ben-Yehuda Dictionary

After Eliezer Ben-Yehuda's death in December 1922, Ehud played a pivotal role in completing the monumental Ben-Yehuda Dictionary. He actively sought funding, edited, and published the remaining twelve volumes, collaborating with his mother, Hemda, and later with linguist Naftali Herz Tur-Sinai. Ehud traveled extensively to promote and distribute the dictionary, and in 1961, he published a pocket edition of the Hebrew-English Ben-Yehuda Dictionary.

He was fluent in Hebrew, English, Russian, German, and Arabic.

== Personal life ==
Ehud married Dora Rosenfeld and they had two daughters, Eliezra and Hemda (a professor of political science at Bar-Ilan University), and a son, Eliezer (a rabbi in the US). He died in November 1982 and was buried in the Ben-Yehuda family plot on the Mount of Olives in Jerusalem. His tombstone says: "Through his work, the Hebrew language dictionary was completed, and through his struggle, the dream 'Hebrew, speak Hebrew' was realized."
