= Beit Ben-Yehuda =

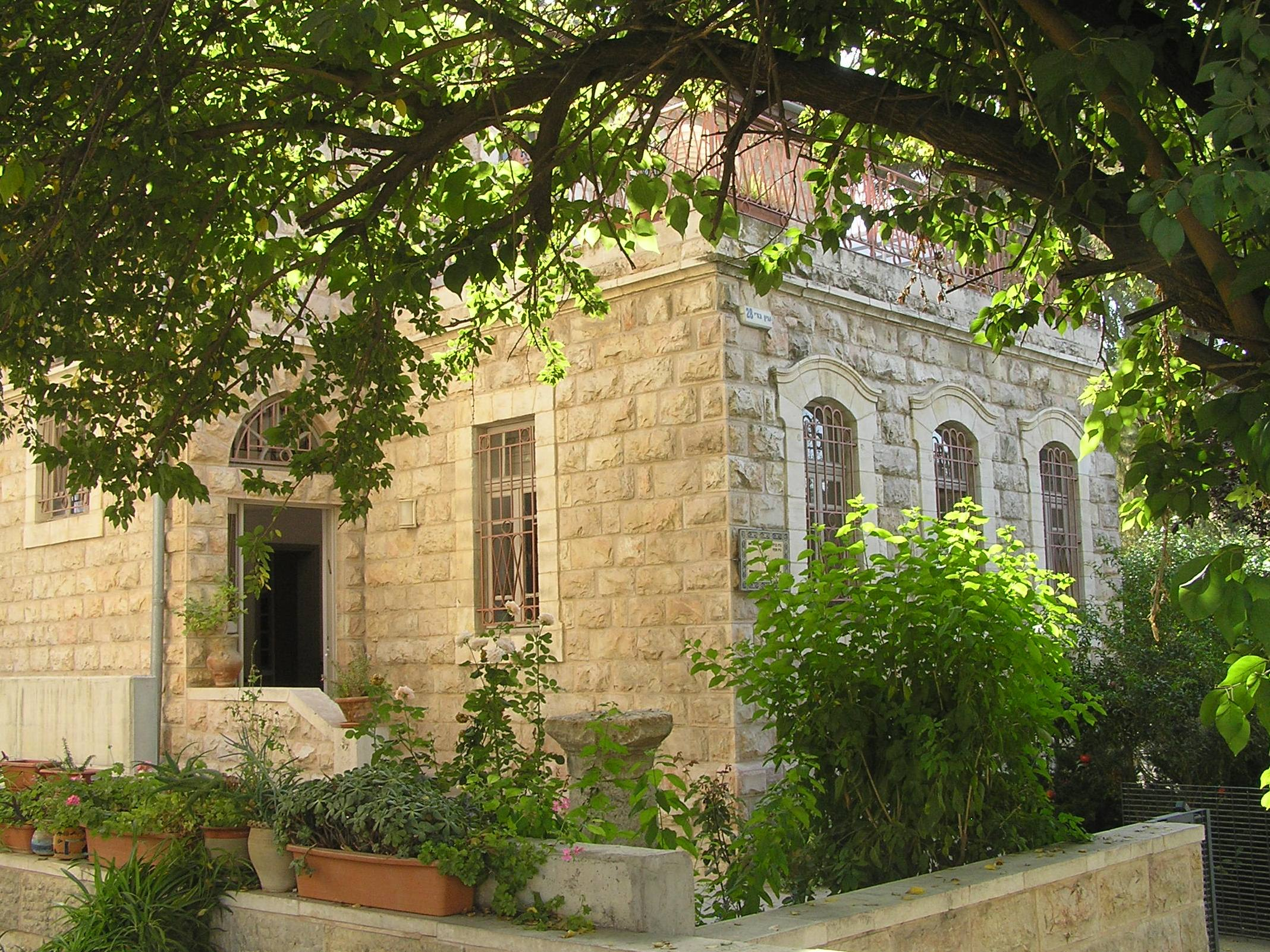
Beit Ben-Yehuda

Beit Ben-Yehuda is a historical home built in Arnona-Talpiot Neighborhood in Jerusalem for Eliezer Ben Yehuda, known as "the reviver of the Hebrew language".

== History ==
Eliezer died on December 16, 1922, a short time before the house was completed.

His wife Chemda lived in the house until her death in 1951. Over the years Chemda turned the place into a commemoration center of Ben-Yehuda's life achievement.

A few years later the family of Ben-Yehuda donated the house to the Municipality of Jerusalem.

In 1965 the municipality rented the house to private residents and in 1971 Jerusalem's former mayor Teddy Kollek decided to hand it over to Action Reconciliation Service for Peace (German: Aktion Sühnezeichen Friedensdienste), a volunteer organization based in Germany.

In 2004 a new wing was built in the backyard of the house in order to be used as a seminar center for the German volunteers.

The goal to establish a guesthouse that opens its doors for everyone and to create a place that is a cultural center for learning was set. With a focal point on German-Israeli relations they offer a variety of different seminars, workshops, lectures, language courses and other events on historical, sociological, political and cultural topics, such as German, Hebrew and Yiddish courses.

== See also ==
- International Youth Meeting Center in Oświęcim/Auschwitz
