= Eliezer Ben-Yehuda =

Jewish linguist and journalist (1858–1922)

- אֱלִיעֶזֶר בֶּן־יְהוּדָה
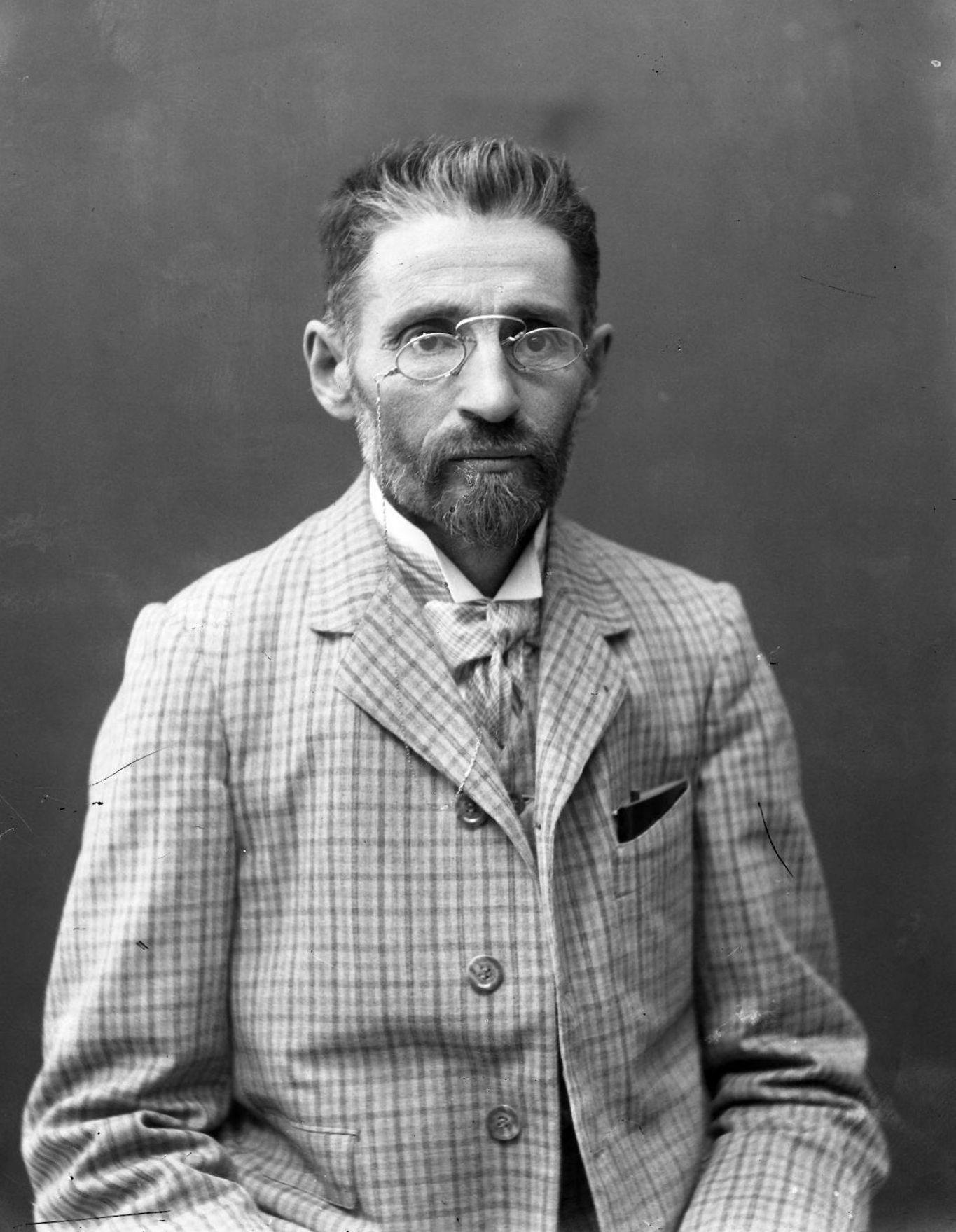
- Born: Eliezer Yitzhak Perlman; 7 January 1858; Luzhki, Vilna Governorate, Russian Empire (now Belarus)
- Died: 16 December 1922 (aged 64); Jerusalem, British Mandate for Palestine
- Resting place: Mount of Olives, Jerusalem; 31°46′42″N 35°14′38″E
- Education: Sorbonne University
- Occupations: Linguist; journalist
- Organization: HaZvi
- Known for: Reviving the Hebrew language
- Movement: Zionism
- Spouses: Devora Jonas (m. 1881; died 1891); Hemda Jonas (m. 1891)
- Children: Itamar Ben-Avi (with Devora); Dola Ben-Yehuda (with Hemda); Ehud Ben-Yehuda (with Hemda)
- Relatives: Drora Ben Avi (granddaughter); Gil Hovav (great-grandson)

Eliezer Ben‑Yehuda (Note: Hebrew: אֱלִיעֶזֶר בֶּן־יְהוּדָה, lit. 'Eliezer, son of Judah', pronounced [ʔeliˈʔezer ben jehuˈda].) (born Eliezer Yitzhak Perlman; (Note: Yiddish: אליעזר יצחק פערלמאן.) 7 January 1858 – 16 December 1922) was a Jewish linguist, lexicographer, and journalist who immigrated to Jerusalem in 1881, when the Ottoman Empire ruled it. He is renowned as the lexicographer of the first Hebrew dictionary and also as the editor of Jerusalem-based HaZvi, one of the first Hebrew newspapers published in Mandatory Palestine. Ben-Yehuda was the primary driving force behind the revival of the Hebrew language.

== Early life and education ==
Eliezer Yitzhak Perlman (later Eliezer Ben-Yehuda) was born in Luzhki in the Vilna Governorate of the Russian Empire (now Vitebsk Oblast, Belarus) to Yehuda Leib and Tzipora Perlman, who were Chabad hasidim. His native language was Yiddish. He was one of five siblings. He attended a Jewish elementary school (a cheder) where he studied Hebrew and the Hebrew Bible from the age of three, as was customary among the Jews of Eastern Europe. His father died during his childhood and his mother, lacking the financial means to support five children, sent him to live with his uncle David Wolfson, who was more financially secure. By the age of twelve, he had read large portions of the Torah, Mishna, and Talmud. His mother and uncle hoped he would become a rabbi, and after his bar mitzvah he was sent to a yeshiva. There he was exposed to the Hebrew of the Jewish Enlightenment, which included some secular writings. The first secular Hebrew book he read was a translation of Robinson Crusoe. Later, he learned French, German, and Russian, and was sent to Dünaburg for further education. Reading the Hebrew-language newspaper HaShahar, he became acquainted with the early movement of Zionism.

Upon graduation in 1877, Ben-Yehuda went to Paris for four years. While there, he studied various subjects at the Sorbonne University—including the history and politics of the Middle East. It was in Paris that he met a Jew from Jerusalem, who spoke Hebrew with him. It was this conversation that convinced him that the revival of Hebrew as the language of a nation was feasible.

=== Immigration to Ottoman Palestine ===
In 1881 Ben-Yehuda joined the First Aliyah and immigrated to the Mutasarrifate of Jerusalem, then ruled by the Ottoman Empire, and settled in Jerusalem. He found a job teaching at the school of the Alliance Israélite Universelle. Motivated by the surrounding ideals of renovation and rejection of the diaspora lifestyle, Ben-Yehuda set out to develop a new language that could replace Yiddish and other regional dialects as a means of everyday communication between Jews who moved to Ottoman Palestine from various regions of the world. Ben-Yehuda regarded Hebrew and Zionism as symbiotic, writing, "the Hebrew language can live only if we revive the nation and return it to the fatherland."

== Revival of the Hebrew language ==
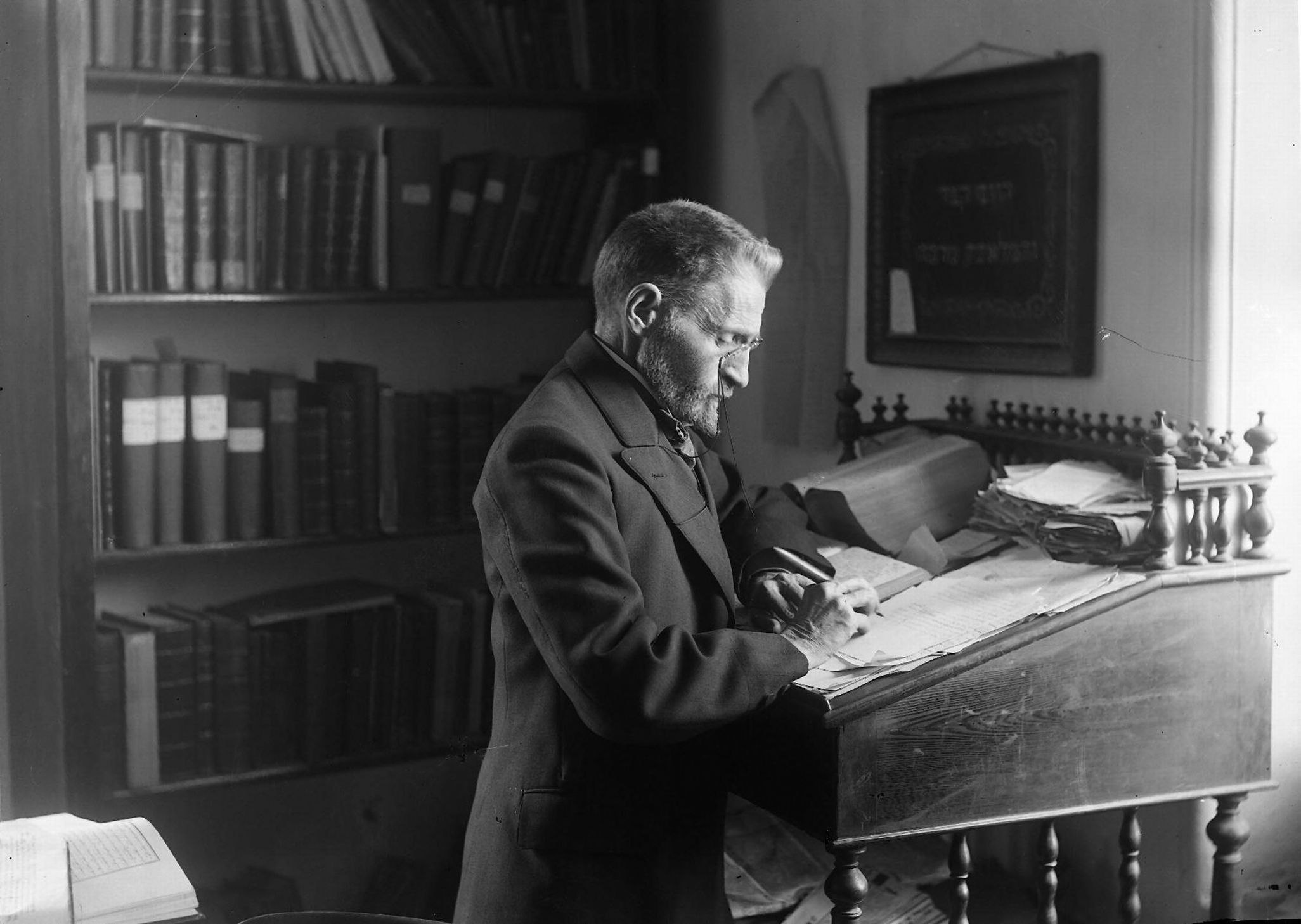
Ben-Yehuda working at his house in Talpiot, Jerusalem, c. 1918–1922

Before its modern spoken revival, Hebrew had remained in continuous use in Jewish liturgy, study, and writing, and Jewish travellers and merchants also used it in receipts, loan documents, and communication with far-away communities. For terms lacking in earlier Hebrew, Ben-Yehuda insisted with the Committee of the Hebrew Language that, to quote the Committee records, "In order to supplement the deficiencies of the Hebrew language, the Committee coins words according to the rules of grammar and linguistic analogy from Semitic roots: Aramaic and especially from Arabic roots."

Ben-Yehuda had argued for the settlement of the Land of Israel since his 1879 essay "A Burning Question", although in 1903 he, along with many members of the Second Aliyah, supported Theodor Herzl's Uganda Scheme proposal as a temporary refuge.

Ben‑Yehuda raised his son, Ben-Zion (meaning "son of Zion"), entirely in Hebrew. He did not allow his son to be exposed to other languages during childhood, and even berated his wife for singing a Russian lullaby. His son thus became the first native speaker of Hebrew in modern times. Ben‑Yehuda later raised his daughter, Dola, entirely in Hebrew as well.

=== Lexicography ===
Ben-Yehuda was a major figure in the establishment of the Committee of the Hebrew Language (Va'ad HaLashon), later the Academy of the Hebrew Language, an organization that still exists today. He was the initiator of the first modern Hebrew dictionary known as the Ben-Yehuda Dictionary and he became known as the "reviver" (המחיה) of the Hebrew language, despite opposition to some of the words he coined. Many of these words have become part of the language but others never caught on.

=== Opposition from Orthodox Jews ===
Ben-Yehuda was the editor of several Hebrew-language newspapers: HaZvi and Hashkafa. HaZvi was closed down for a year in the wake of opposition from Jerusalem's ultra-Orthodox community, which fiercely objected to the use of Hebrew, their holy tongue, for everyday conversation. In 1908, its name changed to HaOr, and it was shut down by the Ottoman government during World War I due its support for a homeland for the Jewish people in the Land of Israel/Palestine.

Many devoted Jews of the time did not appreciate Ben-Yehuda's efforts to resurrect the Hebrew language. They believed that Hebrew, which they learned as a biblical language, should not be used to discuss mundane and non-holy things. Others thought his son would grow up and become a "disabled idiot", and even Theodor Herzl declared, after meeting Ben-Yehuda, that the thought of Hebrew becoming the modern language of the Jews was ridiculous.

In December 1893, Ben-Yehuda and his father-in-law were imprisoned by the Ottoman authorities in Jerusalem following accusations by members of the Jewish community that they were inciting rebellion against the government.

== Personal life ==
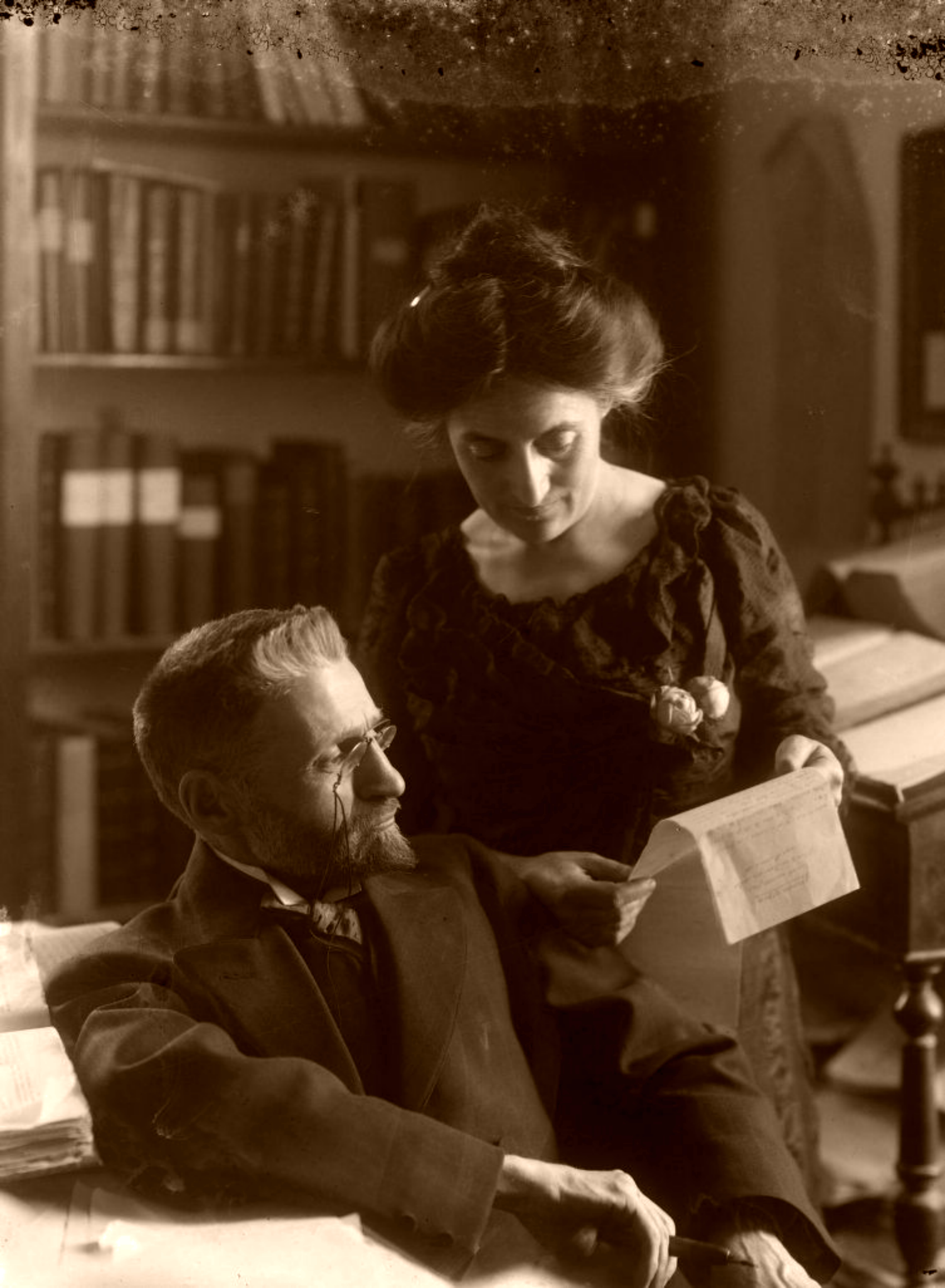
Ben-Yehuda and his wife Hemda Jonas, 1912

Ben-Yehuda was married twice, to two sisters. His first wife, Devora (née Jonas), died in 1891 of tuberculosis, leaving him with five small children.

Her final wish was that Eliezer marry her younger sister, Paula Beila. Soon after his wife Devora's death, three of his children died of diphtheria within a period of 10 days. Six months later, he married Paula, who took the Hebrew name "Hemda".

Ben-Yehuda's son, journalist Itamar Ben-Avi, is the father of radio station head Drora Ben Avi, who is in turn the mother of Ben-Yehuda's great-grandson Gil Hovav, a TV presenter, culinary journalist, restaurant critic, and author.

Hemda Ben-Yehuda became an accomplished journalist and author in her own right, ensuring the completion of the Hebrew dictionary in the decades after Eliezer's death, as well as mobilising fundraising and coordinating committees of scholars in both Israel and abroad.

== Death and legacy ==
In December 1922, Ben-Yehuda, 64, died of tuberculosis, from which he suffered most of his life. He was buried on the Mount of Olives in Jerusalem. His funeral was attended by 30,000 people.

Ben-Yehuda built a house for his family in the Talpiot neighborhood of Jerusalem, but died three months before it was completed. His wife Hemda lived there for close to thirty years. Ten years after her death, her son Ehud transferred the title of the house to the Jerusalem municipality for the purpose of creating a museum and study center. Eventually it was leased to a church group from Germany who established a center there for young German volunteers. The house is now a conference center and guesthouse run by the German organization Action Reconciliation Service for Peace (ARSP), which organizes workshops, seminars and Hebrew language ulpan programs.

Cecil Roth was quoted by historian Jack Fellman as having summed up Ben-Yehuda's contribution to the Hebrew language: "Before Ben‑Yehuda, Jews could speak Hebrew; after him, they did." There are no other examples of a natural language without any native speakers subsequently acquiring several million native speakers, and no other examples of a sacred language becoming a national language with millions of "first language" speakers.

== See also ==
- Beit Ben-Yehuda
- David Yudilovitz
- Ben-Yehuda Dictionary
