= International Youth Meeting Center in Oświęcim/Auschwitz =

Educational institution

Auschwitz as a place of memorial does not offer answers; it merely shocks people into asking questions — and especially the subversive questions. Perhaps this is its true role. But it can also (should also) be seen as a place of healing, through dialogue ... Over the last nineteen years, three independent educational centers have in fact been set up in the vicinity of the museum: first (in the 1980s) a German-Polish youth center, then a Catholic center, and most recently (in 2000) a Jewish center ... Collectively, the establishment of these centers means that Auschwitz is not only a site of mourning and meditation, a site of memory, but also a site of researching, learning, and encounter, interreligious or otherwise. The growth of these institutions hints at new strategies emerging for a long-term future.

—Jonathan Webber (2006)

The International Youth Meeting Center in Oświęcim/Auschwitz is an educational institution whose campus lies between the center of the Polish city of Oświęcim and the former German concentration camp of Auschwitz. More than one million persons, mostly Jewish and Polish, were murdered at Auschwitz during the Second World War (1939–1945). Proposed in 1971, the center was opened in 1986 following years of planning, negotiations, and fundraising. It seeks to "develop the understanding of National Socialism and its consequences, particularly among young Germans, through dialogue and encounter between people of different origins", and is particularly engaged with Germans and Poles, Christians and Jews. In 2010, the Center hosted more than 17,000 overnight stays by youth groups participating in its programs. Many young Germans and Austrians have held year-long voluntary positions at the Center that satisfy their civilian service (Zivildienst) responsibility. One of these, Robert Thalheim, wrote and directed the German-language dramatic film And Along Come Tourists (2007) that features the center and its activities.

The Polish and German names for the center are Międzynarodowy Dom Spotkań Młodzieży w Oświęcimiu and Internationale Jugendbegegnungsstätte in Oświęcim/Auschwitz, respectively; the two names are conjoined in the abbreviation MDSM/IJBS for the center.

== History ==
The idea for the construction of a youth meeting center in Poland came from Volker von Törne (1934–1980), who saw an opportunity for creating it following the signing of the 1970 Treaty of Warsaw between West Germany and Poland. von Törne was a poet and then business manager of the Action Reconciliation Service for Peace (ARSP), which is a private German organization (Aktion Sühnezeichen Friedensdienst) working towards reconciliation with countries and peoples harmed during German occupation in World War II. Following von Törne's death in 1980, Christoph Heubner led the project for ARSP. In a 1986 interview, Heubner explained the importance of placing the Center near Auschwitz, which "symbolized the lowest point in German-Polish history, the lowest point in Jewish-German relations, one of the lowest points in man's inhumanity to man. The motivation to speak with one another is greater there. The greater emotion opens people up more for dialogue than would be the case in Masuria [an area in northeast Poland] or in some sunny mountain meadow."

In the late 1970s and early 1980s the proposal was very controversial. The location of the buildings, the architecture of the project, the operations as well as the Polish partner for the ARSP were contentious issues. In 1978, Andreas Maislinger unsuccessfully approached President Rudolf Kirchschläger about Austrian support for the project.

The project received the support of many survivors of the concentration camps at Dachau, Stutthof, Buchenwald and Auschwitz, and by December 1985 a turning point was reached. Alfred Przybylski, former prisoner #471 at the Auschwitz camp and the representative of the Union of Polish Architects, supported by the plans drawn up by German architect Helmut Morlok, contributed decisively to the realization of the project.

After obtaining contributions of 4.6 million Deutschmarks ($2.1 million), sufficient for 2/3 of the construction costs, ground was finally broken in May 1986. The handoff of the initial buildings to the foundation that operates it was celebrated on 7 December 1986, which was the sixteenth anniversary of the signing of the Treaty of Warsaw. The entire building project was completed in October 1998. The center is primarily supported by the Polish municipality of Oświęcim and by the ARSP, which sponsors three such centers. In 2010, the Center hosted more than 17,000 overnight stays by youth groups participating in its programs.

The center has become well known in German-speaking Europe following release of the dramatic film Am Ende kommen Touristen (2007) (And Along Come Tourists), which was partly filmed at the center. The film was written and directed by Robert Thalheim. While the film's characters and story are fictional, in writing the screenplay Thalheim drew from his own experience as a German civilian service worker at the Center in 1996–97.

== Facilities ==
The center is on one bank of the Soła river, and consists of several pavilions laid out around a large garden. There is a forum, a multi-purpose room, a library, and four seminar rooms. There are about one hundred beds, as well as a campground and a sports field.

Katrin Buchholz has described the architecture as follows: "Modesty in construction and form, simplicity in the interior furnishings, ... the center of the campus is a meeting place that is open in all directions ... where all can move or loiter freely and unobserved, and in which one can find community but also security, as well as time and space to be alone."

== Programming ==
The Center sponsors activities of several types, including workshops to bring together groups of Polish and German students, seminars and development programs for adults and teachers, and exhibitions for general visitors. Groups using the Center typically stay for four or five days. In addition to visits to the remains of the concentration camps Auschwitz I, Auschwitz-Birkenau, and Auschwitz III-Monowitz, groups can plan excursions in the area, especially to the city of Kraków, and conversations can be arranged with experts on the major concerns of the center.

The center has been among the sites for the work of young German and Austrian citizens doing civilian service (Zivildienst) sponsored by the ARSP, the German Internationaler Bund, and by the Austrian Holocaust Memorial Service.

== See also ==
- Anne Frank Educational Centre (Frankfurt). A youth meeting center supported by the Anne Frank Foundation.
- Auschwitz-Birkenau State Museum. A museum and research institution associated with the Auschwitz camps.
- International Youth Meeting Centre in Krzyżowa. A second youth meeting center in Poland that is devoted to dialogue and reconciliation between Poland and Germany. The centre was founded after an historic 1989 meeting of Polish Prime Minister Tadeusz Mazowiecki and the German Federal Chancellor Helmut Kohl.
- International Youth Meeting Center in Israel. A second ARSP-sponsored youth meeting center in Israel.
- Oświęcim Synagogue. The 1913 synagogue was restored and re-opened in 2000; it serves the small local community as well as visitors. The synagogue is part of the Auschwitz Jewish Center (Centrum Żydowskie w Oświęcimiu), which also incorporates a museum and an education center.
