= Gil Hovav =

Israeli TV presenter and culinary critic (born 1962)

- גיל חובב
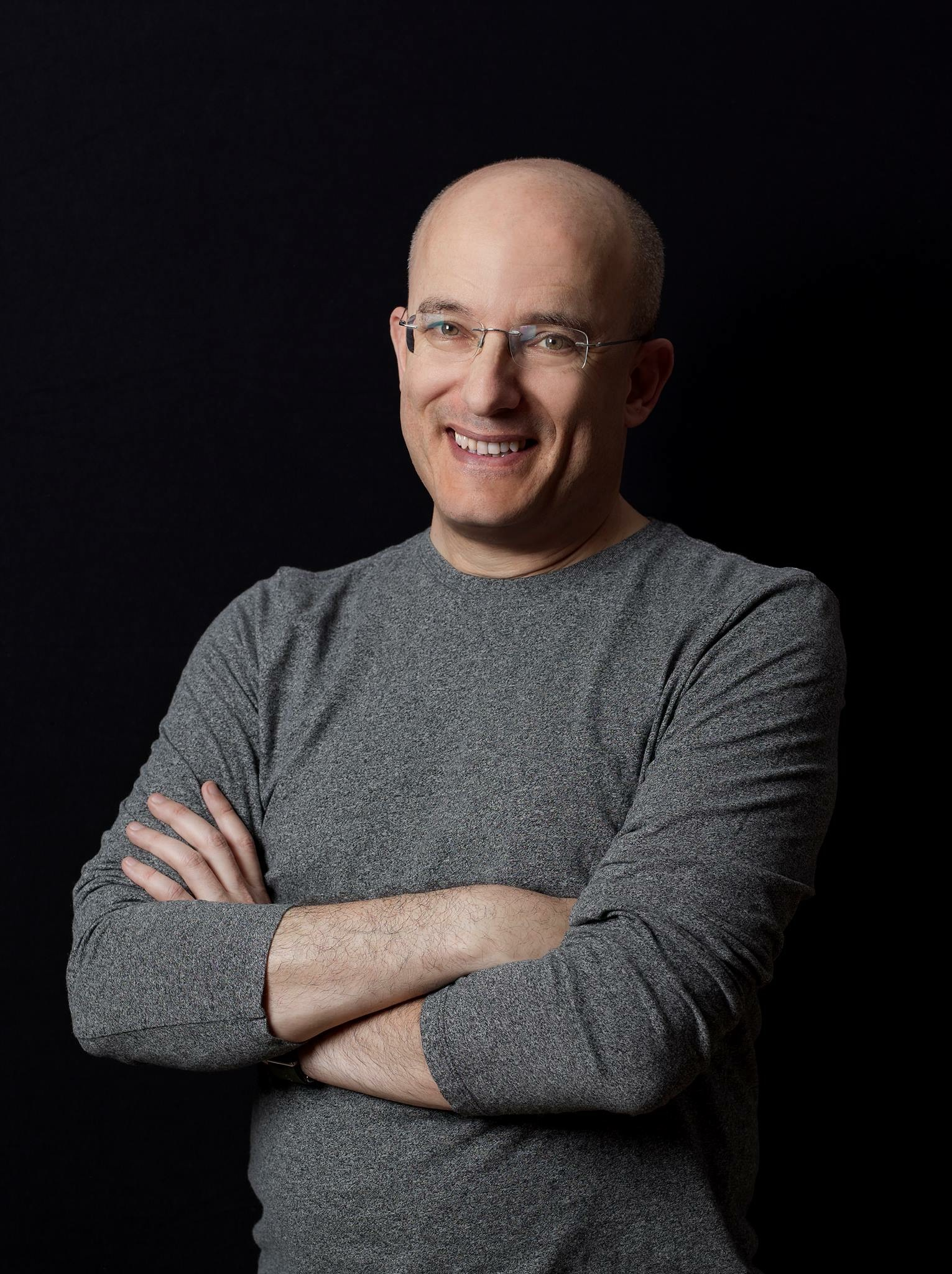
- Hovav in 2021
- Born: March 17, 1962 (age 64); Jerusalem, Israel
- Education: Hebrew University of Jerusalem
- Occupations: TV presenter, culinary journalist, restaurant critic, and author.
- Years active: 1989–present
- Children: 1
- Parents: Moshe Hovav (father); Drora Ben Avi (mother)
- Relatives: Itamar Ben-Avi (maternal grandfather); Eliezer Ben-Yehuda (maternal great-grandfather)

Gil Hovav (Hebrew: גיל חובב; born March 17, 1962) is an Israeli TV presenter, culinary journalist, restaurant critic, and author. The Jewish Chronicle described him as "Israel's most famous television chef and cookery-book writer," and The Forward calls him "Israel's top foodie." He is the grandson of Itamar Ben-Avi, who began modern Israeli journalism, and the great-grandson of Eliezer Ben-Yehuda, who revived Hebrew as a modern language.

== Early life ==
Hovav was born in Jerusalem, Israel. In his youth he lived there in the Katamon and Kiryat Shmuel neighborhoods, and he is Jewish. His parents, Yemenite-Israeli Moshe Hovav and Ashkenazi-Israeli Drora Ben Avi, were among the first members of Kol Yisrael, the first public radio in Israel. His father was the chief news announcer and head of radio, and his mother headed radio stations Reshet Bet and Reshet Gimel.

He is the maternal grandson of Itamar Ben-Avi, a journalist born in Jerusalem, Ottoman Empire in 1882 who began modern Israeli journalism. Also on his mother's side, Hovav is the great-grandson of 19th century Zionist scholar Eliezer Ben-Yehuda, who led efforts to revive Hebrew as a modern language. Hovav said that his family ranks cities in Israel according to the size of Ben Yehuda Streets in each of them. The Yemenite Jewish side of his family walked from Yemen to Palestine in the late 19th century.

When he was five years old, during the battle for Jerusalem in the Six Day War in 1967, he and his family hid in their building's shelter for four days. Hovav graduated from the Rehavia Hebrew High School in Jerusalem. He then graduated from the Hebrew University of Jerusalem, which he attended to study Arabic, and completed a graduate degree in French literature and general studies. He initially supported himself as a bartender at the Jerusalem Sheraton Hotel, by teaching Arabic, and by cleaning homes.

== Journalism career ==
From 1989 to 1993, Hovav worked for the newspaper Hadashot as a reporter in the Shabbat supplement, critiquing restaurants and culture. He then worked for the newspapers Ha'ir and Haaretz as a restaurant critic. He also worked as a restaurant reviewer and deputy editor of the weekly supplement for Israel's largest circulation daily, Yediot Achronot. He said that he preferred to inform those who read his reviews where they might like to eat, instead of which restaurant gave him "heartburn". The Jewish Chronicle described him as "Israel's most famous television chef and cookery-book writer", and The Forward calls him "Israel's top foodie".

In 2000, Hovav founded the book publishing and production house "Toad", which publishes the cookbooks, novels, and collections of short stories that he wrote and compiled. In 2001, while at Ground Zero after the 9/11 attack, he cooked a breakfast of shakshuka for 500 firefighters who were working at the fallen World Trade Center.

== Television career ==
Hovav has created, written, produced, and presented a number of cooking programs and food programs on television. These include the first two seasons of the food series "Garlic, Pepper and Olive Oil" on Channel 1 (1998–2000), "Going to the Market" ("Ossim Shuk," with him visiting different food markets) on the Channel 2 concessionaire Telad (2001), "Captain Cook" (with him globetrotting and exploring the world's best restaurants) on the Channel 10 (2002–03), "Making a Holiday" on Channel 3, "Gil Hovav and the Extras" on Channel 3 (2005), "The Israeli Food Parade" on Channel 2, "The State's Dish" on Channel 2 (2008), and "The Flying Chef" (2009–11).

From 2009 to 2013, he presented the program "Food for Thought" on Channel 23, in which he interviewed 20 Nobel Prize laureates including Daniel Kahneman, Eric Kandel, John Nash, and Elie Wiesel. On the show, Hovav met with interviewees in their home, cooked dishes from literary classics, and took his interviewees to a bookstore where they discussed their favorite books. In 2011 to 2012, Hovav was a presenter for the Israeli Army Radio program "Roaring Night Birds". Asked in late 2012 why he wasn't on television of late, he said "I think I'm not very suitable for this decade's television. Because I'm not a blonde with big tits... There used to be a place for bald people on TV, but now there isn't."

In 2013, Hovav presented the program "Meals that Made History" on Channel 23. Each episode depicted a recipe related to a historical period covered in the episode, such as shrimp in orange sauce at the Last Supper (according to the painting by Leonardo da Vinci), and featured interviews with historians and archaeologists.

As of 2016, he was the voice of the announcements at Ben Gurion Airport. Annoyed by small grammatical errors in the airport's announcements in Hebrew, he called the airport's management and complained. The management responded by inviting him to come and read the announcements himself. Management then clarified that they were not going to pay him, and Hovav said "who wants money for that?" So he now reads the announcements at Ben Gurion Airport.

In 2017, Hovav directed the tourism program "Open Skies" on the Israeli "Keshet 12" channel. In 2019, he started presenting the "Ochel Israel" podcast belonging to the Making History Network. The podcast includes restaurant recommendations, recipes, and other food-related tips.

== Personal life ==
Hovav is gay, and lives in Tel Aviv, Israel. His partner of over 30 years is professor Danny Halperin, a computer scientist and professor at Tel Aviv University. They met when they were both in the intelligence service in the Israel Defense Forces, and both thought they were straight.

He came out at 25 years of age, and says "it was so easy it was embarrassing". While Hovav is not a very political person, when asked to join one LGBT issue or another he does, but he says he is "not a picket-sign holder". He did, however, once grab a sign at a protest supporting the LGBT movement, and chanted slogans as he marched with the sign, only to discover later when he looked at the sign that written on it were the words: "I'm a proud lesbian!" He opined on the subject of LGBTQ rights in Israel: "In gay rights, Israel is a beacon and especially in the neighborhood it is in, in the Middle East. Also, when you compare it to the United States, Europe, or Uruguay, Israel is really progressive."

The couple lived in San Francisco, California, for three years as Halperin completed postdoctoral work at Stanford University. They have a daughter whose mother is Deborah Frishberg (a former basketball player for Hapoel Haifa and the Israeli national team, and a member of Kibbutz Ein Dor).

== Written works ==
By 2013, Hovav had published 16 books. Among his writings are:

- Kitch (קיטש): Jerusalem, Keter Publishing House. 1995
- My Family's Kitchen: (illustrations–Noam Nadav). 1996
- Sun, Sea and Food: Mediterranean cooking (together with Ayelet Latovitch, Dalia Penn-Lerner; photos–Nelly Shafer; (Moden, 1998)
- Gifts from the Kitchen (Moden, 1999)
- Going to the Market (עושים שוק; together with Tzipi Lavi; photos–Billy and Aviram; Toad Publishing; 2001)
- Ten Diets: how to choose the diet that suits you best. (together with Ruthi Aviri Bar-El; illustrations–Yizhar Cohen, photographs–Ariel Shafran, Toad, 2003)
- Red, White and Everything in Between: wine for people like you and me (Ther, 2004)
- Gil Hovav and the Extras: The Recipe Book of the TV Show (Toad, 2005)
- Candies from Heaven (in Hebrew; illustrations– Noam Nadav; Toad, 2007)
- The Sweets of Gil Hovav (photos–Moti Fishbein); Toad, 2008)
- Grandma's Food (dish photography–Itiel Zion; portrait photography–Reli Abrahami; recipe research and editing–Eli Hoffner; Toad, 2008)
- How to Have Fun (Moden, 2009)
- Cooking with 5 Ingredients (Toad and Moden, 2012)
- Confessions of a Kitchen Rebbetzen (in English; Toad and Moden, 2012)
- Twenty-four Doors (Moden, 2015)
- Candies from Heaven (in English; Hovav, 2017)
- A Little Book About the Big World (Moden, 2020)
- Closer from Afar: Short stories and novella (2021)
- To Love in Hebrew: The Love Letters of Itamar Ben Avi and Leah Abushdid (Karpad and Modan, 2023)
