= Hemda Ben-Yehuda =

Israeli academic (1873–1951)

- חֶמְדָּה בֵּן־יְהוּדָה
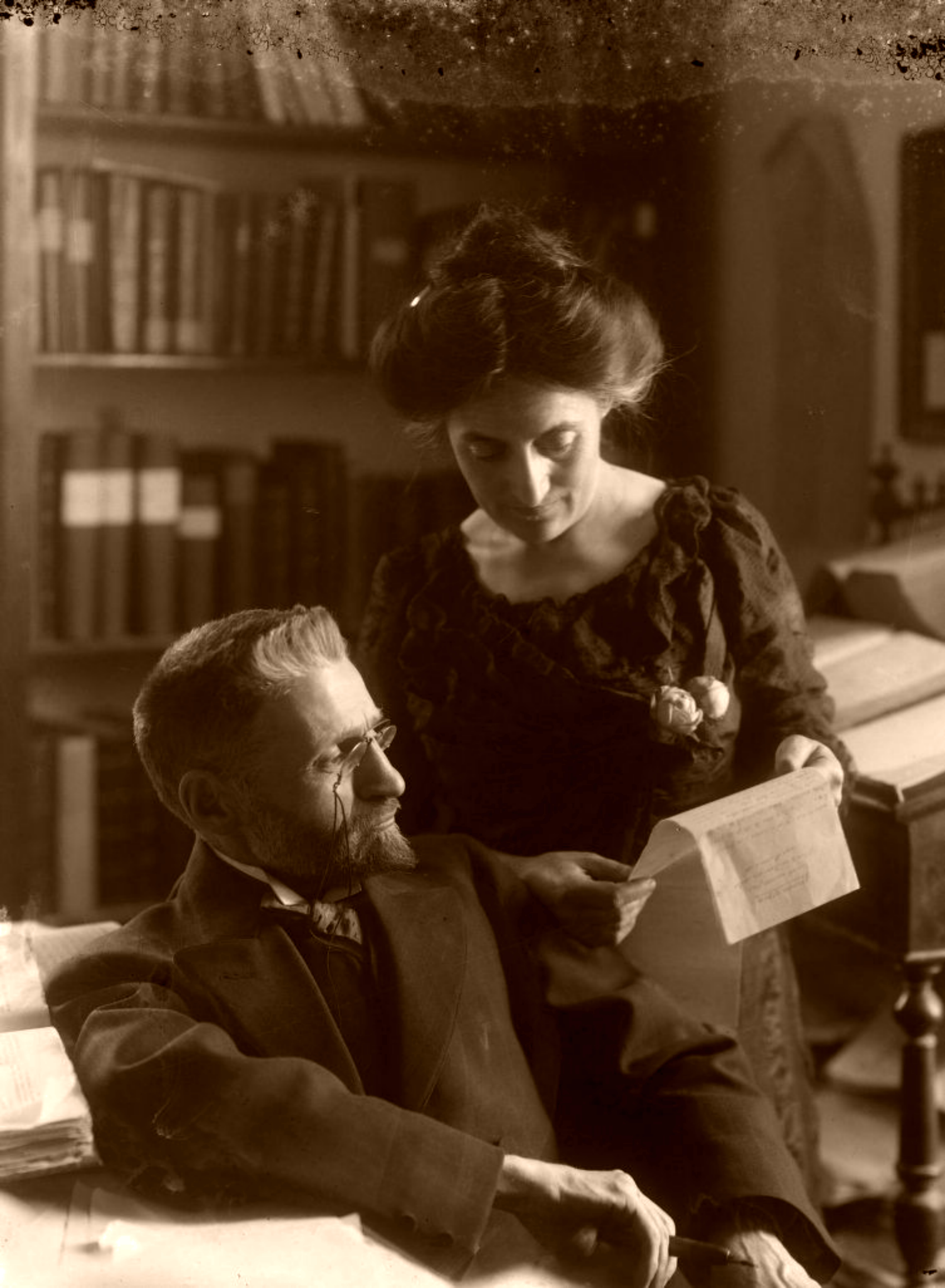
- Eliezer Ben-Yehuda and Hemda, 1912
- Born: Beila Jonas; April 7, 1873; Drissa, Mogilev Governorate, Russian Empire (present-day Belarus)
- Died: August 25, 1951 (aged 78); Jerusalem, Israel
- Other names: Belle, Paula
- Occupations: Journalist, author
- Spouse: Eliezer Ben-Yehuda

Hemda Ben‑Yehuda (Hebrew: חֶמְדָּה בֵּן־יְהוּדָה, lit. 'Hemda, child of Judah'; April 7, 1873 – August 25, 1951) was a Jewish journalist and author, and the second wife of Eliezer Ben-Yehuda.

== Biography ==
=== Early years; name changes ===
Hemdah Ben‑Yehuda was born Beila Jonas in Drissa (Verkhnyadzvinsk), Belarus to Shelomo Naphtali Herz Jonas (1840–1896) and his wife Rivka Leah. She was the fifth of seven children.

During her early years she underwent several name changes. When she was nine years old, her father renamed her Belle. Upon the family's move to Moscow she became Paula. It was not until her marriage that her husband bestowed upon her the name Hemdah. Her married name is written with or without final "h": Hemda/Hemdah, Ben-Yehudah/Ben-Yehuda.

=== In Moscow ===
In 1882, the family settled in Moscow. Here she attended Russian primary and high school before continuing to a women's college of science to study chemistry.

In 1891, her eldest sister Deborah (b. 1855), who was married to Eliezer Ben-Yehuda, died of tuberculosis in Jerusalem. Only a few weeks later Ben-Yehuda, who knew Hemdah from his visits to her family, hastened to ask her to marry him, claiming that this had been Deborah's wish before her death. Paula agreed at once, but her father objected to the match, both because of the fifteen-year difference in age between the two and also because he feared that, like her sister, she would be infected by the tuberculosis from which Ben-Yehuda suffered.

=== Move to Jerusalem ===
In the winter of 1892, a diphtheria epidemic that broke out in Jerusalem caused the death of three of the children of Deborah and Eliezer, leaving only two, Ben-Zion (Itamar), and Yemima. During the entire period Ben-Yehuda's mother had been helping him run the household, but now, when all seemed lost, Shelomo Jonas relented. In any case, his permit to reside in Moscow had expired, so that he was compelled to leave the city. Accordingly, it was decided that the entire family would emigrate to Palestine and Paula would marry Ben-Yehuda. Jonas, his two younger children and Paula departed for Istanbul where Paula and Eliezer were married on March 29, 1892. On this occasion Ben-Yehuda changed Paula's name to Hemdah; the first Hebrew word he taught her was mafteah (key), a word which she perceived as symbolic, signifying her entrance not only into marriage but also into a new country, a new people and a new culture. Indeed, Hemdah, who was deeply involved in Russian culture, profoundly attracted to the theories of Leo Tolstoy and remote from Judaism and Zionism, abandoned everything: her studies at the college, her friends and the attractions of life in a great city. At the age of nineteen she came to develop herself in a desolate, distant land with a poverty-stricken, persecuted, consumptive widower fifteen years older than herself, and his two orphaned children.

=== "First Hebrew-speaking family" ===
The Jonases and Ben-Yehudas arrived in Palestine on April 15 and at once proceeded to Jerusalem. Here Hemdah learned that her role was not only that of wife and mother but also one of national-cultural dimensions: hers would be the "first Hebrew (-speaking) family", namely, the first and only Zionist family in Erez Israel who communicated with each other only in Hebrew, at a time when Hebrew was not yet fit for everyday speech and communication and certainly not for use in intimate family discourse, child-rearing and education, for which it lacked a great many words essential to daily life. Hemdah committed herself to this impossible role as part of her marriage, and the marriage ceremony was indeed presented as her acceptance of a sacred mission that could never be abandoned. She wrote:

"I was utterly shocked at the unbearably heavy burden which the reviver of language placed upon my shoulders. He did not ask for my consent but for a vow, which I gave. Ben-Yehuda’s personality was so compelling that I did not dare to doubt my own ability. And there was no way other than to submit and accept it all with surrender, and to go wherever he went."

=== Cultural, social and family life ===
Hemdah made every effort to live up to her promises, though on her own terms. On all she did, she imposed the dominant personality of a young, modern, secular woman whose principles of aesthetics, culture and enlightenment informed her choices and actions. Within six months she was fluent in basic Hebrew and from then on spoke only Hebrew in their home. She also made her home a model for modern life in Jerusalem; after a long day of hard work (the newspaper by which they made their living, together with its printing, was operated from their apartment) and caring for the children, she invited people of letters and culture from Erez Israel and abroad to their home, referring to this custom as creating a "meeting place for scholars" (Pirkei Avot 1:4). Above all, she became involved in all Ben-Yehuda's professional and political activities, especially the disputes with his opponents which led to bans, arrests and lawsuits that affected their livelihood and his status in the community. Hemdah's role in these matters was to calm things down, mediate and mend ruptured relations, and this she did. At the end of 1893 she succeeded in securing Ben-Yehuda's release when he and her father were imprisoned and Ha-Zevi, the newspaper on which their livelihood depended, ceased publication for fourteen months.

The circumstances of the incident were as follows: During the week of Hanukkah Hemdah gave birth to her first child, Deborah. Since Ben-Yehuda was occupied with caring for her, her father edited the festive issue and published an article praising the heroism of the Maccabees. This was mistakenly interpreted by the authorities as a call to rebellion against the Ottoman rule. In 1900 the paper was reestablished under a different name, Hashkafa, with Hemdah as its official owner, the "holder of the firman". She used her connections to raise funds in Palestine and abroad to publish Ben-Yehuda's major work, the first modern Hebrew dictionary, and created comfortable working conditions in which Ben-Yehuda could carry on his research even when the house was full of children. (She bore six, two of whom—the oldest daughter, Deborah, and a son, Ehud—died in childhood. The four who survived were Ada, Ehud-Shelomo, Deborah-Dolah and Zilpah). She accompanied her husband on his travels to libraries and archives, met with American and European leaders, and appeared before Jewish audiences, Zionist and non-Zionist alike. Her slogan was: "If we have a language, we shall become a nation."

=== The Hebrew dictionary ===
Ben-Yehuda's colossal enterprise of reviving the Hebrew language by gathering into one dictionary all Hebrew words, especially the neologisms of recent years, was also Hemdah's enterprise. During the thirty years of their life together, from 1892 to 1922, she furthered the dictionary (known as the Ben-Yehuda Dictionary) volume by volume, seven in all (the first volume was published in 1908). Upon her husband's death and during the decades that followed (1922 to 1951) she did everything in her power to complete the dictionary rapidly, to its last letter. In 1923 and 1933 she established committees of scholars from Palestine and abroad to take charge of completing the work, and mobilized the Jewish world and the yishuv in Palestine to contribute financial assistance. The last volume was published in 1958, seven years after her death.

=== Writing and other activities ===
Hemdah Ben-Yehuda was active in three additional areas on which she left her original mark: journalism, literature and the advancement of women's status in Palestine. She began by working for Ben-Yehuda's newspaper (known at various times as Ha-Zevi, Ha-Or and Hashkafah) about a year after her arrival. In 1897 Hemdah Ben-Yehuda began writing a column called "Letters from Jerusalem" under the pen name "Hiddah" (riddle). According to Galia Yardeni, these letters "were an innovation in Hebrew journalism" because of their "intimate pleasantness, lightness and warmth." Unlike the average contemporary Hebrew newspaper, which used ornate, clumsy diction to discuss world affairs, Hemdah's compositions, including her critical pieces, dealt with everyday human subjects. As she herself wrote, "I shall not write about great, weighty matters. … I shall simply write about scenes from life in Jerusalem, things we see in the marketplaces and the streets every day."

Hemdah Ben-Yehuda also wrote fiction, some of which was published in slim volumes (e.g. Farm of the Rechabites) by the Jerusalem publishing company of Shlomo Israel Shirizli. She collected most of her work in a book entitled Lives of the Pioneers in Erez Israel (1945). She wrote a great deal for children, including the series "Children's Lives in Erez Israel", which was published in the Hebrew children's press in Europe (Olam Katan in Vienna and Kraków, Life and Nature in Vilna, and by the Tushiyyah Publishing House in Warsaw). Yet her major literary work was a family trilogy of which only two volumes were published:

- Ben-Yehuda: His Life and Work (1940) (in a 1932 version, The Happy Warrior) and
- Standard-Bearer (1944), the life of Ithamar Ben-Avi (1882–1943), the son of Eliezer Ben-Yehuda.

The third volume,

- Devorah, Mother of the Hebrews, remained in manuscript form.

These works were not only novels documenting the family's dramatic and colorful life, but also provided a Zionist narrative in which the Ben-Yehudas, who were mythical figures for her, represented the nation's founders, appearing in the threefold character of the father (Eliezer, who performed "sacred service"), the mother (Deborah, the "family’s idol" and the first woman to revive Hebrew in the speech of her children), and the son (Ithamar Ben-Avi, the "standard-bearer", the "guinea pig" in the fateful experiment of raising a child speaking only Hebrew).

Like most of Hemdah Ben-Yehuda's prose, these works proved controversial since their critics, particularly those who subscribed to the school of Realism of the time, maintained that her exaggerated treatment of real-life material swept her work to the borders of fantasy and cheapened it.

=== Final years ===
From the end of the 1940s Hemdah's health steadily declined as a result of a fall that left her badly injured. She died on August 25, 1951.
