= HaZvi =

Hebrew-language newspaper published from 1884 to 1914

HaZvi הַצְּבִי
- Front page of HaZvi with a sub-headline reading "Newspaper for news, literature and science"
- Type: daily
- Founder: Eliezer Ben-Yehuda
- Editor: Eliezer Ben-Yehuda
- Founded: October 24, 1884
- Ceased publication: 1914
- Political alignment: Zionism
- Language: Hebrew
- Headquarters: Jerusalem
- Circulation: 1,200

HaZvi (Hebrew: הַצְּבִי, also Hatzevi and Hazewi, literally 'The Gazelle') was a Hebrew-language newspaper published in Jerusalem from 1884 to 1914 by Eliezer Ben-Yehuda, a pioneer of the revival of Hebrew as a spoken tongue.

== History ==
The first issue of HaZvi was published on October 24, 1884. It began as a weekly paper and eventually developed into a daily. In 1909, the paper had a peak circulation of 1,200 copies, 500 distributed in Jerusalem.

HaZvi revolutionized Hebrew newspaper publishing in Jerusalem by introducing secular issues and techniques of modern journalism, especially after Itamar Ben-Avi, Ben-Yehuda's son, joined the paper. Influenced by the French press, Ben-Avi brought in sensational headlines and a style of reporting that differed from newspapers of the old school. HaZvi became the organ of the New Yishuv (pre-state Jewish community), as the first Jewish agricultural colonies were founded. The paper included translations of French literature (previously only German literature had appeared in translation) and original Hebrew prose. The need for Hebrew words to report the daily news prompted Ben-Yehuda to begin his lifelong project of compiling a Hebrew dictionary (Ben-Yehuda Dictionary). All this fit in with the Hebraist ideology that was on the rise.

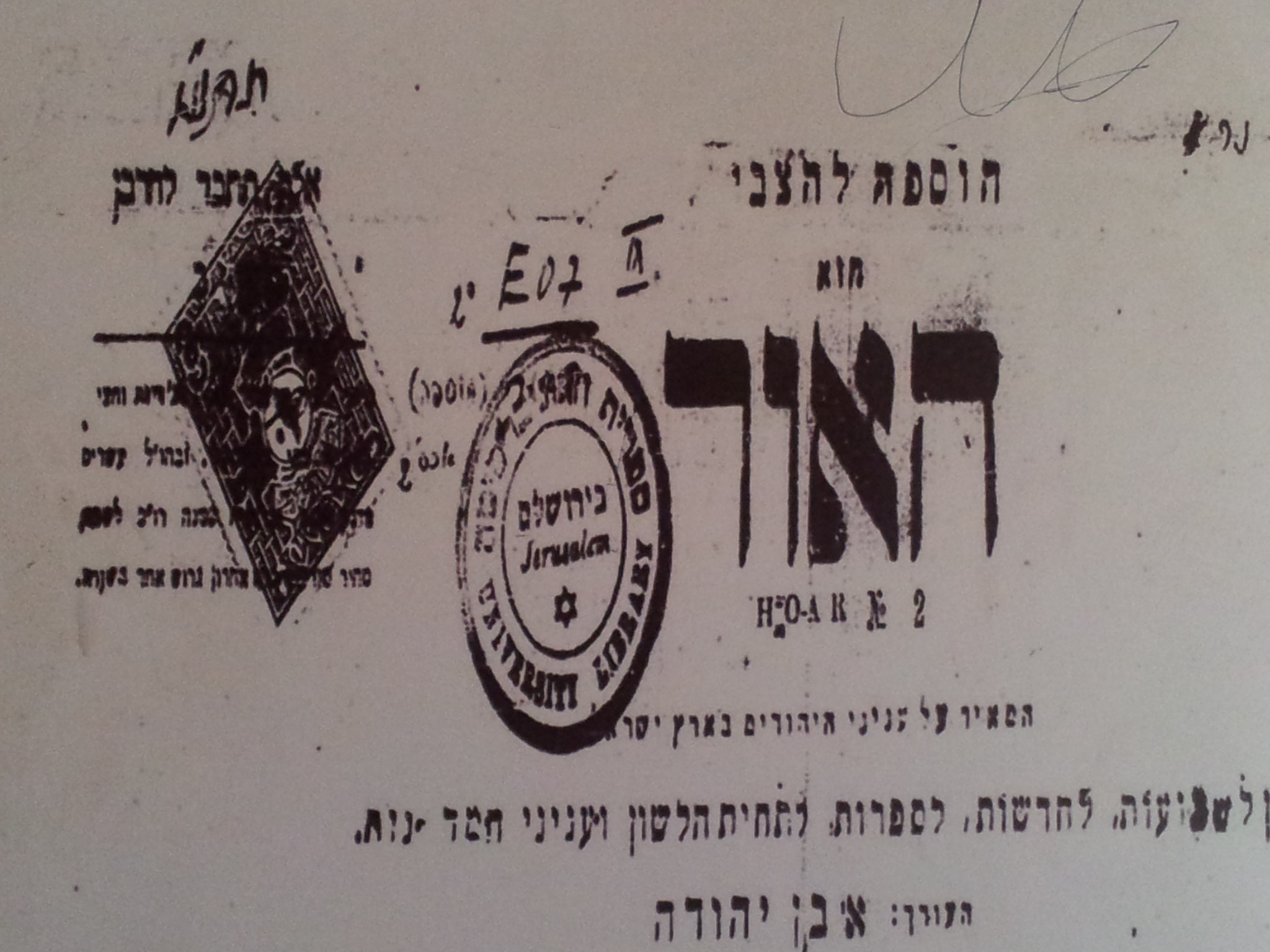
HaOr front page

In 1908, the name of the paper was changed to HaOr (האור 'The Light') due to licensing restrictions.

The paper was banned by the Ottoman government during the First World War due to its proposals for a Jewish homeland.

== Bibliography ==
- Robert St. John. Tongue of the Prophets, Doubleday & Company, Inc. Garden City, New York, 1952. ISBN 0-8371-2631-2
- Hassan, Hassan Ahmad; al-Kayyali, Abdul-Hameed (2018-07-18). "Ben-Yehuda in his Ottoman Milieu: Jerusalem's Public Sphere as Reflected in the Hebrew Newspaper Ha-Tsevi, 1884–1915". Ordinary Jerusalem, 1840-1940: 330–351. doi:10.1163/9789004375741_021. ISBN 9789004375741. S2CID 201432320.
- Ouzi Elyada, Hebrew Popular Journalism, Birth and Development in Ottoman Palestine, London and New-York, Routledge, 2019, 308p.
