= Ben-Yehuda Dictionary =

Hebrew dictionary compiled in 1908

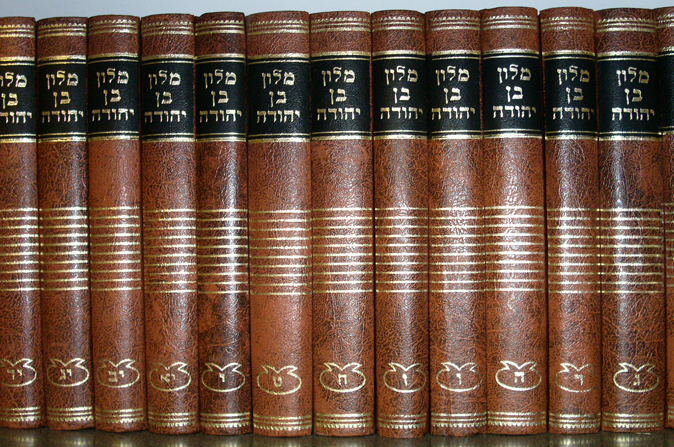
Several volumes of the Ben-Yehuda Dictionary

The Ben-Yehuda Dictionary is a historical Hebrew dictionary. The first volume was published in 1908 by Eliezer Ben-Yehuda, while the last was published long after his death, in 1958 by his wife Hemda Ben-Yehuda and his son Ehud Ben-Yehuda. An important feature of the dictionary was its inclusion of various new words invented by Ben-Yehuda to describe modern objects which did not yet have words for them.

== Background ==
In his youth, Eliezer Ben-Yehuda studied in a Yeshiva where he was introduced to the Hebrew language. He was told by his Lithuanian friends that the Jews are not a nation and cannot be a nation because they don't speak in one distinct language, That claim inspired his unique perspective that two things will fully unite the Jews into one nation: The land of Israel and the Hebrew language. He expresses that perception in the article "A Burning Question" (Hebrew: שאלה לוהטה) which was published in "Ha-Shaḥar" newspaper. Three years later he wrote the following in the "Havazelet" newspaper: "There was not yet time for Israel since the day of its departure from its land that unity is as needed as today. A great and weighty matter lies before us this time, which cannot be done by the strength of one man, nor by the strength of a thousand men, but only by the strength of the entire people. But this unity will not happen unless one language is spoken, and no other language besides its ancestral language will give him this unity".

Until the late 19th century, the Hebrew language was used exclusively for literature and prayer and many Jewish circles opposed Ben-Yehuda's mission to make Hebrew a spoken language. Nevertheless, Ben-Yehuda believed that it was possible to educate the people to speak the language. His only doubt was whether it was possible to revive Hebrew, which had not been spoken for many years, and adapt it to his era. He researched and asked language experts if such a revival process had occurred in the past, but received negative responses. Ben-Yehuda argued that it was difficult but possible to accomplish. He decided to check his theory by starting to talk to himself in Hebrew but quickly found out his vocabulary was limited. He started searching for a Hebrew dictionary with suitable vocabulary for 19th-century language but did not find one.

At this point, Ben-Yehuda decided to write a book that would include useful Hebrew words. He started by writing the name of the vessels from "Masechet Keilim" from the Mishna, and later he wrote some less common words he encountered. Before he decided how to name the book he got tuberculosis, stopped studying medicine and moved to Algeria. There he first heard Jews reading the Torah in Sephardic pronunciation and spoke with the Jewish community only in Hebrew which improved his language skills. After he recovered he left Algiers and moved to the land of Israel which was under Ottoman control at the time.

Ben-Yehuda's original intention was not to write a dictionary like the ones we know today but to categorize words by groups: the value 'tree' would contain various names of trees, the value kitchen would contain various names of kitchen utensils and so on. The first value Ben-Yehuda wrote was "stone" which was published in the newspaper "Havazelet". After the value was published Ben-Yehuda realized lists like that would not be enough to accomplish the vision that the entire nation would speak Hebrew. Therefore, he decided to define each and every word, but was discouraged by the enormity of the work this would require, and decided to focus on the difficult words that were the subject of disputes regarding their meaning.

His work on the dictionary was delayed due to Ben-Yehuda's efforts to revive the Hebrew language: he worked extensively to convince Jewish families to speak only in Hebrew, founded the Hebrew Language Committee in 1890 (which disbanded the next year), and continued to edit several Hebrew newspapers. In 1894, he was banned by the Ottomans after residents of Jerusalem accused him of inciting a rebellion. When his father-in-law, Shlomo Jonas, published a cautious nationalist article in the newspaper "Hatzevi", in which he called to celebrate Hanukkah 1893 as a holiday of Jewish heroism against the backdrop of the awakening of Zionism, he signed with the words: "Let us gather strength and go forward", The Charedim, who opposed Ben-Yehuda's vision mistranslated these words as an intention to gather an army to rebel the Ottomans, reported Ben-Yehuda to the Ottomans as the editor of the paper. This caused Ben-Yehuda to be arrested before a trial in the old city of Jerusalem. According to estimates, Ben-Yehuda was under arrest for about two weeks before being released with the help of Baron Rothschild. However, he was not allowed to re-publish his newspaper "Hatzevi" which gave him time to devote himself entirely to writing the dictionary.

== The writing process ==
A year later Ben-Yehuda published a sample notebook from the dictionary. The essence of the dictionary was first revealed in that notebook: "A complete, comprehensive book containing everything from the bible, Talmud, Midrash and the literature following the Talmud". This essence was different from the original essence of the dictionary which was initially intended to explain words that weren't fully translated before. It seems that this change was caused by Ben-Yehuda's realization that only a few individuals knew the majority of words in the Hebrew language, leading him to believe that the only solution to this problem was to write a complete Hebrew dictionary.

To write the dictionary Ben-Yehuda consulted, among other sources, Menachem Ben-Saruk's "Machberet Menachem," Marcus Jastrow's modern dictionary of Hebrew and Aramaic of Rabbinic literature, as well as Hanoch Yehuda Kohut's "Aruch HaShalem". Moreover, Ben-Yehuda read all the Jewish sources: the bible, the Mishna, the Tosafta, the Midrash halakha, the Babylonian Talmud, the Jerusalem Talmud and the Aggadah. When the Cairo Geniza were revealed, he obtained fragments of the Hebrew text of Ben Sira's book and studied those as well. He also used other important sources such as ancient epigraphy, coins, prayers, Jewish poems (also known as piyyut), Jewish responsa from the Geonim time, literature of the Karaite, the Kabala and science books from his time. About half a million notes containing excerpts from various Jewish sources were found in Ben-Yehuda's house.

The words included in the dictionary are Hebrew words from the above sources. Occasionally, Ben-Yehuda also added some Arabic, Greek and Latin words from the Mishna and the Gmara that he believed were necessary (for example the words "אכסניה" (en': Motel) and "אכסדרה" (en': porch) which appear in the dictionary in their Aramaic forms, "אכסניא" and "אכסדרא"). He testified that there were times when he read hundreds of pages without including a single word in the dictionary. The vocalization of the non-Biblical and non-Talmudic words was mostly based on pointed manuscripts that Ben-Yehuda got access to from those who believed in his work. At this stage, the name of the dictionary was established: "the Dictionary of Ancient and Modern Hebrew".

The dictionary's primary goal was to help revive the Hebrew language to a spoken common language. Therefore, in addition to the already existing Hebrew words the dictionary included new words to make the new Hebrew suitable to the 20th century. Those innovations were marked on the dictionary with a special mark and were based on biblical Hebrew, Mishnaic Hebrew and even on foreign languages. In some cases the meaning of a word was altered to suit the era, for example the word "אקדח" (en': gun). Some of the words were created by using the structure of other words, as was done with the word "גלידה" (en': ice cream), which was derived from the Aramaic word "גליד" (en': ice) in the pattern of "לביבה" (en': potato pancake). In a few instances, a foreign word was adopted and lightly modified, as was done with the word "בּדוּרה" (a word innovation that wasn't accepted for tomato) which was borrowed from the Arabic language. Many of Ben-Yehuda's innovations entered the Hebrew language.

The words in the dictionary were arranged alphabetically, distinguishing it from other dictionaries. At the time, many dictionaries followed the practice of arranging entries alphabetically by the root letters, meaning that the word "אגרוף" (en': fist) would appear under the root letters ג-ר-ף. This system was common for many years in both foreign and Hebrew dictionaries. However, Ben-Yehuda opposed this method because he knew that very few people knew the root of every Hebrew word.

Defining words and providing their meanings was a main goal of Ben-Yehuda since the very beginning. He aimed not only to define each word precisely but also to differentiate it from similar words. For example, he did not settle for defining the word "מעדר" (en': hoe) merely as a tool for digging but explained how it differed from the word "אֵת" (en': shovel). Many times he consulted with experts to define words in their field to ensure the accuracy of the dictionary. However, sometimes he encountered difficult words where even Jewish commentaries of the bible did not reach a consensus regarding their meaning. In those cases, he did not include all the interpretations written for the word in the dictionary but rather wrote down the meaning that most writers used after the era of the Chazal. If there was an agreement about the meaning of a particular word but it was used with a different meaning in literature, he wrote down both meanings side by side.

In addition to defining each word, Ben-Yehuda included translation to three languages: English, German, and French. This was mainly done by Ben-Yehuda's assistant, Moshe Bar-Nissim. This made the dictionary the first Hebrew dictionary to both define and translate its entries. Ben-Yehuda explained that the translations are needed because many people did not know the Hebrew language well, and therefore, it would be difficult for them to understand the explanations on their own. He believed that adding translations would clarify the precise meanings of the words in the dictionary.

Furthermore, Ben-Yehuda included etymologies and comparisons to other languages in the dictionary. This part of his work heavily relied on the book of the German Bible scholar Wilhelm Gesenius, "Thesaurus philologico-criticus linguae Hebraicae et Chaldaicae V.T". The etymologies and comparisons appeared in footnotes to the entries and were more detailed and thorough than was customary. Etymologically, Ben-Yehuda's dictionary is the most comprehensive of all Hebrew dictionaries written to this day. However, some of the etymologies are outdated and even incorrect.

Each entry has several components: Every entry is punctuated, and next to it is a sign indicating its source. If there is an etymological note for the entry, its number is noted next to its name. Following this, the definitions are provided, followed by translations into English, German, and French. The main body of the entry is a structured compilation from the various sources that existed before Ben-Yehuda.

The writing of the dictionary took a long time because it was done by Ben-Yehuda alone. Some argued at the beginning of the writing that it was fitting for the dictionary to be written by a panel of experts and not by a single expert. However, Ben-Yehuda dismissed these claims and stated that personal work would improve the quality of the dictionary. Nevertheless, the extensive work on the dictionary affected the normal course of Ben-Yehuda's life. He slept less and less, and even considered stopping the writing. The decision to continue was influenced by his sister-in-law, Hemeda (the sister of his late wife, whom he later married), who encouraged him to continue writing and took care of all his needs.

The first volume of the dictionary was only published in 1908, by Langenscheidt in Berlin. This volume was actually ready earlier, but financial difficulties delayed its publication, even though Baron Rothschild supported Ben-Yehuda financially for most of his work on the dictionary. Until 1922, the year of his death, four additional volumes were published.

== The dictionary after Ben-Yehuda's death ==
Ben-Yehuda left behind a substantial amount of material that required editing. After his death, his widow, Hemda, and his son, Ehud, worked to publish the volumes that were written but not yet published. They also sought researchers to complete the missing volumes. During this period, Ben-Yehuda's assistant, Moshe Bar-Nissim, continued to work on the dictionary.

At this stage, the sixth volume was already prepared for printing, the writing of the seventh volume was completed, and most of the entries for the eighth volume were written. The seventh volume was published with the assistance of the "Emunim Fund for Eliezer Ben-Yehuda." During this period, the dictionary acquired the nickname "Ben-Yehuda's Dictionary."

During the 1929 Palestine riots in Jerusalem, the residents of Talpiot were forced to evacuate the neighborhood for their safety. Among them were Ben-Yehuda's widow, Hemda Ben-Yehuda, and the family friend, journalist Yeshayahu Karniel. They left with a British police escort to retrieve the draft manuscripts of the dictionary from boxes just before the Arab rioters reached the house.

Entries for the sixth and seventh volumes were edited by the biblical and Talmudic language scholar, Professor Moshe Zvi Segal. Segal completed these volumes in 1931. In 1938, the "Association for Completing Eliezer Ben-Yehuda's Hebrew Language Dictionary" was established to raise funds to finance the publication of the missing volumes. The seven following volumes and the introduction volume were edited by the President of the Academy of the Hebrew Language, Professor Naftali Herz Tur-Sinai. Tur-Sinai completed the dictionary in 1959. In the end, Ben-Yehuda's dictionary comprises 17 volumes, including the introduction volume.

Both Segal and Tur-Sinai were responsible for writing the biblical entries that Ben-Yehuda did not write, as well as the entries that followed the Bible in the volumes assigned to them. Their contribution to completing the dictionary was significant. In the tenth volume alone, Tur-Sinai wrote over 250 biblical entries himself. Sometimes, Segal and Tur-Sinai added to Ben-Yehuda's entries information from ancient sources that had been discovered since his death. However, they made sure not to include words that were coined after his death. They separated their notes from Ben-Yehuda's notes by enclosing them in square brackets.

== The contribution of the dictionary ==
Ben-Yehuda's dictionary was the most popular and comprehensive dictionary of the Hebrew language among the people until "Even-Shoshan Dictionary" by Avraham Even-Shoshan was published. The dictionary made significant contributions to the lexicographic research of the Hebrew language. It continues to serve as the most extensive scientific dictionary in Hebrew, and scholars of biblical and spoken Hebrew often consult it due to the numerous citations it contains from various sources. Moreover, Ben-Yehuda's dictionary serves as a historical document documenting the development of Hebrew in the second half of the nineteenth century and the beginning of the twentieth century.
