= Itamar Ben-Avi =

Palestinian-Jewish journalist and activist (1882–1943)

- איתמר בן־אב״י
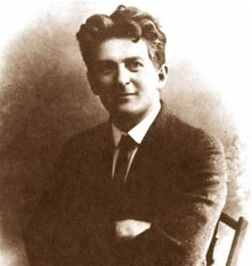
- Ben-Avi in 1912
- Born: Ben-Zion Ben-Yehuda; 31 July 1882; Jerusalem, Ottoman Empire
- Died: 8 April 1943 (aged 60); New York City, New York, U.S.
- Occupation: Journalist
- Known for: Being the first native speaker of Modern Hebrew
- Spouse: Leah Abushedid (m. 1914)
- Children: 3, including Drora Ben Avi
- Parents: Eliezer Ben-Yehuda (father); Devora Ben Yehuda (mother)
- Relatives: Dola Ben-Yehuda Wittmann (half-sister); Gil Hovav (grandson)

Itamar Ben-Avi (Hebrew: איתמר בן־אב״י; né Ben-Zion Ben-Yehuda, בן־ציון בן־יהודה; 31 July 1882 – 8 April 1943) was the first native speaker of modern day-Hebrew. He was a journalist and Zionist activist.

== Biography ==
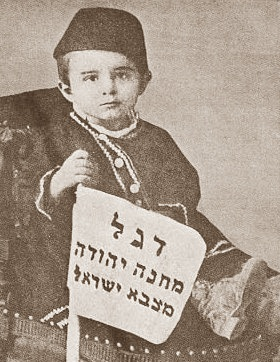
Itamar Ben-Avi as a child

Itamar Ben-Avi was born as Ben-Zion Ben-Yehuda in Jerusalem on 31 July 1882, the son of Devora (née Jonas) and Eliezer Ben-Yehuda. Eliezer is credited with reviving the Hebrew language; Itamar was brought up to be the first native speaker of Hebrew in the modern era. At his father's insistence, Itamar was not permitted to hear any language other than Hebrew at home. When he was very young, Itamar always wanted someone to play with, but his parents did not want him to speak with the other children who spoke different languages. He made friends with a dog which he called Ma'her (מהר), meaning "fast" in Hebrew. His three siblings died in a diphtheria epidemic and his mother died of tuberculosis in 1891. He and his family were ostracized from the Haredi community due to their usage of Hebrew as a day-to-day language. The religious community saw this as sacrilege because they viewed it as the language of the Torah and prayers, and not as an everyday language.

After his mother's death in 1891, his father married her younger sister, the writer Hemda Ben-Yehuda (née Beila Jonas), so Itamar's aunt became his stepmother. After his mother's death, he changed his name to Itamar, as that was the name his parents originally intended to give him (named after the priest Ithamar). The name Itamar means "Island of Dates" and derives from the Hebrew word tamar (תמר, date or palm tree), which is a symbol of Zionism. As his last name, he used Ben-Avi. Avi (אב״י) is an acronym (as indicated by the use of the gershayim mark ״) for Eliezer Ben Yehuda (as written in Hebrew: אליעזר בן יהודה) and also means "my father", so Ben-Avi means "my father's son".

At the age of 19, Ben-Avi sailed to Europe and studied at universities in Paris and Berlin. He returned to Palestine in 1908 as a journalist, joining his father in editing and writing Hebrew newspapers.

Ben-Avi married Leah Abushedid (1889–1982), born in Jerusalem to a wealthy Moroccan-Jewish family. Ben-Avi met her when he was 23 and she was 16. Due to his poor financial situation, his Ashkenazi background, and their age difference, Abushedid's parents did not approve of their marriage. Hoping to convince her parents, he published poems proclaiming his love for her in HaOr. After three years, when he published a poem about suicide, they relented and permitted the marriage. After two years of negotiating the marriage contract, the couple married in 1914. They had three daughters: Dror-Eilat (1917–1921), Drora (1922–1981), and Rina (1925–2016). Drora and Rina became radio news broadcasters.

Ben-Avi is the maternal grandfather of TV presenter, culinary journalist, restaurant critic, and author Gil Hovav, who is a son of Drora Ben Avi.

In 1919, he founded a Hebrew daily newspaper called Doar HaYom (The Daily Mail), and ran it until 1929. In addition, he was a Zionist activist and officer with Bnei Binyamin and the Jewish National Fund. He served as a Jewish National Fund emissary to various countries. Together with Oved Ben-Ami, he helped raise the funds for the founding of Netanya.

Unlike many Zionists, Ben-Avi favored establishment of a canton system for Palestine instead of a single Jewish state or a single Arab state. He based his proposal, which included equal rights and free movement between different ethnic and religious groups, on the Swiss model. In 1930, for example, he called for dividing the British mandate of Palestine into six Jewish, six Muslim, and three Christian cantons. “The spirit in Palestine among Jews and non-Jews,” he declared, “is very much in favor of the plan, because it would lead to peace and harmony.”

In 1939, as his financial situation deteriorated and in need of a steady income, Ben-Avi left his family for the United States to take up a posting as the Jewish National Fund representative in New York City. He died there in 1943 at the age of 60, five years before the establishment of Israel. He was buried on the Mount of Olives in Jerusalem in 1947.

== Journalism and literary career ==
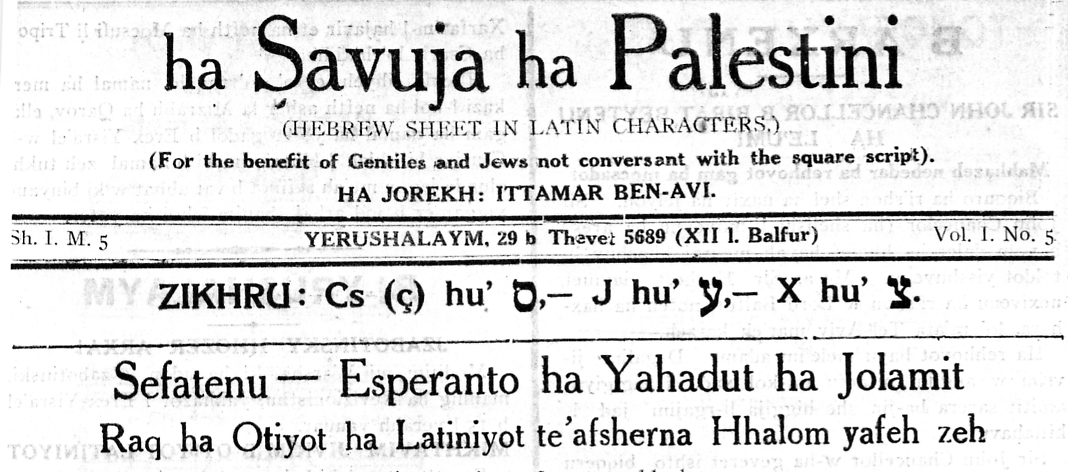
Ha Şavuja ha Palestini (in Hebrew: השבוע הפלשתיני; modern transliteration: ha-Shavua ha-Palestini). 11 January 1929.

He was the chief editor and journalist of Doar HaYom, the then Hebrew style-twin of the British Daily Mail, from 1920 to 1933. He also advocated the widespread use of the international language Esperanto.

Ben-Avi was an advocate for the Romanization of Hebrew. He favored the Latin alphabet, a full alphabet with vowel letters, rather than the traditional Hebrew alphabet, a consonantal orthography of Hebrew (with limited matres lectionis) using "squared Assyrian letters".

He wrote a Hebrew biography of his father - this biography was titled Avi ("My Father") and was printed in his own made-up version of a Hebrew alphabet using Latin letters and some variations thereof. He pioneered and was chief editor of two short lived Hebrew weeklies in reformed Latin script. The first was Hashavua Hapalestini (The Palestinian Week, 1928) and the second was Dror (Liberty, 1934).
