= Ben Yehuda Street =

Ben Yehuda Street may refer to:

- Ben Yehuda Street, Jerusalem
- Ben Yehuda Street, Tel Aviv
- Ben Yehuda Street, Haifa
- Ben Yehuda Street, Kfar Saba
