= Morris Young =

Morris Young may refer to:

- B. Morris Young (1854–1931), American missionary
- Morris Young (entomologist) (1822–1897), Scottish entomologist
- Morris A. Young, sheriff of Gadsden County, Florida from 2004
- Morris Youdelevitz Young (1880–1950), British medical doctor and researcher
