= Yoel Drubin =

Co-founder of Rishon LeZion

- יואל דרובין
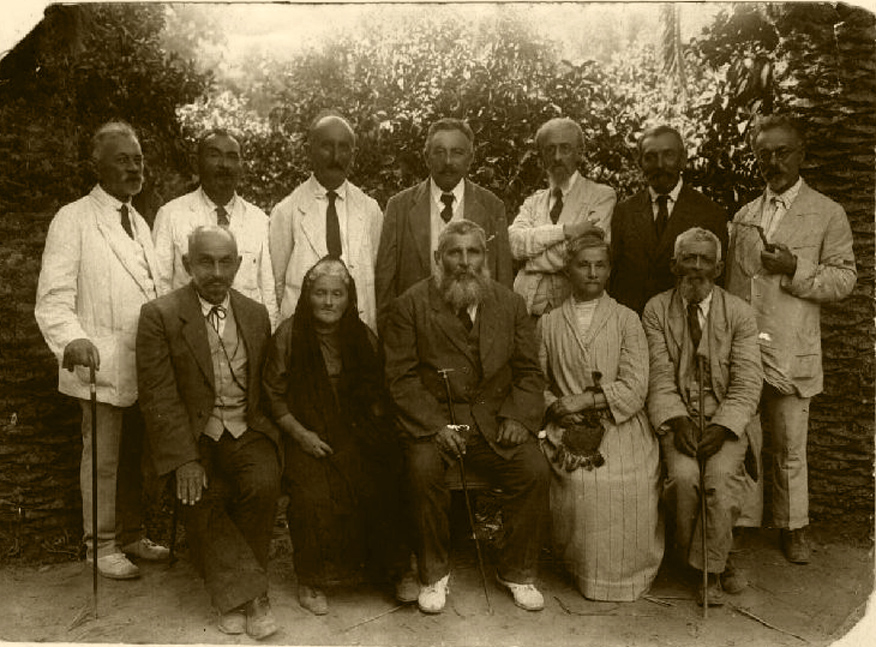
- Yoel Drubin, standing third from left, among fellow Bilu members of Rishon Lezion and Gedera. Rishon, 1898.
- Born: 1857; Kovno, Russian Empire
- Died: 1923 (aged 65–66)
- Occupations: Farmer, community leader
- Known for: Co-founder of Rishon LeZion
- Spouse: Hannah Drubin
- Children: 4 sons, 2 daughters

Yoel Drubin (Hebrew: יואל דרובין; 1857–1923) was a member of the Bilu group and one of the founders of Rishon Lezion.

== Biography ==
Yoel Drubin was born in 1857 in Kovno. In 1882, he joined the Bilu movement and immigrated to Palestine. He helped to establish the Jewish colony of Rishon Lezion along with Israel Belkind, Haim Hissin, David Yudilovitz and other Biluites. While some of the original settlers left in the wake of financial difficulties and personal conflicts, Drubin was among those who remained.

Drubin married Hannah, who was among a group of pioneer women who wrote to Baroness de Rothschild, urging her to convince her husband, Edmond James de Rothschild to reconsider his stance on the financing of the Jewish colonies after a dispute between the colonists and the Baron's administrators.

Drubin played an active role in the public and cultural life of Rishon Lezion in its early days. He was a signatory of the first village charter in 1897. He served as a board member of the council of wineries of Rishon Lezion and Zikhron Yaakov.

== Family and legacy ==
Yoel and Hannah Drubin had four sons and two daughters. His grandson and namesake, Yoel Drubin, was attacked and killed by Arabs on 9 May 1947.

A street in Rishon Lezion commemorates the cofounder of the city.
