= Dov Zur =

Israeli politician (born 1955)

- דב צור
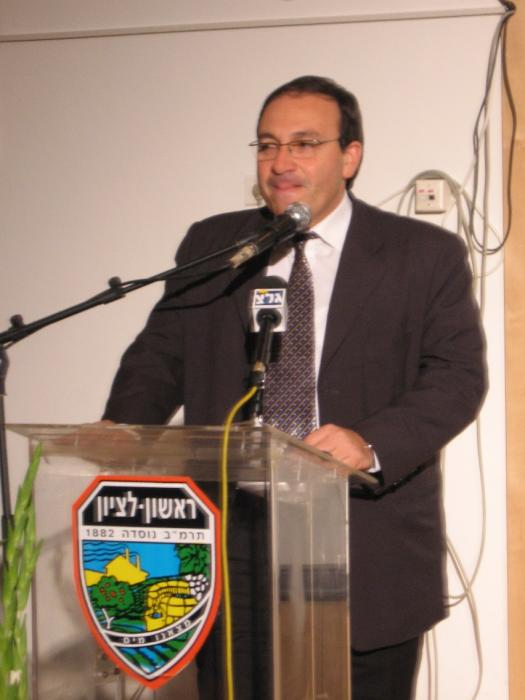

11th mayor of Rishon Letzion
- In office 2008–2018
- Preceded by: Meir Nitzan
- Succeeded by: Raz Kinstlich

Personal details
- Born: 17 October 1955 (age 70) Rishon LeZion, Israel
- Party: Only Rishon
- Education: Tel Aviv University

Dov Zur (Hebrew: דב צור; born 17 October 1955) is an Israeli politician and the former mayor of Rishon LeZion.

== Biography and personal life ==
Zur was born in Rishon LeZion in 1955, to a Syrian mother and Hungarian father.

Zur is a divorcee and father of three children. His partner is Ariela Israeli, who served as head of the Education Administration of Rishon LeZion.

== Political career ==
Zur first ran for the Rishon LeZion City Council in 1993, and was elected. He served as Deputy Mayor under Meir Nitzan, but resigned to serve in the Opposition. In 1998, he ran for Mayor of Rishon LeZion under his own party, "Quality Rishon" (Rishon Shel Echut), He lost to Nitzan, and continued to serve in the opposition. He ran again in 2003 under the Shinui Party, winning 37.55% of the vote.

Zur was elected on November 11, 2008, beating Meir Nitzan, who had served as mayor of Rishon Lezion for 25 years. Zur received 52.75% of the vote.

=== Mayor of Rishon LeZion ===
After becoming mayor of Rishon LeZion, Zur made efforts to cancel construction permits granted by his predecessor, for environmental considerations. He abolished Middle school, extending the length of high school education to 6 years. Zur promoted the construction of the Brown Line of the Tel Aviv Light Rail, and offered to have Municipal authorities help fund the project.

He won re-election in 2013 with 70.7% of the vote.

As part of a real-estate corruption investigation, on December 3, 2017, Tzur was detained for 8 days, on suspicion of accepting bribes, conspiracy to commit a crime, fraud and breach of trust. He was then released into a 10-day house arrest, and prohibited from returning to his duties as Mayor for another 25 days. At the end of January 2018 he resumed his duties under restrictions, and was banned from attending or attending meetings of the Planning and Building Committee, the Tenders Committee, and the city's Economic Society.

He announced he would seek re-election in 2018. He ran against former Deputy Mayor, Raz Kinstlich, winning 31.89% of the vote in the first round to Kinslitch's 21.77%. In the second round, Zur was defeated with 47.37% of the vote against Kinslitch's 52.63%. He announced his retirement from the City Council subsequent to his loss.

In March 2019, the police stated that sufficient evidence had been found to substantiate suspicions that he had committed a bribery offense.

== Honors ==
In 2013 Zur was honored as one of the torchbearers in the national Israeli Independence Day ceremony.
