= Nissim Behar =

Sephardi Jewish educator and Zionist activist

- נסים בכר
- Born: 15 February 1848; Jerusalem, Ottoman Empire
- Died: 1 January 1931 (aged 82)
- Occupations: Educator, Zionist activist
- Organizations: Alliance Israélite Universelle
- Known for: Advocate for modern Hebrew language education, Director of the National Liberal Immigration League

Nissim Behar (Hebrew: נסים בכר; February 15, 1848 – January 1, 1931) was a Sephardi Jewish educator, born in Jerusalem, and long associated with the Alliance Israélite Universelle, both there and in the Diaspora. After receiving his pension, he became a propagandist, in 1899. for the Alliance, and later for early Zionism.

Nissim Behar can be seen as the founder of modern Hebrew language education, largely because Eliezer Ben Yehuda taught Hebrew using the new "direct method". Behar himself learned Hebrew from Ben Yehuda, the 'Father of Spoken Renovated Hebrew' and later became a teacher of modern Hebrew at the Alliance Israélite Universelle in Jerusalem, which he directed from 1882 to 1887. Behar was a strong advocate of the direct method, which prevailed in the further development of Hebrew language education in the framework of the "ulpan" system, that led to the success of Hebrew revival.

In 1901, Behar moved to New York City, where he directed the National Liberal Immigration League (1906 to 1924), to lobby against anti-immigration legislation in the United States. The League was a constant irritation for Louis Marshall of the American Jewish Committee, because it made no effort to hide its Jewish identity in its high-profile activities against restricting immigration. Marshall and the AJC, while similarly opposed to restrictions, felt any public Jewish role would undermine their lobbying campaign and provoke anti-Semitism; the AJC refrained from such public activities on the issue, and Marshall's work was usually confined to behind-the-scenes contacts with individual members of Congress. Behar was an enthusiastic activist for the Zionist idea; he called for the return of the Kotel Hamaaravi, the Wailing Wall, to Jewish hands.
