= Reuven Yudalevich =

Founder of Rishon Le Zion, Israel

- ראובן יודלביץ
- Born: 1862; Kremenchuk, Russian Empire
- Died: 1933 (aged 70–71); Tel Aviv, Mandatory Palestine
- Occupation: Farmer
- Known for: Founder of Rishon Le Zion
- Spouse: Batya Wissel
- Children: Morris Youdelevitz Young, and eight others

Reuven Yudalevich (Yudelevitz, Yudelevitch) (Hebrew: ראובן יודלביץ; 1862–1933), was a funder and founder of the city of Rishon Le Zion, Israel. He was born in Kremenchuk, Russian Empire, to his father Yehuda. He eventually married Batya Wissel, daughter of Avraham Wissel and had one son, Moshe, before leaving the Russian Empire. He received a traditional education and began working as a clerk in a warehouse. He may have been a member of the Hovevei Zion movement.

His generosity began at age twenty when he and his friend purchased a lottery ticket in monthly payments. Eventually his friend could not keep up the payments, so Reuven continued paying for his friend's portion of the lottery. He eventually won a large sum of money and gave half of the winnings to his friend as if his friend had continued paying all along. It is assumed he used the money to then travel to Palestine. He apparently met a group of Bilu pioneers made up of twelve men where, at the port of Smyrna, all of their money was stolen from their cashier, Israel Belkind. Reuven gave them 100 rubles and continued the trip to Palestine. In Jaffa he joined the "Pioneers of Jewish Settlement Committee" or "Halutzey Yesud HaMaala" which eventually bought the land for Rishon Le Zion from Tzvi Leventine. Ten families set up the village and Reuven sent money to get the group of pioneers he had met in Smyrna so that they could purchase passage to Palestine. The migrations at this time to Palestine are known as The First Aliya.

Reuven was considered to be one of the more liberal members of the community and supported the young Biluim Pioneers who came to work in the village and played an active role in public life. He planted a vineyard, built a house, and became a farmer and vine grower. Active in the local council, he was in charge of external relations, street improvements, and sanitation. He was active in politics and his home was known as a center of poetry and classical music. He and Batya had eight more children while living in Rishon Le Zion. His firstborn, Morris Youdelevitz Young, was a notable doctor in Persia.

It is believed that he also participated in the building of Tel Aviv where he moved in 1927. He died in 1933 and was buried in Tel Aviv.
