= Morris Youdelevitz Young =

British medical doctor

- Born: Moshe Youdelevitz; 17 July 1880; Kremenchuk, Russian Empire
- Died: 1950
- Education: University of Glasgow (MBBS); London School of Hygiene & Tropical Medicine
- Occupations: Medical doctor; researcher
- Employer(s): Anglo-Persian Oil Company, St. Mary's Hospital, London
- Known for: Pioneering western medicine in south-west Persia, working with Alexander Fleming
- Father: Reuven Yudalevich

Morris Youdelevitz Young (17 July 1880 – 1950), known as the "little doctor", was a British medical doctor and researcher. He is best known for working at the Anglo-Persian Oil Company and for pioneering Western medicine in south-west Persia. He also worked with Alexander Fleming at the St. Mary's Hospital in London.

== Early life and education ==
Born on 17 July 1880 at Kremenchuk, Russian Empire. He was the first son of eight children of Reuven Yudalevich (1862–1933) and Batya Weisel (1859–1930). At the age of two, he emigrated with his family from Kremenchuk, Russian Empire to Rishon Le Zion, of which his father, Reuven Yudalevich, was a founder. In 1900, he began studying medicine and surgery at the University of Glasgow.

His birth name was Moshe Youdelevitz, but he changed his name during his time at the university. During his studies, in 1903, he worked as a doctor for a railway survey party in Persia. He became a citizen of the United Kingdom on 21 February 1906. He graduated on 17 July 1906 with a Bachelor of Medicine, Bachelor of Surgery.

== Physician in the Anglo-Persian Oil Company ==
In April 1907, Young began work as a physician for Concessions Syndicate Ltd., which eventually became the Anglo-Persian Oil Company in Masjid-i-Suleiman. In 1909, due to being involved with the care of the son of a Bakhtiari clan leader, Shahab-es-Sultana, the relations between the Bakhtiari clans and the oil company improved. The improved relations and subsequent usage of the clans as a guard led to Young being appointed a political officer in addition to his medical duties in 1911. During a sabbatical from May–July 1910, Young studied at the London School for Tropical Medicine (now the London School of Hygiene & Tropical Medicine). During this time, Young declined a job offer for West Africa with better pay but chose to stay on at the oil company with an increase in salary. In 1924, Young was responsible for the medical department including employee health and medical staff training. The medical activities of Young and the medical department focused primarily on the industry and its workers but also spread to the surrounding local inhabitants. Young left Persia in 1927 and retired officially from APOC in 1931. He consulted as a medical advisor and political officer for a number of years after his retirement.

== St. Mary's and Alexander Fleming ==
Between 1931 and 1935, Young worked as a physician and researcher at St. Mary's Hospital, Paddington with Alexander Fleming. During this time, he published two journal articles with Fleming. During World War II, Young worked at the Emergency Pathological Service for District Six. Young died in 1950 after resigning from St. Marys in 1949.
