= Raz Kinstlich =

Israeli politician

- רז קינסטליך
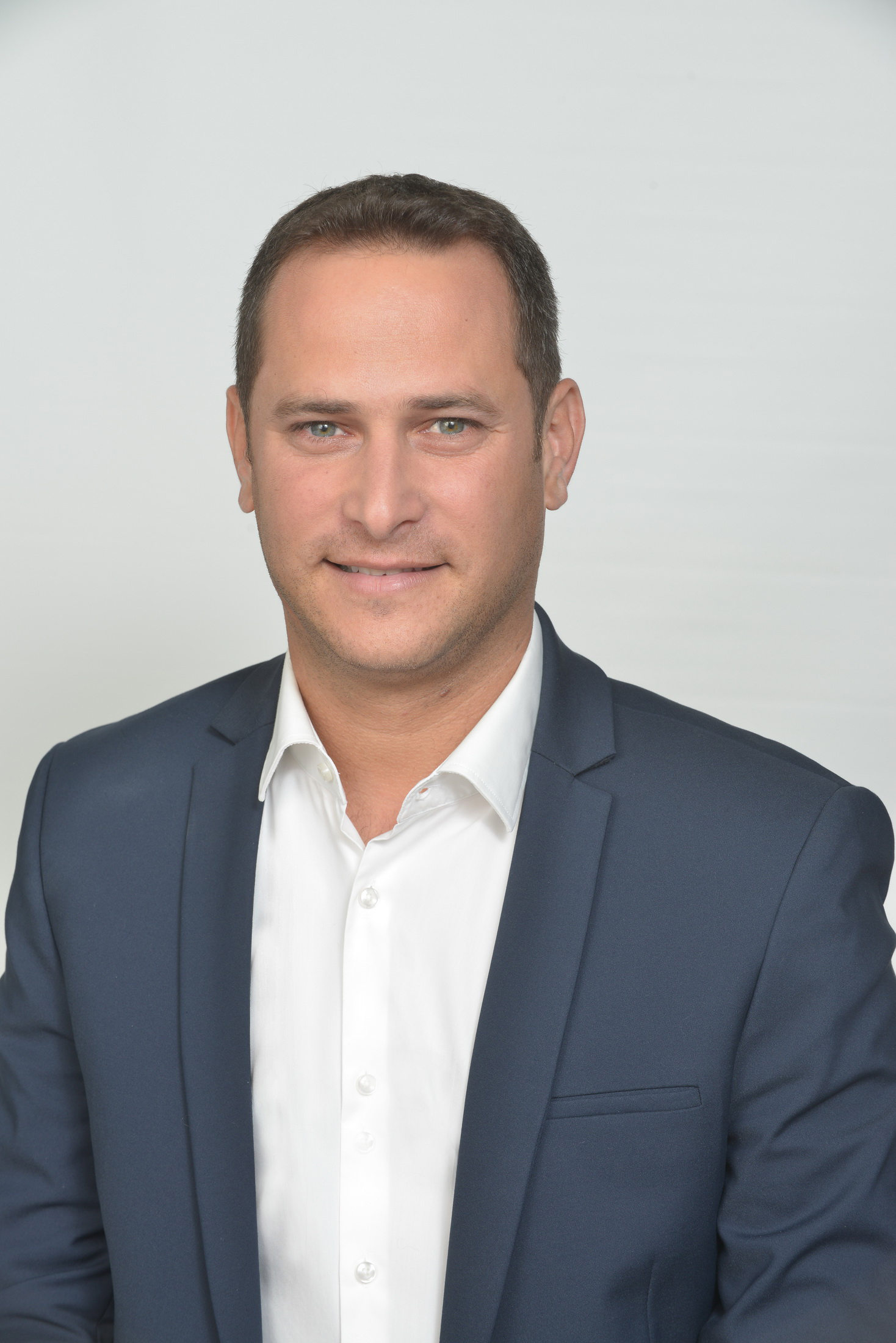

12th Mayor of Rishon LeZion
- Incumbent
- Assumed office 2018
- Preceded by: Dov Zur

Personal details
- Born: March 27, 1978 (age 48) Rishon LeZion, Israel
- Party: The Greens + The Youngs
- Education: B.A. Business Management & Marketing at College of Management Academic Studies

Raz Kinstlich (Hebrew: רז קינסטליך; born March 27, 1978) is an Israeli politician and the mayor of Rishon LeZion since 2018.

== Biography ==
Kinstlich was born and raised in Rishon Lezion, being the son of Aliza and Pinchas Kinstlich, a former soccer player for Maccabi Petah Tikva. He graduated from Rishon Lezion Gimnasia Realit majoring in chemistry. He did his military service in the Air Defence Command in the Air Force. After his service in the IDF, he studied for a bachelor's degree in business administration and marketing.

Kinstlich was elected to the city council for the first time when he was only 25 years old. Upon his election, he established the first youth portfolio in a local authority in the State of Israel, designed to promote the rights of the city's youth. At the same time, he served as a political advisor to the mayor of Ariel, Ron Nachman.

In 2008 he joined Asaf Daabul's faction and was placed third in their list. The list won four mandates and Kinstlich was elected to the council.

In the 2013 elections, the "Greens + the Young" faction won three mandates and became the second faction in the Rishon Lezion City Council and Kinstlich began to serve as deputy mayor and later as acting mayor. As part of his position, he was responsible for environmental quality, urban security and was acting chairman of the board of the Rishon LeZion municipal company for security and public order.

In the 2018 mayoral elections, he qualified for the second round with 21% compared to the current mayor, Dov Tzur, who received 31%. In the second round Kinstlich paired with Lial Ibn-Zahar who won with 19.48% (20,128 votes). In addition to that, Moti Ajami, who also ran for mayor in the elections, announced his support for Kinstlich. They ran together under the slogan "making a change - winning together". On November 13, 2018, Kinstlich was elected mayor of Rishon LeZion after beating Tzur in the second round by a margin of about 5% of the votes. After the elections Kinstlich appointed Ibn Zohar and Ajami as his deputies and substitutes. Asaf Daabul, who was a member of his faction 10 years before, also became a member of the Kinstlich coalition.
