= Meir Nitzan =

Israeli politician (1931–2025)

- מאיר ניצן
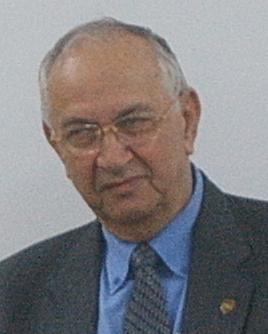

10th Mayor of Rishon LeZion
- In office 1983–2008
- Preceded by: Hanania Gibstein
- Succeeded by: Dov Zur

Personal details
- Born: 18 May 1931 Bucharest, Romania
- Died: 19 April 2025 (aged 93) Rishon LeZion, Israel
- Party: Kadima (2008)

Meir Nitzan (Hebrew: מאיר ניצן; 18 May 1931 – 19 April 2025) was an Israeli politician. He was mayor of Rishon LeZion for five consecutive terms.

== Background ==
Meir Nitzan was born in Bucharest, Romania as Meir Mintz. He lived in a displaced persons' camp in Cyprus before making Aliyah at age 16. Upon his arrival in Israel, he lived in the then-transit camp Pardes Hanna. In the Israel Defense Forces, Nitzan served in the Ordnance Corps and reached the rank of colonel. He retired in 1979, but returned upon a promotion to brigadier general as the deputy head of the Technological and Logistics Directorate.

Nitzan died in Rishon LeZion on 19 April 2025, at the age of 93.

== Political career ==
Nitzan became mayor of Rishon LeZion in 1983 and was re-elected four times. In November 2008, he lost the municipal elections to Dov Zur. After his defeat, Nitzan announced that he would run in the Kadima party primaries and vie for a seat in the Knesset in the 2009 elections. However, he later left the party to support Likud as he was unhappy with the behaviour of party leader Tzipi Livni. Kadima claimed Nitzan quit because the party refused to cover his campaign debts.

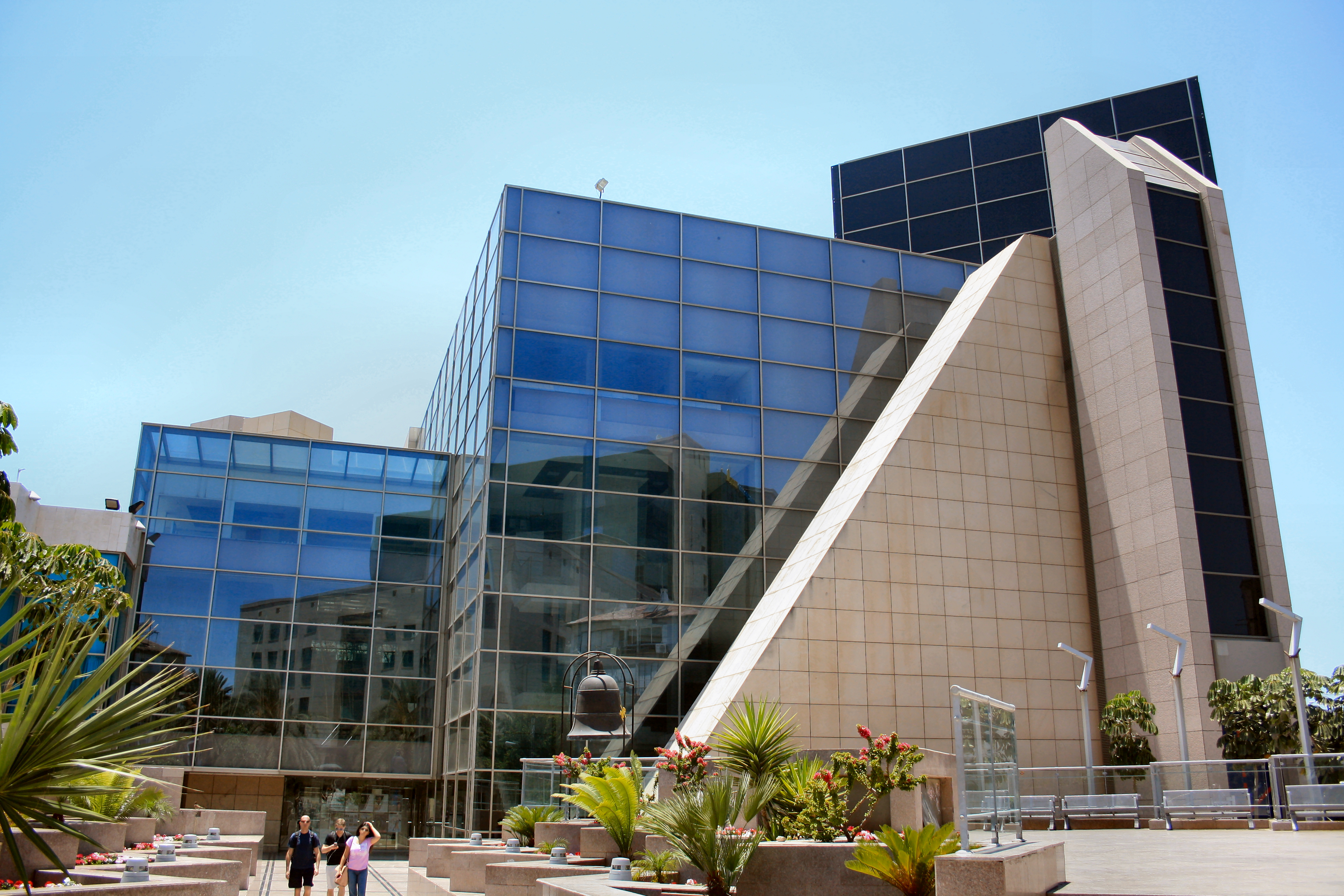
Meir Nitzan Auditorium, Rishon Lezion

Nitzan served as acting mayor of Lod in 2011–2013. During his tenure, the crime rate dropped, the municipality organized a sulha, a traditional Arab conciliatory meeting between two feuding families, and the budget was balanced.
