= Haviv Elementary School =

Haviv school
- בית הספר חביב
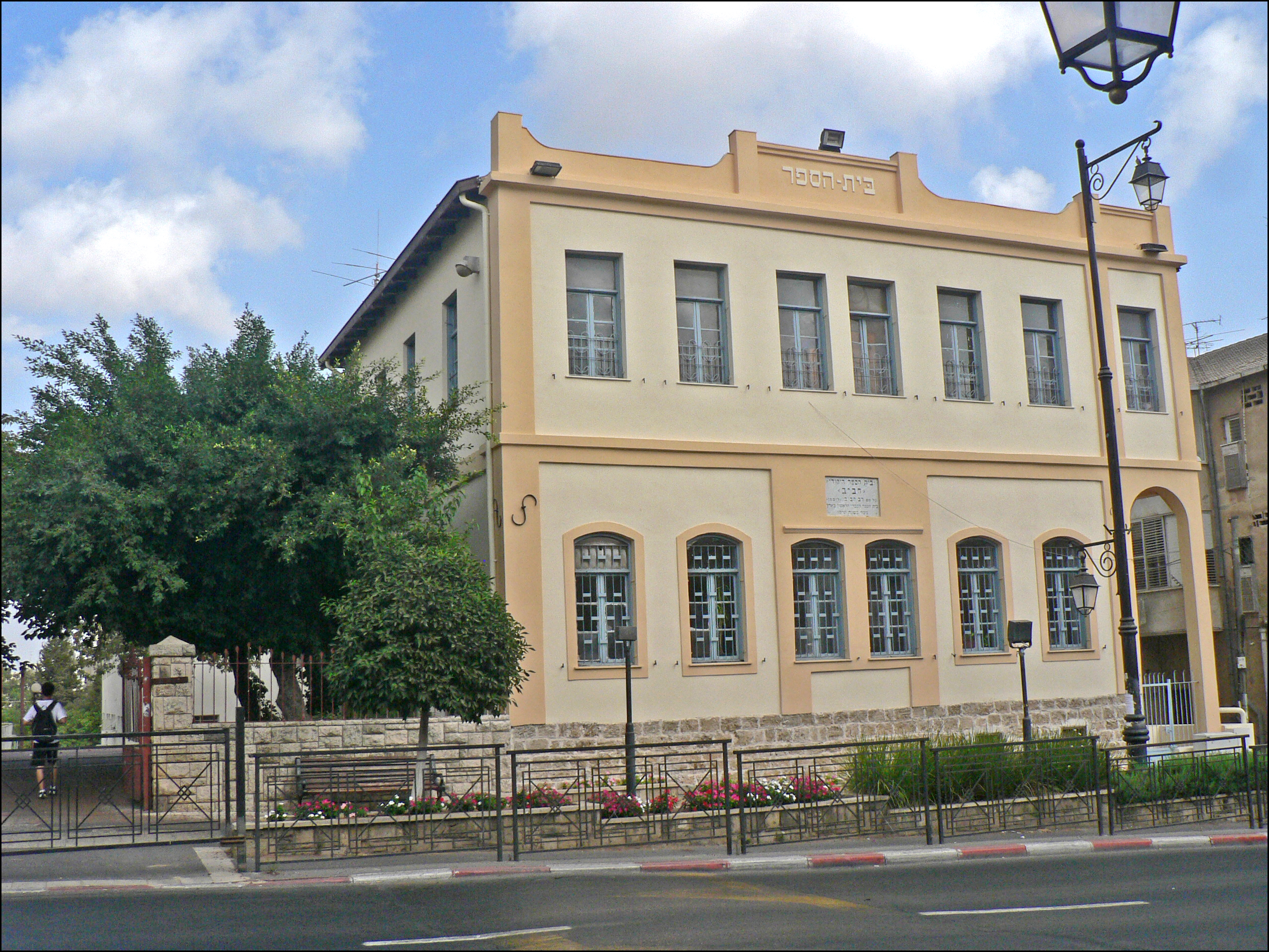

Location
- Rishon Lezion; Israel
- Coordinates: 31.9637°N 34.8078°E

Information
- Motto: מדברים בשפה שלך (Speaking your language)
- Established: 1886
- Principal: Anat Rachmanov
- Enrollment: 539 (2010 - 2011 school year)
- Song: חלום שהתגשם (A dream come true)
- Website: http://www.haviv.rlz.org.il

Haviv elementary school (Hebrew: בית הספר חביב) is the first school in modern times to use Hebrew as the medium of instruction.

It was established in 1886 in Rishon LeZion and is still active to this day.

== History ==
Ever since the establishment of Rishon LeZion the question of education for the children of the village was raised. In 1882, when the village was established, Aharon Mordehai Freiman invited a Melamed from Hebron named Rappaport Tuvia Haim in which he taught the boys of the village in a tent in his yard. He taught Torah, Mishnah and Talmud while they were sitting on the floor around a low table. Later their place of study was moved to the basements of the founders of the village Shraga Fayvel and Dov Fishelzon, Math. The French language was also added to the curriculum.

In 1886, the population of Rishon LeZion was about 300, of which several dozen were children who needed proper education, so the establishment of a modern school was proposed. However, this was difficult due to the lack of experienced teachers, the lack of textbooks in Hebrew and mixed gender education which was not yet accepted.

The school was established in the center of Rishon LeZion near the great synagogue for girls only. The boys studied in the basement of the synagogue. The school had no name and was simply known as "The school". Mordechai Lubman was appointed the school's first principal by the baron's clerks.

Many teachers of the time wrote textbooks themselves due to the lack of textbooks in Hebrew. The teachers had to create new words in Hebrew for tools and terms that did not exist at the time of the Bible. The "reviver of the Hebrew language" Eliezer Ben-Yehuda was a teacher in the school and wrote textbooks as well. Because the school taught exclusively in Hebrew, it is considered the world's first school to teach in Modern Hebrew.

In 1901, the principal Israel Belkind decided to allow the school to teach both boys and girls.

In 1920, the school was named "Haviv School", named after Dov Lubman Haviv, who was the former chairman of the local council of Rishon LeZion.

== Notable graduates ==
- Boaz Toporovsky
- Yair Golan
- Linoy Ashram

== See also ==
- Herzliya Hebrew Gymnasium
- Education in Israel
