= David Yudilovitz =

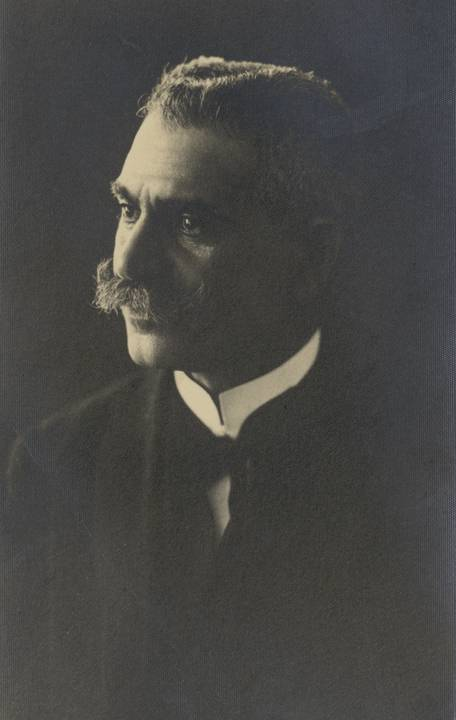
- Yudilovitz c. 1930s
- Born: 1863; Iași, Romanian United Principalities
- Died: 1943 (aged 79–80); Rishon Le-Zion, Mandatory Palestine
- Occupations: Zionist activist, Teacher
- Known for: Involvement in the Hovevei Zion, contributions to Jewish national culture in Palestine, association with Eliezer Ben-Yehuda

David Yudilovitz (Hebrew: דוד יודילוביץ; 1863–1943) was a Zionist activist with the Hovevei Zion and teacher in Rishon Le-Zion. He was a friend and colleague of Eliezer Ben-Yehuda.

== Biography ==
Yudilovitz settled in Palestine in 1882 with the Bilu'im during the First Aliyah. He compared the state of the Yishuv following the First Aliyah to "the time of the building of the Tower of Babel". Within the Yishuv he joined a small circle of committed activists who pursued the goal of a national culture for Jews. Owing to their activism, this process was underway by the time World War I started.

Yudilovitz was one of the Zionist activists who saw the value of a national culture at a time the Yishuv lacked a unified national character. The diversity and difference within the Jewish community of Palestine after the First Aliyah was a crisis that could not be resolved by a Jewish return to the land without the cultural foundation for a nationalist solution to the ethnic, cultural and linguistic heterogeneity that many were dissatisfied with in Jewish Palestine.
