= Rishon LeZion =

Coordinates: 31°57′N 34°48′E

Rishon LeZion רִאשׁוֹן לְצִיּוֹן
- City (from 1950)

Hebrew transcription(s)
  - ISO 259: Riˀšon l Ṣiyon
  - Translit.: Rishon LeTziyon
  - Also spelled: Rishon LeZiyyon (official)
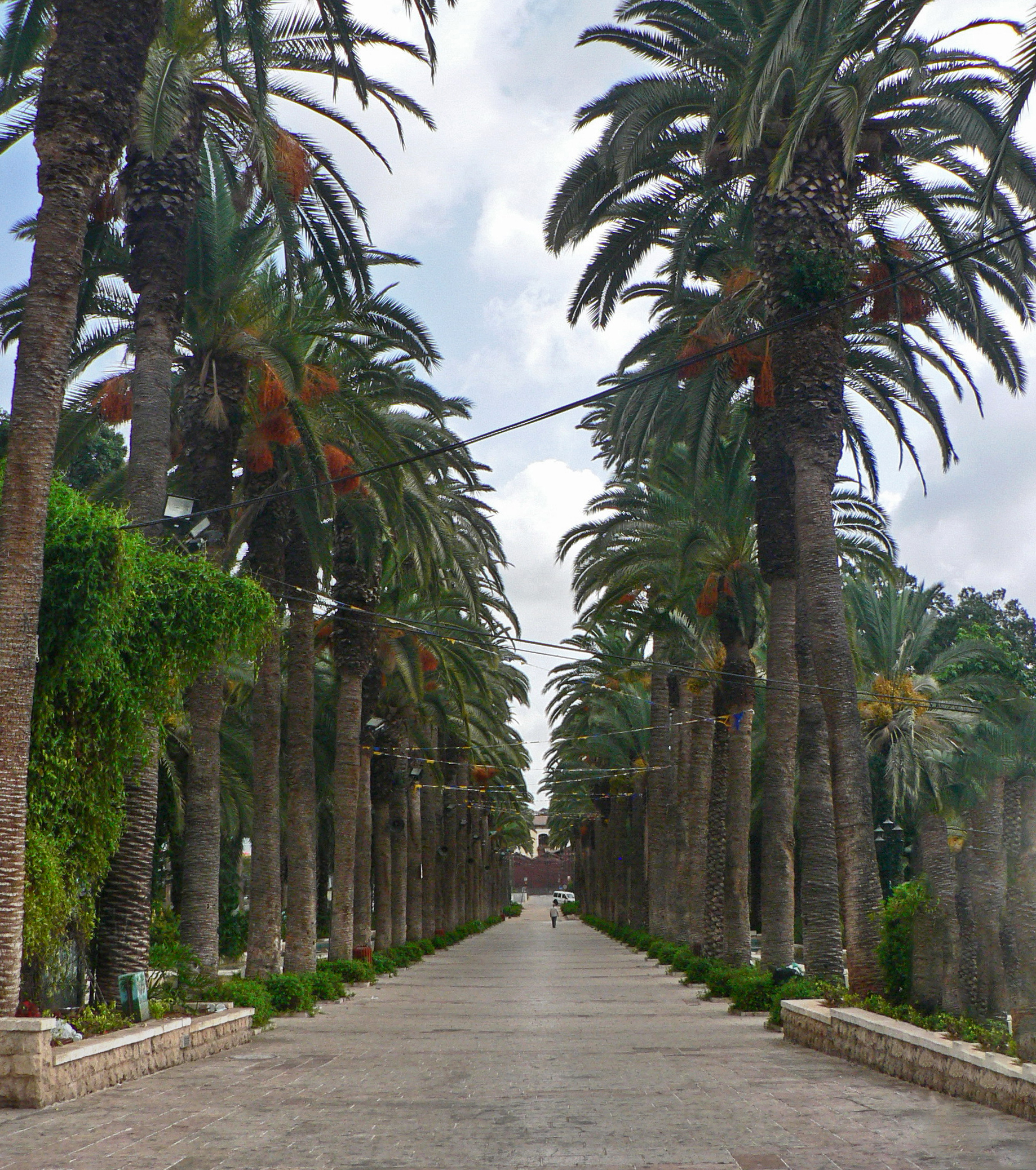
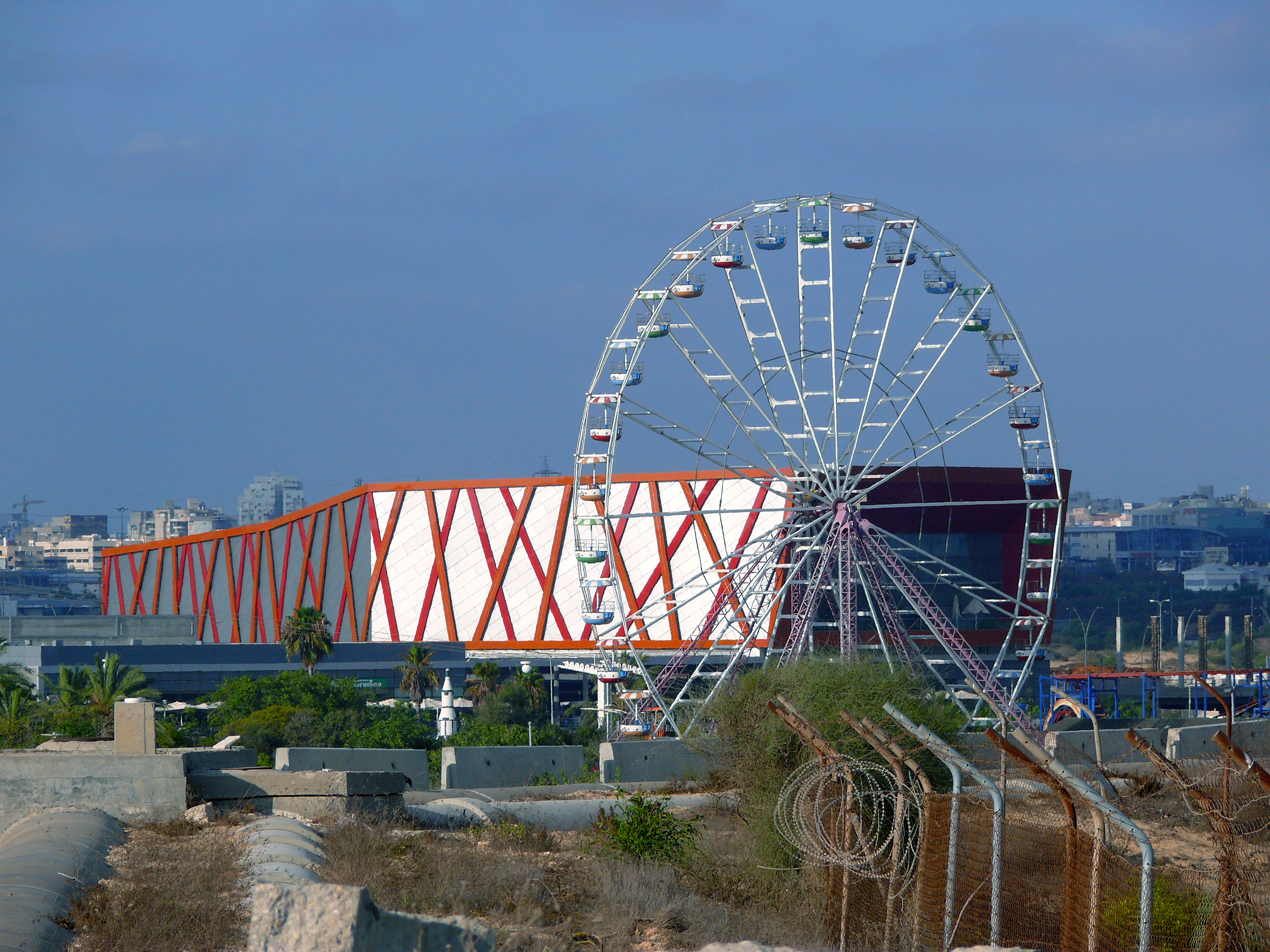
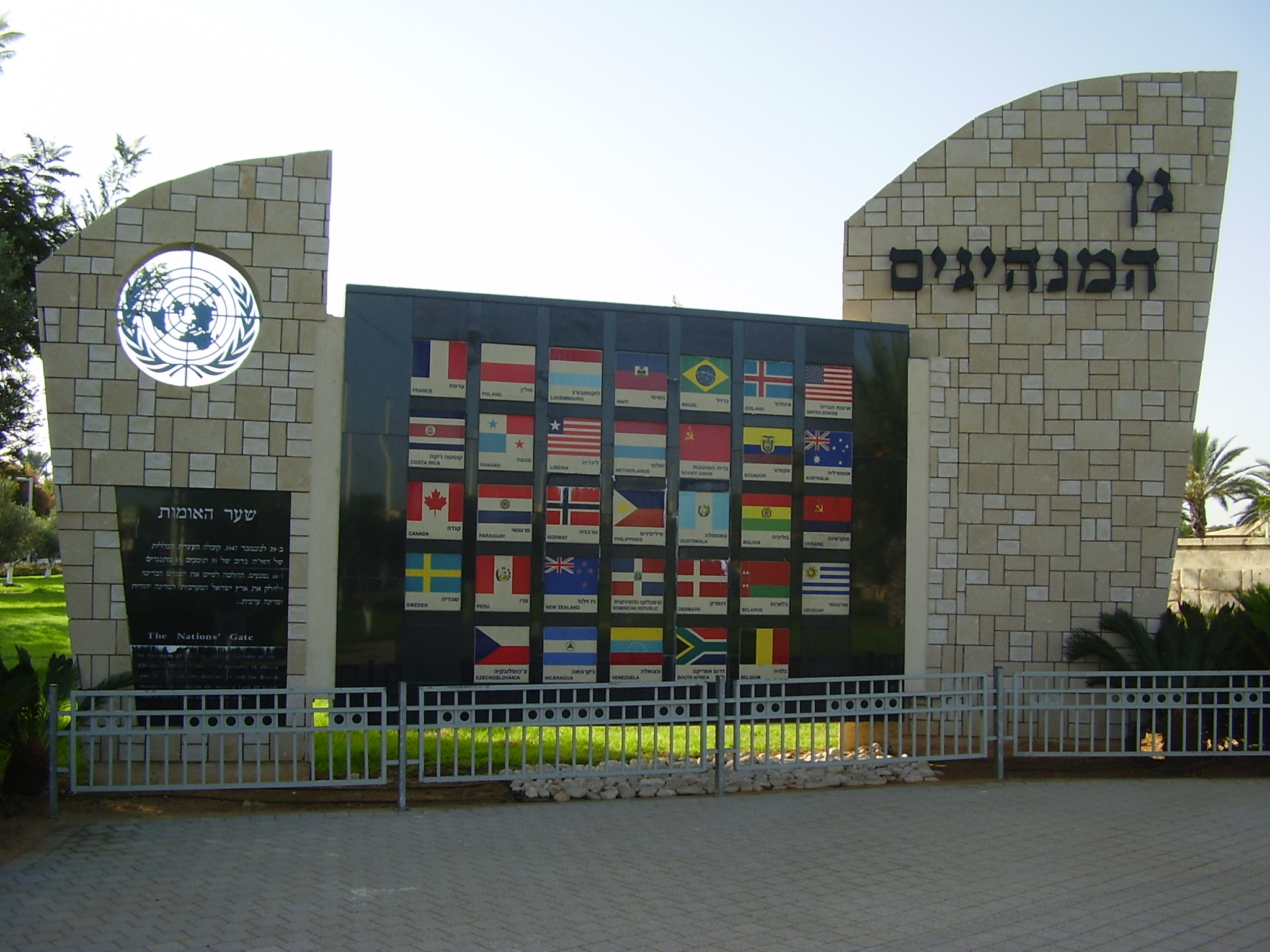
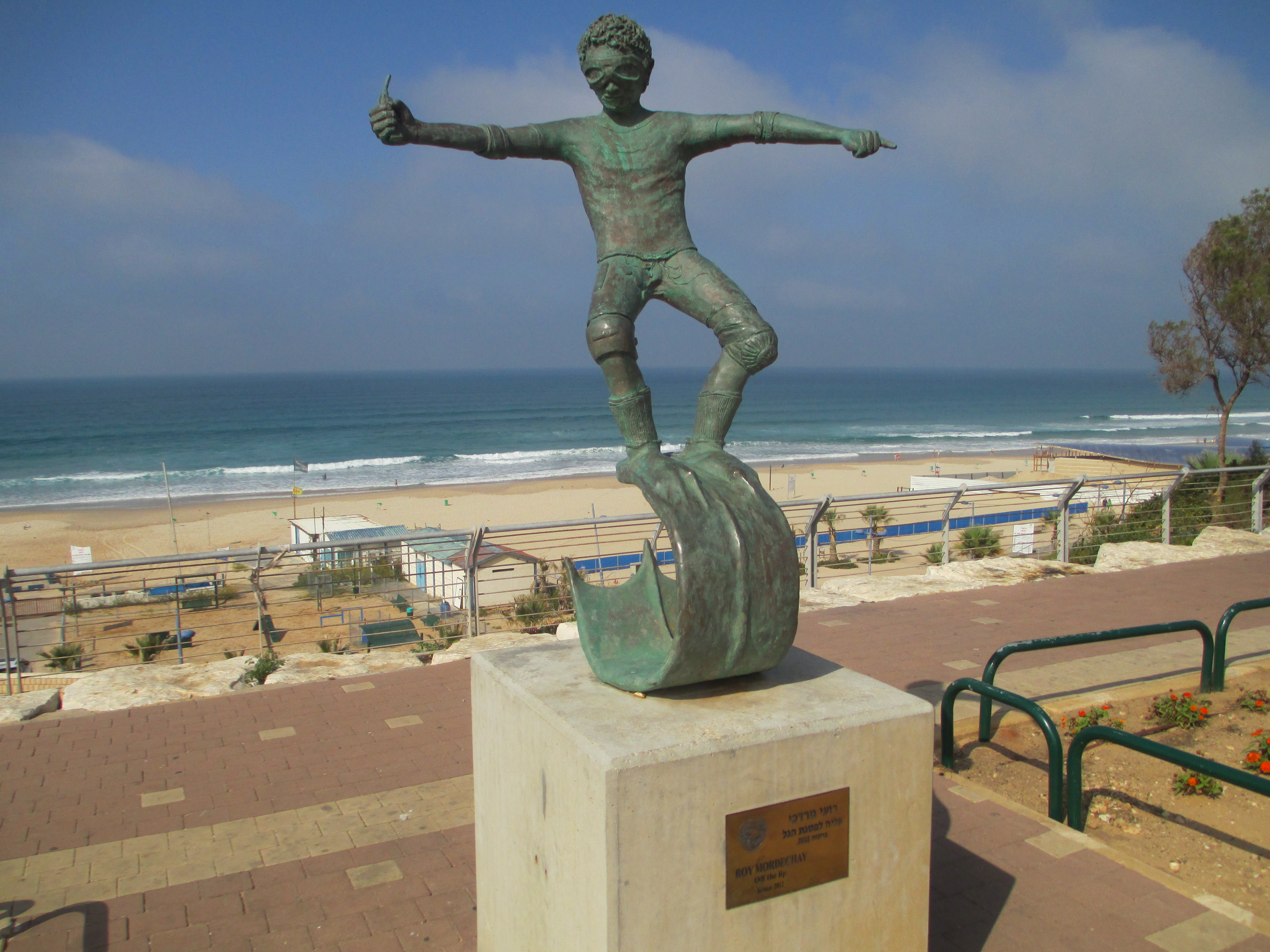
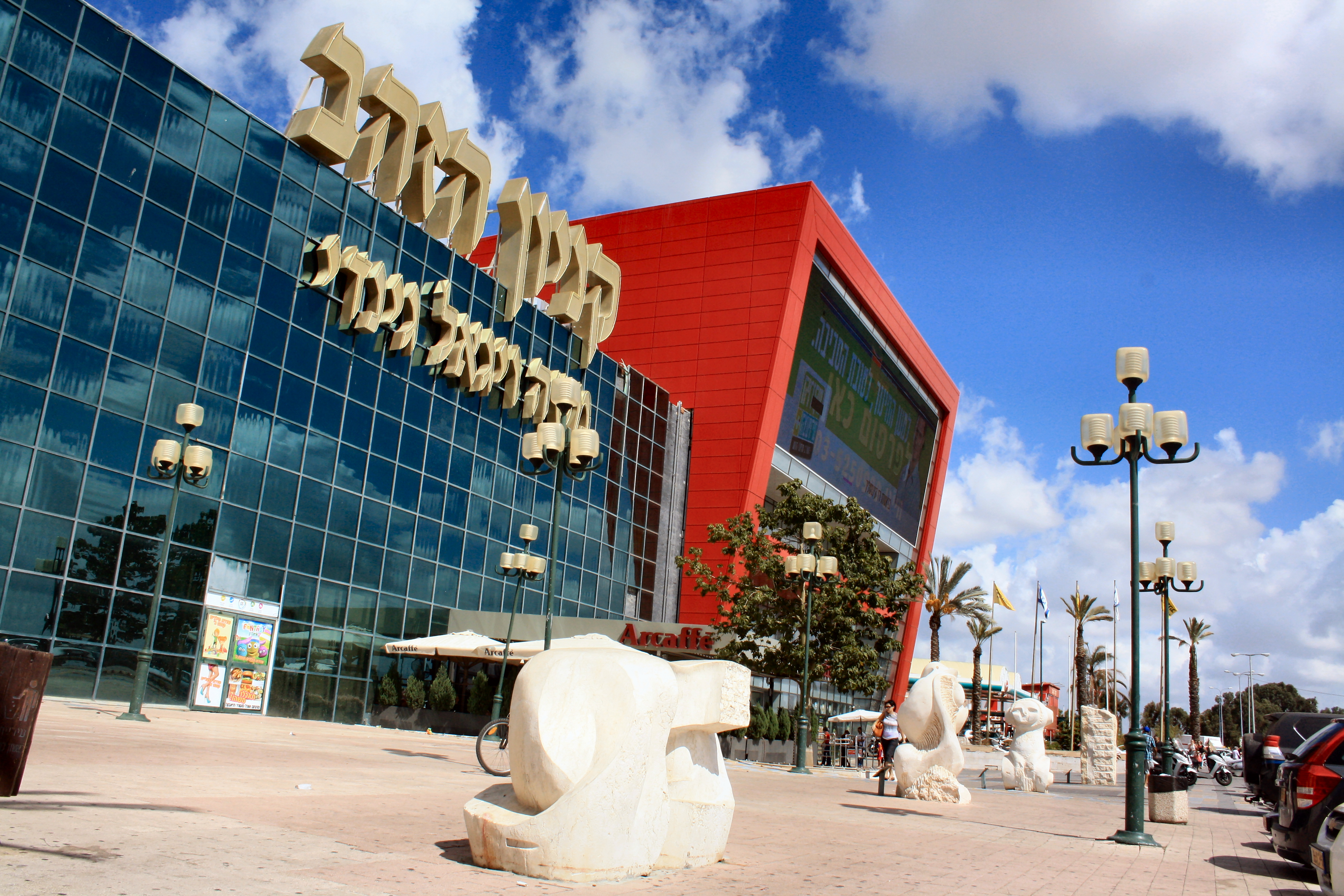
- From up to the left: Palm Tree Boulevards, The Superland and Yes Planet, Leader's Park, 'Off the lip' Sculpture, Gold Mall

- Flag Coat of arms
- Interactive map of Rishon LeZion
- Location within Central Israel Location within Israel
- Country: Israel
- District: Central
- Subdistrict: Rehovot
- Natural Region: Rishon LeZion
- Founded: 1882; 144 years ago

Government
  - Mayor: Raz Kinstlich

Area
  - Total: 61,910 dunams (61.91 km^{2}; 23.90 sq mi)

Population (2024)
  - Total: 259,275
  - Density: 4,188/km^{2} (10,850/sq mi)

Ethnicity
  - Jews: 89.9%
  - Arabs: 0.1%
  - Others: 10%
- Name meaning: First to Zion

Rishon LeZion (Hebrew: רִאשׁוֹן לְצִיּוֹן (audio), lit. "First to Zion") is a city in Israel, located along the central Israeli coastal plain eight kilometres (5 mi) south of Tel Aviv. It is part of the Gush Dan metropolitan area. With a population of 259,275 as of 2024, Rishon LeZion is the fifth-largest city in Israel.

Founded in 1882 by Jewish immigrants from the Russian Empire who were part of the First Aliyah, it was the first settlement founded in Israel by the New Yishuv and the second Jewish farm settlement established in Ottoman Syria in the 19th century, after Petah Tikva.

The city is a member of Forum 15, which is an association of fiscally autonomous cities in Israel that do not depend on national balancing or development grants.

== Etymology ==
The name Rishon LeZion is derived from a verse from the Tanakh: "First to Zion are they, and I shall give herald to Jerusalem" (Hebrew: רִאשׁוֹן לְצִיּוֹן הִנֵּה הִנָּם וְלִירוּשָׁלִַם מְבַשֵּׂר אֶתֵּן) (Isaiah 41:27) and literally translates as "First to Zion".

== History ==
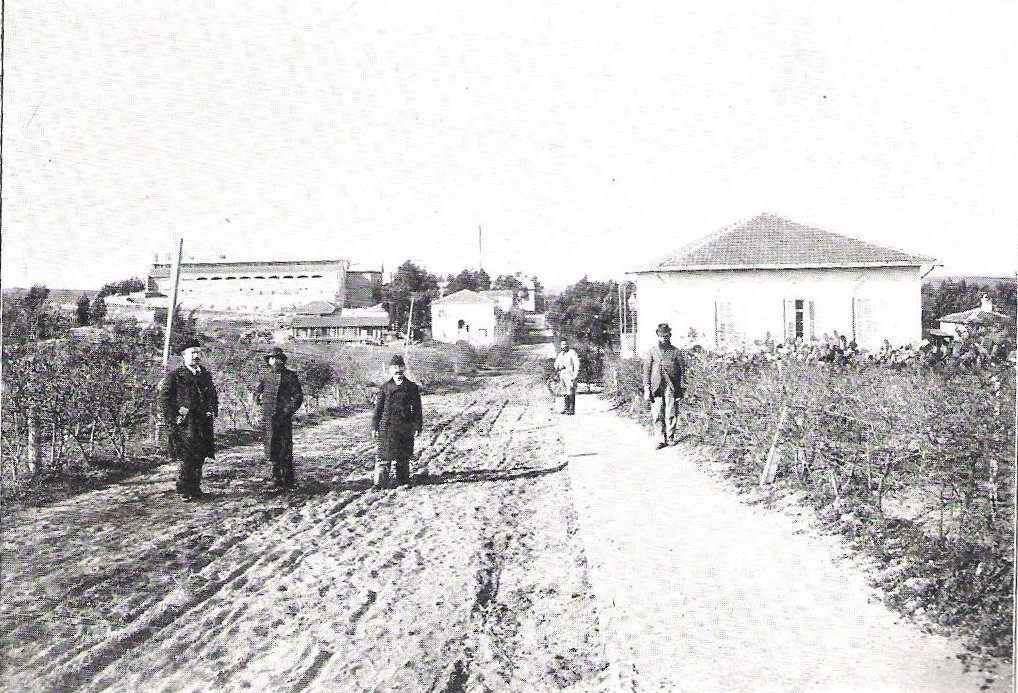
Rishon LeZion in the 1890s

=== Ottoman period (1882–1900) ===
Rishon LeZion in 1937

Rishon LeZion was founded on 31 July 1882, by ten Lovers of Zion pioneers from Kharkiv, Ukraine (then the Russian Empire) headed by Zalman David Levontin. Reuven Yudalevich was also a member of the group. The British vice-consul in Jaffa, Haim Amzaleg, purchased 835 acres (337.91 ha) of land southeast of present-day Tel Aviv, the site of watering holes called ‘Uyūn Qārā (literally 'fountain of the crier') from Mustafa Abdallah ali Dajan. According to Marom, ‘Uyūn Qārā offered "a convenient launching pad for early land purchase initiatives which shaped the pattern of Jewish settlement until the beginning of the British Mandate". Amzaleg signed a declaration to the settlers stating that none of the structures on this land would ever be his own.

In addition to the problems posed by sandy soil and lack of water, the newcomers had no agricultural experience. Baron Rothschild brought in experts who drilled for water, finding the groundwater table uneven. Wells were built at a depth of 20–25 meters.

After the Biluim arrived, the town slowly began to develop. On 23 February 1883, the settlers found water in the wells. To mark this occasion, the village emblem was inscribed with a verse from the Torah: "We have found water." (Genesis 26:32) Fani Belkind, Israel Belkind, Shimshon Belkind, Yoel Drubin, Haim Hissin, and David Yudilovich were among the Biluim who arrived in Rishon Lezion at this time.

In 1883, Itzhak Leib Toporovski a blacksmith of the young village created the first iron plow in the land of Israel, and in 1885 the flag that would later become the flag of Israel was raised for the first time as part of the celebrations of the 3rd anniversary of the village.

When Baron Edmond James de Rothschild took over, sending in his administrators and agricultural guide Shaul Helzner of Mikve Israel, major progress was made in the spheres of agriculture, citrus and viticulture. In November 1883 the first rows were planted, led by ten Russian farmers who were further trained at Mikveh Israel agriculture school, also funded in part by Rothschild. The Great Synagogue, which became a major focus of life in Rishon LeZion, was built between 1885 and 1889. Under Rothschild's patronage, the Carmel-Mizrahi Winery was, established in 1886. The Baron Edmond James de Rothschild and his wife Adelheid von Rothschild came to visit the village a year later in 1887.

In 1886, as Rishon LeZion's population of around 300 included several dozen children who required proper education, the Haviv elementary school was established in Rishon LeZion as the first modern school to teach exclusively in Hebrew. Dov Lubman Haviv taught there and Mordechai Lubman Haviv was an educational inspector. Eliezer Ben-Yehuda, the leading figure in the revival of Hebrew, was a teacher in Rishon LeZion, as was his colleague David Yudilovitz. In 1898, the first Hebrew kindergarten in the world was established by Esther (Shapira) Ginzburg a former student of the Haviv school.

Naphtali Herz Imber, the later famed Hebrew language poet, lived in Rishon LeZion for a few years in the late 1880s. He recited his poem, Tikvahtenu, to eager ears. In 1887, Shmuel Cohen, a young resident of Rishon with a musical background, observed the emotional response of the local Jewish farmers to Imber's poem. Using his musical skill, he put the poem to music. Cohen's musical composition was an adaptation of a Moldavian/Romanian folk song, "Carul cu Boi" ("The Cart with Oxen"). The catalyst of Cohen's musical adaptation facilitated the quick, enthusiastic spread of Imber's poem throughout all the Zionist communities of Mandatory Palestine. Within a short few years, it spread globally to pro-Zionist communities and organizations becoming the unofficial Zionist National Anthem.

In 1933, at the 18th Zionist Congress in Prague, the Imber/Cohen Zionist National Anthem, formally adopted, was renamed the Hatikvah (The Hope). In November 2004, the State of Israel formally adopted Shmuel Cohen's 1887 musical adaptation to a newly shortened, modified version of Imber's poem, creating the modern Israeli National Anthem, the Hatikvah.

In 1888, the medicine house, the baron's stables, and the baron's clerks house were built. In 1889 the building in which the Carmel-Mizrahi Winery is located was built. A telephone was added to the winery in 1891 and in 1898 electricity was installed. In 1890, a palm boulevard was planted in the location of the future city park. The Rishon LeZion orchestra was established in 1895. In 1898, the year Theodor Herzl visited the settlement, the city park (then the village park) was established and a water tower was built next to the well.

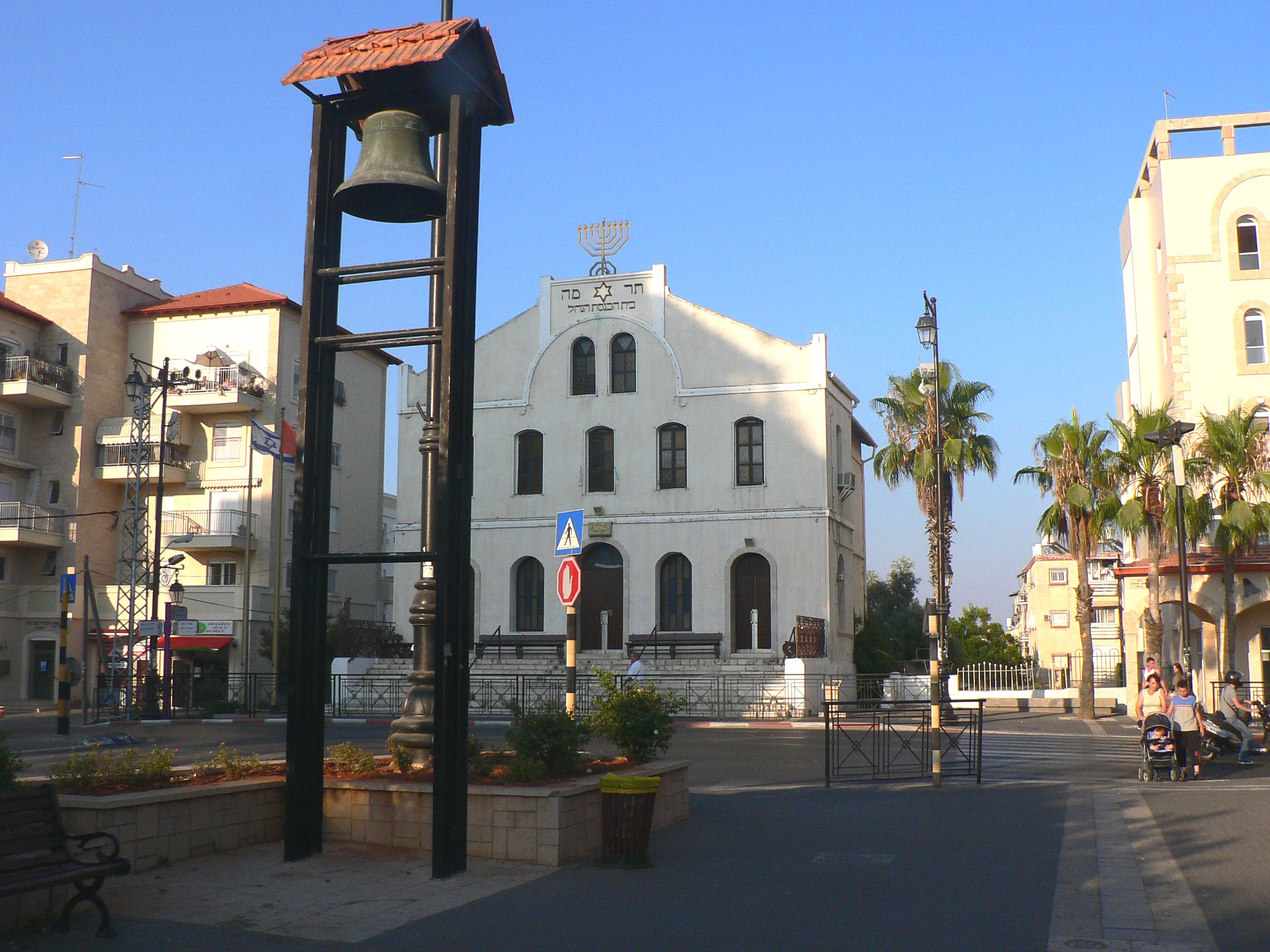
Great Synagogue, founders square, and village bell

A founder of Rishon LeZion was Joseph Feinberg the father of Dora Bloch.

At the year of its founding in 1882, Rishon LeZion had a population of 150. In 1890, Rishon LeZion had a population of 359. Five years later, the figure had risen to 380, and by 1900, to 526.

=== Village council and JCA administration (1900–1922) ===
In 1900, the management of the village was transferred from the baron's office to the village council and the Jewish Colonization Association. Israel's first Prime Minister, David Ben-Gurion, worked in the winery for two months in the summer of 1907.

In 1910, the village bell was constructed next to the medicine house, and in 1912 the first car ("First chariot without horses") appeared in the village. In 1911, 4,000 dunams of land in Rishon LeZion were planted with grapes and 254 dunams with other fruit orchards.

In 1913, the governor of Greater Syria, Djemal Pasha, annexed the sands around Rishon Lezion to their territory and in 1915 Rishon Lezion was expanded again and was given the territory between it and the Mediterranean Sea. In 1913, Nahlat Yehuda, another Jewish settlement, was established north of Rishon Lezion. In 1915 Rishon Lezion and the surrounding area experienced a Locust attack.

Ayun Kara was the scene of a bloody battle between Turkish and New Zealand troops on 14 November 1917. Local citizens carried the wounded to a medical facility in Rishon LeZion. A stone cenotaph was erected by the people of Rishon LeZion to the memory of the New Zealanders who fell that day, but it has since been destroyed.

In the wake of the battle, the New Zealanders set up camp at Rishon Lezion, which was described by one officer as a "pretty little hamlet surrounded by vineyards and orange groves." Relations between the troops and villagers were good, and the troops brought the villagers the news of the Balfour Declaration.

In 1919, the women of Rishon Lezion were given voting rights and in the same year, Nehama Pohatchevsky was elected chairman of the village council which marked the first time a woman was elected to the position.

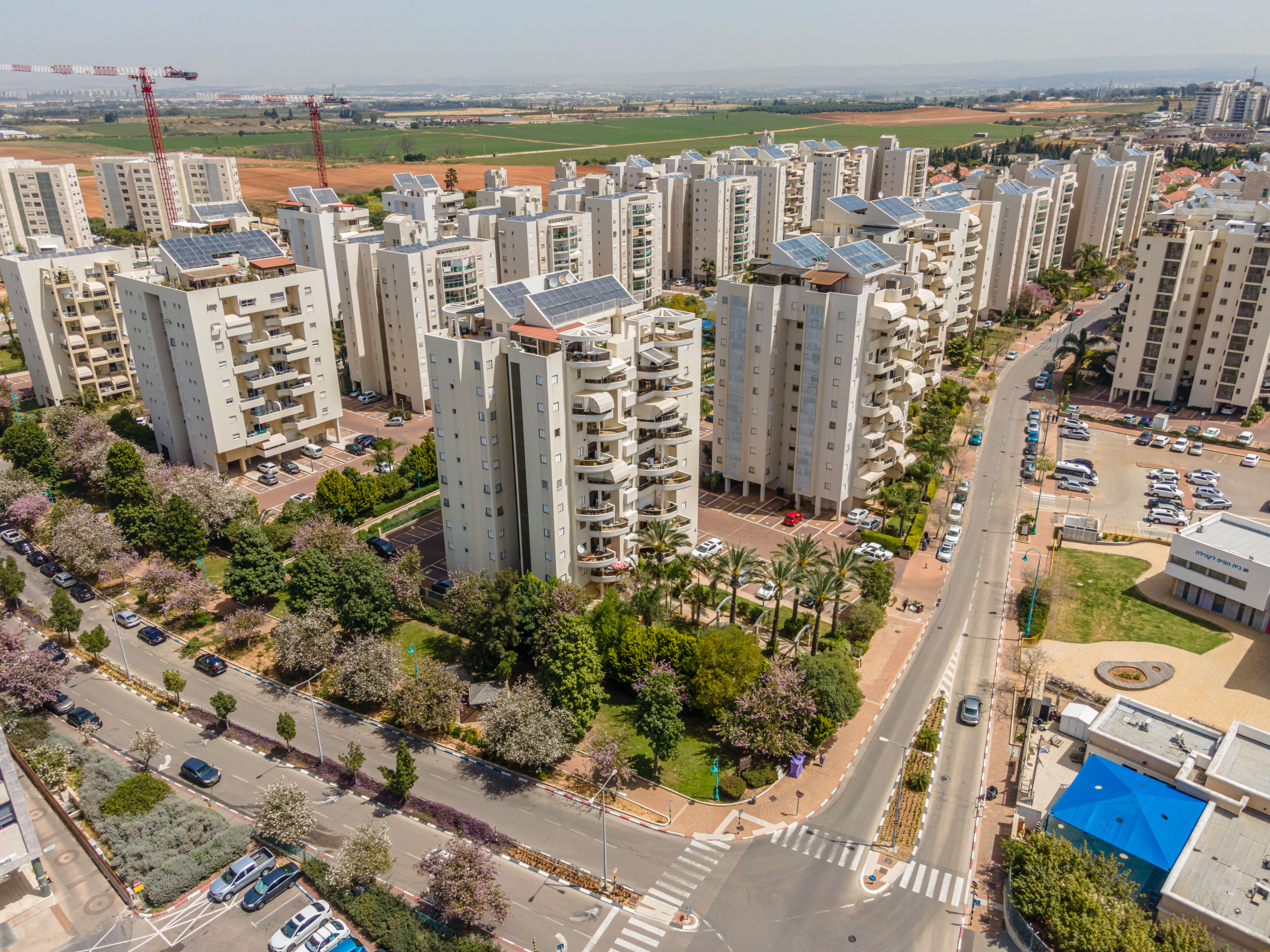
Residential neighborhood in Rishon LeZion

=== British Mandate ===
In 1924, the British Army contracted the Jaffa Electric Company for wired electric power to the military installations in Sarafand. The contract allowed the Electric Company to extend the grid beyond the original geographical limits that had been projected by the concession it was given. The high-tension line that exceeded the limits of the original concession ran along some major towns and agricultural settlements, offering extended connections to the Jewish settlements of Rishon Le-Zion, Nes-Ziona and Rehovot (despite their proximity to the high-tension line, the Arab towns of Ramleh and Lydda remained unconnected). According to a census conducted in 1922 by the British Mandate authorities, Rishon LeZion had a population of 1,396 inhabitants, consisting of 1,373 Jews and 23 Muslims, increasing in 1931 census to 2,525 inhabitants, in 648 houses.

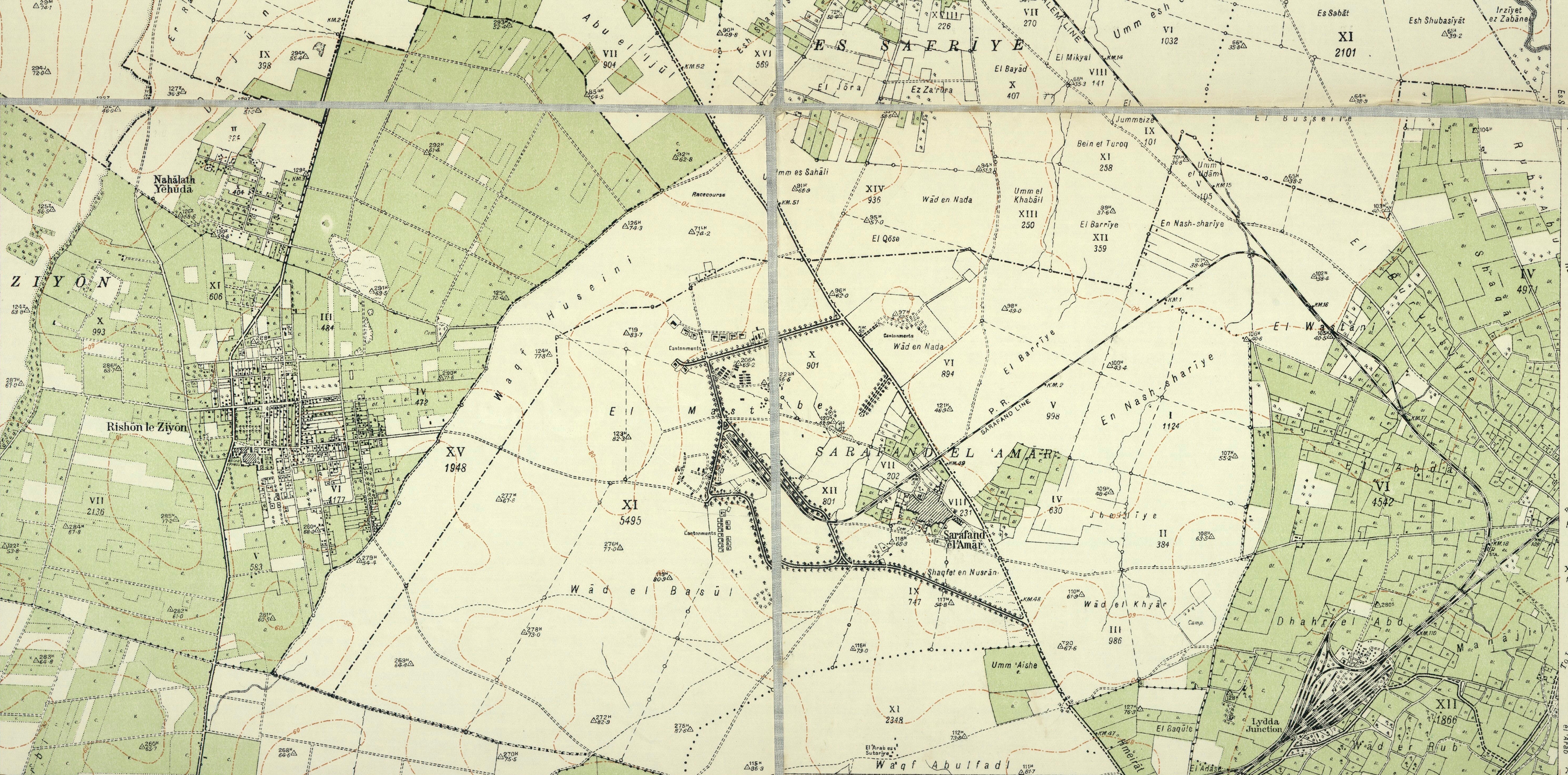
Rishon LeZion 1929 1:20,000

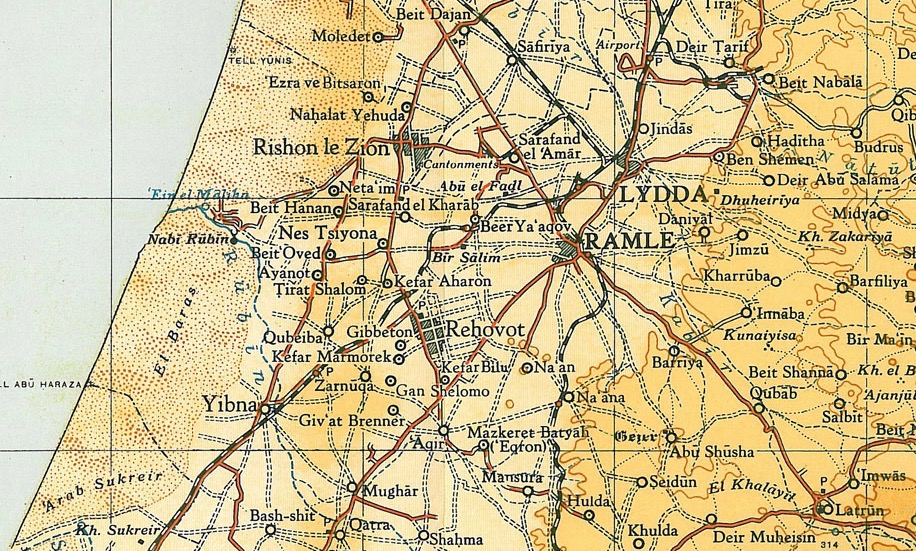
Rishon LeZion 1945 1:250,000

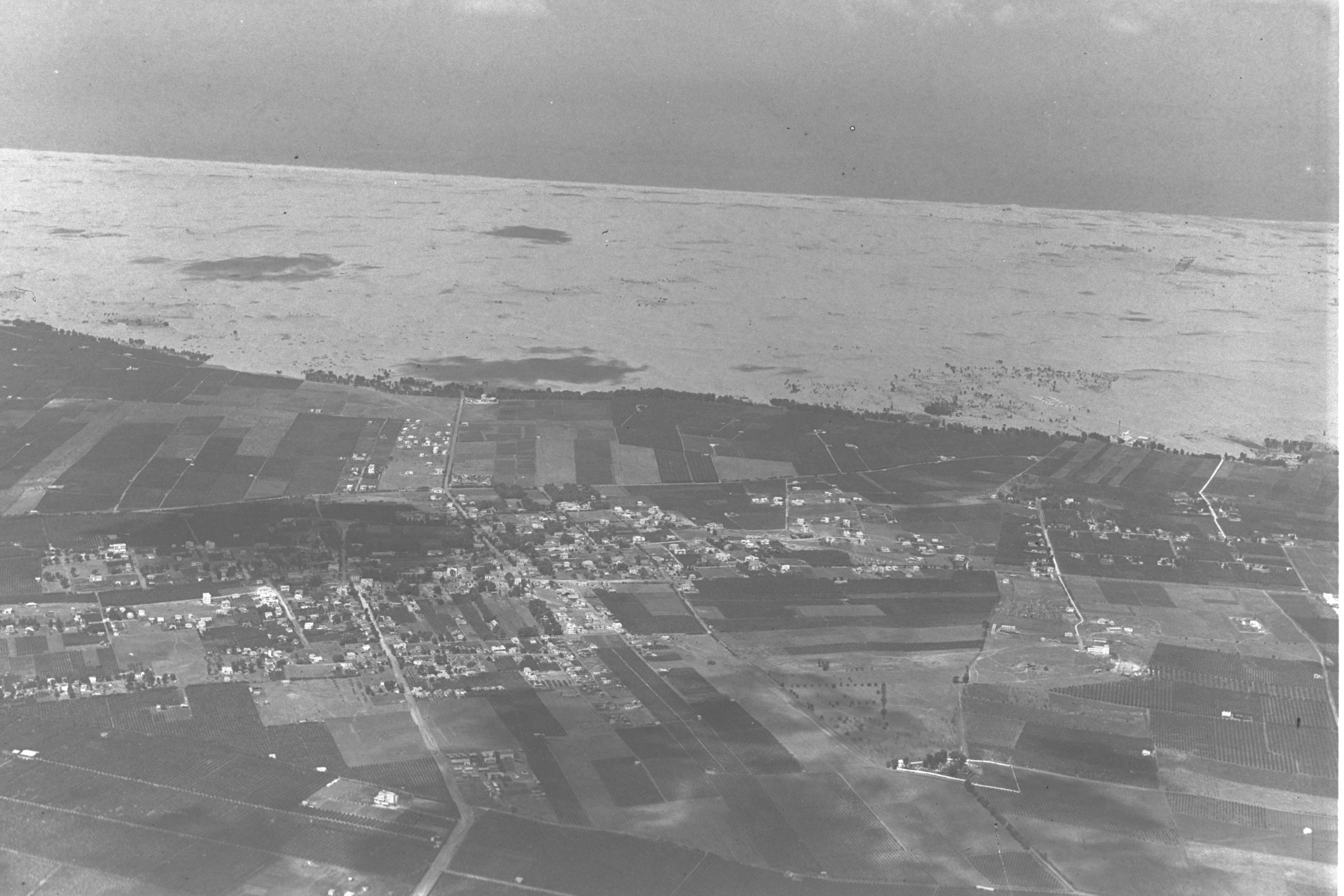
Rishon LeZion 1937

=== State of Israel ===
Rishon LeZion was declared a city in 1950, by which time it had a population of around 18,000. By 1983 it had a population of 103,000. In 2006, 222,300 people were living in the city. By 2020, the population is expected to reach 253,600. In 2007, the Rishon LeZion Municipality was awarded the Ministry of Interior Prize for Proper Management.

In 2016, the Israeli government approved the expansion of Rishon LeZion onto sand dunes west of the city, upon which one of the largest commercial and residential construction projects in the Central District will be built on 1,000 dunams. Another industrial zone in the western part of the city is planned to be almost doubled in size.

On 14 June 2025, an Iranian missile strike directly hit a residential building, killing three civilians and injuring over 20 others, including a 3-month-old baby who was rescued from the rubble. In March 2026, a daycare which was empty at the time of impact, as well other sites, were damaged by cluster munitions during the 2026 Iran war, with sites being visited afterwards by Israeli President Isaac Herzog.

== Demographics ==
Historical population
Year	Pop.	±%
1972	53,300	—
1983	102,500	+92.3%
1995	163,400	+59.4%
2008	226,800	+38.8%
2022	252,413	+11.3%
2024	259,275	+2.7%

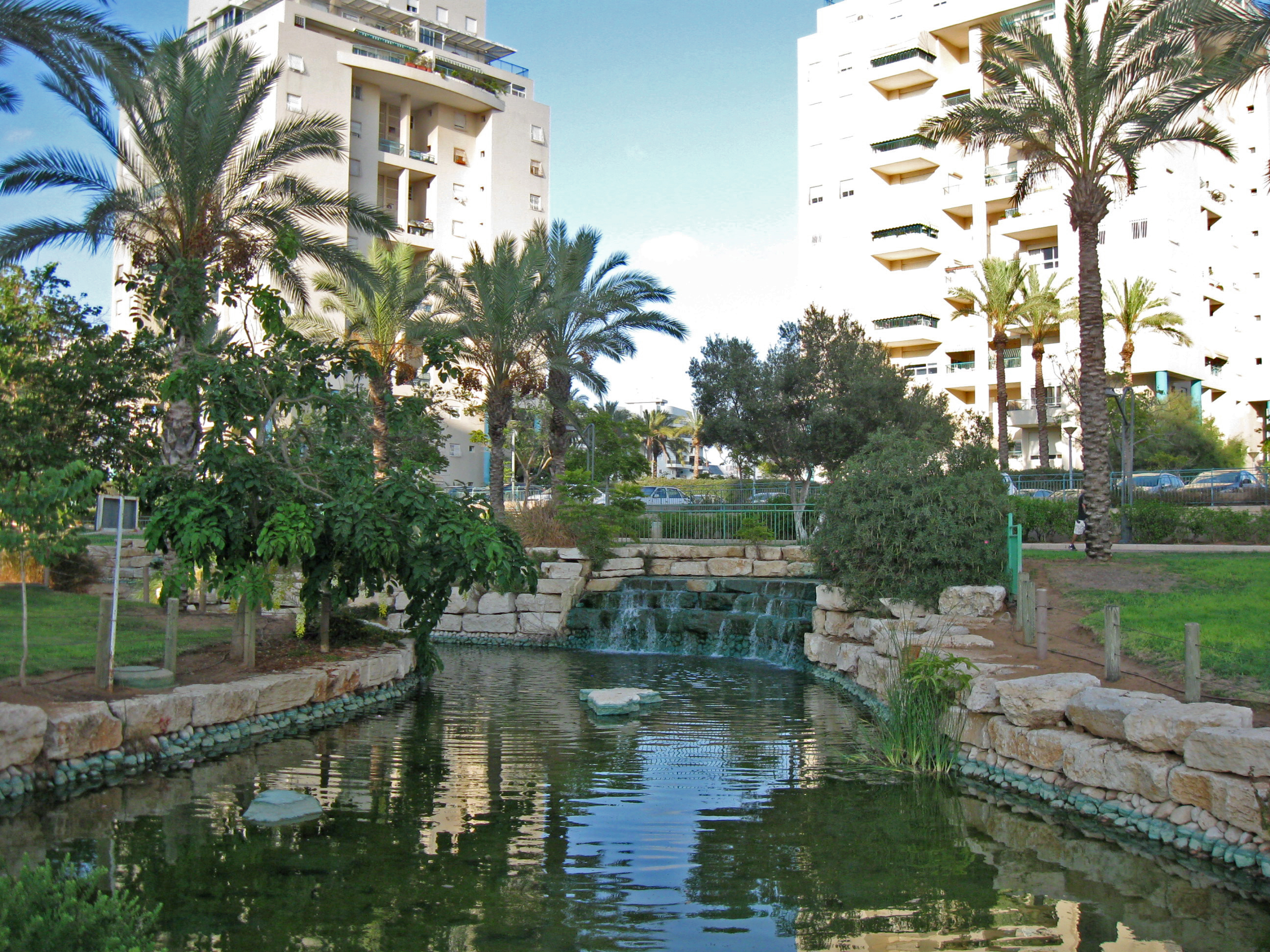
Neot Ashalim Park

The 1922 Census conducted by the British Mandate authorities found 1,373 Jews living in Rishon LeZion and 23 Muslims.

According to data from the Israel Central Bureau of Statistics as of December 2024, the number of residents in Rishon LeZion is 259,275. Rishon LeZion is one of the fastest-growing cities in Israel, and is the third-youngest city in the country, after Jerusalem and Bnei Brak, with 31.1% of the population being children and teenagers, and 61.4% of all residents being aged 40 or under. In addition, the city has attracted significant immigration, including from English-speaking countries. The city is expected to have a population of around 270,000 by 2030. Its population growth rate is about 5% per year. The majority of the city's residents are Jews.

== Economy ==
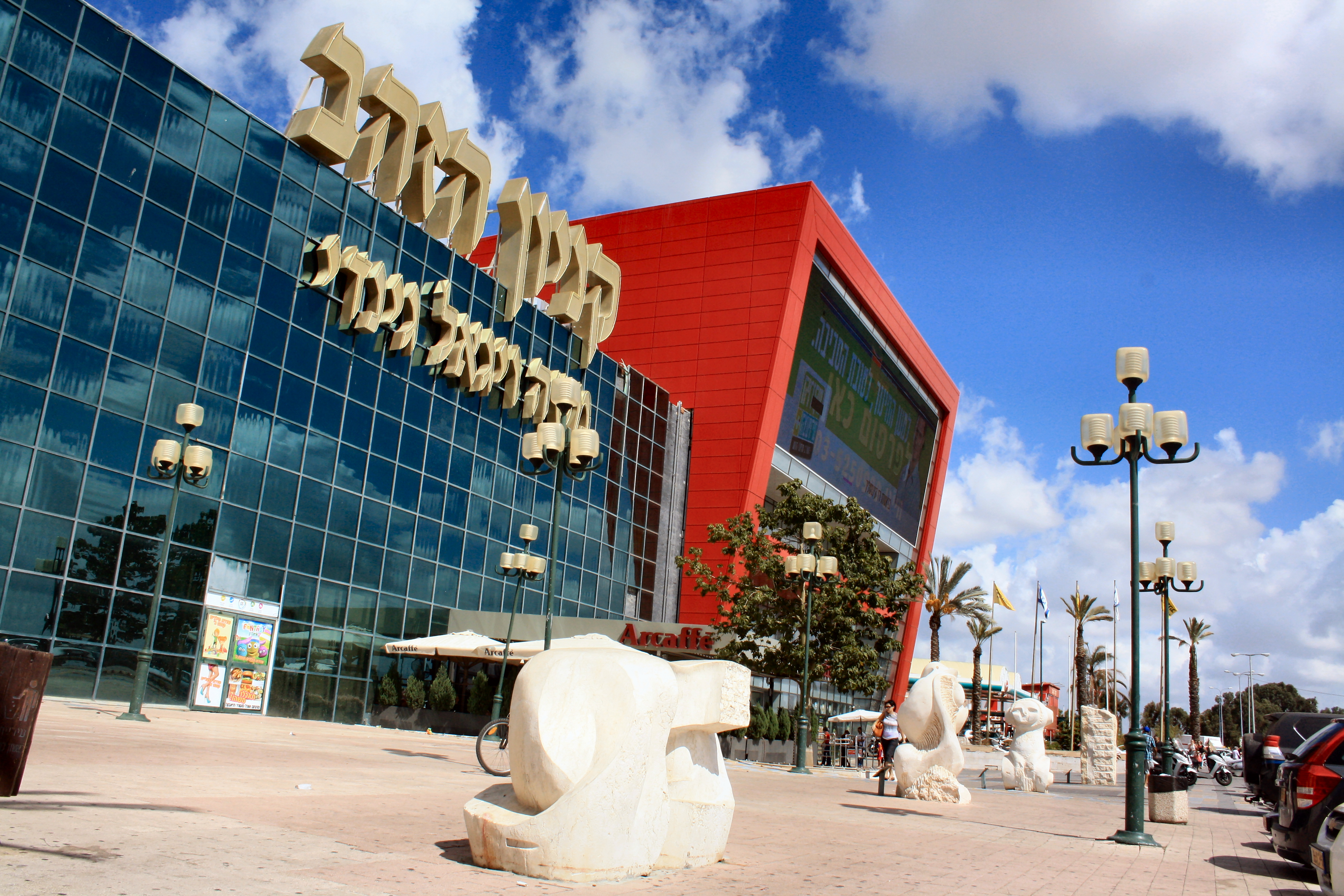
HaZahav shopping mall

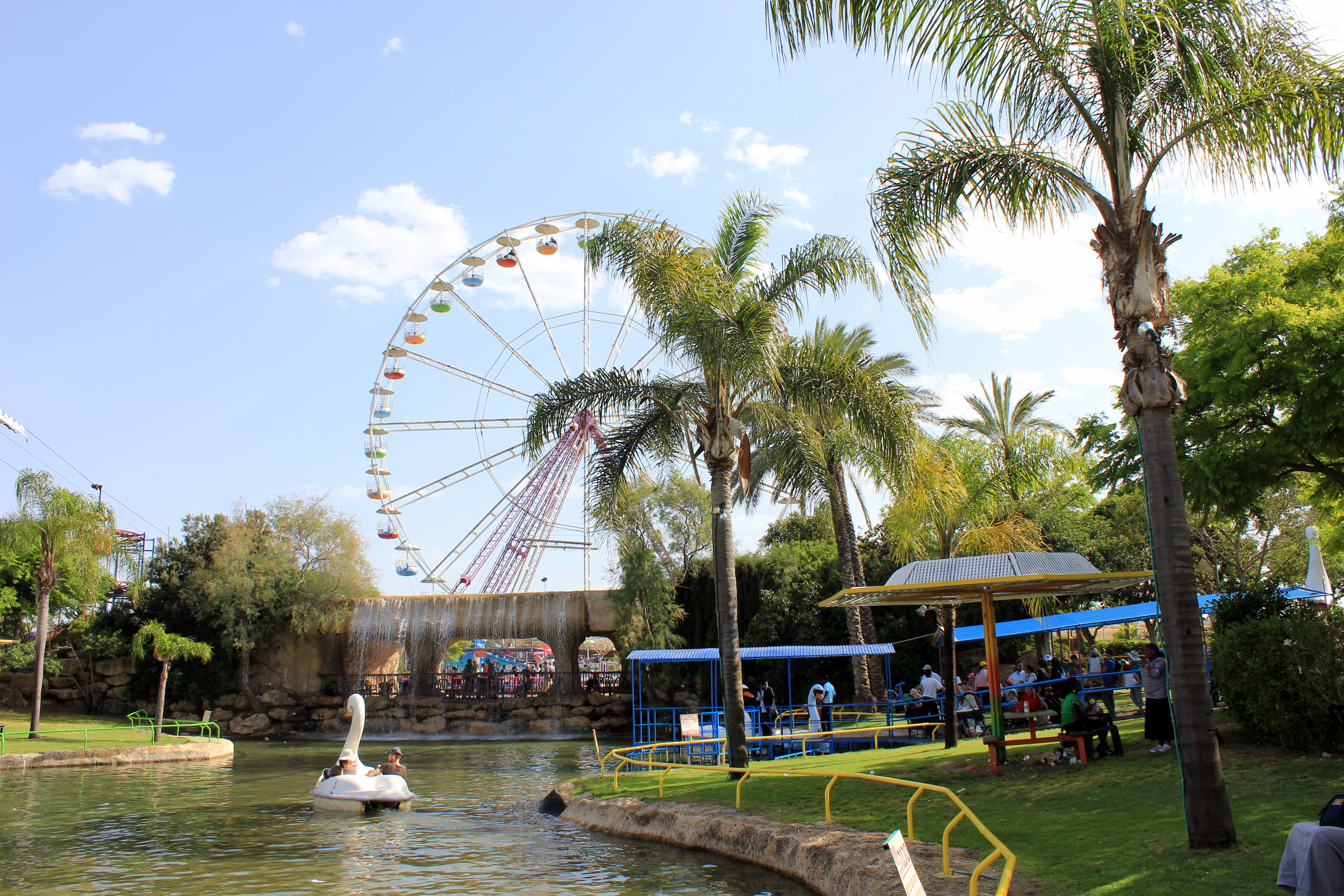
Superland amusement park

Rishon LeZion's main industries today are wine, construction, services and commerce. Factories and workshops are located in the old industrial zone, which has become a popular venue for pubs, dance clubs, and restaurants. Industry in the city is largely divided into two industrial centers: the old industrial zone in the north of the city and the new industrial zone in the west of the city.

The three major malls in Rishon LeZion are Rothschild Center in the old downtown center, Gold Mall (Kenyon HaZahav) in the New West district, and the newly constructed Azrieli Rishonim. Companies such as Coca-Cola, Gazit-Globe, Volvo, and Fiat are expected to open in the Maayan Sorek area. As part of the city's 5-year plan to be completely water-independent, construction of a desalination plant is planned for Rishon, which will produce 3.7 million cubic meters of water per year. The city already hosts the large Shafdan recycling plant. On 25 January 2026, it was announced that the Soreq B desalination plant had gone into full operation, producing 200 million cubic metres of water annually after having began at 60% capacity in the previous year.

== Local government ==
=== Mayors ===
- Elyakum Ostashinski (1950–51)
- Aryeh Sheftel (1951)
- Moshe Gavin (1952–55)
- Gershon Man Mankov (1955)
- Hana Levin (1955–60)
- Aryeh Sheftel (1960–62)
- Noam Laoner (1962–65)
- Aryeh Sheftel (1965–69)
- Hananya Gibstein (1969–83)
- Meir Nitzan (1983–2008)
- Dov Tzur (2008–2018)
- Raz Kinstlich (2018–Present)

== Education and culture ==
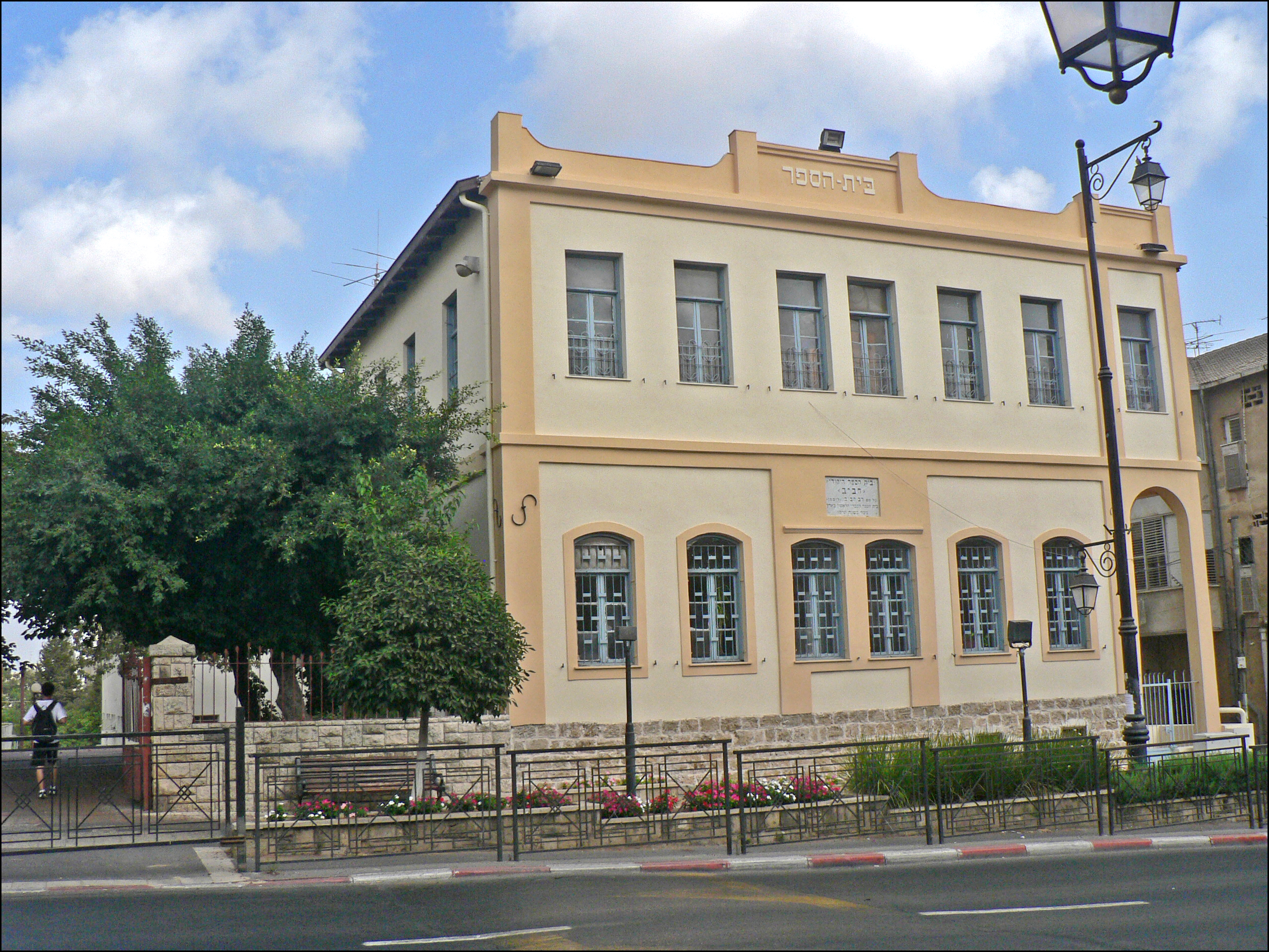
Haviv School, the first all-Hebrew elementary school

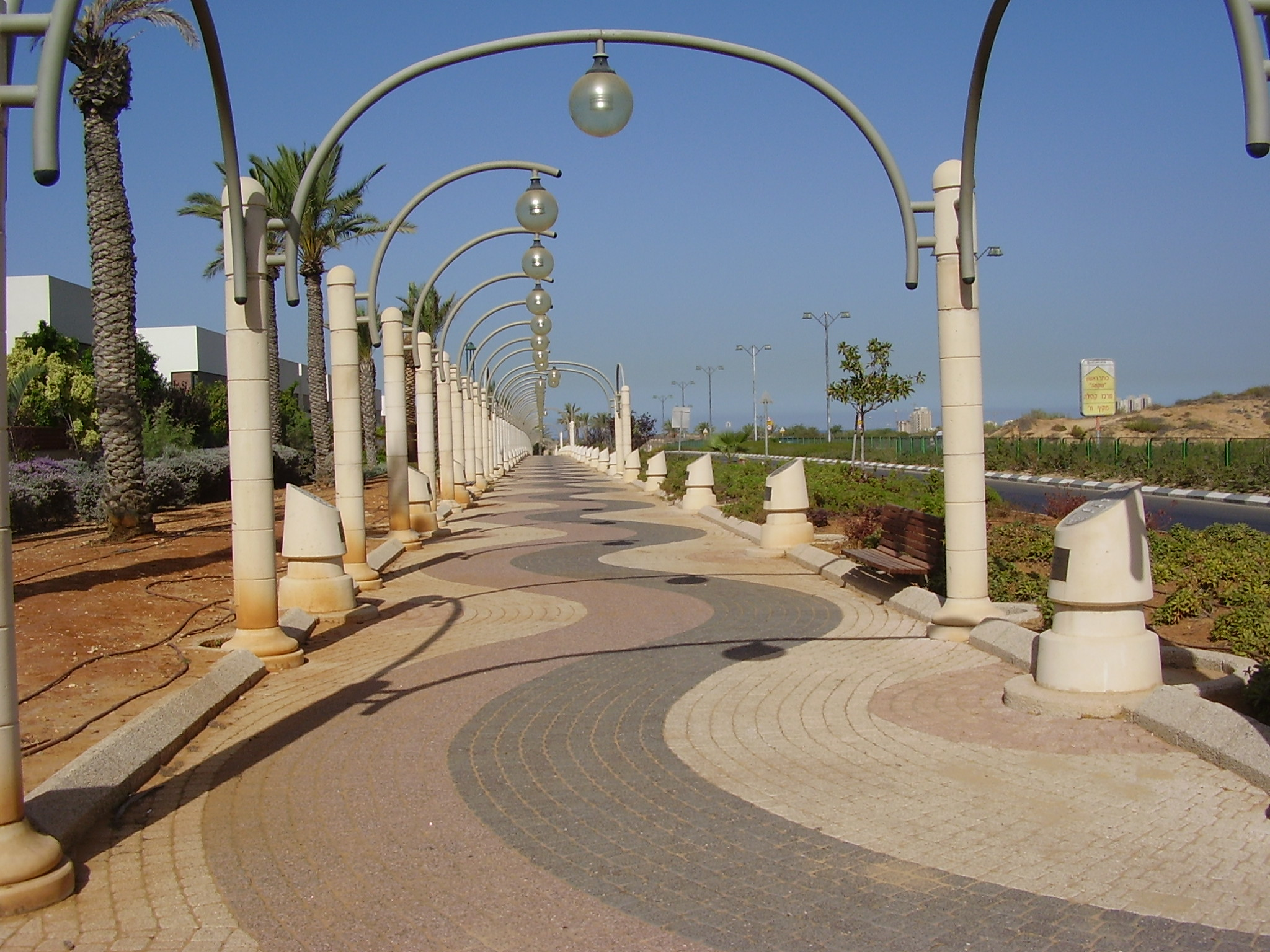
Boardwalk (Tayelet Hatnei Pras Nobel) with cenotaphs of Jewish Nobel Prize laureates in Rishon LeZion

Rishon LeZion has twenty-three elementary schools, nine middle schools, and twelve high schools. Rishon Lezion's College of Management has a student population of 10,000. Sixty percent of twelve graders in the city qualify for a matriculation certificate.

Rishon LeZion holds an annual wine festival. The Rishon LeZion Amphitheatre Live Park has hosted overseas artists such as Sting, Mariah Carey, Ozzy Osbourne, Christina Aguilera, Metallica, Alanis Morissette, alt-J, Megadeth, Deep Purple, Avicii, Jason Derulo, Flo Rida, Wiz Khalifa and Sean Paul. The city has a municipal zoo, an amusement park (Superland), and a beach promenade. Heychal HaTarbut (Hall of Culture) is a venue for classical concerts, theatre performances and cultural events. It has a larger theatre for shows and two smaller ones for art workshops. The Israel Symphony Orchestra Rishon LeZion has participated in music festivals all over the world. It was awarded the ACUM Prize in 1991.

== Landmarks ==
Landmarks in Rishon LeZion include the history museum; the Carmel Winery; the administrative center of Edmond James de Rothschild, now a soldiers' memorial; the Great Synagogue; the Well; the old water tower; and Beit Sefer Haviv, the first Hebrew School. "Open Doors" is a holocaust memorial which is a 7-meter-high (23-foot) sculpture designed by Filipino artist Luis Lee Jr. It was erected in honor and thanks to President Manuel Quezon and the Filipinos who saved over 1,200 Jews from Nazi Germany.

Former mayor Meir Nitzan initiated the construction of a promenade honoring Jewish Nobel Prize laureates in the neighborhood named Kiryat Hatanei Pras Nobel (קריית חתני פרס נובל). The promenade that was named Nobel Laureates Boulevard (in Hebrew טיילת חתני פרס נובל) starts at the beginning of Eli Wiesel St. and continues through Henry Kissinger and Rene Cassin Streets in Kiryat Hatanei Pras Nobel. The boulevard has a pedestal erected for each laureate. The circular medal on top of the pedestal includes the year of the award in the center of the medal; the name of the laureate, the country, and the prize field are shown in both Hebrew and English. The citation of the Prize is listed on an additional plaque on the side of the pedestal. The scientific advisor of the project was Rishon Lezion resident, Prof. Israel Hanukoglu.

== Geography ==
Rishon LeZion is located on the Israeli Mediterranean Coastal Plain and the northern Shephelah. The city sees the majority of its annual 800 mm (31 in) of precipitation between October and March.

Climate data for Rishon LeZion
Month	Jan	Feb	Mar	Apr	May	Jun	Jul	Aug	Sep	Oct	Nov	Dec	Year
Mean daily maximum °C (°F)	17.8 (64.0)	18.4 (65.1)	21.3 (70.3)	25.9 (78.6)	27.9 (82.2)	29.2 (84.6)	30.6 (87.1)	30.5 (86.9)	28.8 (83.8)	25.2 (77.3)	20.1 (68.2)	18.5 (65.3)	24.5 (76.1)
Mean daily minimum °C (°F)	7.7 (45.9)	7.9 (46.2)	9.5 (49.1)	12.5 (54.5)	15.7 (60.3)	18.1 (64.6)	20.6 (69.1)	19.8 (67.6)	17.3 (63.1)	12.2 (54.0)	9.4 (48.9)	8.2 (46.8)	13.2 (55.8)
Average precipitation mm (inches)	244.7 (9.63)	108.9 (4.29)	61.4 (2.42)	25.3 (1.00)	3.5 (0.14)	0 (0)	0 (0)	0 (0)	2.1 (0.08)	47.9 (1.89)	73.7 (2.90)	236.8 (9.32)	804.3 (31.67)
Source: YR.NO

== Neighborhoods ==
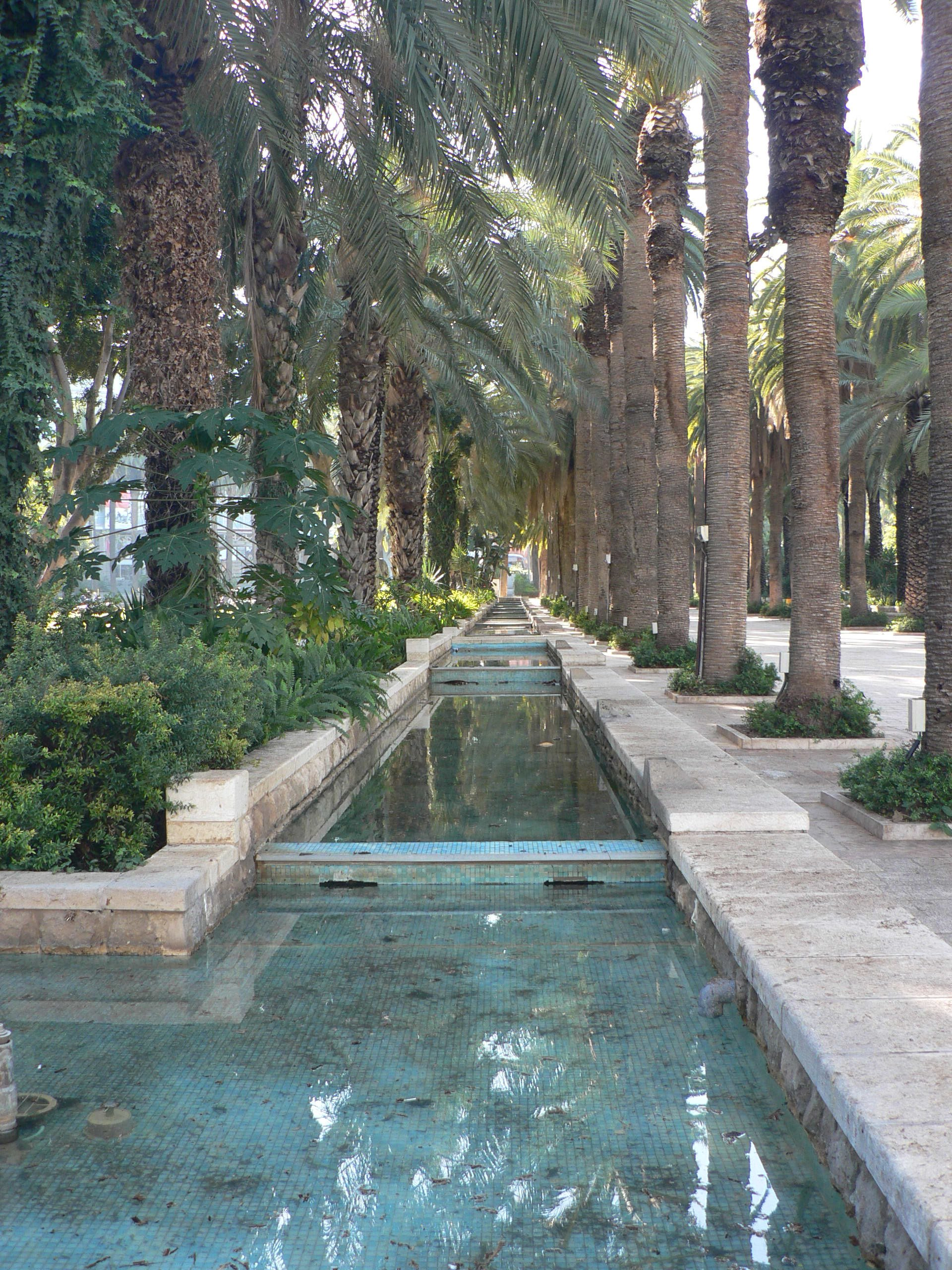
Gan Rishon

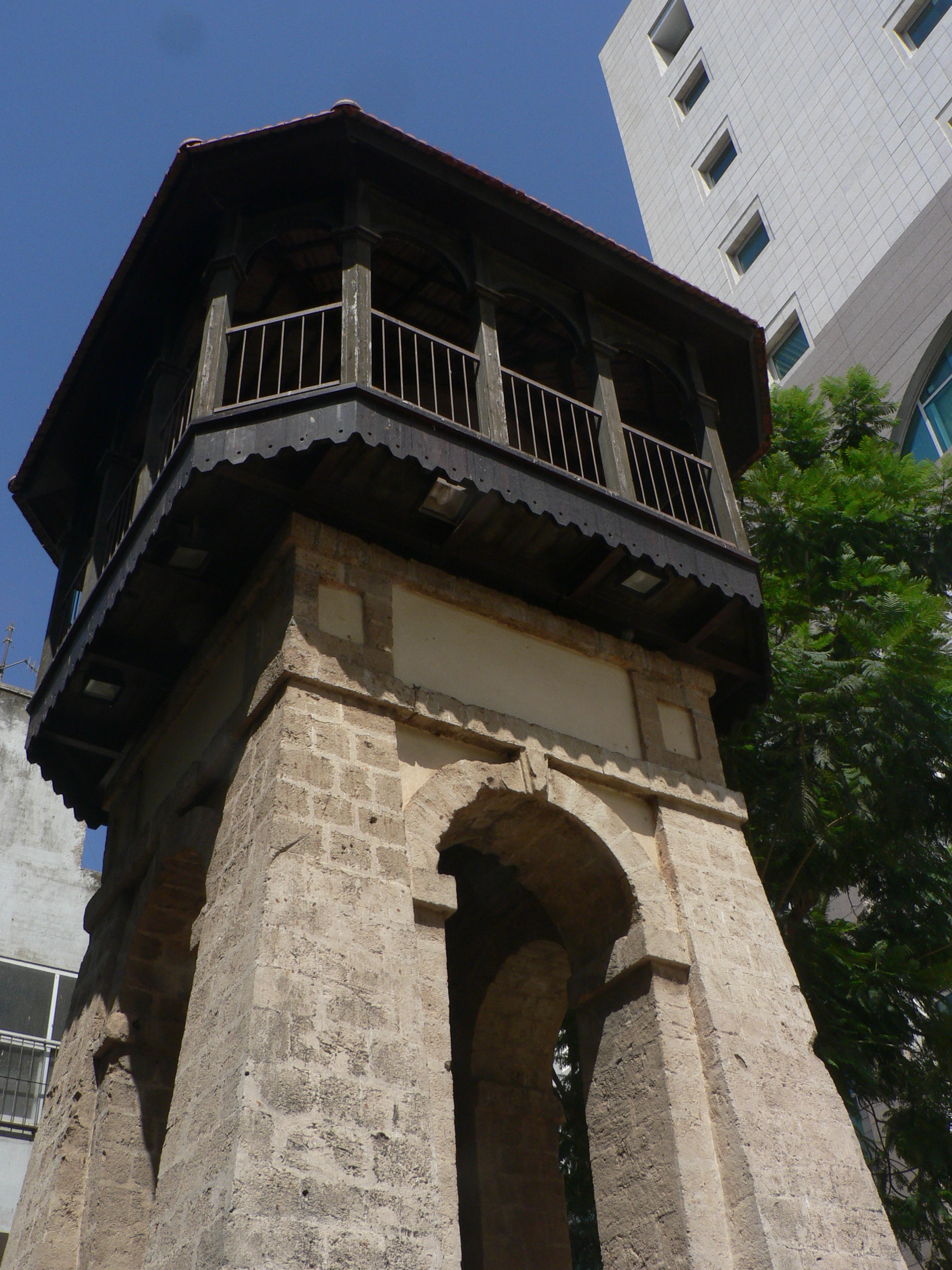
Old water tower

Rishon LeZion can be divided into four main quarters: the old city, the eastern housing projects, the northern (old) industrial zone, and Western Rishon LeZion. There is also an industrial zone on the southern tip of the city, next to Gan Sorek.

=== Old city ===
The old city of Rishon includes the original neighborhoods, some buildings dating back to Rishon's founding in 1881. This quarter is located in the city center, between and around Herzl and Jabotinsky Streets. It includes the following neighborhoods: Nahalat Yehuda (on the northernmost tip of Rishon); Neve Hillel; Bnot Hayil; Abramovich; Katzenelson; Remez (Giv'at Levinson), on the southwestern tip of old Rishon; Rishonim (Gan Nahum), to the east of Remez

=== Shikunei HaMizrah ===
The Eastern Housing Projects (Hebrew: שיכוני המזרח Shikunei HaMizrah) was Rishon's quick expansion to the east. It is dominated by the housing projects (shikunim) there, in the Shikunei HaMizrah neighborhood itself. The eastern projects stopped developing when they reached the fences of the Tzrifin military base. When and if Tzrifin is sold to private contractors as planned, this quarter is expected to expand significantly with new lucrative housing projects. Other smaller neighborhoods include Revivim, Kidmat Rishon, Ne'urim, Rambam, Neve Hadarim, HaShomer, Kfar Arye, Mishor HaNof and Kiryat Simha.

=== Old industrial zone ===
The industrial zones in Rishon LeZion are called Mabat, an abbreviation for Miskhar, Bilui VeTa'asiya (Commerce, Pastime and Industry). The northern zone is the oldest and original industrial zone, once full of light industry and glass factories. Today, it is known for its prolific nightlife.

=== West Rishon ===
West Rishon LeZion is the conglomeration of the new neighborhoods of the city, built in the 1980s and 90s. The west also has a higher land value because of its relative proximity to the Mediterranean Sea. It includes the entire city west of Tzahal Road. The quarter includes the new industrial zone (Western Mabat), and several residential neighborhoods: Neve Eliyahu (or Ramat Eliyahu), Neot Shikma, Neve Dekalim, Neve Hof (or Pueblo Español), Neve Yam, Kiryat Rishon, Kiryat Cramim, Kiryat Ganim, Neot Ashalim, Kiryat Hatanei Pras Nobel (lit Nobel Prize Laureates' Town)

== Sports ==
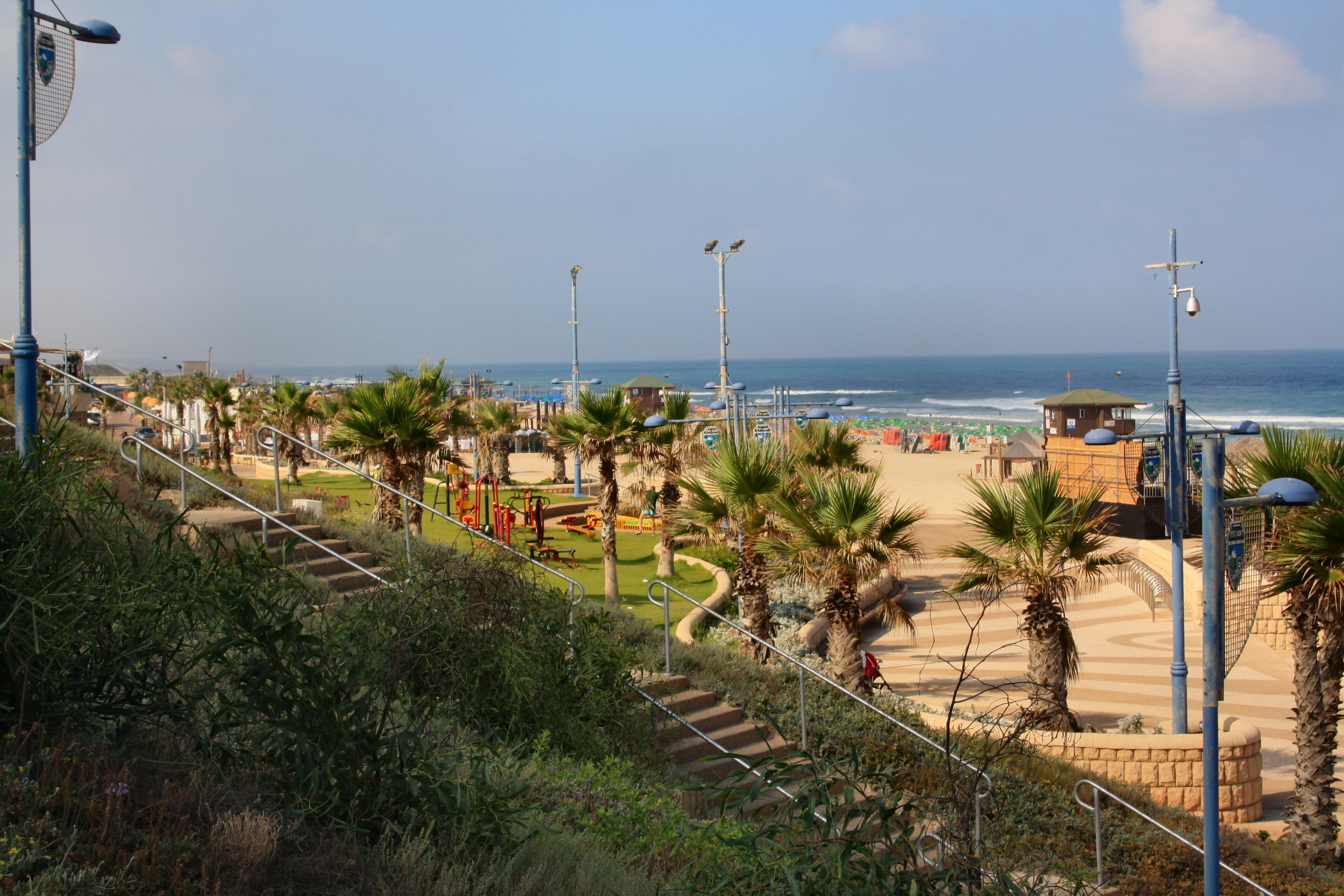
Rishon LeZion beach

Rishon LeZion is known for its achievements in handball and chess. In handball, Hapoel Rishon LeZion and Maccabi Rishon LeZion dominate the handball league. Hapoel has won more than seven domestic championships and cups in a row, with stars like goalkeeper Vladimir Zaikman and field-players Idan Maimon and Dudi Balsar. Its biggest rival, Maccabi took the championship title from Hapoel in 2005/06. Handball is also a dominant sport in Rishon LeZion high schools. The Amit Amal high school handball team has won the world championship several times.

In chess, the Rishon LeZion Chess Club, founded in 1939, is one of the leading clubs in Israel, in senior, women and youth leagues. Israeli grandmasters such as Boris Alterman play for Rishon. World champion Garry Kasparov was a former member.

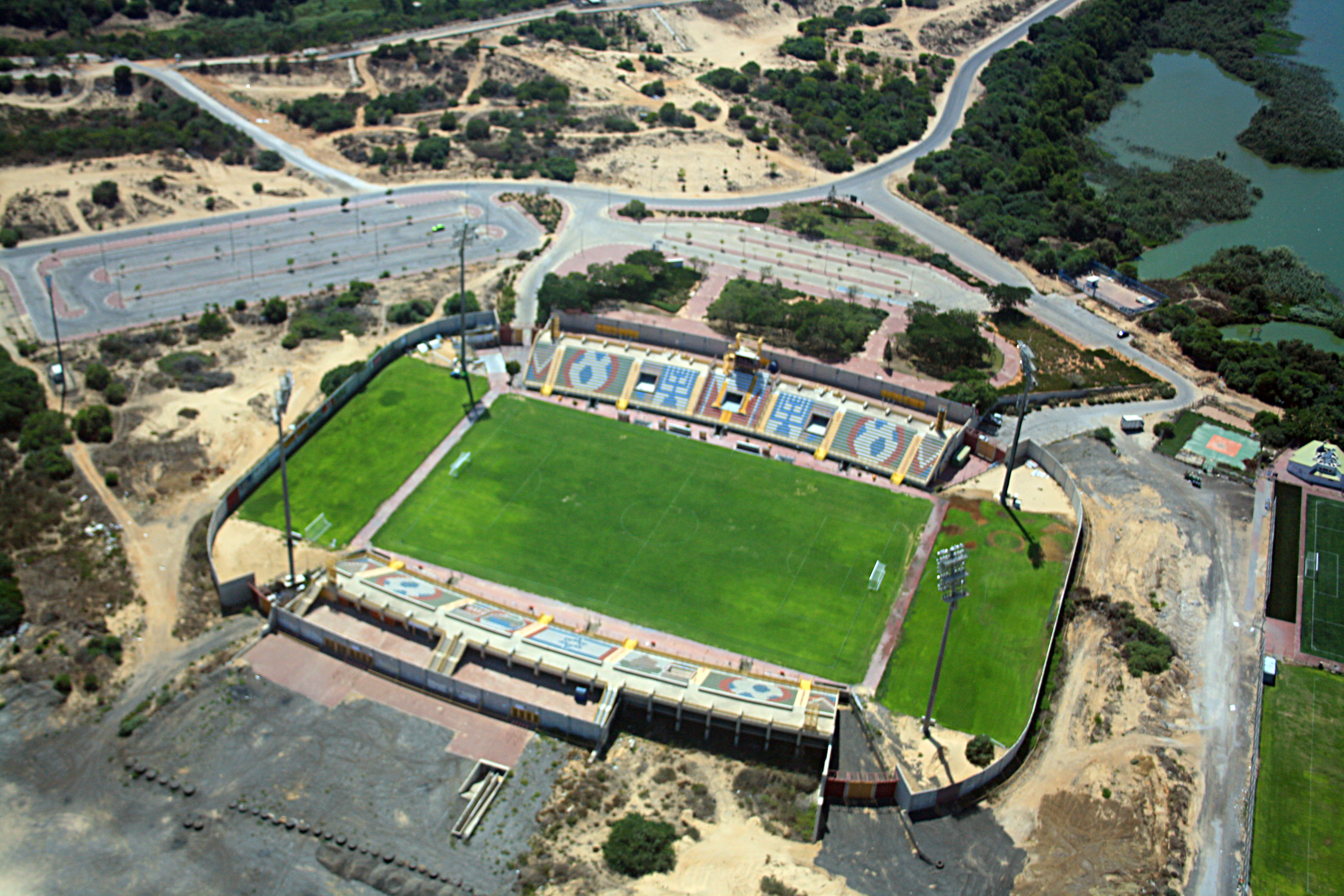
Haberfeld Stadium

Hapoel Rishon LeZion is the major football club, currently playing in the second tier, although the club played in the past in the top division, even as recently as 2011–12. The club also appeared in two cup finals, in 1946 and in 1996 and won the 2012–13 Toto Cup Leumit. Other active football teams are Moadon Sport Shikun HaMizrah (playing in Liga Alef), Hapoel Nahalat Yehuda (playing in Liga Bet), and Moadon Sport Rishon LeZion (playing in Liga Gimel). Other football clubs previously played in the city, such as Maccabi Rishon Lezion, which played at the top division during the 1940s and the two seasons after the Israeli Declaration of Independence, as well as smaller clubs which played in the lower tiers, such as Beitar Rishon LeZion, Hapoel Bnei Zion and Hapoel HaMegabesh Rishon LeZion.

The main football stadium in Rishon LeZion is the 6,000-seat Haberfeld Stadium, which hosts matches of Hapoel Rishon LeZion. Other, smaller stadiums, are located in Shikun Hamizrah, in Nahlat Yehuda, and in the Superland amusement park complex.

The Maccabi Rishon LeZion basketball team is a long-time member of Ligat HaAl, the top division. The team plays at Bet Maccabi Arena, which seats 2,500. Maccabi The team was a rival to Israel's top club and European champion, Maccabi Tel Aviv in the 1990s. It was a surprise Ligat HaAl champion in the 2015–16 season.

The Maccabi Rishon LeZion handball team is a long-time member of Ligat Ha'Al, the top division. Maccabi Rishon LeZion is the Israeli club to win the greatest handball national championships.

The city also is home to the new 3,000-seat Athletics Municipal Stadium, which was built between 2001 and 2013, with the intention to host international athletics competitions.

== Transportation ==
Rishon LeZion can be accessed by road from Highway 20 (Ayalon Highway), Highway 4, Highway 44, and Highway 431. Public transportation includes bus, train and share taxi.

=== Rail transport ===
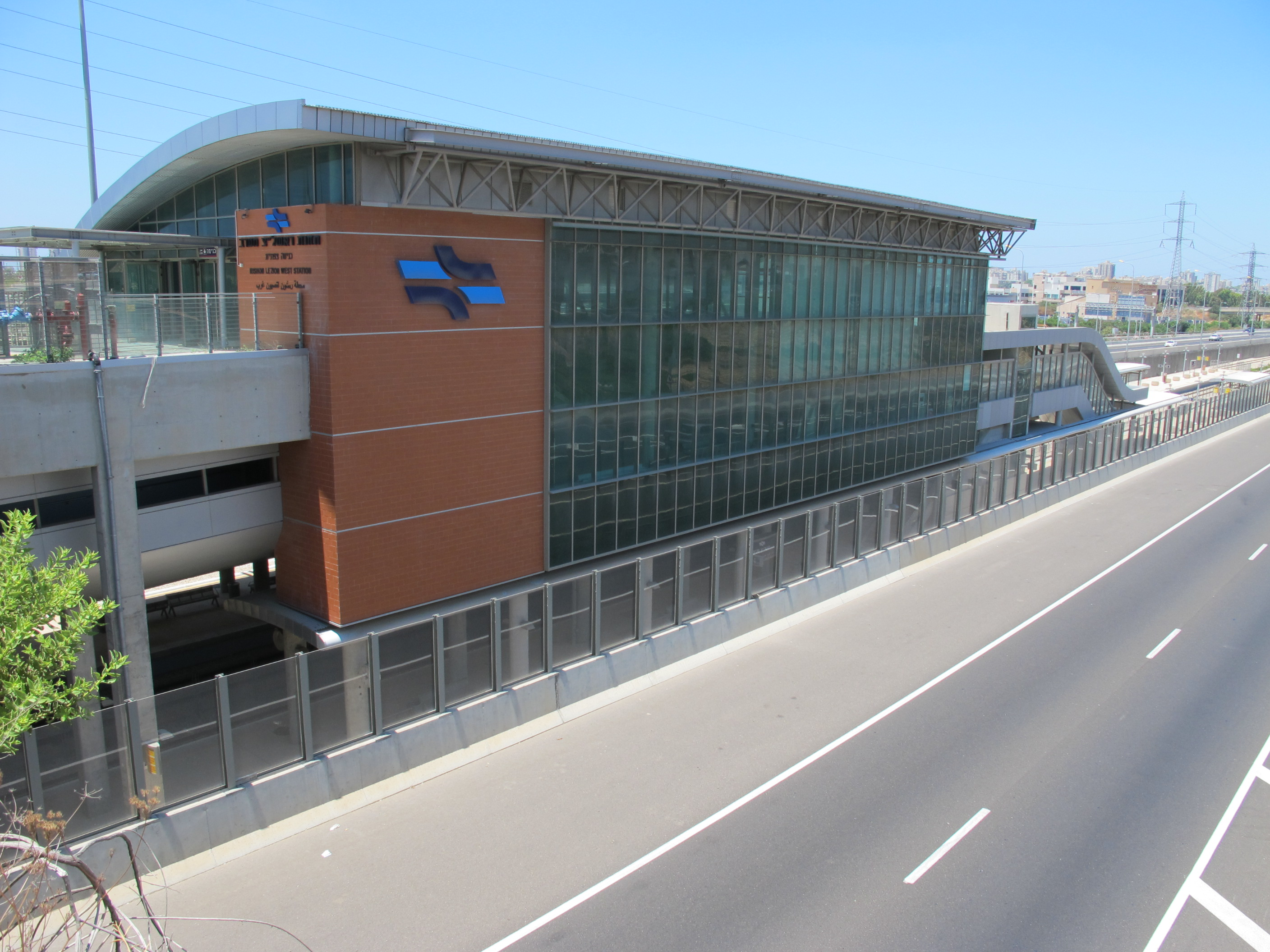
Rishon LeZion Moshe Dayan railway station

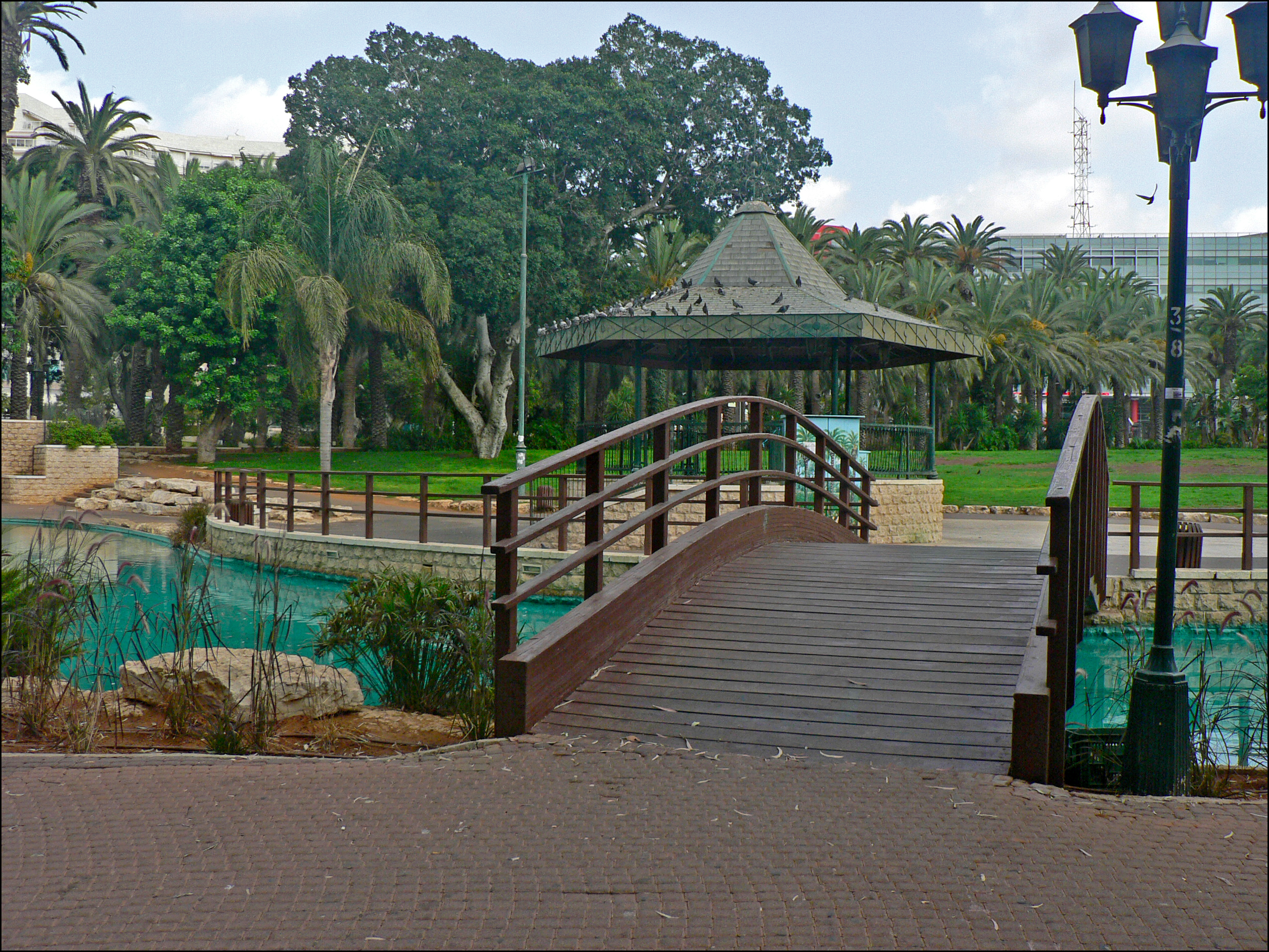
Gan Habaron

The Rishon LeZion Moshe Dayan Railway Station is in the western part of the city, situated on the rail line from Herzliya to Be'er Sheva, and offers direct service to Tel Aviv.

The Rishon LeZion HaRishonim Railway Station is located to the south of the city center, in the middle of HaRishonim Interchange, at the intersection of Highway 431 and the Rishon LeZion – Ness Ziona road. There are direct trains from the HaRishonim Railway Station only to Lod. The rest of the Israel Railways network can be accessed using the transfer stations at Lod.

A rail line is currently under construction that will connect Moshe Dayan and HaRishonim stations to Jerusalem and Modi'in. Operation is expected to begin in 2028.

The Green Line of the Tel Aviv Light Rail is expected to begin service to Rishon LeZion starting in 2028. The Red Line of the Tel Aviv Light Rail is currently being extended to Rishon LeZion. The M1 Line of the Tel Aviv Metro is planned to run through Rishon LeZion.

=== Bus transport ===
The bus companies serving intercity lines in Rishon LeZion are: Egged, Dan, Afikim, Metropoline, and Kavim. Rishon LeZion has an intracity bus network operated by Egged and Dan. Most lines are metropolitan, continuing to Bat Yam, Holon, Tel Aviv and Jaffa. The bus lines are augmented by share taxis operated by Moniyot HaIr.

== Voting Patterns ==
In the 2022 election, 50 percent of voters in Rishon LeZion voted for the parties of the center-left coalition led by Yair Lapid, while 48 percent voted for the parties of the right-wing coalition led by Benjamin Netanyahu and 0.1 percent voted for the Arab parties.

In the 2026 election, 52 percent of voters in Rishon LeZion voted for the parties of the center-left coalition led by Gadi Eisenkot, while 42 percent voted for the parties of the right-wing coalition led by Benjamin Netanyahu and 0.1 percent voted for the Arab parties. An additional 4.6 percent voted for the Reservists, and 1.7 percent voted for Amcha Yisrael. Voter turnout increased 14 percent from the 2022 election.

== Notable people ==
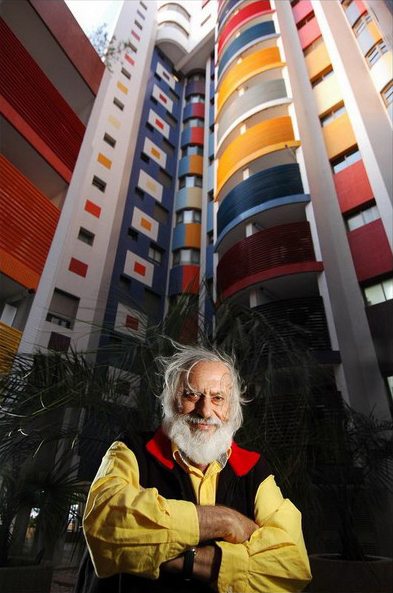
Yaacov Agam

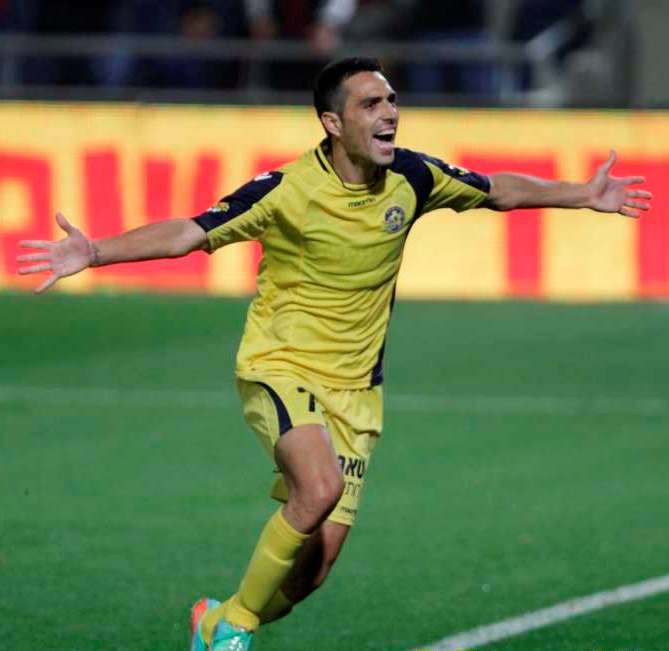
Eran Zehavi

- Yaacov Agam (1928-2026), sculptor and artist
- Zohar Argov (1955–1987), singer
- Linoy Ashram (born 1999), retired individual rhythmic gymnast, first Israeli Olympic champion in rhythmic gymnastics
- Daria Atamanov (born 2005), world champion rhythmic gymnast
- Eliza Banchuk (born 2007), world champion rhythmic gymnast
- Yigal Bashan (1950–2018), singer, songwriter, and actor
- Tal Ben Haim (born 1982), international footballer
- Ram Bergman, film producer
- Shmuel Cohen (1870–1940), musical composer of the Israeli National Anthem, the Hatikvah
- Shoshana Damari (1923–2006), singer
- Tal Dunne (born 1987), Welsh-born Israeli professional basketball player for Ironi Nes Ziona
- Artem Dolgopyat (born 1997), Olympic champion and world champion gymnast
- Noam Dovrat (born 2002), basketball player
- Mei Finegold (born 1982), singer
- Shay Gabso (born 1984), singer
- Gideon Gechtman (1942–2008), sculptor
- Boris Gelfand (born 1968), chess grandmaster
- Rami Gershon (born 1988), international footballer
- Eliyahu Giladi (1915–1943), executed Lehi fighter
- Ya'akov Hodorov (1927–2006), goalkeeper
- Nitzan Horowitz (born 1965), politician
- Ziv Kalontarov (born 1997), European champion swimmer
- Tomer Kapon (born 1985), film and television actor
- Anastassia Michaeli (born 1975), television journalist, presenter, politician
- Yagutil Mishiev (1927–2024), author
- Shlomo Molla (born 1965), politician
- Muki (born 1975), singer
- Peter Paltchik (born 1992), Olympic and European champion judoka
- Ophir Pines-Paz (born 1961), politician
- Ami Popper (born 1969), mass murderer and terrorist
- Sefi Rivlin (1947–2013), actor and comedian
- Hilla Vidor (born 1975), actress
- Sagiv Yehezkel (born 1995), international footballer
- Tomer Z, drummer, Blackfield
- Adele Zaikman (born 2001), professional ballroom dancer
- Eran Zahavi (born 1987), international footballer
- Bat-Sheva Zeisler, singer and voice teacher

== International relations ==
Rishon LeZion is twinned with:

- Admiralteysky (Saint Petersburg), Russia
- Brașov, Romania
- Debrecen, Hungary
- Gondar, Ethiopia
- Kaunas, Lithuania
- Kharkiv, Ukraine
- Lublin, Poland
- Münster, Germany
- Nîmes, France (1986)
- Prešov, Slovakia (2008)
- Prince George's County, Maryland, United States
- Teramo, Italy (1988)
- Tianjin, China

During the Gulf War in 1991, the mayor of Münster, Germany, made a surprise visit to Rishon LeZion. According to Haaretz, he felt he could not sit quietly at home while missiles were falling on his sister city. Throughout the war, he stayed at the home of Rishon LeZion mayor Meir Nitzan and accompanied him on visits to sites hit by missiles.

In 2009 a memorial was erected in Rishon LeZion to the 10,000 German and Austrian Jews who found refuge in the Philippines during the Shoah.
