= Boris Mavashev =

Israeli seismologist

Boris Mavashev (Hebrew: בוריס מבשב; born 9 May 1939 in Tashkent) is an Israeli seismologist, doctor of geology and ecology, specializing in the geochemical and meteorological precursors of earthquakes.

== Early life ==
Boris Mavashev was born on 9 May 1939 in Tashkent. In 1957, he entered the Tashkent state university, majoring in physics and technology. In 1962, he graduated and started working as a teacher of physics and electrical engineering at the university level.

== Early studies ==
In 1965, Mavashev started full-time work at the Scientific Research Institute of Health Resorts in Tashkent to study the health resorts potential of Uzbekistan. At the physics laboratory there, he began studying the radioactivity of radium and radon, the electric conductivity, and the micro-constituent composition of therapeutic underground waters of Uzbekistan. He published scientific articles about radon waters and the variations in concentration in the mineral water of Tashkent in connection with the devastating Tashkent earthquake on 26 April 1966. He discovered the radon precursors of earthquakes; this method for the predicting of earthquakes was adopted by scientists in many countries.

In 1971, Mavashev successfully completed and defended his Ph.D. thesis. In 1977 he was awarded a State Prize and the Discovery Diploma 129. From 1975 to 1990, he worked as a senior scientific worker and head of the laboratory for studying the air basin ecology at the Central Asiatic Hydro-Meteorological institute and the Automobile Institute.

== Study of earthquakes ==
On 4 April 1990, Mavashev and his family moved to Jerusalem. He joined the Machon Lev Technological Institute and at the Holon Institute of Technology.

He cooperated with the Institute of Geophysics and the Institute of Geology.

During the next 20 years, he prepared and submitted more than 15 scientific projects and published over 25 scientific studies in Israel, the US, Japan, and other countries. These were largely concerned with the topical contemporary problems of the prediction of earthquakes, and global climatic change and its connection with the activated seismicity on the Earth.

He worked on the patent application on the subject “Method for the prediction of earthquakes”.

He is an active member of the New York Academy of Sciences.

== Global climate change ==
In 2004, Mavashev created the non-profit organization Center of science and education of Repatriates. Mavashev wrote a report on global climate warming and earthquakes.

== Publications ==
Mavashev has published over 70 scientific papers on radioactivity of ground water, and the interconnections of global climate warming with earthquakes.

- 1967. "The portent of a strong tectonic earthquake", with co-authors, USSR Acad. of Sc. v 176
- 1969. "The effect of the after-shocks of the Tashkent earthquake on the changes of the thermal water of the Tashkent artesian basin", Medicine
- 1970. "The portent of the Tashkent earthquake", with co-authors, FAN publishers
- 1991. "Geochemical and meteorological aspects of earthquake prediction", Israel Geological Society, Akko
- 1992. "Meteorological precursors of earthquake. Earthquake, Weather and Ecology", 2nd International Conference on Asian Marine Geology, Tokyo
- 1993. "Automated control system of eco-geodynamical processes for earthquake prediction", 25th International Symposium on Remote sensing and Global Environmental Change, Michigan, USA
- 1996. "About interrelation between meteorological and seismic-tectonics processes and earthquake prediction", The Israel Mineral Science and Engineering Association, Syhron Yaqov, Israel
- 1999. "Method of Earthquakes Prediction and Automated Geo-monitoring System", Interdisciplinary Annual Seminar, Geological Features of Underground Water Resources of Israel and Middle East Countries, Jerusalem
- 2000. "Earthquake prediction. Buildings and Seismic Problems of Israel", Technion, Haifa, Israel
- 2002. "Meteorological Indicators of the Earthquakes", XXIII General Assembly of the International Union of Geodesy and Geophysics, Sapporo, Japan
- 2004. "The Weather Anomalies and Earthquake Prediction", seminar of the scientific association "ECOST" and Ministry of Ecology, Ministry of Absorption and scientific forum of repatriates, Jerusalem 2004.
- 2005. "Weather Anomalies and Earthquakes", Engineering Center Immigrants Sharon, Ideas, Projects and Technology, No.4, Israel
- 2006. "The quantum physics Paradox and Earthquake", Eng. Cen. Immig.. Sharon Ideas, Projects, and Technol., No.5, Israel* 2007. "Method for Earthquake Prediction", Patent Application No 16790/2, Israel, and ECOST, 10th Annual Ecological Immigrant Scientist Conference, Jerusalem
- 2008. "Global Warming and Earthquakes", The ECOST 11th Annual Ecolog. Sci. Conference, Jerusalem
- 2010. "On the 20th anniversary of the repatriation to Israel", Conference in Honor of the Contribution of Immigrant Scientists to the Advancement of Science and Awarding of Prizes to Outstanding Scientists, Tel-Aviv University
- 2010. "The Anomalous Hottest Summer of 2010 and Earthquakes", The House of Scientists by Weizmann Institute of Science at the Rehovot,
- 2011. " The Forecast Materializes again", The House of Scientists by Weizmann Institute of Science at the Rehovot, Internet Site: rehes.org
- 2011. "Global Changes of the Climate and Causes", The 39th Conference of the Israel Society of Ecology and Environmental Sciences, Israel
