= Moti Sasson =

Israeli politician

- מוטי ששון
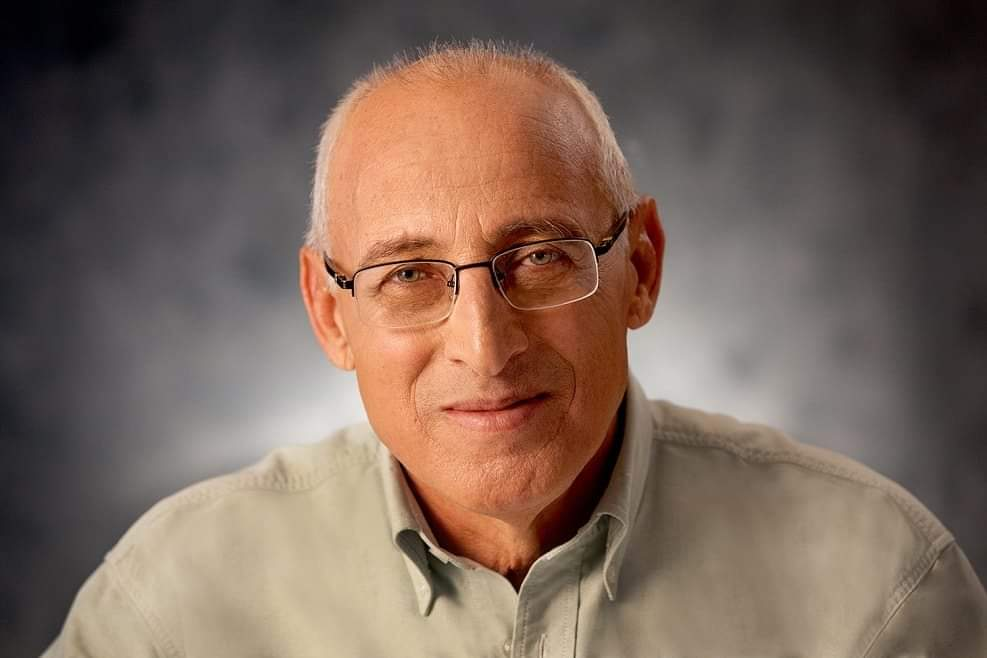
- Moti Sasson in 2023

Mayor of Holon
- In office 10 November 1993 – 18 March 2024
- Preceded by: Moshe Rom
- Succeeded by: Shai Keinan

Personal details
- Born: 28 February 1947 (age 79) Holon, Israel
- Party: Labor

Moti Sasson (Hebrew: מוטי ששון; born 28 February 1947) is an Israeli politician who served as the fifth mayor of Holon from 1993 to 2024. He was deputy and acting mayor between 1984–1989. He has worked hard to generate an image of the city as a "Children's city", establishing the Holon Children's Museum, and large gardens and play parks around the city. Under his leadership Holon has been awarded 5 gold stars by the Council for a beautiful Israel.

== Early life and education ==
Moti Sasson was born on 28 February 1947 in Holon to a Syrian Jewish family from Aleppo and completed his education at Bialik Elementary School and Kugel High School in Holon. He is a graduate of the History of the Middle East, Arabic language and literature department of Tel Aviv University, and has a master's degree in Business Management from the Hebrew University of Jerusalem. Later, he earned a doctorate in Political Science at Bar-Ilan University, specializing in public policy.

== Mayor of Holon ==
Sasson was elected mayor of Holon for the first time in 1993.

In 2010, he was named one of the world's top 10 mayors by the British magazine Monocle.

In 2013, Forbes Israel ranked Sasson as the second-best mayor in Israel. A month later, he was granted the Knight of Quality Government Award in the local authority category.

He resigned from the Labor Party in early 2020 following a crisis of trust between himself and Labor Party chairman Amir Peretz.

During the 2024 Israeli municipal elections, held on February 27, he lost reelection by a large margin to Likud member Shai Keinan, finishing in third place. His term as mayor concluded on 18 March 2024, after 30 years in office.
