= Heinecke =

Heinecke is a German surname. Notable people with the surname include:

- Andreas Heinecke, German academic and activist
- Birgit Heinecke (born 1957), East German handball player
- Herman Heinecke (1869–1906), American politician
- Kurt Heinecke, American composer
- Owen Heinecke (born 2003), American football player
- William Heinecke (born 1949), American-born Thai businessman

== See also ==
- Heinicke a similar surname
