= Dialogue in Silence =

- Established: 1997
- Location: Dialogue Social Enterprise, Hamburg, Germany
- Director: Andreas Heinecke & Orna Cohen
- Website: www.dialogue-in-silence.com

Dialogue in Silence is an exhibition about non-verbal communication, where participants discover a repertoire of expression possibilities with the help of deaf and hearing impaired guides and trainers. Participants enter an area of complete silence, wearing noise-cancelling headsets, and experience an environment that helps them discover openness, empathy and an enhanced power of concentration. Throughout the entire exhibition tour, a reversal of roles is created: hearing visitors lose their usual routines of articulating themselves and discover a new repertoire of non-verbal expression. They experience a different openness and empathy towards "the other".

== Background and history ==
In 2005, the World Health Organization (WHO) estimated 278 million people worldwide having moderate to profound hearing loss in both ears or are born deaf.

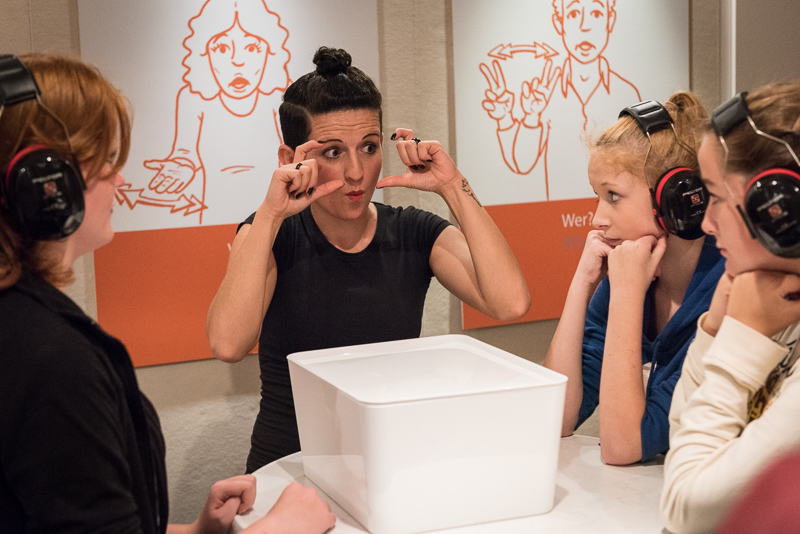
Dialogue in Silence Guide with visitors

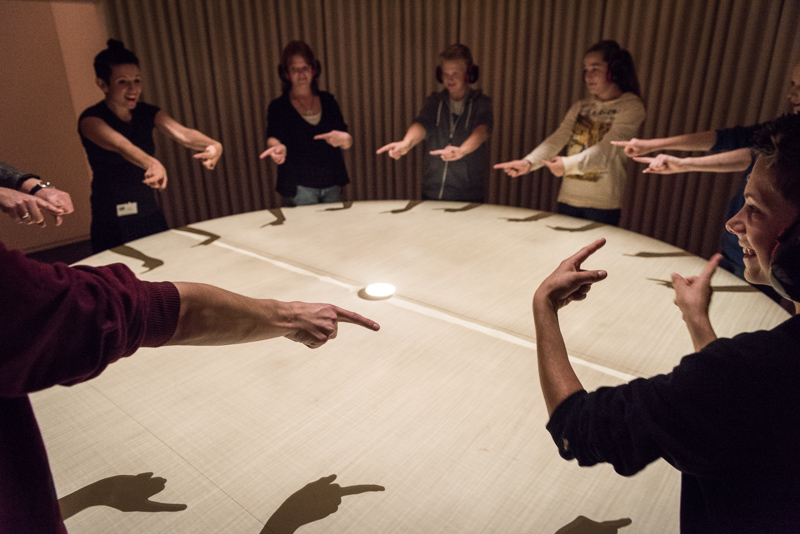
Gallery of Hands

"The impact of hearing impairment on a child's speech, language, education and social integration depends on the level and type of hearing impairment, and the age of onset, especially if it begins before the age when speech normally develops."

The prototype of Dialogue in Silence was called “Schattensprache”. Focusing on silent communication it was presented for the first time 1998 in Frankfurt. Orna Cohen and Andreas Heinecke then developed this model further into the large exhibition format of today. In 2003 they introduced the new concept with great success to the public in Paris at the “Cité des Sciences et l’Industrie”. In 2006 the exhibition was established as first permanent exhibition at the Children’s Museum in Holon, Israel. In 2008 and 2009 Mexico hosted the exhibition at the Children Museum in Papalote. In Germany, the Museum für Kommunikation in Frankfurt presented the exhibition in 2010 and 2011. So did the DASA Museum in Dortmund in 2009. In September 2014 Dialogue in Silence became the second permanent exhibition at the Dialoghaus in Hamburg, next to Dialogue in the Dark. In 2015, the exhibition Dialogue in Silence also became a permanent exhibition in Istanbul, Turkey. In August 2017, a 30-days-trial will run in Japan, preparing for a longer exhibition in 2020.

Corporate learning workshops are offered as a spin off from the actual exhibition. All Dialogue in Silence exhibitions and corporate learning workshops are handled by Dialogue Social Enterprise GmbH, Hamburg.

== The exhibition layout ==
»Dialogue in Silence« is an exhibition that invites visitors into a world of silence. Different forms of expression are used here and language must be visible in order to be understood. Hearing-impaired guides lead visitors through the exhibition, which is totally soundproof. It is the encounter which lies at the heart of the experience. At the same time, a reversal of roles is created: hearing people are torn out of social routine and familiar perception. They discover their repertoire of non-verbal expression in order to communicate creatively by gestures and body language. Hearing-impaired people, who by virtue of their experience and ability to sign are more competent, support the visitors and become ambassadors of a world without sound which is no way poorer – but different.

The exhibition consists of a series of circular rooms dedicated to different aspects of non-verbal communication. All walls are specially constructed with a fabric absorbing sound to the best of effects, while providing a monochromatic background. The visitor’s visual concentration is not distracted and full attention can be is given to the visual experience and communication means. Each room has a name, indicating the activity it hosts. In each room, the scenario is broken down into several short stages thus creating a sense of progression:

- Invitation to Silence - Entrance into the world of silence
- Dance of Hands - Focus on hands and their capacity to express
- Gallery of Faces - Work on facial expressions and how to decipher them
- Play of Signs - Introduction to sign language
- Forum of Figures - Learning about the body's capacity to express via postures and movement
- Dialogue Room - Dialogue between visitors and the facilitator with the support of an interpreter

Whereas headphones are worn during the first 5 rooms, visitors are invited to go back to verbal language in the last room to get into an intensive dialogue with the tour guide and learn more about deaf culture and

== Venues ==
Dialogue in Silence currently presented in the following venues around the world:

- Dialoghaus Hamburg, Germany: Dialog im Stillen
- Children's Museum Holon, Israel: Invitation to Silence
- Diyalog Müzesi Istanbul, Turkey: Sessizlikte Dyjalog
