= Shai Keinan =

Mayor of Holon

- שי קינן
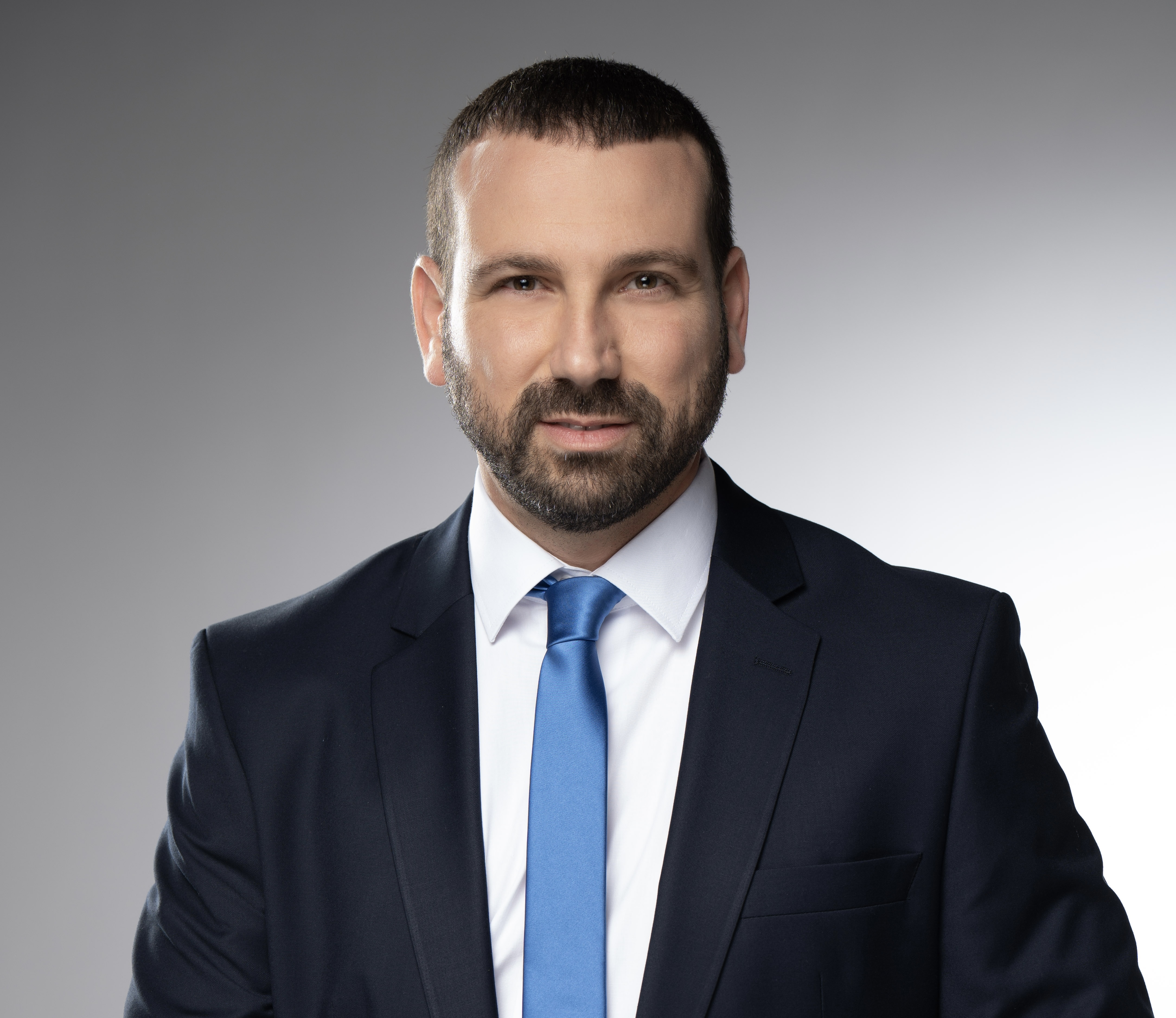

Mayor of Holon
- Incumbent
- Assumed office 18 March 2024
- Preceded by: Moti Sasson

Personal details
- Born: 29 October 1981 (age 45) Kfar Shalem, Tel Aviv, Israel
- Party: Likud
- Children: 2
- Education: Reichman University

Shai Keinan (Hebrew: שי קינן; born 29 October 1981) is an Israeli politician, mayor of Holon since March 2024.

== Early life and education ==
Born on 29 October 1981 in the neighbourhood of Kfar Shalem, Tel Aviv, Israel, he moved to Holon at the age of 9.

Keinan holds a bachelor's degree in government and diplomacy from Reichman University and a master's degree in public policy from the Executive Program at Tel Aviv University.

== Political career ==
In October 2013, he was elected to the Holon city council, and served as deputy mayor and a member of the city administration. As deputy mayor, Keinan led the city's budgeting of 100 million shekels for the construction of a northern exit at the Holon East Interchange, which opened in early 2024, and established the municipal policing project funded by the Ministry of Public Security, which added dozens of police officers to the city.

In the 2024 Israeli municipal elections held on 27 February, he was elected mayor of Holon, unseating Moti Sasson after 30 years in office. He took office on 18 March 2024.

== Personal life ==
Keinan lives in Holon, is divorced, and is a father of two.
