= Dialogue in the Dark =

Blindness organisation and exhibition

Coordinates: 53.546°N 10.002°E

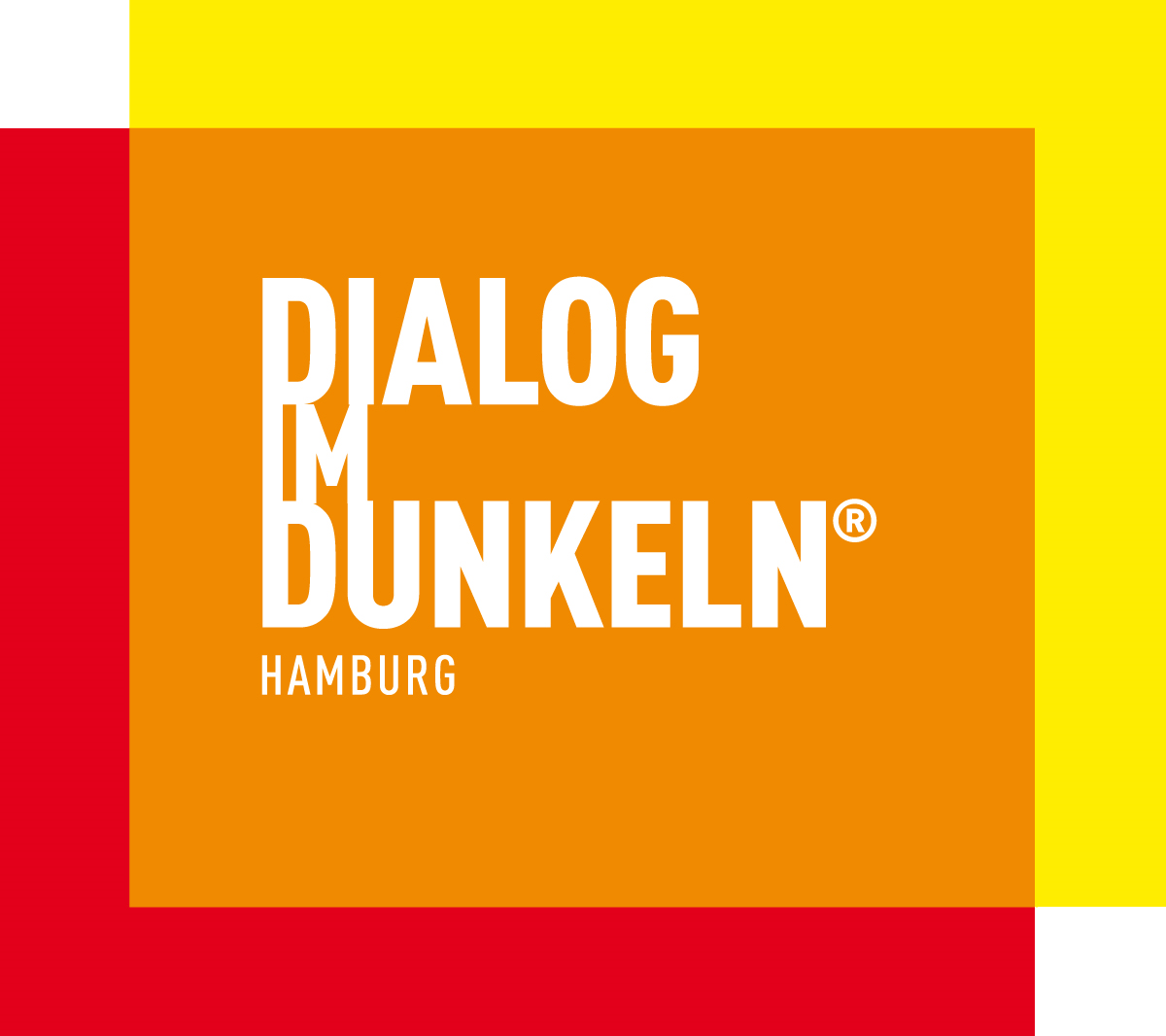
- Established: 1988
- Location: Dialogue Social Enterprise, Hamburg, Germany
- Director: Andreas Heinecke
- Website: www.dialogue-in-the-dark.com

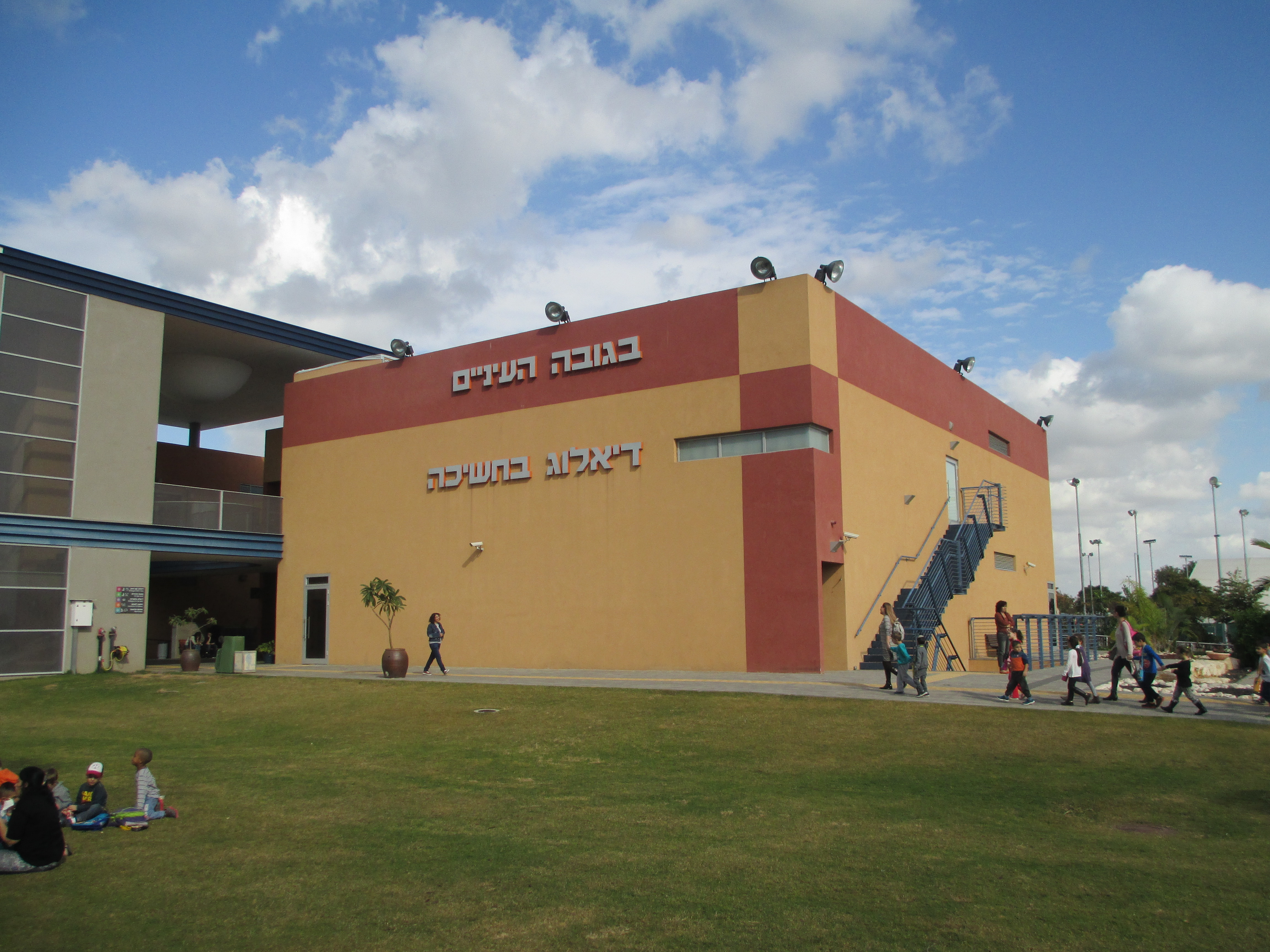
Dialogue in the Dark building in Holon Children's Museum In Israel

Dialogue in the Dark ("Dialog in the Dark" in American promotional materials) is an awareness raising exhibition and franchise, as well as a social business. In Dialogue in the Dark, blind guides lead visitors in small groups through different settings in absolute darkness. Through this visitors learn how to interact without sight by using their other senses, as well as experience what it is like to be blind. The exhibition is organized as a social franchising company, which offers the exhibition as well as business workshops, and has created jobs for the blind, disabled, and disadvantaged worldwide. The exhibition aims to change mindsets on disability and diversity, and increase tolerance for “otherness”. More than 9 million visitors have gone through an experience in the Dark and thousands of blind guides and facilitators find employment through exhibitions and workshops.

== History ==
Dialogue in the Dark was founded by Andreas Heinecke in 1988. It had its premiere in Frankfurt, Germany. For more than 10 years it toured throughout the world as a travelling exhibition in museums or as a special event in a fair or festival. Since then, Dialogue Social Enterprise, the company that owns the brand, has turned the exhibition into a franchise. The first permanent exhibition was established in Hamburg, Germany (Dialog im Dunkeln) in April 2000. There have been exhibitions in more than 150 cities in over 30 countries. Dialogue in the Dark is currently available in 21 countries in different formats. Some of these countries or regions include China, Taiwan, Hong Kong, Japan, Italy, Israel, South Korea, Germany, Greece, Austria, Russia, the USA and Singapore.

== Idea ==
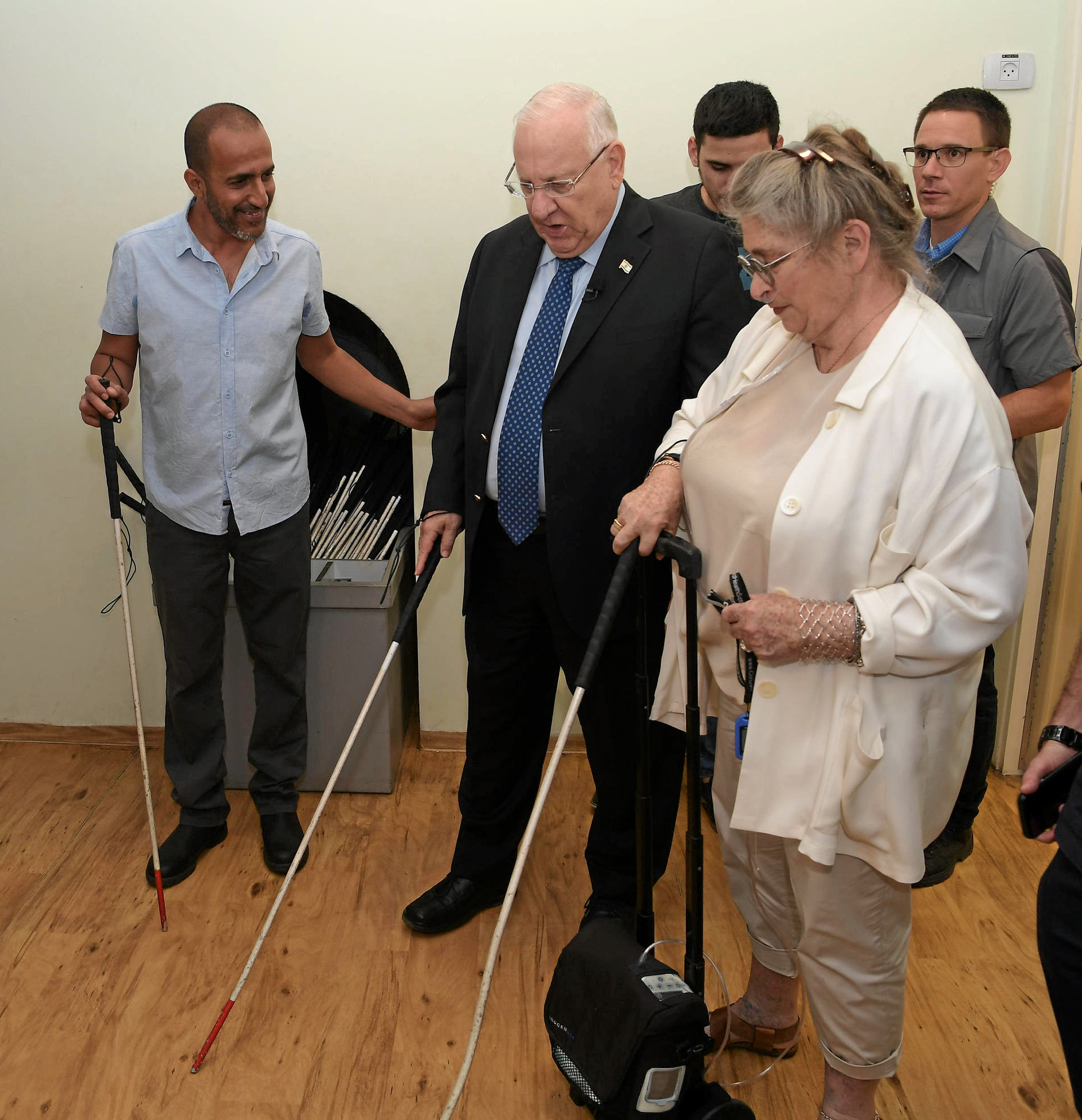
Reuven Rivlin, President of Israel and his wife, Nechama Rivlin, in a visit in Dialogue in the Dark exhibition in Holon to mark the day of blindness, June 2018

The main concept of the exhibition is role reversal, as within the exhibit the blind become "sighted" and while the seeing become blind. Furthermore, the sighted get out of their social routines and blind people give them a sense of orientation and mobility. During and after the tour visitors have the opportunity to ask the guide questions.

== Mission ==
Dialogue in the Dark has two main goals. The first is to increase the public’s awareness of and tolerance for “otherness”. According to its website, Dialogue in the Dark's second goal is to create jobs for disadvantaged people by turning perceived deficits into potential assets.
