= Holon =

Coordinates: 32°01′N 34°46′E

Holon חולון (Hebrew)
- City

Hebrew transcription(s)
  - ISO 259: Ḥolon
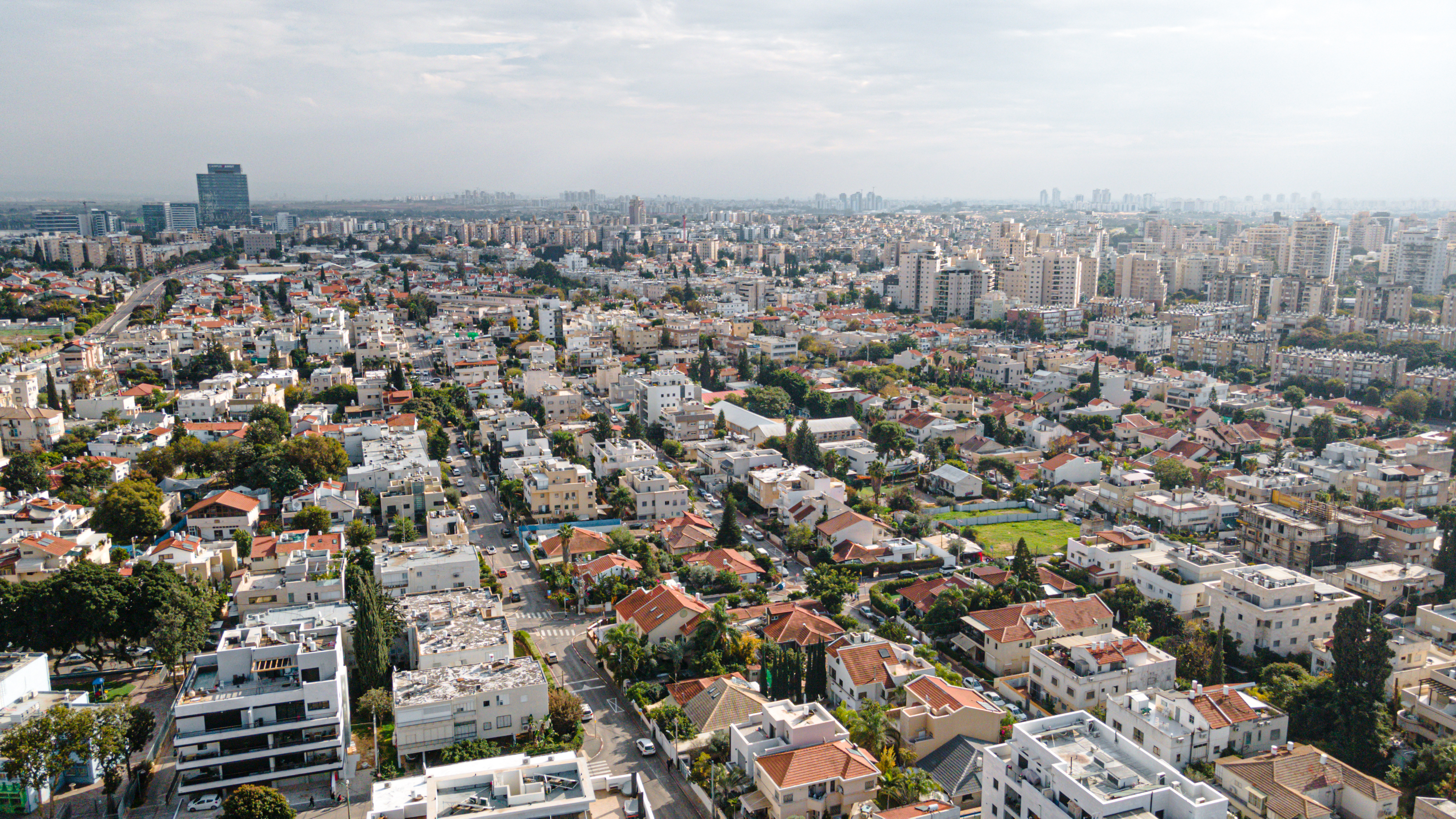
- View of Holon

- Flag Coat of arms
- Nickname: Children's City
- Interactive map of Holon
- Location within Central Israel Location within Israel
- Country: Israel
- District: Tel Aviv
- Natural Region: Holon
- Founded: 1936

Government
  - Type: Mayor–council
  - Body: Municipality of Holon
  - Mayor: Shai Keinan (Likud)

Area
  - Total: 18,927 dunams (18.927 km^{2}; 7.308 sq mi)

Population (2024)
  - Total: 191,829
  - Density: 10,135/km^{2} (26,250/sq mi)

Ethnicity
  - Jews and others: 99.8%
  - Arabs: 0.2%
- Time zone: UTC+2 (IST)
  - Summer (DST): UTC+3 (IDT)
- Name meaning: (Little) sand
- Website: www.holon.muni.il

Holon (Hebrew: חולון, pronounced [χoˈlon]) is a city in the Tel Aviv District of Israel, located south of Tel Aviv. Holon is part of the Gush Dan metropolitan area. In 2026, it had a population of 174,600, making it the tenth most populous city in Israel. Holon has the second-largest industrial zone in Israel, after Haifa.

Holon is home to more than half of the world's total Samaritan population. The Samaritan neighborhood of Neve Pinchas, established in 1954, has its own synagogues and street signs in Samaritan Hebrew.

== Etymology ==
The name of the city comes from the Hebrew word חוֹלוֹן holon, meaning "(little) sand". The name Holon also appears in the Bible: "And Holon with its suburbs, and Debir with its suburbs" (Book of Joshua 21:15).

== History ==
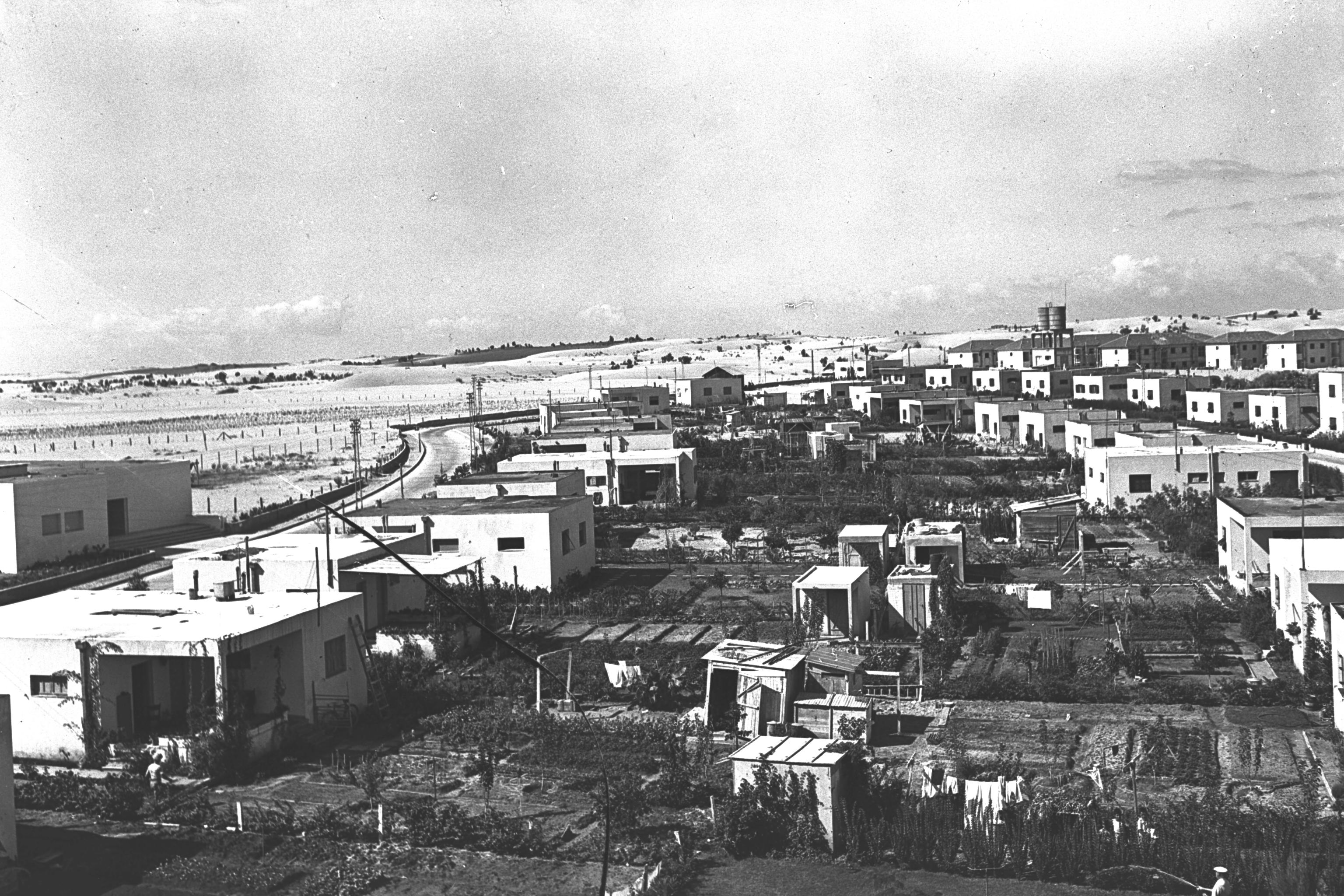
Kiryat Avoda, Holon, 1938

Holon was founded in 1935 on sand dunes six kilometres (3 1/2 miles) from Tel Aviv. The Łódzia textile factory was established there by Jewish immigrants from Łódź, Poland, along with many other industrial enterprises. In February 1936, the cornerstone was laid for Kiryat Avoda, a Modernist building complex designed by architect Joseph Neufeld to solve the shortage of housing for municipal workers.

In the early months of the 1948 Arab–Israeli War, Holon was on the front line, with constant shooting taking place on the border with the village of Tel al-Rish to its northwest—a suburb of Arab Jaffa—and clashes also in the direction of the town of Yazur to the east. An attack by the Holon-based Haganah militia units on Tel A-Rish was repulsed with considerable losses.

After the establishment of the state, Holon expanded to include Tel A-Rish (renamed Tel Giborim, "The Mound of the Heroes") and the orange groves of Yazur.

In February 2001, a Palestinian terrorist attack at a crowded bus stop in Holon killed eight Israeli civilians and injured twenty-five. The image of Holon as a working-class dormitory community has changed over the years.

Through municipal efforts, the city has been rebranded as a child-friendly city. It offers family attractions such as the Yamit Water Park, the Israeli Children's Museum, and the Israel Museum of Cartoons and Comics.

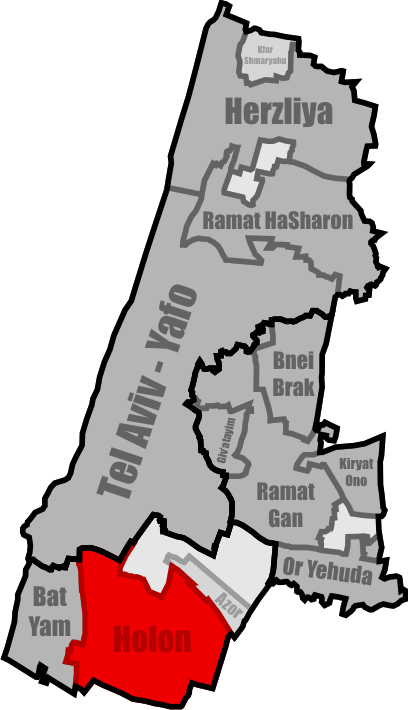
Location of Holon in the Tel Aviv District

Historic landmarks in Holon slated for preservation include Derech Habitachon ("Safe Road"), paved during the 1948 Arab–Israeli War; water towers in the Moledet and Azor neighborhoods; Hosmasa, a building used by the Haganah; the pillbox guard post; Stroma Square, Mansbach health clinic, Hameshakem building, the Agrobank neighborhood and two schools – Bialik and Shenkar. A new neighborhood, Migdalim Bashdera, is under construction, with plans for 23 upscale residential towers, a new city hall, several cultural and commercial centers, some of them already built. A French urban planner was commissioned to design a north-south boulevard with pedestrian walks, bicycle paths, sports fields, parks and waterfalls. The last undeveloped land reserve remaining in Holon is the H-500 Holon plan, that consists of approximately 4,080 dunams (408 hectares; 1,010 acres) in the south of the city, and is intended to consist of 13,700 dwelling units in total.

On June 19, 2025, an Iranian missile strike impacted a residential block in the city, leaving it in ruins and injuring dozens of people.

== Demographics ==
Historical population
Year	Pop.	±%
1972	100,000	—
1983	133,300	+33.3%
1995	161,800	+21.4%
2008	176,300	+9.0%
2022	192,655	+9.3%
2024	191,829	−0.4%

== Local government ==
=== Mayors ===
- Chaim Kugel – 1940 to 1953
- Pinhas Eylon – 1953 to 1987
- Haim Sharon – 1987 to 1988
- Moshe Rom – 1988 to 1993
- Moti Sasson – 1993 to 2024
- Shai Keinan – 2024 to present

== Culture ==
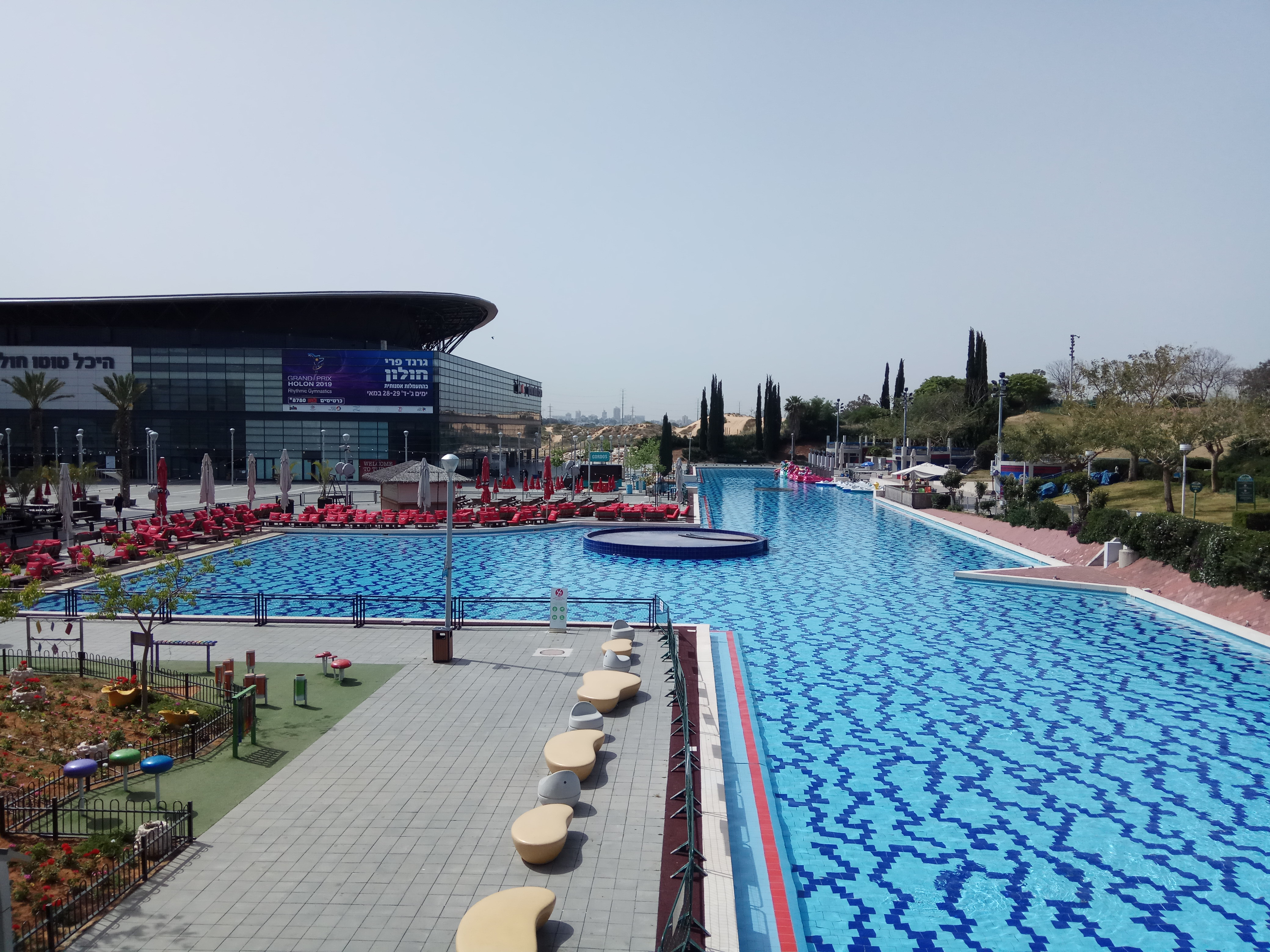
Peres Park

Holon hosts a variety of springtime events, including the Yemay Zemer (Days of Song) Festival during Passover and a Women's Festival in March, both at the Holon Theater. Holon is also one of the host cities for the Rhythmic Gymnastics Grand Prix Series in March. Israeli violinist Pinchas Zukerman runs a summer music camp in the city for young violinists. Since the election of Mayor Moti Sasson in 1993, many cultural projects have been inaugurated. Billing itself as a "children's city," Holon is home to the Holon Children's Museum and the Mediatheque youth theater. Holon also plays host each year to a street carnival in celebration of the Jewish holiday of Purim, the Adloyada. Thousands of children dress up in costumes and the streets close down for a parade featuring colorful floats.

In October 2013, Holon hosted major international designers who arrived for Holon Fashion Week (known as HoF13), among them milliner Stephen Jones and BioCouture founder Suzanne Lee. Cinematheque Holon hosts the only digital arts and media arts festival in Israel, Print Screen Festival. The festival was established 2010.

=== Museums and arts centers ===
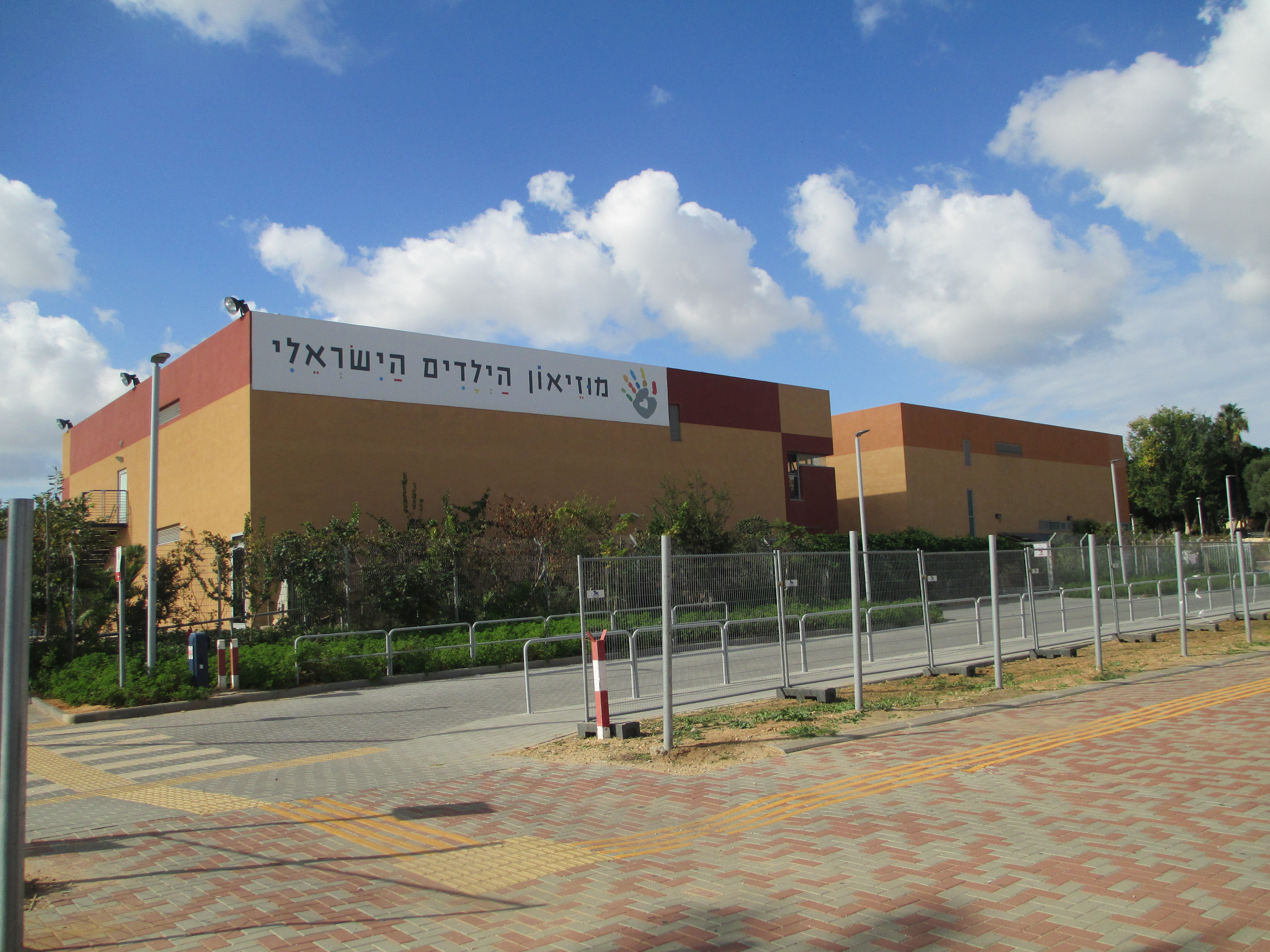
Holon Children's Museum

- Design Museum Holon – the first Israeli museum of design. opened in 2010 near the "Médiathèque" and the Faculty of Design of Holon Institute of Technology.
- Holon Children's Museum – inaugurated in 2001, located in Peres Park in the southeast of the city.
- Israeli Center for Digital Art – inaugurated in 2001, promotes digital art in Israel.
- Israeli Museum of Caricature and Comics – inaugurated in 2007, a museum that presents works by Israeli artists on the subjects of comics and cartoons.
- Médiathèque (Holon) – inaugurated in 2004, one part of it is the largest and most sophisticated public library in Israel. The second part is a theater for young people.
- Historical Vehicle Museum – contains a rare collection of "Egged" historical buses, some of them from before the establishment of the state. All buses are restored to their authentic condition and are roadworthy. The museum is located on the grounds of the "Egged" Holon parking lot in the south of the city, in Kiryat Ben-Gurion.
- The Puppet Theater Center – The center contains the Museum of the Art of Puppetry, a performance hall and the School of the Art of Puppetry. The International Festival of Puppet Theater and Film, featuring puppet makers and artists from Israel and around the world, has been held annually in July since 1995 at the Puppet Theater Center in Holon.

In the municipal budget for 2025, approved on December 23, 2024, Mayor Keinan implemented drastic cuts to the funding of the city's museums: the budget for the Israeli Museum of Caricature and Comics was reduced by 100%; the budget for the Design Museum was reduced by 96%; the budget for the Children's Museum reduced by 60%; and the Puppet Theater Center was permanently closed.

=== Samaritan community ===
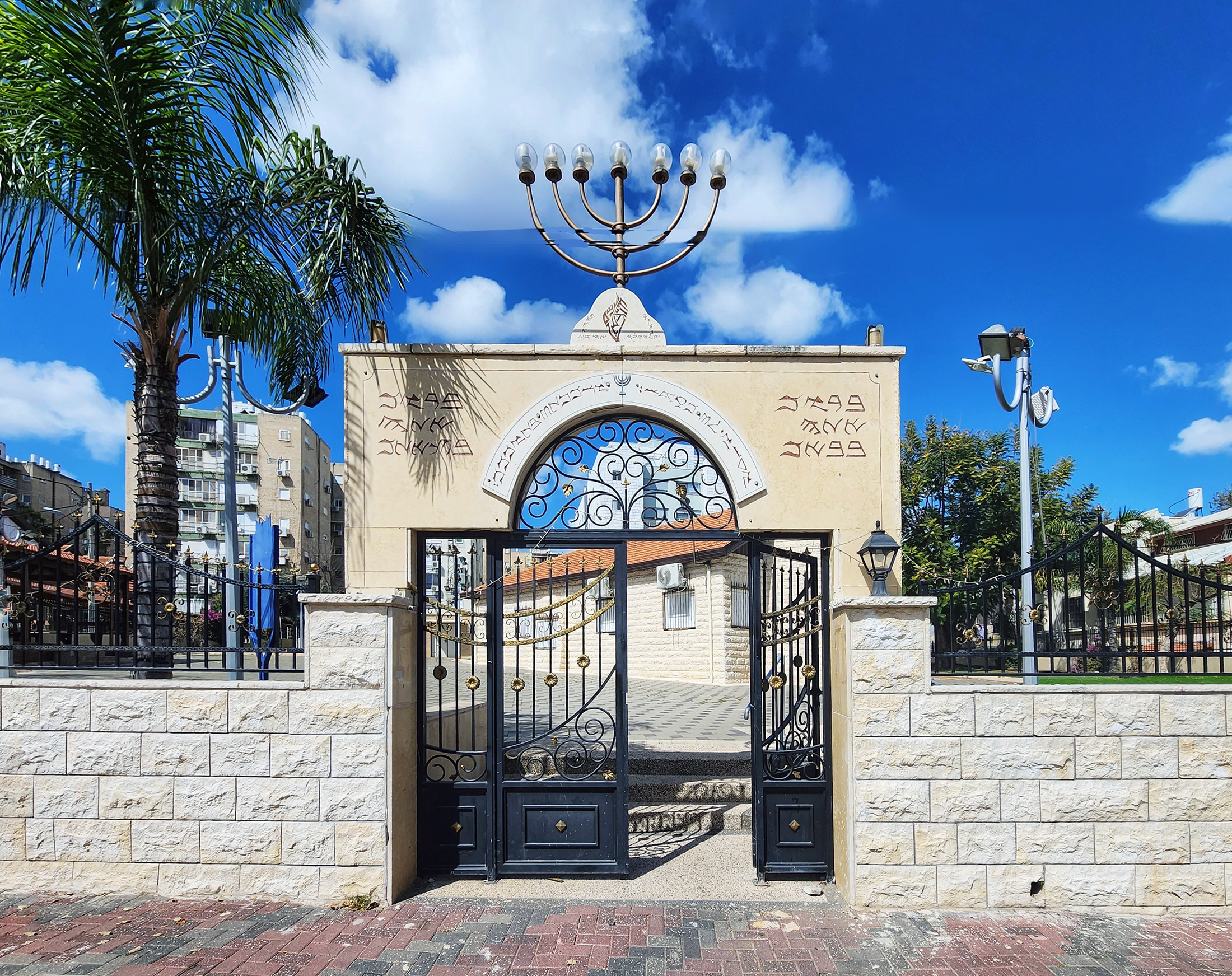
Neve Pinchas' Samaritan synagogue

In 1954, the president of Israel, Yitzhak Ben-Zvi, helped to establish a Samaritan quarter on the outskirts of Holon. The quarter was named Neve Pinchas after Pinhas Ben-Abraham, the high priest of the Samaritan community.

Holon is one of only two cities in the world to have a Samaritan community, the other being the village of Kiryat Luza on Mount Gerizim above Nablus on the West Bank.

== Health ==
Holon is the headquarters of the humanitarian organisation Save a Child's Heart, which provides cardiac healthcare to children worldwide. Founded in 1995, it is based at the Wolfson Medical Center. As of December 2025, it has brought more than 8,000 children from 75 countries to Israel.

== Transportation ==
Holon is served by Holon–Wolfson railway station and Holon Junction railway station of Israel Railways.

== Education ==
The Lycée Maïmonide Mikvé Israël and the Collège-Lycée franco-israélien Raymond Leven are located in Mikveh Israel, Holon.

The Holon Institute of Technology was founded in 1969.

== Sports ==
- Hapoel Holon (basketball) – premier league, national champion in 2008 and 2022, and state cup holder in 2009 and 2018
- Hapoel Tzafririm Holon F.C. (football)
- Holon yuvalim HC – multiple Ligat Ha'Al titles, usually the only representation of Israel in european competitions and a regular member of the European Cup

== Voting patterns ==
In the 2022 election, 56 percent of voters in Holon voted for the parties of the right-wing coalition led by Benjamin Netanyahu, while 41 percent voted for the parties of the center-left coalition led by Yair Lapid and 0.1 percent voted for the Arab parties.

In the 2026 election, 50 percent of voters in Holon voted for the parties of the right-wing coalition led by Benjamin Netanyahu, while 43 percent voted for the parties of the center-left coalition led by Gadi Eisenkot and 0.2 percent voted for the Arab parties. An additional 4.2 percent voted for the Reservists, and 1.6 percent voted for Amcha Yisrael. Voter turnout increased 9 percent from the 2022 election.

== Notable people ==
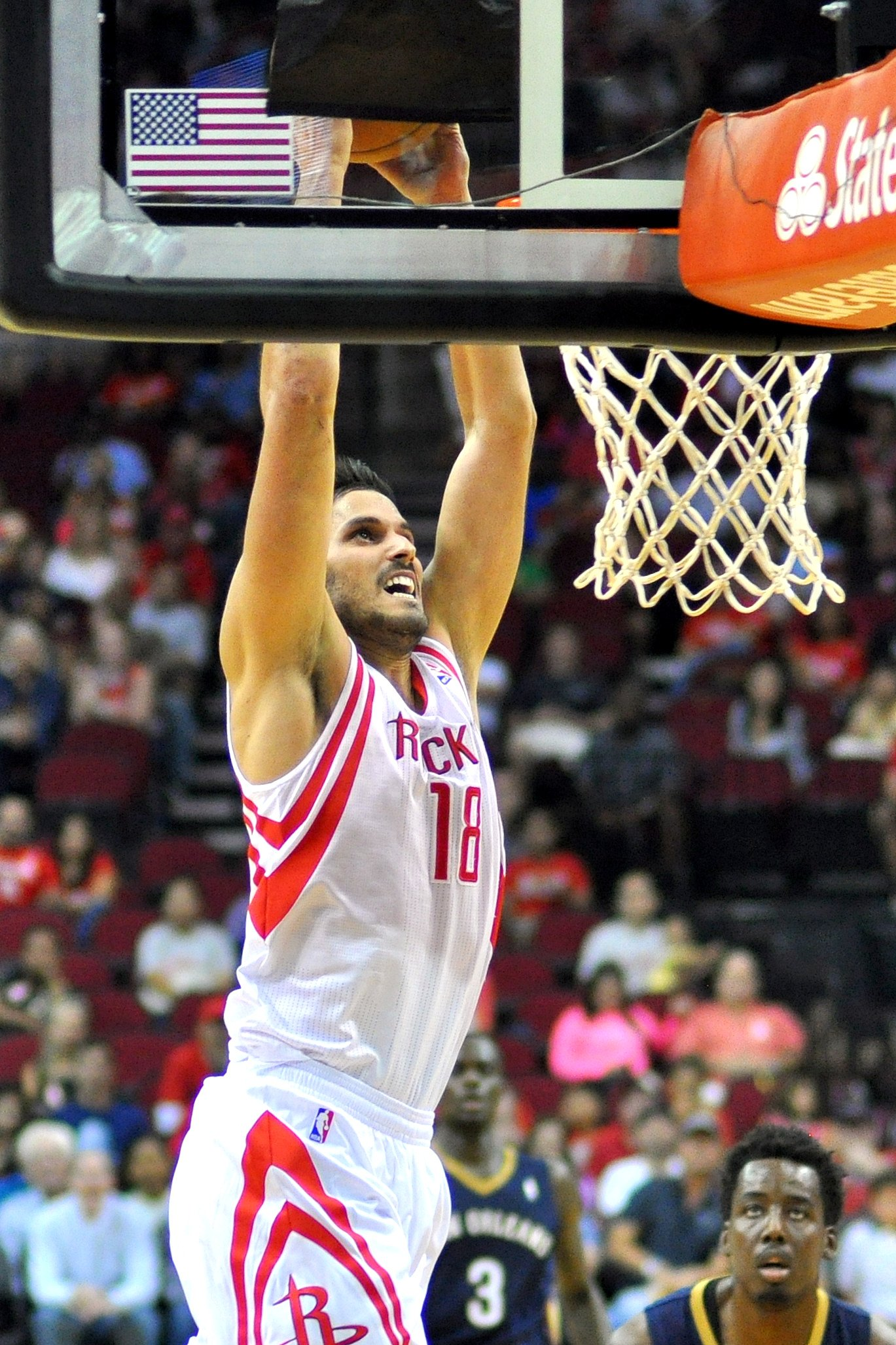
Omri Casspi, with the NBA's Houston Rockets

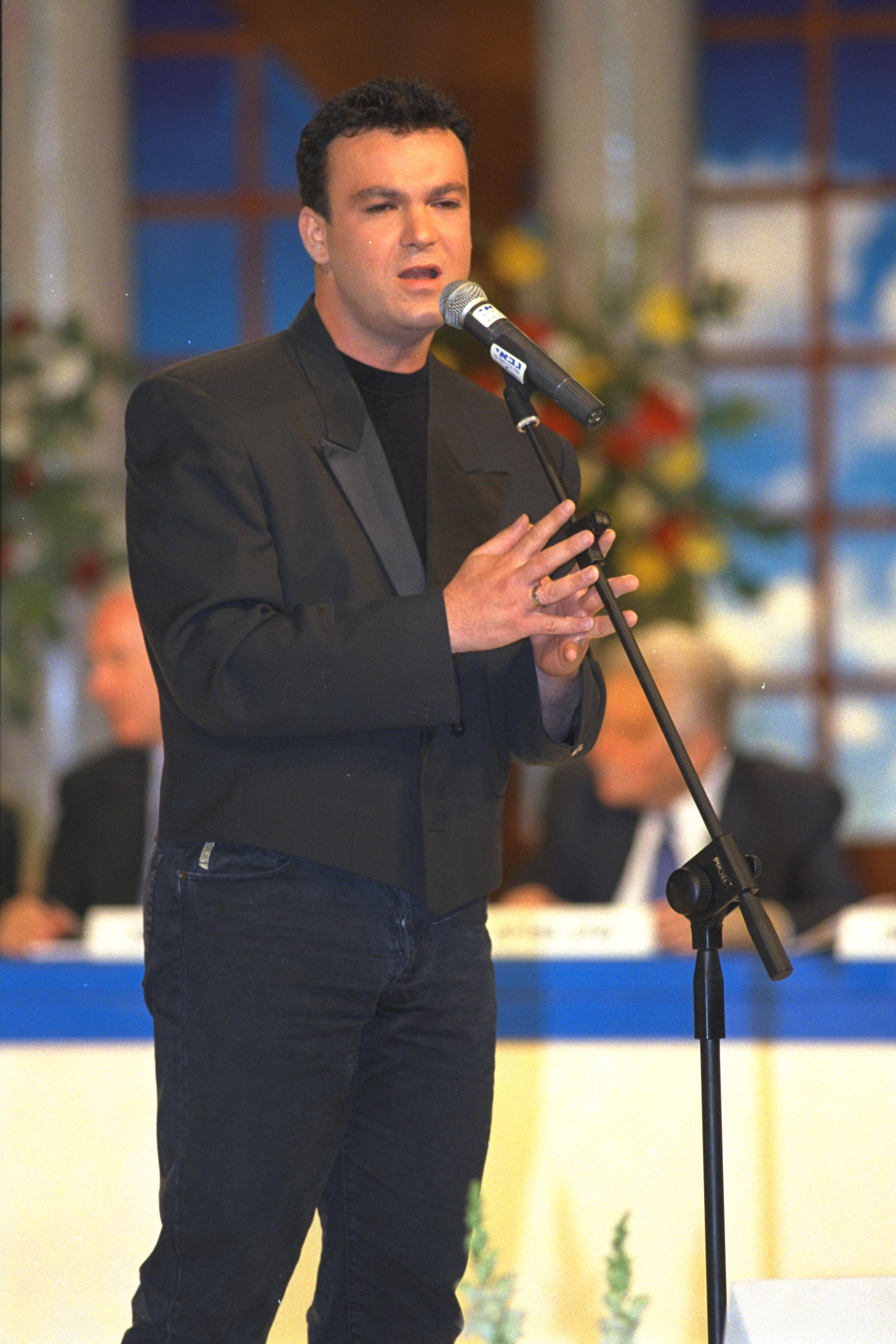
David D'Or

- Moshik Afia, singer
- Chen Aharoni, singer
- Oz Almog, Israeli-Austrian artist & author
- Rafi Amit, poker player
- Avraam Benaroya, Greek-Jewish socialist leader, founder of the Communist Party of Greece
- David Ben Dayan, football player
- Omri Casspi, NBA basketball player
- Eli Cohen, Israeli Minister of Foreign Affairs
- Bat-Sheva Dagan, Holocaust survivor, teacher, psychologist, author
- Moti Daniel, basketball player
- David D'Or, countertenor & composer; Israel's 2001 Singer of the Year
- Ilona Feher, violinist
- Barak Fever, sports journalist
- Tal Hen, footballer
- Dana International, pop singer
- Tomer Kapon, film and television actor
- Hila Klein, YouTuber
- Eran Kolirin, cinema director & script writer
- Aryeh Krishek, novelist and biographer
- Chen Kugel, Israeli pathologist who did an autopsy on Yahya Sinwar
- Stephane Legar, singer, dancer, and runway model
- Moran Mazor, singer
- Sofia Mechetner, model, the face of Dior
- Avihu Medina, composer, arranger, songwriter, and singer
- Adir Miller, actor, screenwriter and comedian
- Moshe Mizrahi, basketball player
- Lior Narkis, singer
- Lior Halfon Co-creator of Voca People and actor
- Avi Nimni, footballer
- Oren Nissim, footballer
- Chen Reiss, opera singer
- Irina Risenzon, rhythmic gymnast
- Shira Rishony, Olympic judoka
- Peter Roth, rock singer & composer
- Ben Sahar, football player
- Moti Sasson, Mayor of Holon
- Hezi Shai, IDF tank commander
- Sofi Tsedaka, actress, singer, television presenter and politician
- Arie Vardi, pianist & teacher
- Rahel Vigdozchik, Olympic rhythmic gymnast
- Amos Yaron, IDF major general
- Avraham Yosef, rabbi and son of Ovadia Yosef
- Rami Yosifov, guitarist of Teapacks
- Oren Zeitouni, footballer
- Moses Hacmon, artist, Trisha Paytas' spouse

== Twin towns – sister cities ==
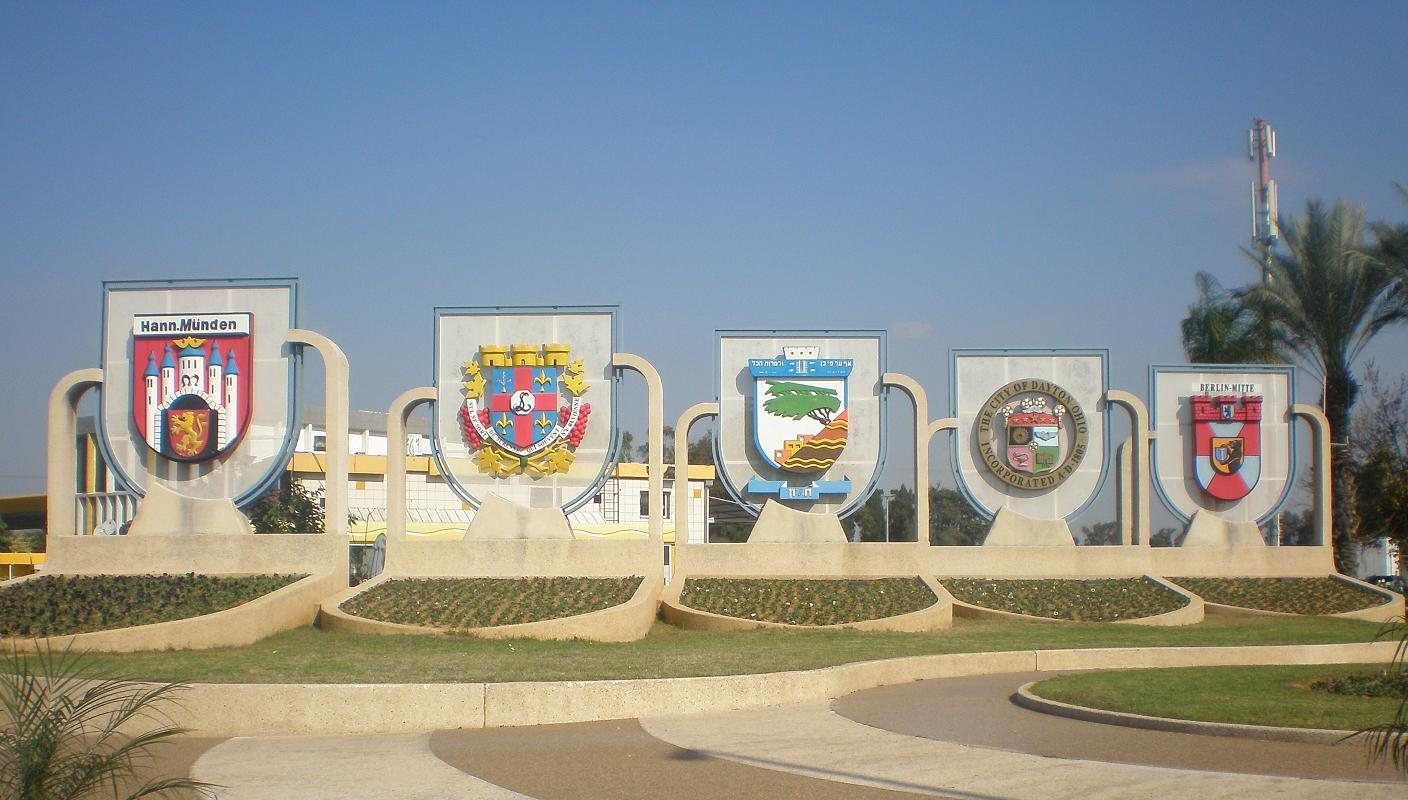
Sister city shields at the city entrance

Holon is twinned with:

- Andong, South Korea
- Anshan, China
- Cleveland, United States
- Dayton, United States
- Hann. Münden, Germany
- Mitte (Berlin), Germany
- Suresnes, France

== Gallery ==
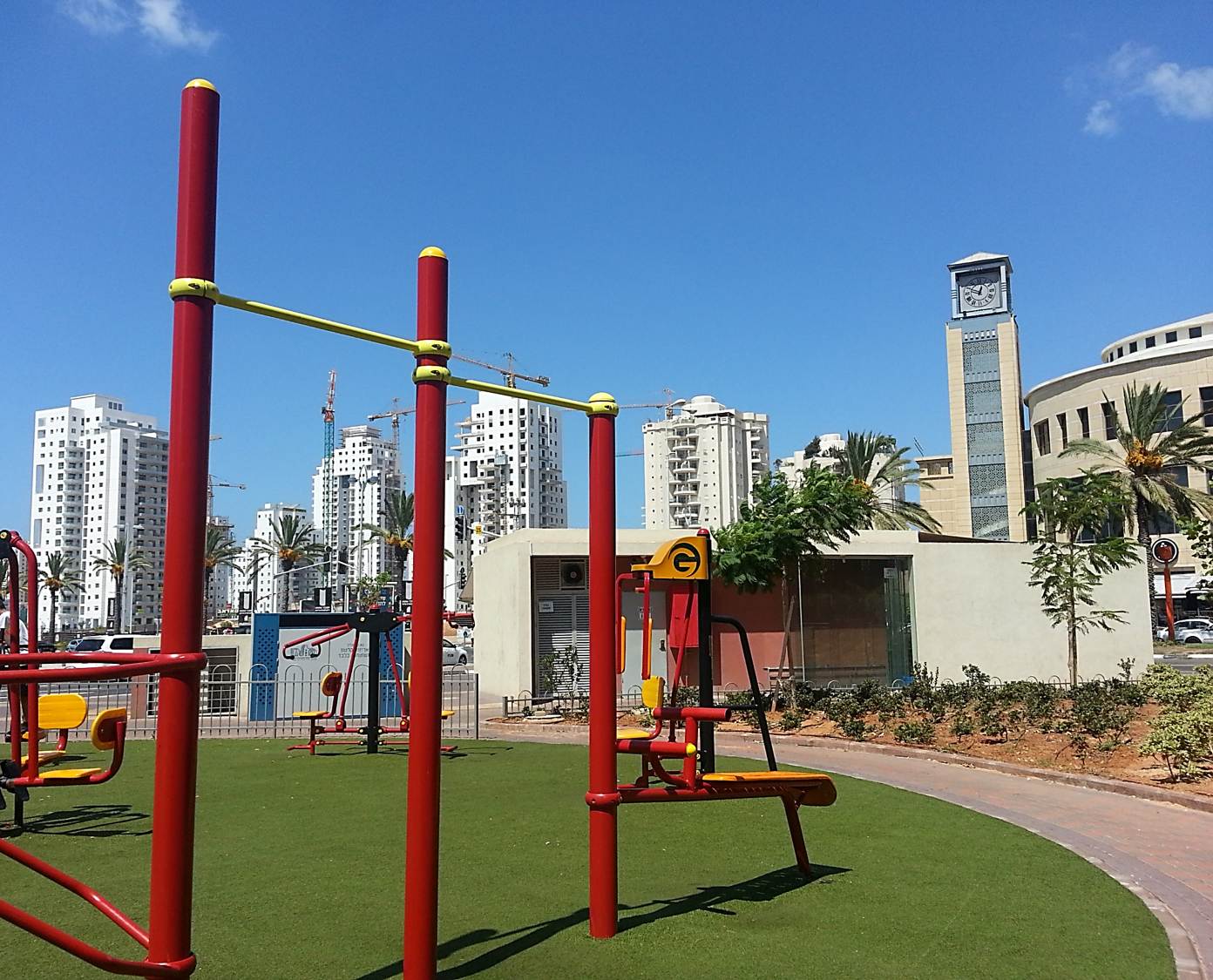
Park in Holon

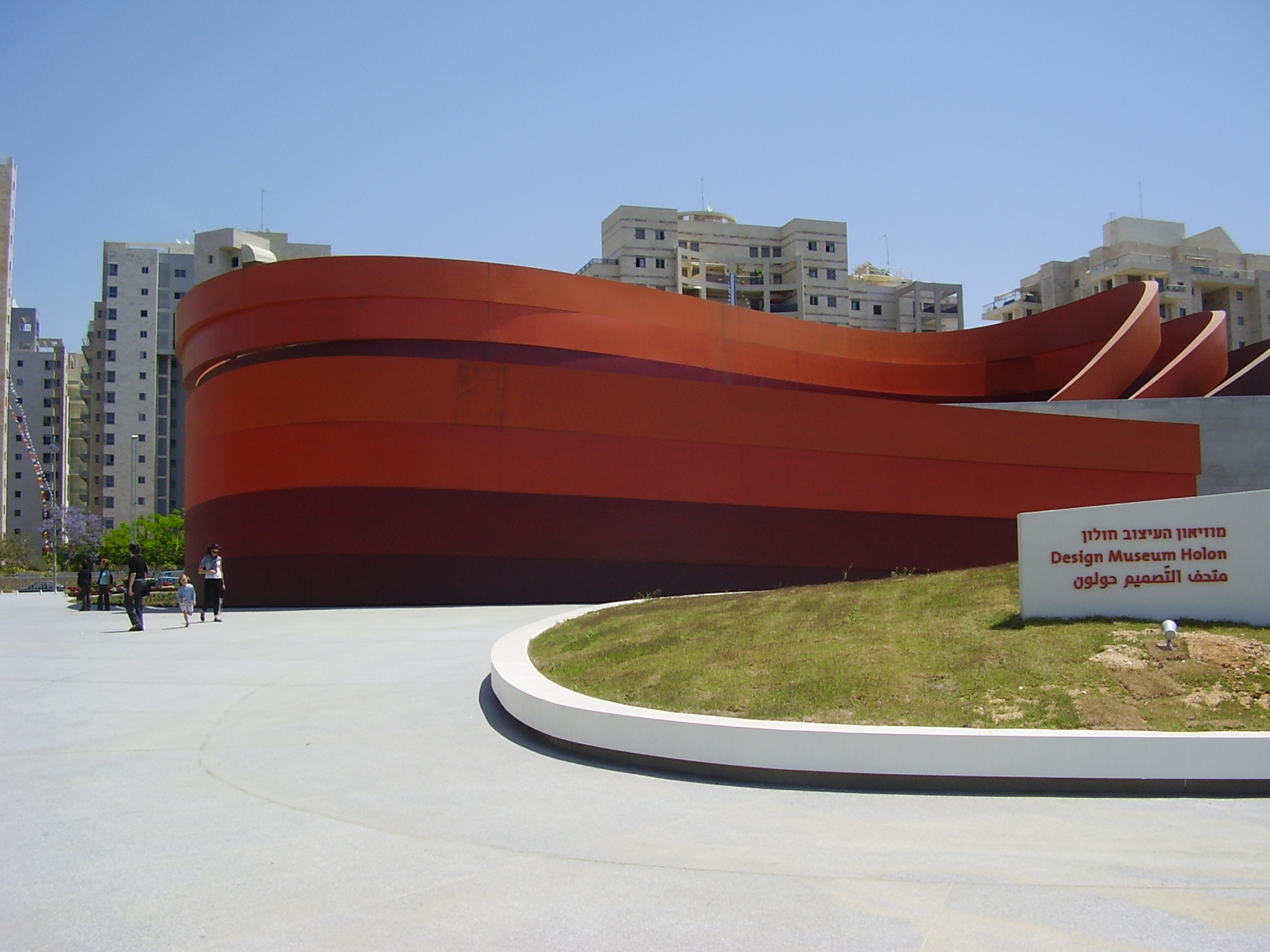
Design Museum Holon

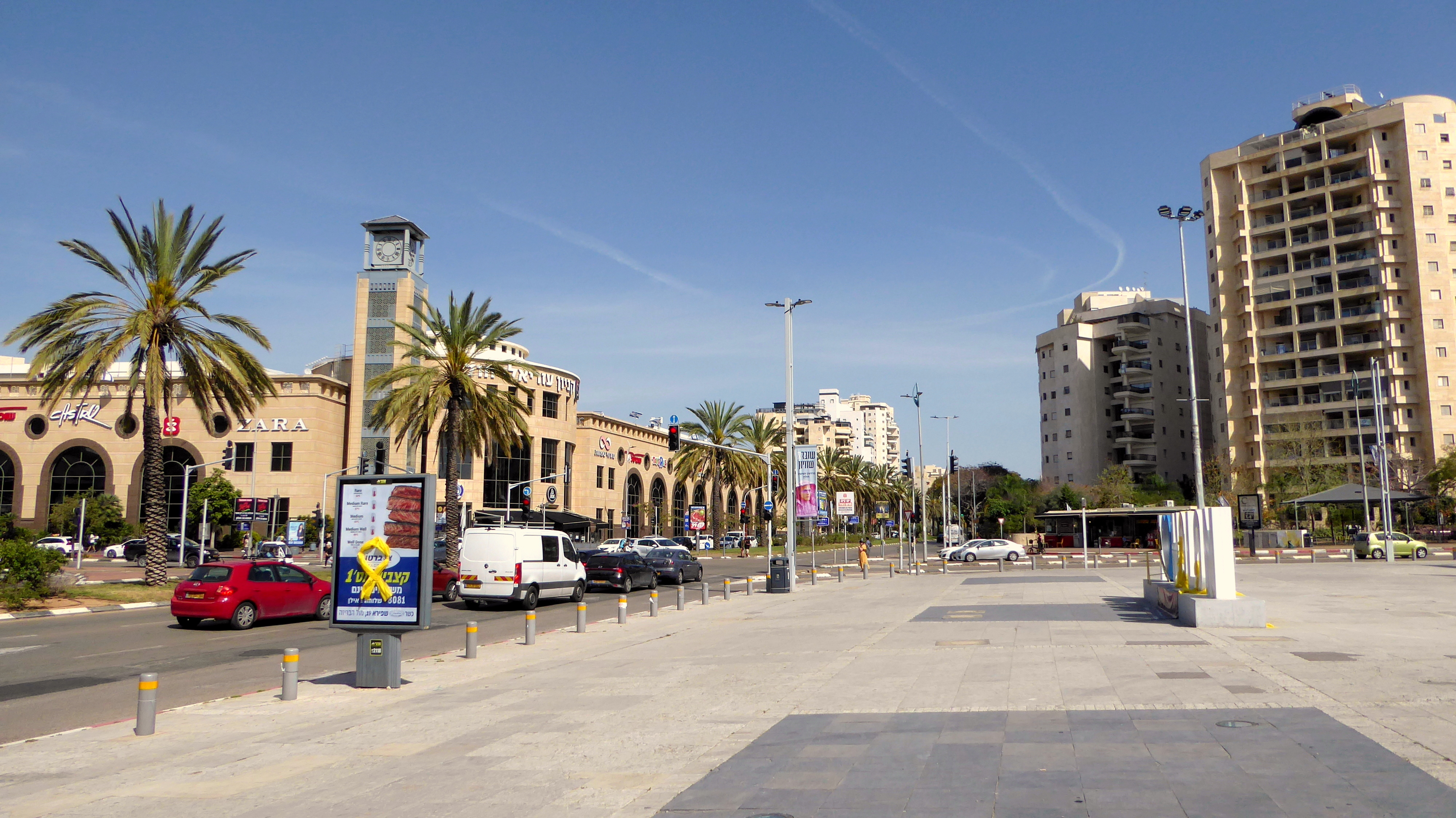
Holon Mall
