= Heinicke =

Heinicke is a German surname. Notable people with this surname include:

- Bettina Heinicke née Bettina Blumenberg (born 1962), German field hockey player
- Bianca Heinicke (born 1993), German web video producer
- Erika Heinicke (born 1939), German speed skater
- Herbert Heinicke (1905–1988), German chess master born in Brazil
- Hermann Heinicke (1863–1949), German-born violinist and music teacher in South Australia
- Megan Heinicke, known as Megan Tandy (born 1988), a Canadian biathlete
- Samuel Heinicke (1727–1790), German pioneer of education for the deaf
- Taylor Heinicke (born 1993), American football quarterback
- Victoria Heinicke née Victoria Palmer, American tennis player

== See also ==
Heinecke a similar surname
