= Kfar Shalem =

Neighbourhood in southeastern Tel Aviv

Coordinates: 32°3′6.38″N 34°48′21.36″E

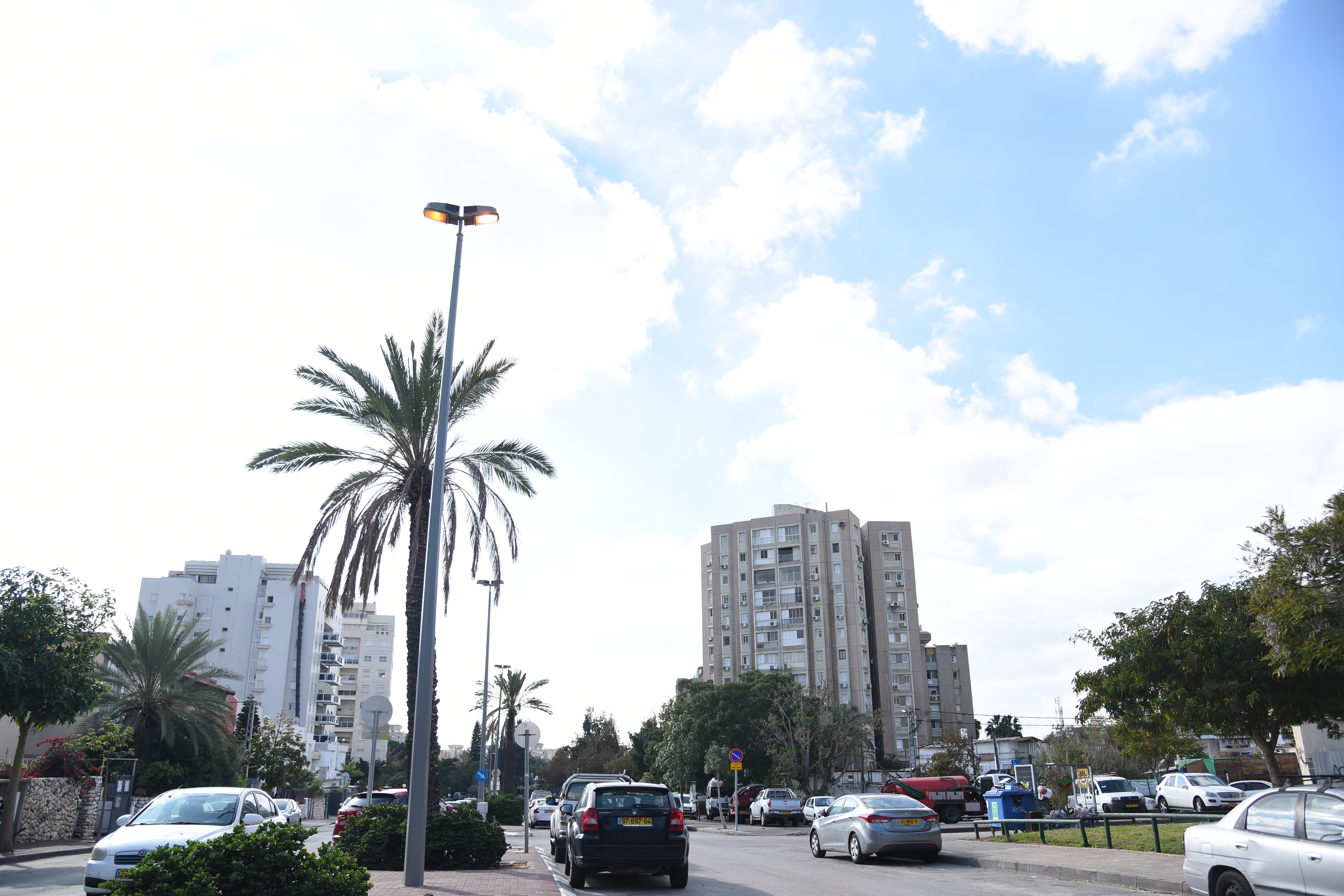
Kfar Shalem

Kfar Shalem (Hebrew: כפר שלם, lit. 'Shalem Village') is a neighbourhood in southeastern Tel Aviv, Israel. Salameh Street / Shalma Street in Tel Aviv is named after the Arab village of Salamah located on the site prior to 1948.

== History ==
Until 1948, the Arab village of Salama stood where Kfar Shalem is now located. In 1931, there were 800 houses and 3,691 residents in the village, mostly work migrants from Syria. On the eve of the 1948 Arab-Israeli War, the village had 7,600 residents, most of whom were refugees from the surrounding area, who had moved to Salama. The residents also included some wealthy people from Jaffa who built country homes there.

In 1947, Salama became a hub for terror and sniping activities against Jewish traffic to Jerusalem and to the south, as well as for Tel Aviv neighbouring neighbourhoods. Salama was occupied on 29 April 1948, as part of Operation Hametz, to remove the threat of sniper fire to the Jewish neighbourhoods of Hatikvah, Ezra and Yad Eliyahu. The villagers were expelled and Jewish immigrants were settled there, among them Yemenite families who arrived as part of Operation Magic Carpet and families who had been made homeless during the war. Renamed Kfar Shalem, it became part of a densely populated neighbourhood of Tel Aviv, with some 20,000 residents.

In the 1960s, the area was slated for urban renewal. In 1965, the residents were served with eviction notices. Opposition to this move led to protests that sometimes turned violent. In December 1982, Shimon Yehoshua was shot to death by a policeman when trying to prevent the demolition of his home. At the beginning of the 1990s, hundreds of families were evacuated, receiving generous compensation.

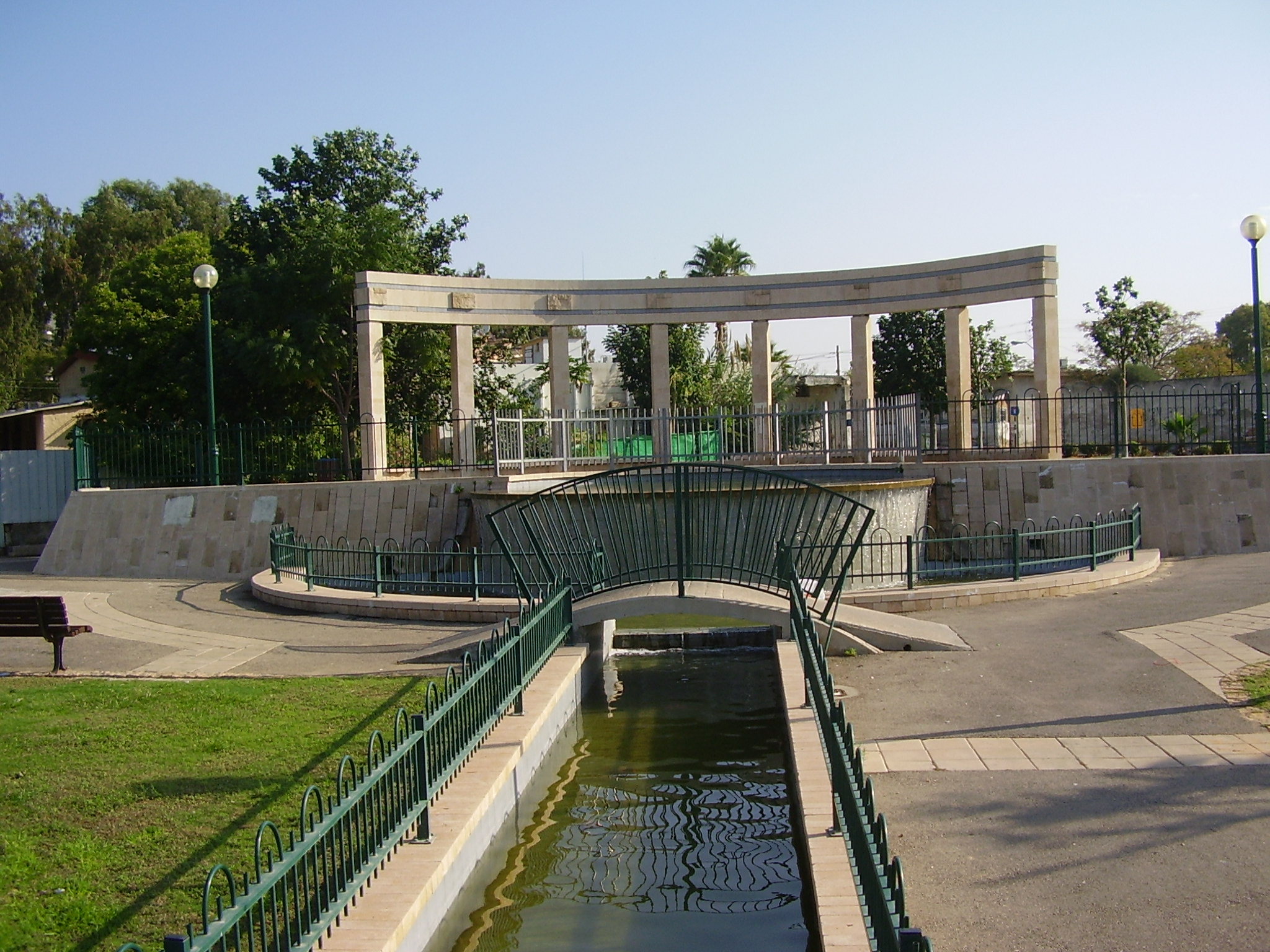
Kfar Shalem park

Evacuation orders were issued against 30 families on the grounds that their homes are built on private land owned in 1948 by a British investor that were not expropriated by the state. The Supreme Court accepted this argument, and the forced evacuation was carried out in mid-July 2007. Activists and community groups criticised this ruling, describing it as “ethnic-class injustice”.

In 2019, the Parent-Child Center opened in Kfar Shalem, offering programs and workshops for local children and their parents.

== Sport ==
The neighbourhood has a football team, Hapoel Kfar Shalem, which plays in Liga Leumit, the second-tier league.

== Notable people ==
- Shai Keinan – politician

== See also ==
- Neighbourhoods of Tel Aviv
