= Holon Institute of Technology =

Academic college in Israel

- מכון טכנולוגי חולון
- Former names: Center for Technological Education Holon (CTEH); Holon Academic Institute of Technology (HAIT)
- Motto: Quality and Excellence
- Type: Public college
- Established: 1969
- Academic affiliations: New York Institute of Technology
- Chairman: Cohen Pinchas
- President: Eduard Yakubov
- General Manager: Samuel Goldberg
- Students: 4,382 (2018-2019)
- Location: Holon, Israel; 32°0′51.56″N 34°46′25.75″E
- Colors
- Website: https://www.hit.ac.il/en/

Holon Institute of Technology (HIT) is an Israeli independent public college offering programs of Bachelor's degree and several Master's degree programs. It conducts research in the fields of science, applied mathematics, engineering, digital medical technologies, instructional technologies, industrial engineering/technology management, and design.

It is funded by Israel's Council for Higher Education.

== History ==
The college began in 1969 as the Center for Technological Education Holon The institute was founded to train engineers and began with 120 students.

In 2002 it was recognized by the Council for Higher Education as an independent academic institution of higher education called the Holon Academic Institute of Technology (HAIT), and in 2006, it was rebranded as HIT - Holon Institute of Technology.

In December 2011, HIT was granted authorization to confer the rank of associate professor in five different disciplines, on the condition that there were at least five professors in the specific field of the candidate for professorship.

In 2018, the New York Institute of Technology and Holon Institute of Technology partnered via a memorandum of understanding (MoU) on students and faculty initiatives in a variety of areas.

== Faculties and departments ==
- Faculty of Electrical & Electronic Engineering – HIT's first Faculty, established in 2001: B.Sc. and M.Sc. degrees (both with and without a thesis)
- Faculty of Industrial Engineering & Technology Management – Established in 2004, offering B.Sc. and M.Sc. degrees (without thesis)
- Faculty of Design – Established in 2007, offering B.Design in Industrial Design, Interior Design, and Visual Communication Design + M.Design degree in Design for Technological Environments.
- Faculty of Instructional Technologies – Established in 2007, offering B.A. & M.A. degrees (without thesis).
- Faculty of Science – Established in 2006, offering B.Sc. in Applied Mathematics, B.Sc. and M.Sc. (with/without a thesis) in Computer Science, Physics providing courses for other Faculties.
- Department of Digital Medical Technologies – Established in 2020.
- Department of Data Science – Established in 2022; offering M.Sc. degrees in three specializations: Data Science for Health Systems and Medical Technologies, Intelligent Systems, Business, and Industrial Intelligence.
- School (formerly Department) of Multidisciplinary Studies – Established in 2021.

== Undergraduate programs ==
HIT offers nine undergraduate programs:

- B.Sc. in Electrical & Electronics Engineering
- B.Sc. in Computer Science
- B.Design in Industrial Design
- B.Design in Interior Design
- B.Design in Visual Communication Design
- B.Sc. in Applied Mathematics
- B.Sc. in Industrial Engineering & Technology Management
- B.A. in Instructional Technologies
- B.Sc. in Digital Medical Technologies

== Master's programs ==
HIT offers six programs for master's degrees (with or without a thesis):

- M.Sc. in Computer Science
- M.Sc. in Electrical & Electronics Engineering
- M.Sc. in Technology Management
- M.A. in Instructional Technologies
- M.Sc. in Data Science
- M.Design in Design for Technological Environments

== The campus ==
The HIT campus covers an area of about 12 acres at the center of the city of Holon and includes eight buildings (23,000 square meters). Future development plans include the construction of additional buildings, up to a total floor area of 90,000 square meters.

== See also ==
- Education in Israel
- List of universities and colleges in Israel
