= Andreas Heinecke =

German disability rights activist (b. 1955)

- Born: 24 December 1955 (age 70)
- Occupations: Social entrepreneur & Academic
- Known for: Dialogue in the Dark; Dialogue with Time; Dialogue in Silence; Social entrepreneurship; Ashoka fellow

Andreas Heinecke (born 24 December 1955) is a social entrepreneur and the creator of Dialogue in the Dark. He is the first Ashoka Fellow for Western Europe and a Schwab Foundation for Social Entrepreneurship Global Fellow. He is also the founder of Dialogue Social Enterprise and an honorary professor and Chair of Social Business at the EBS University of Business and Law, Wiesbaden, Germany.

== Career ==
Heinecke worked as a journalist and documentalist at a southwestern German radio station in the 1970s and 1980s. He later became an active Osher Fellow of the Exploratorium, a science and technology museum in San Francisco, from February to March 2019.

== Social entrepreneurship ==
In 1988, Heinecke became deputy director of the Foundation for the Blind in Frankfurt, where he launched Dialogue in the Dark that same year. Since then, Dialogue in the Dark exhibitions and business workshops have been hosted worldwide and are established independently through a social franchise system.

Heinecke directed Dialogue in Silence in 1997, which was intended as a complementary experience to Dialogue in the Dark. Accompanied by hearing-impaired guides and trainers, participants are given noise-cancelling headphones and encouraged to explore various forms of non-verbal communication.

In 2009, Heinecke and 3 others founded Dialogue Social Enterprise GmbH. One of its three current programs is Dialogue with Time, with guides aged 70 or above. He and his wife Orna Cohen developed the interactive exhibition, which opened in Israel August 2012.

== Awards ==
- Stevie Wonder Vision Award in New York (1998)
- Best Practice in Universal Design in Tokyo (2004)
- First Ashoka Fellow in Western Europe (2005)
- Deutscher Unternehmerpreis (Category Sustainable Entrepreneurship) (2006)
- Outstanding Global Social Entrepreneur by the Schwab Foundation, Geneva (2007)
- Member of the World Economic Forum's Global Agenda Council on Social Entrepreneurship (2008)
- Global Award Winner for the best Innovative and out-of-comfort-zone event by the YPO (2009)
- Dragon Award for the category “Business with Conscience”, Dalian (2009)
- Deutscher Gründerpreis in Berlin (2011)
- ESSL Foundation (2012)
- Mariano Gago Ecsite Sustainable Success Award (2017)

== Selected publications ==
- Heinecke, Andreas (1990): Das Ostjudentum im Werk von José Orabuena. Frankfurt am Main: Lang (Europäische Hochschulschriften Reihe 1, 1182)
- Heinecke, Andreas (2007): Public-Private-Partnership, öffentlicher Dienst und soziales Unternehmertum. Chancen und Risiken. In: Achleitner, Ann-Kristin (Ed.): Finanzierung von Sozialunternehmern. Konzepte zur finanziellen Unterstützung von Social Entrepreneurs. Stuttgart: Schäffer-Poeschel (Handelsblatt-Bücher), pp. 160–167
- Heinecke, Andreas (2008): Jenseits der Dinge. Zur Gegenständlichkeit des Immateriellen. In: Deutsche Arbeitsschutzausstellung; Bundesanstalt für Arbeitsschutz und Arbeitsmedizin (Ed.): Szenografie in Ausstellungen und Museen. Essen: Klartext, pp. 18–27
- Heinecke, Andreas (2009): Dialogue in the Dark. In: Earl Steele, Philip; Obem, Anna; Starzyńska, Dorota (Ed./Ashoka Publication): Creating Change. Innovations in the World of Disability. Warschau, Friends of Integration Association, pp. 46–51,
- Heinecke, Andreas (2009): Dialog im Dunkeln – Ausstellungen als soziale Unternehmen. In: Rousseau, Manuela und Reifurth, Katharina: Fundraising- Management, Methoden und Instrumente. KMM Hamburg. Institut für Kultur- und Medienmanagement p. 252-262
- Co-author and led by Heinecke (2011): The Social Investment Manual A Guide for Social Entrepreneurs
- Co-author and led by Heinecke (2012): Governance of Social Enterprises A guidebook to corporate governance of social enterprises
- Heinecke, A., (2012), Why Can You Not Do Good and Earn Well? Social Entrepreneurs Caught in a Moral Conflict, in Corporate Governance in the New Normal, SID Conference Paper
- Heinecke, A. & Mayer, J. (2012), Strategies for Scaling in Social Entrepreneurship, in: Social Entrepreneurship and Social Business, Volkmann C., Tokarski K.O., Ernst, K. (Editors), 191-209
