= Holon Children's Museum =

Children's museum in Holon, Israel

Coordinates: 32°0′11″N 34°47′52″E

- מוזיאון הילדים חולון
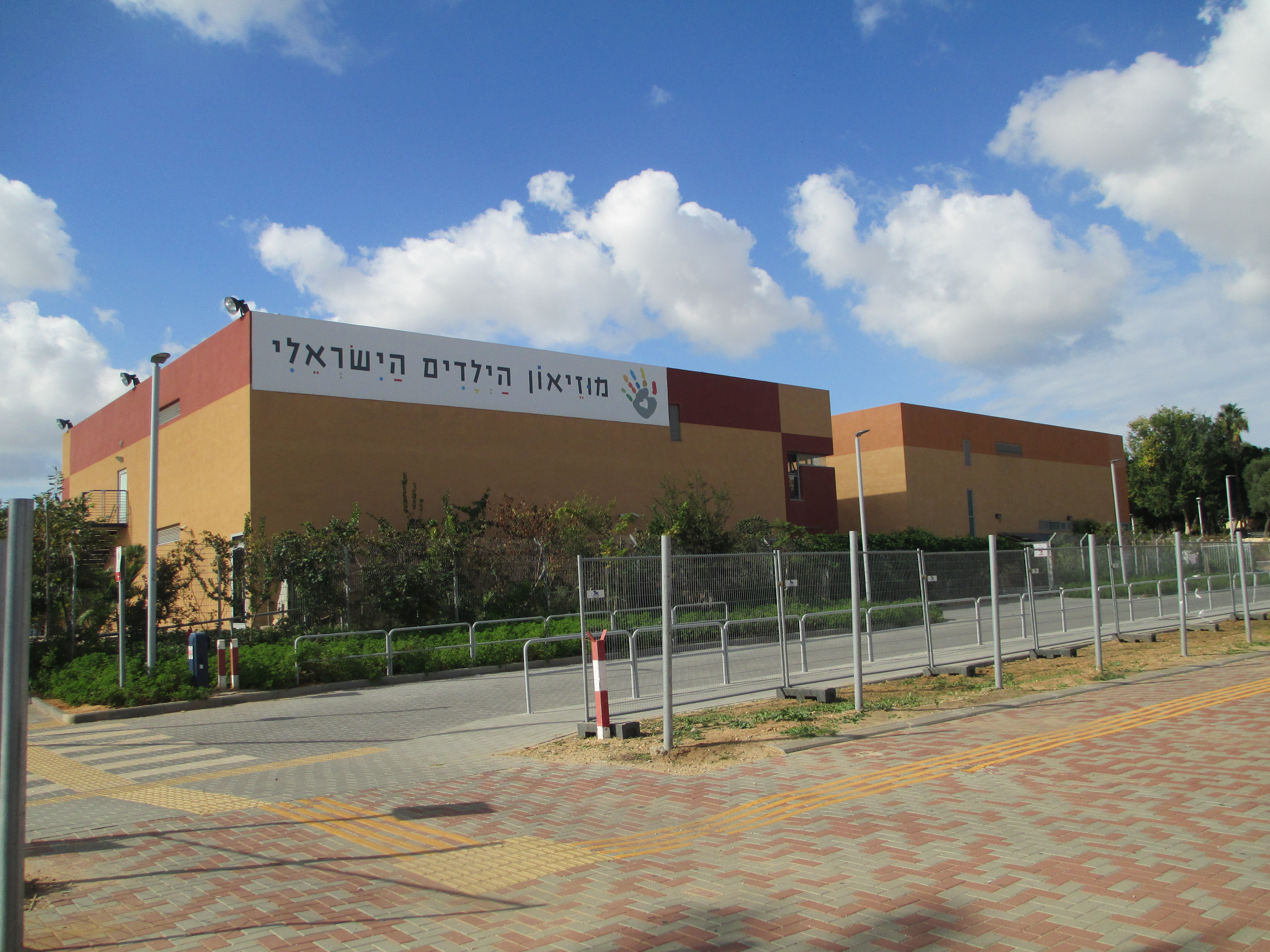
- Holon Children's Museum
- Location: Holon, Israel
- Type: Children's museum

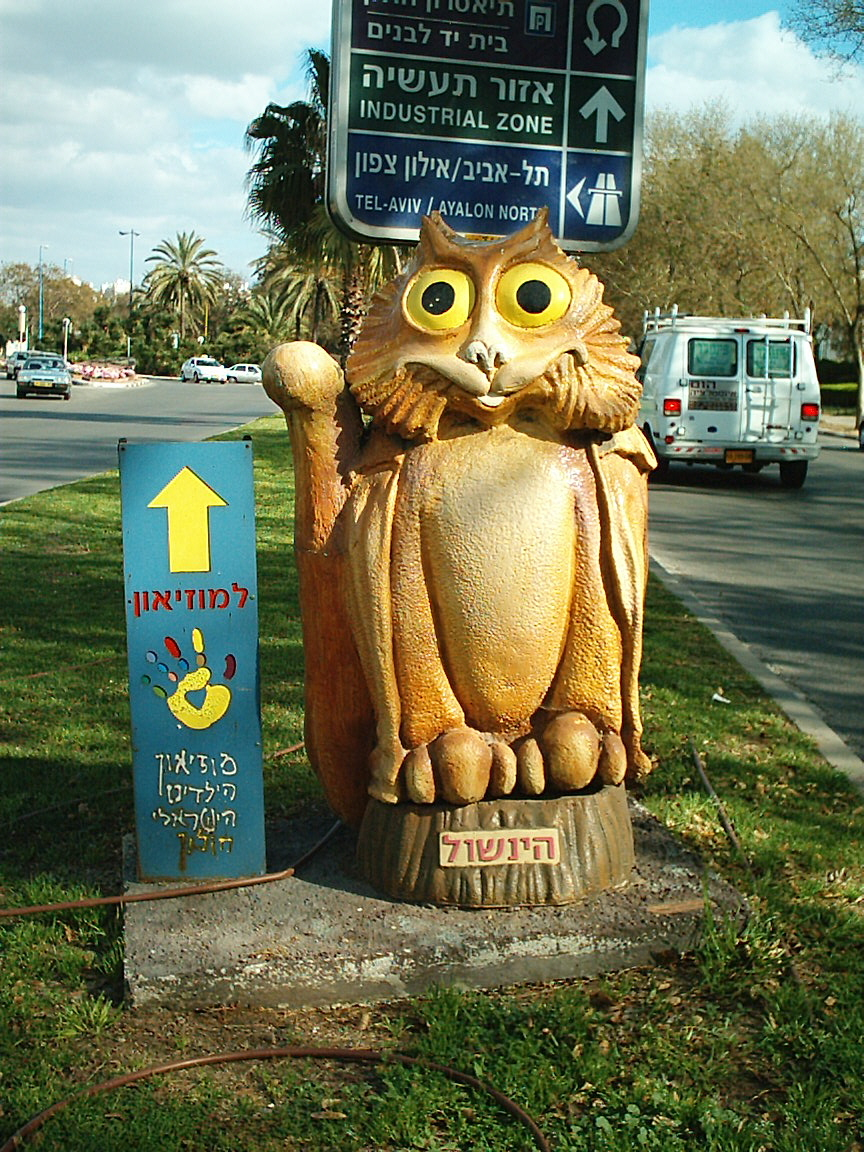
Yanshul, symbol of the Holon Children's Museum

Holon Children's Museum (Hebrew: מוזיאון הילדים חולון) is a children's museum in Holon, Israel.

== History ==
Special exhibits include "Dialogue in The Dark" led by a sight-impaired guide, and "Invitation To Silence," an inter-active exhibition exploring communication led by deaf guides.
