= Rafi Saar =

Mayor of Kfar Saba

- רפי סער
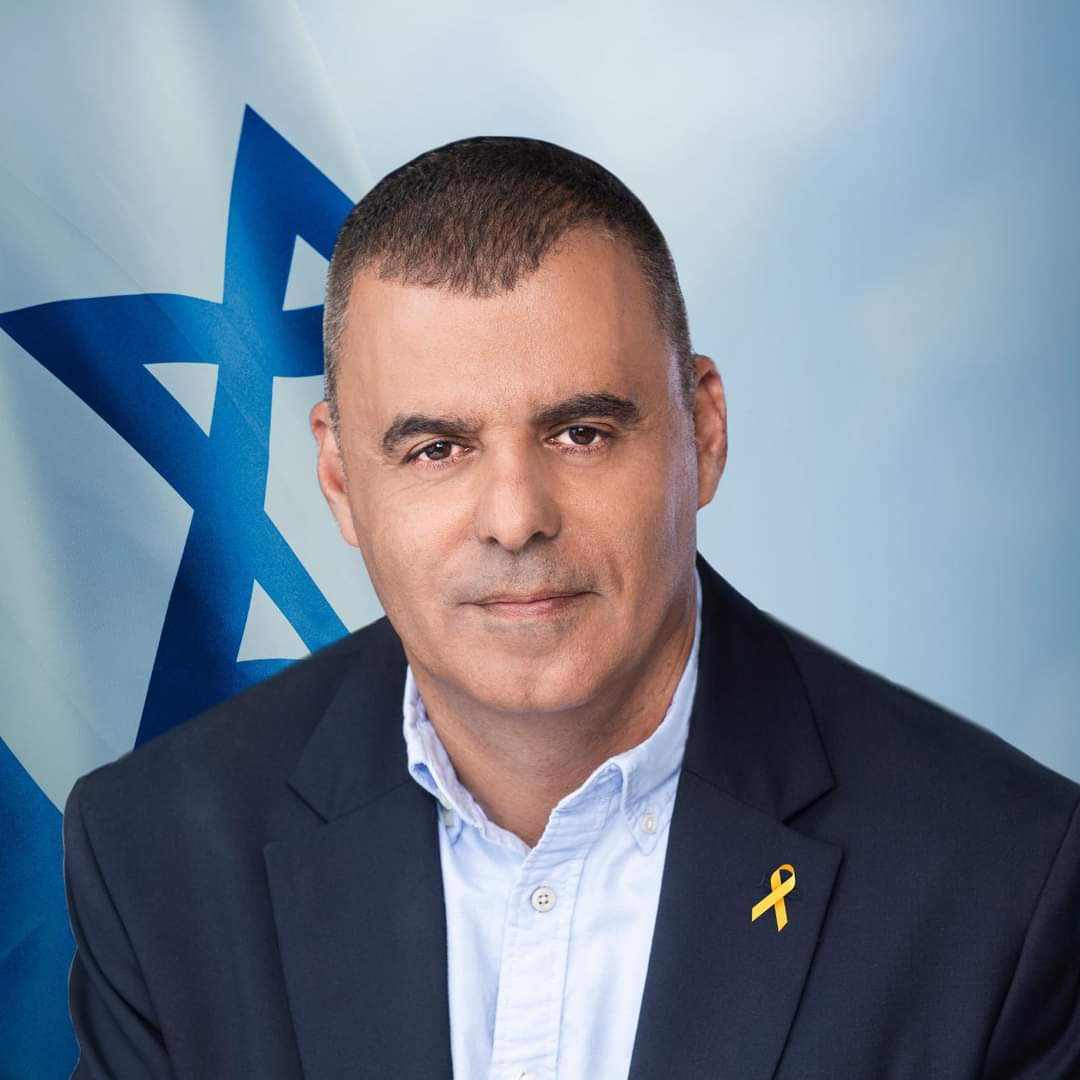
- Rafi Saar, 2023

Mayor of Kfar Saba
- Incumbent
- Assumed office 4 December 2018
- Preceded by: Yehuda Ben Hamo

Personal details
- Born: 25 September 1967 (age 59) Kfar Saba, Israel
- Party: Derech Hadasha

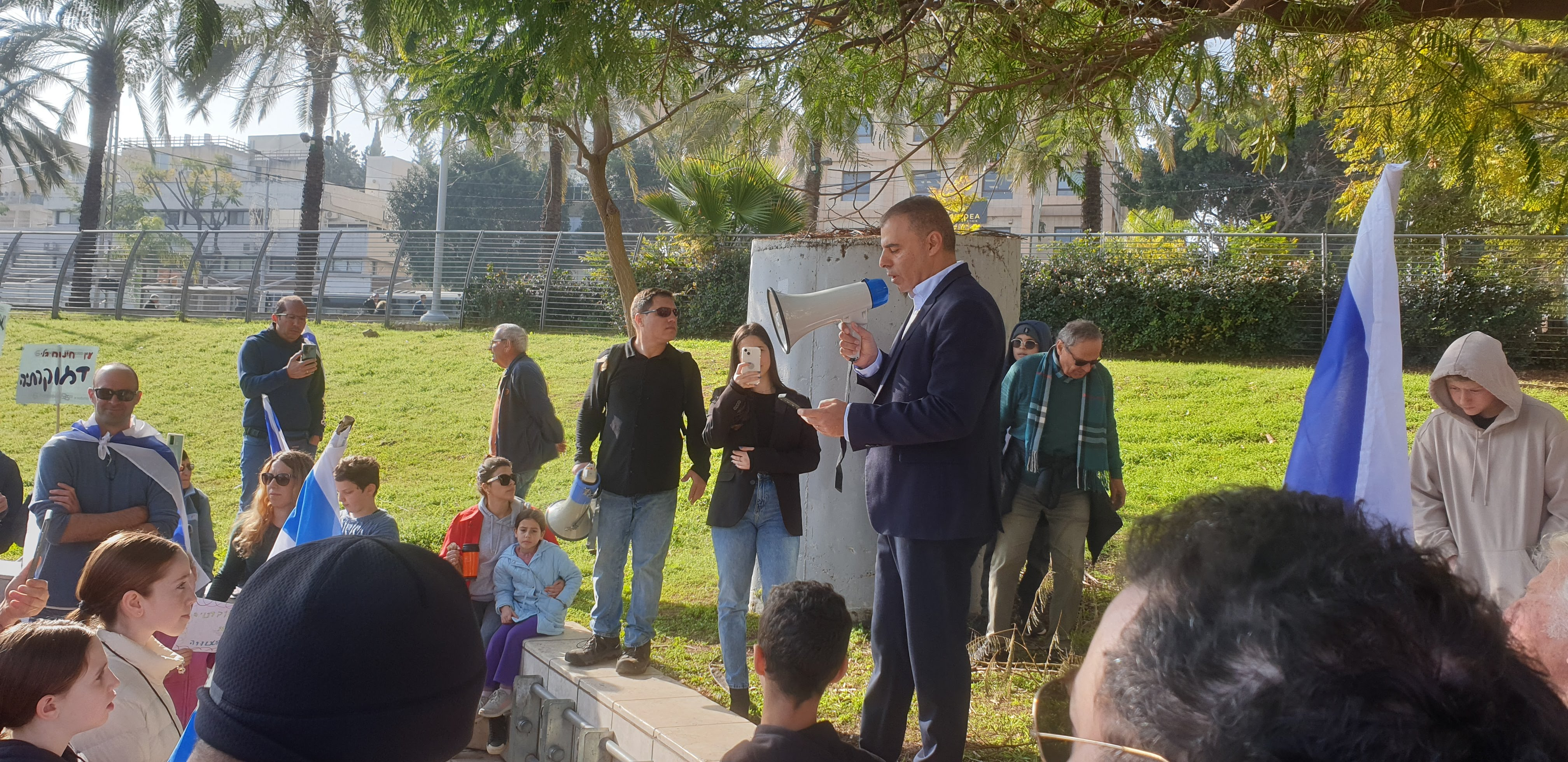
Mayor of Kfar Saba, Rafi Saar, at a demonstration in Kfar Saba as part of the 2023 Israeli anti-judicial reform protests, February 20, 2023.

Rafi Saar (Hebrew: רפי סער; born 25 September 1967) is the current mayor of Kfar Saba.

== Background ==
Rafi Saar was born in and grew up in Kfar Saba. From 1982-1985, he attended the "Katznelson" high school in the city.

In the army, Saar served in the Engineering Corps and later studied at Bar-Ilan University from which he received bachelor degrees in political science and sociology and a Master's degree in business management.

== Career ==
Saar served as aide to former Kfar Saba mayor Itzhak Vald and later became General Manager of Kfar Saba Municipality.

In 2008, he ran for head of regional council for Kochav Yair-Tzur Yigal but lost. He served as council member on the opposition.

From 2009-2014, Saar served as General Manager of the municipality of Hod HaSharon.

== Mayor of Kfar Saba ==
On October 30, 2018 he ran for mayor of Kfar Saba in the first round against Yossi Sedbon, Zvika Zarfati, Ilai Harsgor Hendin, Hadar Lavi, Yuval Levi and Mirit Shaked Barak and advanced to the second round. On the 13th of November 2018, Saar won the election with 53.2% of the vote against Yossi Sedbon's 46.8%.

In the 2024 elections, he ran for another term and received 46.89% of the votes, with a gap of 757 votes from Hadar Lavi, and was elected to continue serving as head of the Kfar Saba municipality for five more years. For the city council, his list received 3 seats.

On October 12, 2026, it was reported that Saar, his wife, the CEO of an economic corporation, and 21 other individuals had been arrested by the police on suspicion of involvement in a corruption scandal. The allegations against Saar include bribery, conspiracy to commit a crime, money laundering offenses, extortion, obstruction of justice, and obtaining a benefit by fraud. Following his arrest, Saar suspended himself from his position and announced that his deputy would fill his role.
