= Party lists for the 2015 Israeli legislative election =

The 2015 Israeli legislative election was held using closed list proportional representation. Each party presented a list of candidates to the Central Elections Committee by 29 January 2015.

== Jewish Home ==
Jewish Home is led by Naftali Bennett.

1. Naftali Bennett
2. Uri Ariel
3. Ayelet Shaked
4. Eli Ben-Dahan
5. Nissan Slomiansky
6. Yinon Magal
7. Moti Yogev
8. Bezalel Smotrich
9. Shuli Mualem
10. Avi Wortzman
11. Nir Orbach
12. Avichai Rontzki
13. Orit Strook
14. Anat Roth
15. Ronen Shoval
16. Avihai Boaron
17. Nahi Eyal
18. Moshe Solomon
19. Yehudit Shilat
20. Sarah Eliash
21. Asher Cohen (Political sanities)
22. Shimon Meir Raklin
23. Yitzhak Amitai Cohen
24. Nehemia Rapel
25. Ant Haskiyeh
26. Yossi Fox
27. Ze'ev Schwartz
28. Yitzhak Zargari
29. Moshe Doron Danino
30. Yigal Dilmoni
31. Hana Rena Luz
32. Avraham Azoulay
33. Uri Bank
34. Hamutal Shapira
35. Roni Hasson
36. Hagit Gibor
37. Amram Ben-David
38. Raz Kil
39. Shimon Or
40. Yael Saad
41. Haim Michaelis
42. Moshe Goldstein
43. Ortal Cohen
44. Shai Blumenthal
45. Yaakov Soler
46. Shalom Almagor
47. Michal Waldiger
48. Eliyahu Mazuz
49. Alon Yunian
50. Yosef Haim Harush
51. Jeremy Salten
52. Smadar Haya Meyuhas
53. Uri Yehuda Shahor
54. Gasov Hasson
55. Reuven Gur Aryeh Ha'ovenstock
56. Amichai Yehoshua Langfeld
57. Yelena Leah Marost
58. Zvi Weiss
59. Tuvia Bruckner
60. Adi Pelach
61. Sommer Sharon Teich
62. David Hayun
63. Yosef Magnagi
64. Itay Aharoni
65. Aviad Bar Hai
66. Noa Afriat
67. Ya'ara Yeshurun
68. Esther Yaakov
69. Yeshayahu Bashan Bukshpan
70. Dvir Hudifi
71. Shmuel Levi
72. Natalie Akdam
73. Shmuel Meirovitz
74. Rotem Yanai
75. Yaron Harel
76. Shlomit Vlach
77. Yossi Vaknin
78. Yosef Franco
79. Yael Ron
80. Noam Zechariah Sherman
81. Naama Pasia Tal
82. Avraham Soliman
83. Elyashiv HaCohen
84. Gadi Yitzhak Gedalyahu Malka
85. Rina Cohen
86. Elisha Hovav
87. Oded Yehuda Sushard
88. Shalom Shtimler
89. Avraham Moshe Buma Bar-Chad
90. Sharon Ruas
91. Moshe Cohen
92. Rotem Kakon
93. Ofir Shimon Tuil
94. Avichai Tabak
95. Michal Shulamit Calderon
96. Itay Grank
97. Paz Shmuel Glickman
98. Michael Boaz Siman Tov
99. Guy David Marciano
100. Segev Ilanit Ginsburg
101. Noam Weiss
102. Avinoam Goelman
103. Doron Yitzhak Beinehorn
104. Yechiel Meir Wasserman
105. Noa Nechama Raviv
106. Ben-Zion Gedalyahu Arbiv
107. Shai Nathan
108. Haim Drukman

== Joint List ==
Joint List is led by Ayman Odeh.

1. Ayman Odeh
2. Masud Ghnaim
3. Jamal Zahalka
4. Ahmad Tibi
5. Aida Touma-Suleiman
6. Abd al-Hakim Hajj Yahya
7. Haneen Zoabi
8. Dov Khenin
9. Taleb Abu Arar
10. Yousef Jabareen
11. Basel Ghattas
12. Osama Saadi
13. Abdullah Abu Ma'aruf
14. Juma Azbarga
15. Said al-Harumi
16. Ibrahim Hijazi
17. Youssef Atauna
18. Wael Younis
19. Nivin Abu Rachmon
20. Leah Tzemel-Warszawski
21. Noa Levi
22. Samer Samara

== Kulanu ==
Kulanu is led by Moshe Kahlon.

1. Moshe Kahlon
2. Yoav Gallant
3. Eli Alaluf
4. Michael Oren
5. Rachel Azaria
6. Tali Ploskov
7. Yifat Shasha-Biton
8. Eli Cohen
9. Roy Folkman
10. Meirav Ben-Ari
11. Shai Babad
12. Akram Hasson
13. Tomer Uzan
14. Asher Pantehon Siyum
15. Rivka Werclevsky Belistra
16. Elias Sliman
17. Shilat Khakshur
18. Naama Tova Harel
19. Ariel Almog
20. Dalit Harel
21. Eran Elias
22. Yair Yaish Yochai Biton
23. David Etzioni
24. Moshe Shai Ben David
25. Rotem Kakon
26. Tal Pe'er Inbal
27. Guy Noam
28. Tzafi Feiga Ehrlich
29. Orit Agami
30. Zohar Sosenko
31. Nirit Ibi
32. Ran Moshe
33. Shalom Sa'ar

== Likud ==
Likud is led by Benjamin Netanyahu.

1. Benjamin Netanyahu
2. Gilad Erdan
3. Yuli Edelstein
4. Israel Katz
5. Miri Regev
6. Silvan Shalom
7. Moshe Ya'alon
8. Ze'ev Elkin
9. Danny Danon
10. Yariv Levin
11. Benny Begin
12. Tzachi Hanegbi
13. Yuval Steinitz
14. Gila Gamliel
15. Ofir Akunis
16. David Bitan (Note: Slot reserved for candidate from the Shfela region)
17. Haim Katz
18. Jackie Levy (Note: Slot reserved for candidate from the Galilee region)
19. Yoav Kish (Note: Slot reserved for candidate from the greater Tel Aviv area)
20. Tzipi Hotovely
21. Dudu Amsalem (Note: Slot reserved for candidate from the Jerusalem area)
22. Miki Zohar (Note: Slot reserved for candidate from the Negev region)
23. Anat Berko
24. Ayoob Kara
25. Nava Boker
26. Avi Dichter
27. Avraham Neguise (Note: Slot reserved for an immigrant)
28. Nurit Koren
29. Yaron Mazuz
30. Oren Hazan
31. Sharren Haskel
32. Amir Ohana
33. Yehuda Glick
34. Osnat Mark
35. Ziv Agmon
36. Pinhas Idan
37. Michael Ratzon
38. Shevah Stern
39. Amir Yigal Sternberg-Weitman
40. Fateen Mulla
41. Aylat Galili
42. Naftaly Naor
43. Hasan Hayb
44. Ayala Shtegman
45. Aryeh Netanel Lipo
46. Natan Shimon Sarel
47. Jacky Pinto
48. Silva Mizrahi
49. Gil Haddad
50. Roni Stern
51. Gadi Gedalya Bashari
52. Tali Talia Argaman
53. Yair Davidi
54. Ariel Buchnik
55. Michel Buskila
56. Gavriel Kadosh
57. Shimon Shitrit
58. Kfir Elad Zamir
59. Herve Maimon
60. Haim Ze'ev Friedrich
61. Tzadok Cohen
62. Maimon Toledano
63. Yehezkel Eini
64. Silas Eliezer
65. Sinai Shaul Kehat
66. Yitzhak Dikstein
67. Rafael Katashvili
68. Rafael Zanzuri
69. Zion Pinian
70. Lior Haimovich
71. Michael Lubovikov
72. Netanel Shlomo Avneri
73. Itamar Sonino
74. Ido Elimelech Carmel
75. Mordechai Avner
76. Yaron Nissim (Yahya)
77. David Elhayani
78. Yair Revivo
79. Binyamin Biton
80. Arnon Abramov
81. Eliezer Yehoshua Rodrigue
82. David Even Tzur
83. Moshe Albert
84. Yehezkel Yagna
85. Arnon Barzilay
86. Meir Nissim Dahan
87. Alon Moshe Siso
88. Khir Navwani
89. Gabriel Schwartz
90. Oz (Isaac) Alter
91. David Shmuel Haim
92. Yefet Tiri
93. Susan Ben-Abu
94. Natalia Yelinson
95. Shoshana Sabag
96. Meir Halabi
97. Tova Maoz
98. Rafael Peretz
99. Baruch Bruker
100. Hillel Aharman
101. Haim Zvi Lipkin
102. Dov Gilboa
103. Raudor Vardimon
104. Juliet Lasker
105. Yitzhak Chen
106. Hedva Spiegel
107. Haya Shamir
108. David Zvi
109. Shlomo Zweifler
110. Rafi Reuven Girgis
111. Aharon Botzer
112. Makhlouf Bankasus
113. Pascual-Oscar Frisher
114. Izzo Chaimovitz
115. Dalia Igler
116. Kochava Matityahu
117. Moshe Dolgin
118. Yehudit Band
119. Moshe Nissim

== Meretz ==
Meretz is led by Zehava Gal-On.

1. Zehava Gal-On
2. Ilan Gilon
3. Issawi Frej
4. Michal Rozin
5. Tamar Zandberg
6. Mossi Raz
7. Gaby Lasky
8. Avi Dabush
9. Avshalom Vilan
10. Uri Zaki
11. Revital Len Cohen
12. Nir Lahav
13. Itay Svirsky
14. Smadar Aharoni
15. Tom Dromi Hakim
16. Dalia Rachel Steiner
17. Imri Kalman
18. Tal Grinshpan
19. Ehud Bendel
20. Susan Amy Silverman
21. Michal Eden
22. Michael Gitzin
23. Ron Mahreta Baruch
24. Abd al-Karim Zuabi
25. Tomer Reznik
26. Ahmad Badir
27. Elias Matanes
28. Nimrod Barnea
29. Sigalit Sheinman
30. Idit Diamant
31. Meital Miriam Lahavi
32. Ilai Harsgor Handin
33. Esther Levanon Murdoch
34. Masha Litvak
35. Ronit Weintraub
36. Yosef "Pepe" Alalu
37. Shai Even
38. Abd al-Salam Hassan
39. Liat Timor
40. Ofer Zevner
41. Viviana Leah Wolfson
42. Meital Moalem
43. Devorah "Debbie" Slutzky
44. Suad Shahada
45. Adi Gisis Steinman
46. Noga Bar-Lev-Livneh
47. Laura Warton
48. Nathan Lam
49. Muhammad Khawaled
50. Saleh Salalha
51. Iris Kalka
52. Plia Katner
53. Morag Kati Piasecki
54. Roi Peled
55. Doron Liber
56. Shira Sagi
57. Sharon Orshalimi
58. Dror Mizrahi
59. Michal Shochat
60. Sarah Starkovski Shilon
61. Itay Leonard Zidenberg
62. Maya Ada Crabtree
63. Lior Finkel
64. Susan Linda Bachar
65. Morris Shahada
66. Idan Lamdan
67. Abd al-Halim Zoabi
68. Yifat Solel
69. Yael Leibnewirt Re'am
70. Lam'an Nash
71. Meir Margalit
72. Ruth Lapidot
73. Ahmad Mashharawi
74. Yitzhak Tzoizner
75. Tahsin Karash
76. Naomi Zion
77. Rakefet Zohar
78. Hagit Ofran
79. Moran Mazuz
80. Avirama Golan
81. Yona Shimon Bergur
82. Gershon Baskin
83. Rani Trainin
84. Tzur Shizef
85. Ze'ev Herzog
86. Avner de-Shalit
87. Ilan Baruch
88. Yosef Morciano
89. Daniel Filc
90. Aliza Zohar
91. Tzvia Bizawi
92. Galia Salvia
93. Hanna Herzog
94. Esther Zekheim-Graus
95. Ziva Sternhell
96. Giora Ram
97. Latif Dori
98. Raphael Walden
99. Tzvia Walden
100. Dror Morag-Ish Shalom
101. Alexander Libeck
102. Ruth Hedva Reznik
103. Yehudit Buber-Agassi
104. Nissim Calderon
105. Amira Sartani
106. Mordechai Bar-On
107. Tzali Reshef
108. Daniel Kron
109. Colette Avital
110. Dan Shavit
111. Yehoshua Sobol
112. Alice Shalvi
113. Hussein Fares
114. Ran Cohen
115. Yair Tzaban
116. Naomi Chazan
117. Anat Maor
118. Yossi Beilin
119. Haim Oron
120. Yossi Sarid

== Shas ==
Shas is led by Aryeh Deri.

1. Aryeh Deri
2. Yitzhak Cohen
3. Meshulam Nahari
4. Yaakov Margi
5. David Azoulay
6. Yoav Ben Tzur
7. Yitzhak Vaknin
8. Avraham Michaeli
9. Haim Biton
10. Yigal Guetta
11. Michael Malchieli
12. Rafi Baranes
13. Boaz David Bitton
14. Danny Saida
15. Avraham Amsalem
16. Yinon Azulai
17. Yehoshua Amar
18. Yosef Haim Moalem
19. Shalom Meir Azarzar
20. NetanelNahum
21. Avraham Bitton
22. Michael Michel Tapiro
23. Meir Ben Simon
24. Yussi Kakon
25. Avner Marcel Amar
26. Uriel Buso
27. Victor Krispel
28. Natan Elnatan
29. Ofer Kardi
30. Haim Eli Ruash
31. Haim Saverli
32. Eliyahu Zagdon
33. Kfir Ovadia
34. Uriel Malka
35. Yitzhak Malka
36. Eli Gabay
37. Eli Dadon
38. Yehuda Ubeidi
39. Nehorai Lahiani
40. Hagai Haddad
41. Binyamin Alharar
42. Menachem David
43. Ami Biton
44. Yaakov Admoni
45. Yehiel Vaknin
46. Salomon Ezran
47. Netanel Efraim Hayak
48. Tzur Cohen
49. Netanel Alfalas
50. Shlomo Suissa
51. Avraham Borochov
52. Yaakov Yisrael Tzadka
53. Shlomo Maman
54. Udi Telahun Zauda
55. Bezalel Ben Ezra
56. Nissim Avitan
57. Ofer Ohana
58. Dotan Avraham Idan Froilichman
59. Simon Elgarbali
60. Yigal Dror Haddad
61. Roni Ben Hamo
62. Maimon Ohayon
63. Nachmaniel Daniel Yosef Zvi Saban
64. Aharon Yaakov Cohen
65. Moshe Arbel
66. Erez Malul
67. Yehuda Hazan
68. Eliyahu Levi
69. Ofer Cohen
70. Netanel Amsalem
71. Yisrael Shneur
72. Yonatan Misharki
73. Moshe Yaakov Elhayani
74. Eliyahu Khoury
75. David Dayan
76. Avishai Edri
77. Yitzhak Elhanan Kabasa
78. Yehuda Amar
79. Shimon Swissa
80. Aharon Yaakobi
81. Yair Reuven Navon
82. David Hai Hazan
83. Yitzhak Engel
84. Menashe Levi
85. Haim Sabag
86. Moshe Cohen
87. Shlomo Levi
88. Shlomo Efraim Danino
89. Yosef Levi
90. Yitzhak Harush
91. Oren Bar Shalom
92. Moshe Cohen
93. Yisrael Meir Danan
94. Shalom Meir Kabasa
95. Ariel Agmon
96. Yaruel Yaakov
97. Shimon Okashi
98. Shimon Peretz
99. Yosef Menachem
100. Yosef Salton
101. Shimon Avitan
102. Dan Cohen
103. Avraham Partosh
104. Yaakov Ariel Cohen
105. Moshe Lavon
106. Shimon Ben Shlomo
107. Avi Ben Avraham
108. Chaim Ben Avraham
109. Eliyahu Kar'i
110. Yosef Okni
111. Bezalel Natan
112. Shlomo Shlomi Kakon
113. Dror Ben Efraim
114. Yaakov Ben Shlomo
115. Avdiel Dov Israeli
116. Oshri Azoulay
117. Yonatan Danino
118. Aviel Yochai Cohen
119. Avigad Ben Sa'adon
120. Ariel Atias

== United Torah Judaism ==
United Torah Judaism is led by Yaakov Litzman.

1. Yaakov Litzman
2. Moshe Gafni
3. Meir Porush
4. Uri Maklev
5. Eliezer Moses
6. Yisrael Eichler
7. Ya'akov Asher
8. Eliezer Sorotzkin
9. Shlomo Teitel
10. Shimon Haddad
11. Avraham Schwartz
12. Yitzchak Reich
13. Ya'akov Tessler
14. Aryeh Zvi Boymel
15. Menachem Klein
16. Eliyahu Mordechai Karlitz
17. Yitzchak Broida
18. Avraham Rubinstein
19. Aharon Yosef Daitsh
20. Yaakov Asher Guterman
21. Chaim Meir Katz
22. Yitzhak Pindrus
23. Hanoch Zeibert
24. Menachem Mendel Shapira
25. Pinchas Tzenwirt
26. Shlomo Menachem Vidislavski
27. Moshe David Morgenstern
28. Yaakov Vizbinski
29. Shlomo Yehuda Goldental
30. Menachem Eisenberger
31. David Ohana
32. Efraim Weber
33. Avraham Ben-Zion Deutsch
34. David Adler
35. Moshe Eliyahu Weinman
36. Yisrael Moshe Friedman
37. Yisrael Avraham Schachter
38. Shlomo Zelig Orlanski
39. Reuven Breisch
40. Yisrael Yitzchak Golomb
41. Shmuel Aryeh Leib Simon
42. Yisrael Reisner
43. Shmuel Shmelke Tirer
44. Pinchas Shalom Badush
45. Zvi Roshgold
46. Yehuda Yavrov
47. Chaim Shlomo Bernstein
48. Mordechai Ze'ev Blau
49. Yitzchak Rudik
50. Shimon Yisrael Kellerman
51. Moshe Oberlander
52. Shmuel Greenberg
53. Alter Ben Zion Klugman
54. Mordechai Goldberg
55. Gedalyahu Sheinin
56. Yitzhak Ravitz
57. Menachem Mendel Reichbard
58. Avraham Pinchas Stern
59. Chaim Meir Wiesel
60. Yosef Shaul Shitrit
61. David Hershtein
62. Simion Mushiashvili
63. Binyamin Ze'ev Hacker
64. Shmuel Grossbard
65. Yekutiel David Zaida
66. Mordechai Michael Alper
67. Mordechai Brisk
68. Eliyahu Baruchi
69. Israel Leizer
70. Pinchas David Siroka
71. Shlomo Zecharya Kostlitz
72. Eliezer Zvi Rauchberger
73. Ezra Avraham Green
74. Binyamin Moshe Mordechai Montag
75. Yehuda Aryeh Rosen
76. Yitzhak Dov Brenner
77. Peretz Abramovitz
78. Eliyahu Yosef Brunner
79. Mordechai Shmuel Gartenhaus
80. Yaakov Kurtzki
81. Yisrael Ze'ev Meir,
82. Uri Meir Yaffe
83. Chaim Baruch Vikhleder
84. Yaakov Wallenstein,
85. Yekutiel Zalman Neumann
86. Shlomo Stern
87. Chanoch-David Zeidman
88. Shlomo Huminer
89. Akiva Ovitz
90. Avraham Yaakov Weiss
91. Avraham Alexander Bresler
92. Binyamin Tuvia Lowenstein
93. Avraham Mordechai Yosef Vakshtok
94. Yehuda Aryeh Pollak
95. Shimon Goldberg
96. Elad Tzadikov
97. Yaakov Chaim Zorger
98. Avinoam Shifman
99. Yisrael Mordechai Goldberg
100. Yisrael Mordechai Silverstein
101. Mordechai Lieberman
102. Natan Weiss
103. Shmuel Krivos
104. Efraim Weiss
105. Elchanan Arntreuy
106. Yehuda Reich
107. Naftali Yosef Virnik
108. Yonah Mushkovitz
109. Pinchas Gross
110. Moshe Mann
111. Menachem Klugman
112. Moshe Frank
113. Zamir Netanel Maimon
114. Avraham Yitzchak Mishkovsky
115. Shabtai Shinfeld
116. Avraham Aharon Rosenthal
117. Shlomo Deutsch
118. Moshe Shalom Karp
119. Meir Yitzchak

== Yachad–Otzma Yehudit ==
Yachad–Otzma Yehudit is led by Eli Yishai.

1. Eli Yishai
2. Yoni Chetboun
3. Michael Ayash
4. Baruch Marzel (Note: Slot reserved for a member of Otzma Yehudit)
5. Sason Treblesi
6. Amital Bar-Eli
7. Dudi Shwamenfeld
8. Ya'akov Yakir
9. Brosh Eilon
10. Reuven Yitzhak
11. Gabriel Rahamim
12. Yaniv Yosef Benita
13. Yosef Ben Shoshan
14. Yaakov Muati
15. Yitzhak Zuzut
16. Yehuda Balulu
17. Gabriel Uriel Leviatan Mazuz
18. Ezra Menachem Halleluyah
19. Yitzhak David Friedman
20. Elchai Tal
21. Michael Rahamim
22. Almog David
23. Avishai Cohen
24. Itamar Siani
25. Matatia Biton
26. Yitzhak Yosef Wiski

== Yesh Atid ==
Yesh Atid is led by Yair Lapid.

1. Yair Lapid
2. Shai Piron
3. Yael German
4. Meir Cohen
5. Yaakov Peri
6. Ofer Shelah
7. Haim Yellin
8. Yoel Razvozov
9. Karin Elharar
10. Aliza Lavie
11. Mickey Levy
12. Elazar Stern
13. Pnina Tamano-Shata
14. Boaz Toporovsky
15. Ruth Calderon
16. Yifat Kariv
17. Dov Lipman
18. Ronen Hoffman
19. Zehorit Shorek
20. Ofra Finkelstein
21. Hedva Shaked
22. Salim Kadoor
23. Gadi Mairi
24. Rachelia Shapiro
25. Vladimir Beliak
26. Sivan Bar-Or
27. Gilad Sharir
28. Shai Abuchatzira
29. Erez Aharoni
30. Yorai Lahav-Hertzanu
31. Itay Matatia
32. Uri Naftali-Oz
33. Zohar Zigberd Blum
34. Larisa Stadler
35. Nissan Ben-Hamo
36. Rami Bajeh
37. Debbie Biton
38. Ronit Eranfreund-Cohen
39. Yaakov Kurtz
40. Shahar Mi-On,
41. Moran Fadlon
42. Yaron Levi
43. Adi Be'eri-Cohen
44. Anat Knafo
45. Yariv Karin
46. Naor Shiri
47. Omri Nahum
48. Yaara Yamit Hana Di-Segni
49. Abay Dajan
50. Daniel Alberto Reines
51. Sarit Handknopf
52. Uri Grinberger
53. Ben Wizel
54. Dror Molcho
55. Hanit Hana Diamant-Admoni
56. Yasmin Fridman
57. Aviva Julia Hartman
58. Carmela Garbiner
59. Ofra Riva Bell
60. Dorin Avraham
61. Tali Peret
62. Eitan Glick
63. Michael Makhlouf Ben-Yishai
64. Anita Rosenbaum
65. Einat Margalit Mizrahi
66. Ofir Shai Rubin
67. Efrat Ben Efraim
68. Liron Ben Tal
69. Juliet Shirel Kate
70. Hadar Aloni
71. Michael Millis
72. Zohar Goili
73. Adi Barmucha
74. Roi Konkol
75. Tel Aviv Li Vidrich
76. Sharona Hershko
77. Meir Eliel
78. Weiss Dafna Gazit
79. Nathan Avrahami
80. Azriel Charizi
81. Sapir Librovsky
82. Yoel Rivlis
83. Maayan Gluzberg
84. Tal Taasa
85. Gideon Goren Graziani
86. Amram Lador
87. Noy Elrai
88. Orly Ben Zvi-Kubrinsk
89. Eyal Haushner
90. Shmuel Ben-Naftali
91. Coral Esther Wexler
92. Ayelet Segal
93. Yitzhak Peretz
94. Omri Peled
95. Yitzhak Farkash
96. Ronit Ben Yehuda
97. Aviad Cohen
98. Matan Moshe Schwartz
99. Dvora Weinstein
100. Yaron Sela
101. Robert Marius Rizel
102. Liat Tamir
103. Shai Harpaz
104. Michael Kabasa
105. Yohanan Harel
106. Yifat Morovitz
107. Reuven Ruby Eli Leon
108. Or Sadeh
109. Daniela Ben Shoshan
110. Ran Bleicher
111. Mirit Krugliak
112. Hila Biton
113. Tamar Bar Meir
114. Rachel Dolev
115. Sharon-Sarit Mark
116. Efrat Hachmon
117. Uri Shapira
118. Shilo Ashri
119. Miriam Melamed
120. Roni Somek

== Yisrael Beiteinu ==
Yisrael Beiteinu is led by Avigdor Lieberman.

1. Avigdor Lieberman
2. Orly Levi-Abekasis
3. Sofa Landver
4. Ilan Shohat
5. Sharon Gal
6. Hamad Amar
7. Robert Ilatov
8. Oded Forer
9. Yulia Malinovsky
10. Alex Miller
11. Shimon Ohayon
12. Leon Litinetski
13. Arkadi Pomerantz
14. Shimon Ohayon
15. Shadi Halul
16. Moshe "Motz" Matalon
17. Alexander Kushnir
18. Marina Koritni
19. Amir Schneider
20. Ashley Perry
21. Adam Emilov
22. David Ben Avraham
23. Michael Kalvo
24. Gaston Ariel Seidman
25. Yinon Katz
26. Kelly Belkar
27. Yahya Hib
28. Anton Mashrikov
29. Shahar Alon
30. Yory Goldstein

== Zionist Union ==
Zionist Union is led by Isaac Herzog.

1. Isaac Herzog
2. Tzipi Livni
3. Shelly Yachimovich
4. Stav Shaffir
5. Itzik Shmuli
6. Omer Bar-Lev
7. Yehiel Bar
8. Amir Peretz
9. Merav Michaeli
10. Eitan Cabel
11. Manuel Trajtenberg
12. Erel Margalit
13. Mickey Rosenthal
14. Revital Swid
15. Danny Atar
16. Yoel Hasson
17. Zouheir Bahloul
18. Eitan Broshi
19. Michal Biran
20. Nachman Shai
21. Ksenia Svetlova
22. Ayelet Nahmias-Verbin
23. Yossi Yona
24. Eyal Ben-Reuven
25. Yael Cohen Paran
26. Saleh Saad
27. Leah Fadida
28. Robert Tibayev
29. Moshe Mizrahi
30. Eldad Yaniv
31. Asheret Bahira Berdugo
32. Gilad Kariv
33. Ariel Eitan Schwartz
34. Ellis Florentina Goldman
35. Alon Pilz
36. Shimon Brown
37. Chaya Cohen
38. Nazar Aalimi
39. Ibrahim Abu Sabih
40. Solomon Trudy
41. Lior Carmel
42. Lemuel Melamed
43. Mark "Marco" Serbia
44. Alon Giladi
45. Zahava Ailani
46. Simon Alfassi
47. Uri Keidar
48. Nikola Masad
49. Israel Ziv
50. Richard Peres
51. Sigal Moran
52. Adir Vishniya
53. Farhan Abu Riyashi
54. Yamin Suissa
55. Daniel Amnon
56. Zohar Neumark
57. Nir Shardatzki
58. Julius Madler
59. Naah Golani
60. Emanuel Shahaf
61. Boris Eisenberg
62. Shulamit Ashbol
63. Mihal Silberberg
64. Roberto Nathanson Goldstrum
65. Joseph Attia
66. Pathi Amara
67. Yehezkel Engler
68. Shalom Kotler
69. Almog Adonsky
70. Samuel Mizrahi
71. Ayal Ostrinski
72. Joseph Vanunu
73. Eliyahu Sadan
74. Amiram Strolob
75. Eli Eliyahu Oren
76. Mishel Halimi
77. Samuel Bezaleli
78. Shalom Moyal
79. Shulamit Shula Cohen
80. Daniel Azoulay
81. David Magen
82. Zion Adiri
83. Roei Ben-David
84. Ali Shivli
85. Moshe Pines Tomer
86. Debbie Zahavi Ben-Ami
87. Yitzchak Isaac Cholavski
88. Dan Bilker
89. Ibrahim Abu Ras
90. Israel Hirschhorn
91. Avraham Dagani
92. Orah Haham
93. David Arieli
94. Yael Miriam Sinai
95. Moshe Ben Atar
96. Tzvi Magen
97. Tal Yechezkel Elovitzi
98. Tamar Shahori
99. Ehud Sutzkever
100. Ilana Pinto
101. Doron Sapir
102. Isaac Yemini
103. Amnon Zach
104. Arik Hadad
105. Michael Mordechai Biton
106. Alon Natan Schuster
107. Shlomo Bohbot
108. Adi Eldar
109. Eli Amir
110. Shimon Shetreet
111. Ophir Pines-Paz
112. Ronen Cohen
113. Uzi Baram
114. Avraham Shochat
115. Shevach Weiss
116. David Libai
117. Moshe Shahal
118. Aharon Yadlin
119. Shlomo Hillel
120. Yitzhak Navon
