= List of members of the twentieth Knesset =

20th Knesset
| ← | 19th | 21th | → |

Overview
- Legislative body: Knesset
- Jurisdiction: Israel
- Meeting place: Knesset building
- Term: 31 March 2015 – 26 December 2018
- Election: 17 March 2015
- Government: 34th government

Knesset
- President: Reuven Rivlin
- Prime minister: Benjamin Netanyahu
- Speaker: Yuli Edelstein

The members of the 20th Knesset were elected on 17 March 2015 and sworn in on 31 March 2015.

== Members of the Knesset ==
| Alliance | Party | Name |
|---|---|---|
| Likud (30) | | Benjamin Netanyahu • Gilad Erdan • Yuli Edelstein • Israel Katz • Miri Regev • Ze'ev Elkin • Yariv Levin • Benny Begin • Tzachi Hanegbi • Yuval Steinitz • Gila Gamliel • Ofir Akunis • David Bitan • Haim Katz • Yoav Kish • Tzipi Hotovely • Dudi Amsalem • Miki Zohar • Anat Berko • Ayoob Kara • Nava Boker • Avi Dichter • Avraham Neguise • Nurit Koren • Yaron Mazuz • Oren Hazan • Sharren Haskel • Amir Ohana • Yehuda Glick • Osnat Mark |
| Zionist Union (24) | Labor (18) | Isaac Herzog • Shelly Yachimovich • Stav Shaffir • Itzik Shmuli • Omer Bar-Lev • Yehiel Bar • Merav Michaeli • Eitan Cabel • Mickey Rosenthal • Revital Swid • Zouheir Bahloul • Eitan Broshi • Michal Biran • Nachman Shai • Ayelet Nahmias-Verbin • Yossi Yona • Saleh Saad • Leah Fadida |
| Zionist Union (24) | Hatnua (5) | Tzipi Livni • Amir Peretz • Yoel Hasson • Ksenia Svetlova • Eyal Ben-Reuven |
| Zionist Union (24) | Green Party (1) | Yael Cohen Paran |
| Joint List (13) | Hadash (4) | Ayman Odeh • Aida Touma-Suleiman • Dov Khenin • Yousef Jabareen |
| Joint List (13) | Ra'am (4) | Masud Ghnaim • Abd al-Hakim Hajj Yahya • Taleb Abu Arar • Said al-Harumi |
| Joint List (13) | Balad (4) | Jamal Zahalka • Haneen Zoabi • Juma Azbarga • Niven Abu Rahmoun |
| Joint List (13) | Ta'al (1) | Ahmad Tibi |
| Yesh Atid (11) | | Yair Lapid • Yael German • Meir Cohen • Ofer Shelah • Haim Jelin • Yoel Razvozov • Karin Elharar • Aliza Lavie • Mickey Levy • Elazar Stern • Pnina Tamano-Shata |
| Kulanu (10) | | Eli Alaluf • Michael Oren • Rachel Azaria • Tali Ploskov • Yifat Shasha-Biton • Eli Cohen • Roy Folkman • Meirav Ben-Ari • Akram Hasson • Fentahun Seyoum |
| Shas (7) | | Ya'akov Margi • Yoav Ben Tzur • Yitzhak Vaknin • Michael Malchieli • Meshulam Nahari • Danny Saida • Yinon Azulai |
| United Torah Judaism (7) | Agudat Yisrael (3) | Yaakov Litzman • Eliezer Moses • Yisrael Eichler |
| United Torah Judaism (7) | Degel HaTorah (3) | Moshe Gafni • Uri Maklev • Ya'akov Asher |
| Yisrael Beiteinu (5) (Note: Orly Levy resigned from Yisrael Beiteinu on 19 May 2016, continuing to serve as an independent) | | Avigdor Lieberman • Sofa Landver • Hamad Amar • Robert Ilatov • Oded Forer |
| Jewish Home (5) (Note: Three MKs left the Jewish Home to establish the New Right in December 2018.) | | Uri Ariel • Eli Ben-Dahan • Nissan Slomiansky • Moti Yogev • Bezalel Smotrich |
| Meretz (5) | | Ilan Gilon • Issawi Frej • Michal Rozin • Tamar Zandberg • Mossi Raz |
| New Right (3) | | Naftali Bennett • Ayelet Shaked • Shuli Mualem |
| Independent (1) | | Orly Levy |

=== Replacements ===
The twentieth Knesset had the highest number of replacements in Israeli history, with at least 27 members leaving mid-term. Eleven of those left due to the Norwegian Law.

| Date | Replacement | Party | Replacing | Notes |
|---|---|---|---|---|
| – | Robert Ilatov | Yisrael Beiteinu | Ilan Shohat | Shohat gave up his seat before the Knesset was sworn in. As such, Shohat did not become a member. |
| 27 August 2015 | Sharren Haskel | Likud | Danny Danon | Danon was appointed Israel's representative to the United Nations. |
| 4 September 2015 | Elazar Stern | Yesh Atid | Shai Piron | Piron resigned to return to teaching. |
| 4 September 2015 | Oded Forer | Yisrael Beiteinu | Sharon Gal | Gal resigned to focus on journalism. |
| 9 October 2015 | Shuli Mualem | The Jewish Home | Naftali Bennett | Bennett resigned (but remained a minister) to allow Mualem to enter the Knesset. |
| 25 November 2015 | Yael Cohen Paran | Zionist Union | Danny Atar | Atar was elected head of the Jewish National Fund. |
| 3 December 2015 | Avi Wortzman | The Jewish Home | Yinon Magal | Magal resigned after sexual harassment allegations against him. |
| 6 December 2015 | Naftali Bennett | The Jewish Home | Avi Wortzman | Bennett returned to the Knesset after Wortzman decided to remain working at Aleh Negev. |
| 27 December 2015 | Amir Ohana | Likud | Silvan Shalom | Shalom resigned from the Knesset after a sexual harassment scandal. |
| 24 January 2016 | Yigal Guetta | Shas | Meshulam Nahari | Nahari resigned (but remained a deputy minister) to allow Guetta to enter the Knesset. |
| 29 January 2016 | Akram Hasson | Kulanu | Moshe Kahlon | Kahlon resigned (but remained a minister) to allow Hasson to enter the Knesset. |
| 23 May 2016 | Yehuda Glick | Likud | Moshe Ya'alon | Ya'alon resigned from the Knesset after resigning as Defense Minister. |
| 24 May 2016 | Ya'akov Asher | United Torah Judaism | Meir Porush | Porush stood down as part of a rotation agreement within United Torah Judaism. |
| 30 May 2016 | Yulia Malinovsky | Yisrael Beiteinu | Avigdor Lieberman | Lieberman resigned (but remained a minister) to allow Malinovsky to enter the Knesset |
| 2 November 2016 | Michael Malchieli | Shas | Aryeh Deri | Deri resigned (but remained a minister) to allow Malchieli to enter the Knesset |
| 21 March 2017 | Juma Azbarga | Joint List | Basel Ghattas | Ghattas resigned after being jailed for smuggling notes and phones to Palestinian terrorists in Israeli jails. |
| 11 August 2017 | Said al-Harumi | Joint List | Abdullah Abu Ma'aruf | Abu Ma'aruf resigned as part of a rotation agreement within the Joint List. |
| 19 September 2017 | Danny Saida | Shas | Yigal Guetta | Guetta resigned after publicly revealing that he had attended a same-sex wedding. |
| 20 September 2017 | Ibrahim Hijazi | Joint List | Osama Saadi | Saadi resigned as part of a rotation agreement within the Joint List. |
| 20 September 2017 | Meshulam Nahari | Shas | Danny Saida | Nahari returned to the Knesset after resigning his ministerial post. |
| 3 October 2017 | Saleh Saad | Zionist Union | Manuel Trajtenberg | Trajtenberg decided to retire from politics. |
| 6 October 2017 | Leah Fadida | Zionist Union | Erel Margalit | Margalit resigned to return to working in business. |
| 22 October 2017 | Mossi Raz | Meretz | Zehava Gal-On | Gal-On resigned from the Knesset. |
| 25 October 2017 | Youssef Atauna | Joint List | Ibrahim Hijazi | Hijazi resigned from the Knesset. |
| 8 February 2018 | Pnina Tamano-Shata | Yesh Atid | Yaakov Peri | Peri resigned from the Knesset after allegations that he leaked sensitive information when he was head of Shin Bet. |
| 8 February 2018 | Wael Younis | Joint List | Youssef Atauna | Atauna resigned as part of a rotation agreement within the Joint List. |
| 22 February 2018 | Danny Saida | Shas | Yitzhak Cohen | Cohen resigned under the Norwegian Law. |
| 14 March 2018 | Yinon Azulai | Shas | David Azulai | David Azulai resigned under the Norwegian Law. |
| 31 July 2018 | Robert Tiviaev | Zionist Union | Isaac Herzog | Herzog resigned from the Knesset after being elected Chairman of the Jewish Agency. |
| 10 August 2018 | Niven Abu Rahmoun | Joint List | Wael Younis | Younis resigned as part of the rotation agreement within the Joint List. |
| 18 October 2018 | Moshe Mizrahi | Zionist Union | Zouheir Bahloul | Bahloul resigned from the Knesset in protest at the nation-state law. |
| 18 November 2018 | Osnat Mark | Likud | Jackie Levy | Levy left the Knesset after being elected mayor of Beit She'an. |
| 18 November 2018 | Avigdor Lieberman | Yisrael Beiteinu | Yulia Malinovsky | Malinovsky left the Knesset after Lieberman's resignation as Defense Minister. |
| 2 January 2019 | Fentahun Seyoum | Kulanu | Yoav Gallant | Gallant left the Knesset after joining Likud. |

== See also ==
- Thirty-fourth government of Israel
