= Yaron Mazuz =

Israeli politician (born 1962)

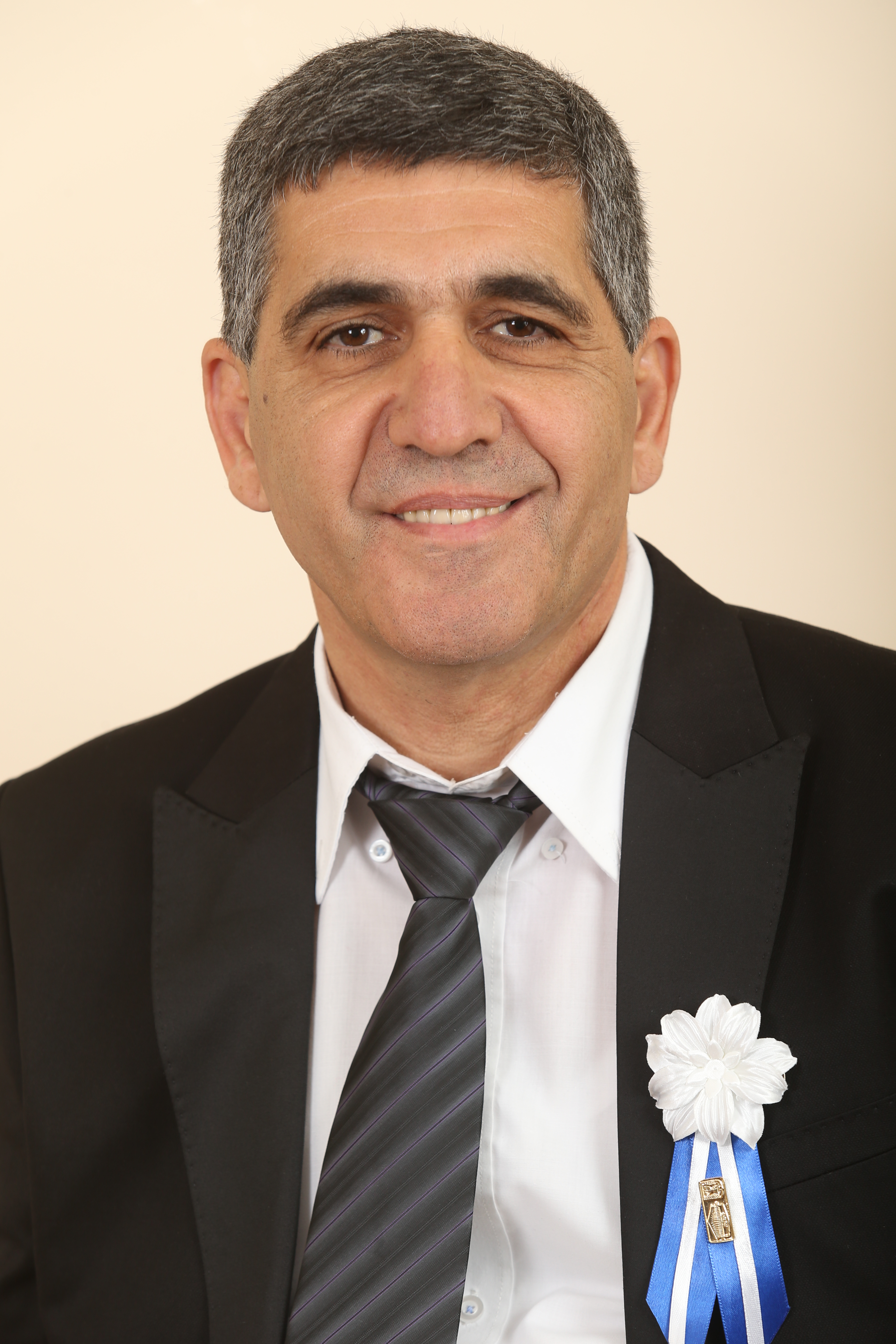
- Mazuz in 2015

Faction represented in the Knesset
- 2015–2019: Likud

Personal details
- Born: 11 July 1962 (age 63) Haifa, Israel

Yaron Mazuz (Hebrew: ירון מזוז; born 11 July 1962) is an Israeli politician who served as a member of the Knesset for Likud between 2015 and 2019 and held several deputy ministerial portfolios.

== Biography ==
Mazuz was born in Haifa to parents who had immigrated from Tunisia. He was elected to Kiryat Bialik City Council in 2008 and served as the city's Deputy Mayor.

Prior to the 2015 elections he was placed 29th on the Likud list, and was elected to the Knesset as Likud won 30 seats. On 14 June he was appointed Deputy Interior Minister in the new government. In June 2015 he told Arab MKs “We are doing you people a favor by even allowing you to be seated here – terrorists won't be allowed to sit here,” and asked them to give up their Israeli citizenship. Several left-wing members of Knesset demanded an apology from Mazuz, but he refused to retract his statement, adding that the proposal to revoke the ban on citizenship for Palestinians was “written in blood.”

In January 2016 Mazuz was replaced as Deputy Interior Minister by Meshulam Nahari, and given the post of Deputy Minister in the Prime Minister's Office. In August 2016 he was transferred to become Minister of Environmental Protection. He lost his seat in the April 2019 elections after only being placed forty-eighth on the Likud list.

Mazuz is married with three children, and lives in Kiryat Bialik.
