= Fentahun Seyoum =

Israeli politician

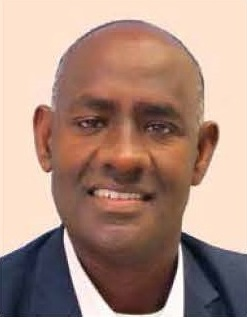
- Seyoum in 2019

Faction represented in the Knesset
- 2019: Kulanu

Personal details
- Born: 20 August 1971 (age 53); Ethiopia

Asher Fentahun Seyoum (Hebrew: אשר פנטהון סיום; born 20 August 1971) is an Israeli politician who served as a member of the Knesset for Kulanu in 2019.

== Biography ==
Seyoum emigrated to Israel from Ethiopia in 1984 at the age of 13. His family initially lived in a Jewish Agency absorption centre in Netanya, and Seyoum went on to attend a boarding school. During his national service, he was a physical education instructor. After leaving the army, he worked in Kfar Haroeh at Ben Yakir for eight years. He later worked at the Wingate Institute, before becoming director of country's largest immigrant absorption centre in Safed.

After joining the new Kulanu party prior to the 2015 elections, Seyoum was placed fourteenth on the party list. Although the party won only ten seats in the elections, Seyoum entered the Knesset on 2 January 2019 as a replacement for Yoav Gallant. Despite being moved up to eighth place for the April 2019 elections, he lost his seat as Kulanu were reduced to four seats.
