= Ziv Agmon =

- זיו אגמון

Israel's Prime Minister Spokesperson
- Assuming office 19th June 2025
- Prime Minister: Benjamin Netanyahu
- Succeeding: Omer Dostri

Personal details
- Born: 1983 (age 42–43) United States
- Party: Likud

Ziv Agmon (Hebrew: זיו אגמון; born 1983) is an Israeli lawyer who served as spokesperson for Israeli Prime Minister Benjamin Netanyahu.

== Biography ==
Agmon was born in Chicago and immigrated to Israel with his family at the age of 13. They lived in Kfar Netter in the Hof HaSharon Regional Council. His mother is attorney Ruthy Agmon, an expert in personal status and family law and a long-time Likud activist. His sister, Paz, appeared in the fourth season of the reality show TLV – Osim et Tel Aviv.

== Career ==
Agmon served in the Israeli Intelligence Corps Unit 8200, and after he completed his service in the Israel Defense Forces, he studied law and worked as an attorney at the family firm, "Agmon & Co.," which specializes in corporate liquidation, receivership, real estate, and litigation.

Agmon was a member of the Israeli Labor Party's Central Committee and recruited members for the party on behalf of Amir Peretz - its chairman at the time. On 2006, after Amir Peretz established the Kadima party, Agmon's membership in the Labor Central Committee was revoked. His mother, Ruth, supported the Likud party under Benjamin Netanyahu.

Later that year, Agmon joined as a member of the Likud party and sought a spot on its Knesset electoral list. He served as chairman of the Likud's "Moshavim Headquarters" and advocated for the rights of farmers and residents in the peripheral areas of Israel. During the 2015 election campaign for the 2015 Israeli legislative election, Agmon was placed 35th on the Likud list; however, the party won 30 seats and he did not enter the Knesset. In 2019, he competed for the reserved slot for the Galilee-Valleys district but lost to Ofir Katz. Subsequently, he ran in the reserved slot for Tel Aviv's district and finished in third place.

In June 2025, Prime Minister Benjamin Netanyahu announced that Agmon would work as a spokesperson in his office. His appointment was accompanied by reports of internal tension within the spokesperson's team, which intensified following news of the departure of the previous spokesperson, Omer Dostri.

In July 2025, the Israel Bar Association suspended Ziv Agmon for 10 months, following a complaint filed against him by the association's Central District Ethics Committee. The committee determined that Agmon had committed violations involving a breach of duty and loyalty to a client. Agmon appealed the decision in the Jerusalem District Court.

On 24 March 2026, the Israeli news website Channel 12 published harsh remarks made by Agmon over the years regarding Netanyahu, his wife Sara Netanyahu, the Likud party and the Shas party, as well as racist remarks directed at Mizrahi Jews and Mizrahi Likud MKs. A day after the article was published, Agmon announced his resignation, and a few days after his resignation, he claims that the remarks were "private jokes" and that he apologises to anyone who was offended by them. Despite his resignation, Agmon continued his work in the affairs of the prime minister's office. On 5 April 2026, Netanyahu said he accepted Agmon apology and claimed that he asked him to stay in his role until he will find a replacement.
