= Danny Saida =

Israeli politician

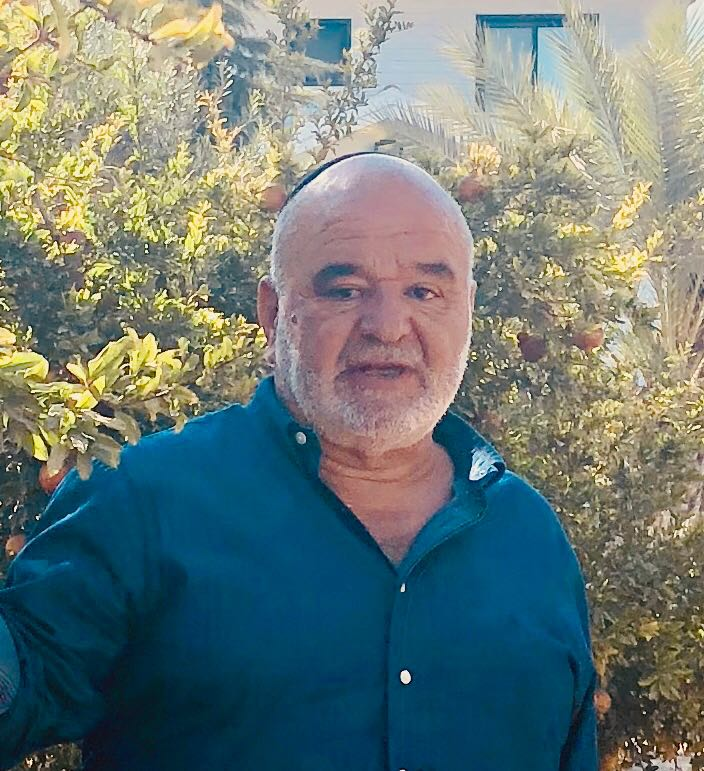
- Saida in 2018

Faction represented in the Knesset
- 2017: Shas
- 2018–2019: Shas

Personal details
- Born: 26 April 1959 (age 66); Israel

Dan "Danny" Saida (Hebrew: דן "דני" סיידא; born 26 April 1959) is an Israeli politician who served as a member of the Knesset for Shas in 2017, and again between 2018 and 2019.

== Background ==
Saida was placed fourteenth on the Shas list for the 2015 Knesset elections, but failed to become a Knesset member when Shas won seven seats. When Shas MK Yigal Guetta resigned after publicly revealing that he had attended a same-sex wedding, the next-in-line candidates Rafael Bernez and Boaz Biton both resigned from the list, allowing Saida to enter the Knesset on 19 September 2017 as a replacement for Guetta. However, Shas' Meshulam Nahari had resigned as a Deputy Minister on 18 September, allowing him to re-enter the Knesset (he had previously resigned under the Norwegian Law that allows ministers to resign their seats, but retake them if they lose their portfolio, and had himself been replaced by Guetta), meaning that Saida was only an MK for one day, three hours and 35 minutes.

However, in February 2018, fellow Shas MK Yitzhak Cohen resigned from the Knesset under the Norwegian Law, with Saida nominated as his replacement. He re-entered the Knesset on 22 February.

On 20 February 2019, Saida announced that he was retiring from politics and would not contest the April Knesset elections.
