= Yoav Gallant =

Israeli politician & military officer (born 1958)

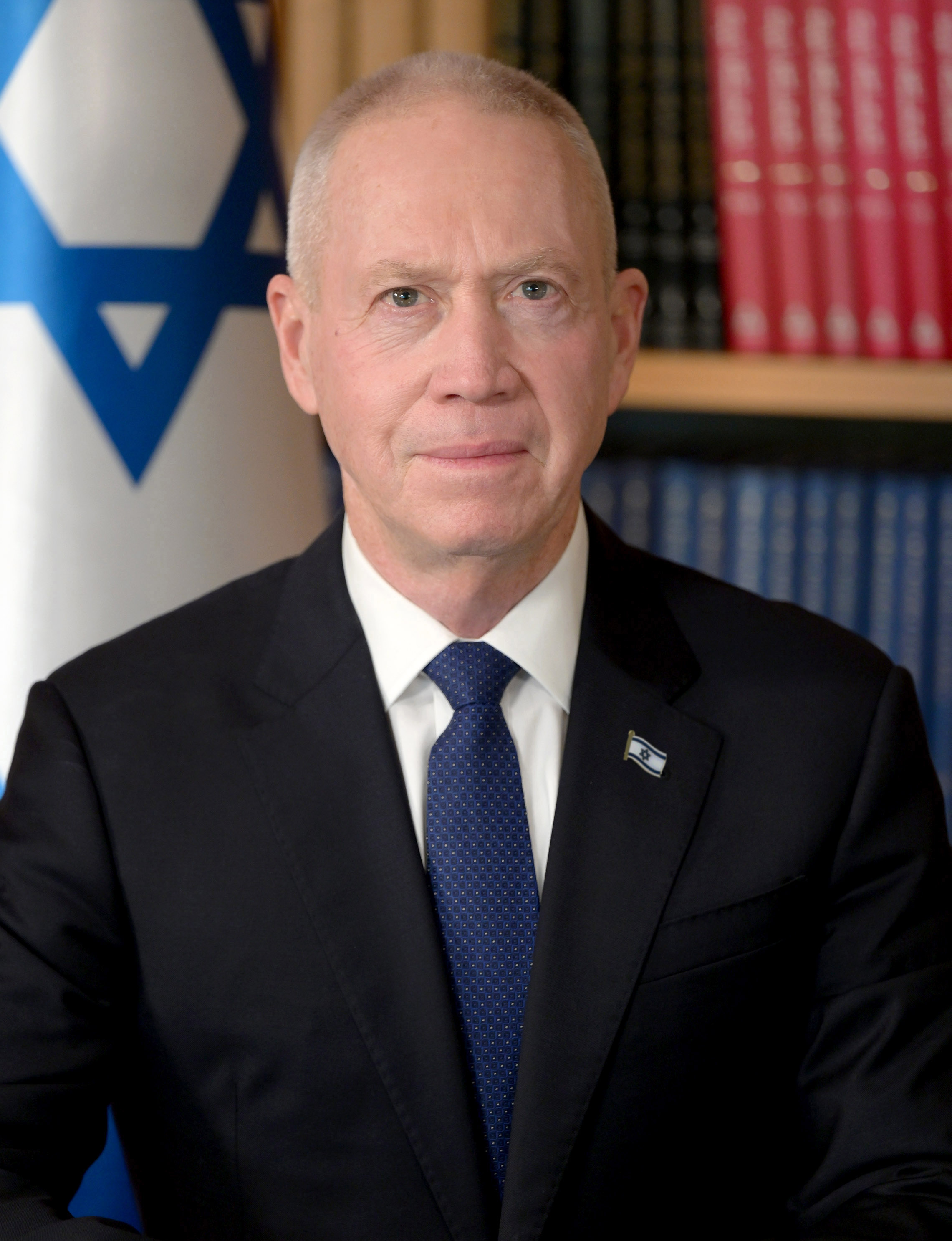
- Gallant in 2023

Ministerial portfolios
- 2015–2019: Minister of Construction
- 2019–2020: Minister of Aliyah & Integration
- 2020–2021: Minister of Education
- 2022–2024: Minister of Defense

Faction represented in the Knesset
- 2015–2019: Kulanu
- 2019–2025: Likud

Personal details
- Born: 8 November 1958 (age 68) Jaffa, Israel

Military service
- Allegiance: Israel
- Branch/service: Israeli Navy
- Years of service: 1977–1982, 1984–2012
- Rank: Major general
- Commands: Southern Command
- Battles/wars: 2006 Lebanon War; Gaza War (2008–2009)

Yoav Gallant (Note: Hebrew: יוֹאָב גָּלַנְט) (born 8 November 1958) is an Israeli politician and former military officer who served as minister of defense between 2022 and 2024. Gallant was an officer in the Southern Command of the Israel Defense Forces, serving in the Israeli Navy. In January 2015, he entered politics, joining the new Kulanu party. After being elected to the Knesset, he was appointed minister of construction. At the end of 2018, he joined Likud; shortly afterwards, he became minister of Aliyah and Integration. In 2020, he was appointed minister of education. He became minister of defense the following year. On 5 November 2024, Prime Minister Benjamin Netanyahu announced that he had dismissed Gallant, effective 7 November, and sought to have Israel Katz replace him. Gallant subsequently resigned from the Knesset on 5 January 2025.

On 21 November 2024, the International Criminal Court issued an arrest warrant for Gallant, along with Netanyahu and three Hamas leaders, for alleged war crimes and crimes against humanity committed during the Gaza war.

== Biography ==
Yoav Gallant was born on 8 November 1958 in Jaffa to Polish Jewish immigrants. His mother, Fruma, was a Holocaust survivor who had been on the SS Exodus as a child. Along with other Exodus refugees, she was deported by the British to Hamburg, and arrived in Israel in 1948. She was a nurse by profession. His father, Michael, fought the Nazis as a partisan in the forests of Ukraine and Belarus, and also immigrated to Israel in 1948. He served in the Givati Brigade in the 1948 Arab–Israeli War, including the Samson's Foxes unit, and was considered one of the finest snipers in the IDF. He participated in Operation Yoav, during which he was the first soldier to break into the fort at Iraq Suwaydan. He named his son for the operation. In Gallant's youth, the family moved to Givatayim, where he studied at David Kalai High School. He received a B.A. in business and finance management from the University of Haifa.

Gallant lives in moshav Amikam. He is married to Claudine, a retired IDF Lieutenant Colonel. They have a son and two daughters.

In 2011, Gallant was tapped to succeed Gabi Ashkenazi as the Chief of General Staff by Defense Minister Ehud Barak. Although his appointment was approved by the government it was overturned due to allegations of building of an unauthorized access road to his home and planting an olive grove on public land outside the boundaries of his property.

== Military career ==
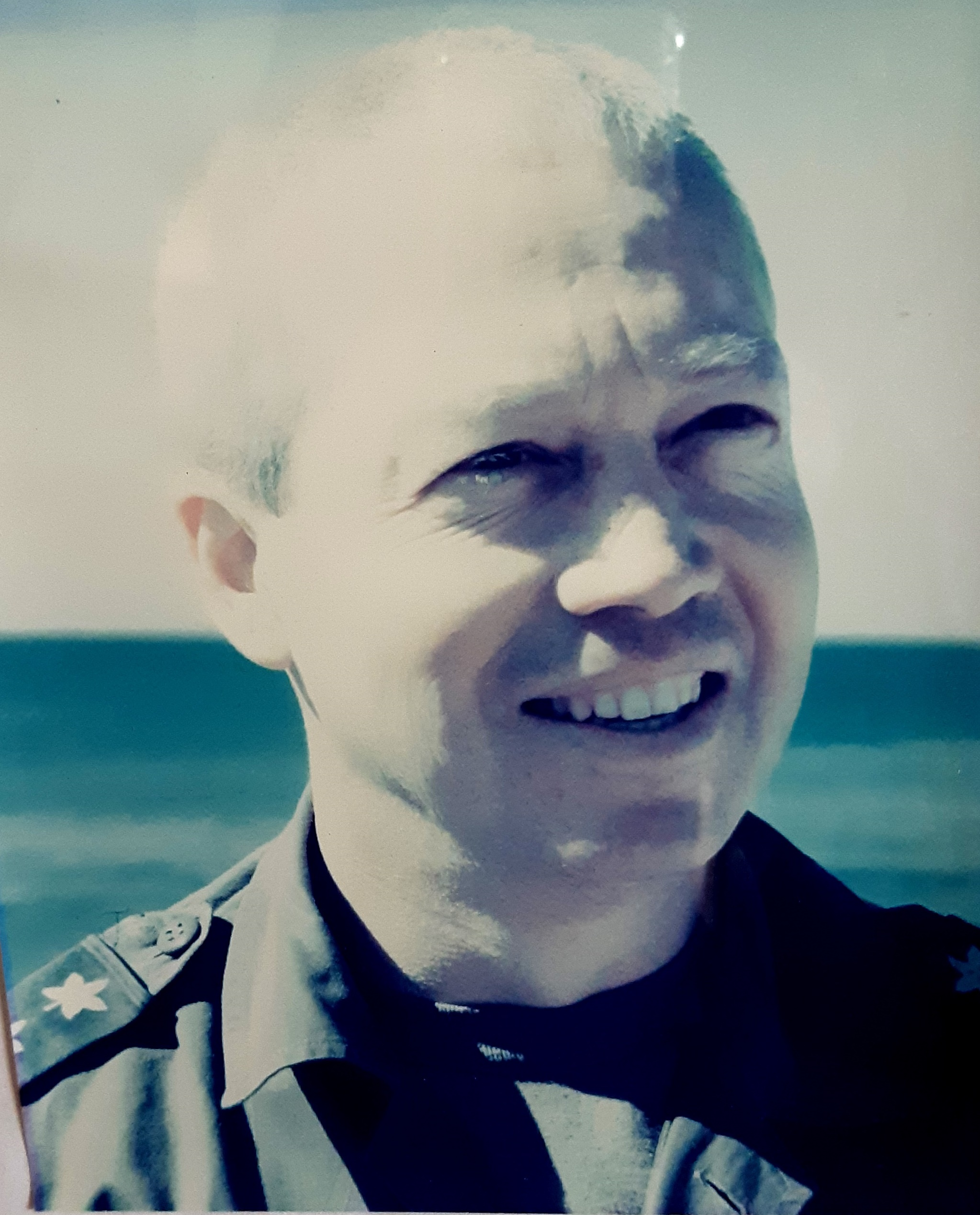
Gallant in 1995 as commander of Shayetet 13

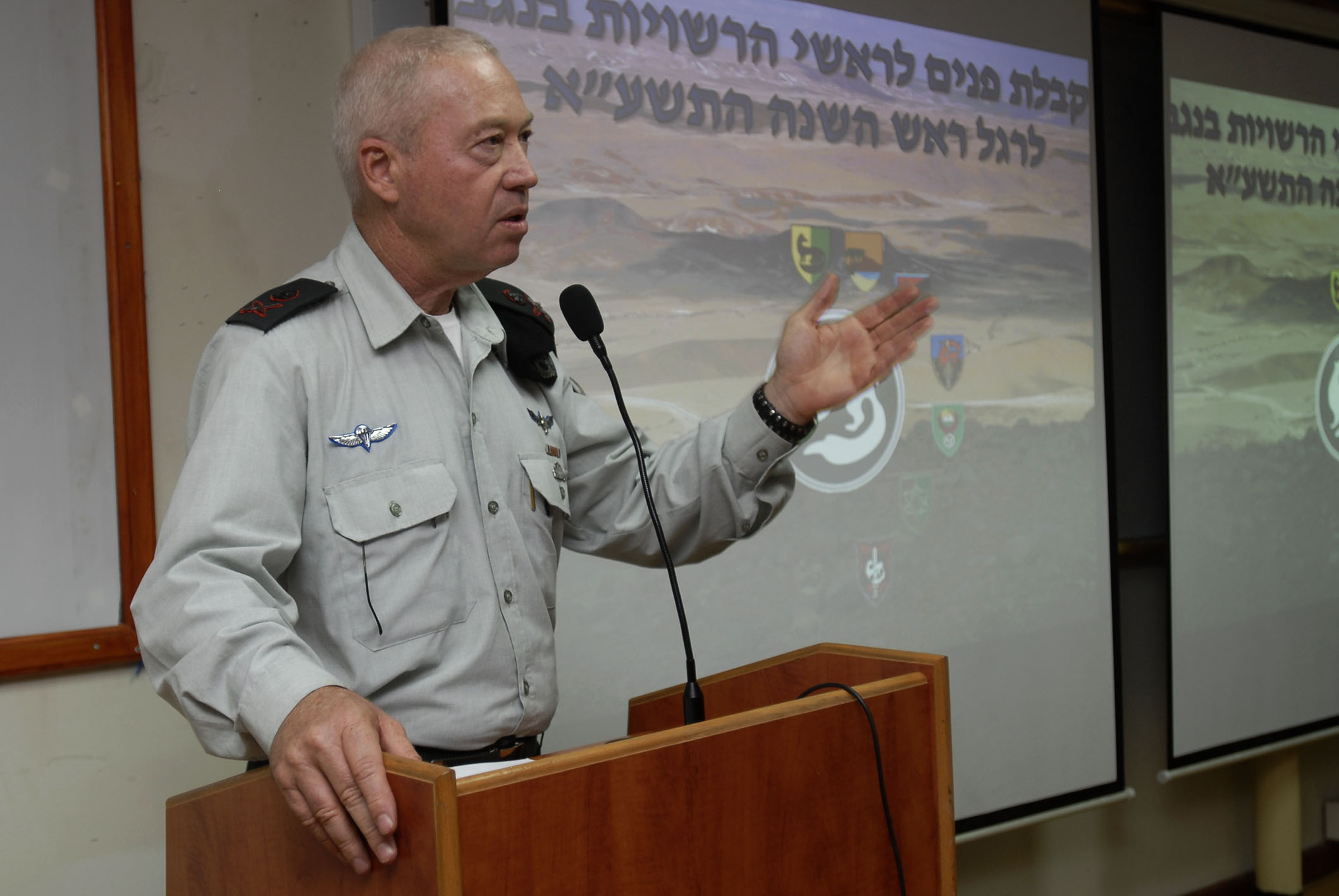
Gallant in September 2010

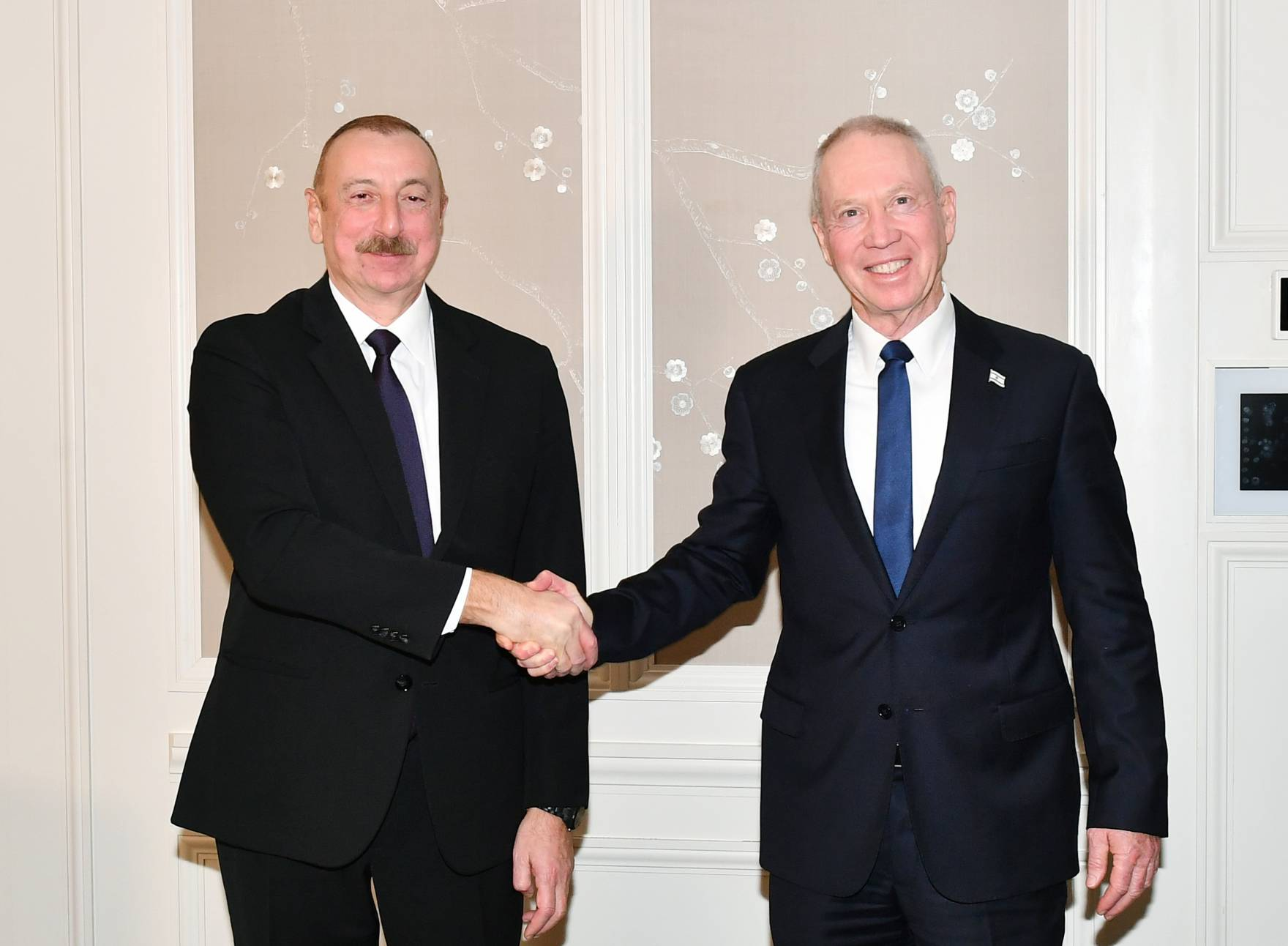
Gallant with Azerbaijani President Ilham Aliyev at the Munich Security Conference in Germany, 17 February 2023

Gallant began his military career in 1977 as a naval commando in Shayetet 13. In the 1980s, after six years of active service, he moved to Alaska and worked as a lumberjack. He then returned to the navy and served on a missile boat (including a position as deputy-commander of INS Keshet) and again in Shayetet 13. In 1992, Gallant was earmarked by then-navy commander Ami Ayalon for the command of Shayetet 13, a position he was meant to take up in 1994. Gallant preferred not to study during the two remaining years, and instead moved into the ground forces and in 1993 took up command of the Menashe Territorial Brigade of the Judea and Samaria Division.

After serving for three years as commander of Shayetet 13, Gallant moved up to command the Gaza Division. He also commanded the reserve 340th Armored Division (Idan Formation), and in 2001 became the chief of staff of the GOC Army Headquarters. Gallant attained the rank of a major general when he became the military secretary of the prime minister in 2002.

In 2005, Gallant was appointed as commander of the Southern Command. During his tenure (that lasted until 21 October 2010), Hamas launched the 25 June 2006 Gaza cross-border raid that resulted in the deaths of two IDF soldiers and the capture of a third, Gilad Shalit. The IDF then launched Operation Summer Rains, that resulted in a decrease of Hamas rocket-fire for some time but failed to free Shalit. Also during his tenure, the Israel Defense Forces embarked on Operation Cast Lead against Hamas in the Gaza Strip from December 2008 until January 2009, which again temporarily minimized Hamas rocket-fire but also again failed to find and deliver Shalit, who would be eventually exchanged in 2011 for 1,027 Palestinians imprisoned in Israel. Gallant commanded the operation and his role in the field and in what was at that time considered the success of the operation gained praise and helped him in the race to chief of staff. However, Gallant and the IDF were criticized for the implementation of the Dahiya doctrine of widespread destruction of civilian infrastructure in the Gaza War of 2008–09, with the Goldstone Report concluding that the Israeli strategy was "designed to punish, humiliate and terrorize a civilian population".

Israeli NGO Yesh Gvul filed suit against Gallant's appointment as IDF chief of staff, claiming that his command role in Cast Lead confirmed him as a suspect in "grave violations of international law." Haaretz noted that Gallant lobbied against an investigation of Col. Ilan Malka, the IDF commander who approved the airstrike that killed 21 members of the al-Samouni clan during Cast Lead. Gallant's view was ignored as the military prosecutor general opened an investigation of the incident which was highlighted by the Goldstone Report as a "possible serious breach of international law".

=== Chief of Staff candidacy ===
On 22 August 2010 Minister of Defense Ehud Barak presented the candidacy of Gallant for the post of the IDF's twentieth chief of staff to the government. It was expected that he would receive the promotion. Gallant's appointment followed a controversy, where a forged document was leaked to Israel's Channel 2 purporting to detail plans by Gallant to smear rival candidate Benny Gantz.

On 5 September 2010 the government approved the nomination of Gallant as the next chief of staff, with only Likud minister Michael Eitan objecting. Prime Minister Benjamin Netanyahu said that the incoming IDF chief had "proven his worth during his 33 years of military service at the IDF's frontlines," and that "He's proven himself to be a courageous fighter, an excellent officer, and a responsible and serious battle commander." The PM added that Gallant picked up on a legacy of "dedication and excellence" bequeathed by incumbent IDF chief Gabi Ashkenazi. The cabinet also approved Barak's proposal, according to which Gallant would serve for three years, giving the defense minister power to grant a fourth.

On 1 February 2011 Netanyahu and Barak canceled Gallant's appointment as Israel Defense Forces chief. The announcement came after months of scandal surrounding his appointment due to allegations that he had seized public lands near his home in Moshav Amikam. After conducting an investigation into the allegations, Attorney General Yehuda Weinstein said that his findings "raise significant legal difficulties for the decision to appoint him." Weinstein said that it was up to the prime minister and defense minister to decide whether or not Gallant could take up the post. Earlier in the day, Weinstein notified Netanyahu that he could not defend Gallant's appointment as chief of staff due to legal impediments.

On 30 December 2012 the local planning committee administering land ownership issues and building licenses said that Gallant had built his home in the northern community of Amikam on 350m² of property accidentally listed as his, unaware that it was actually public land. The decision did not address two other issues still being investigated by the state comptroller and attorney general: the building of an unauthorized access road to his house and the planting of an olive grove that spilled over the boundaries of his property.

== Political career ==
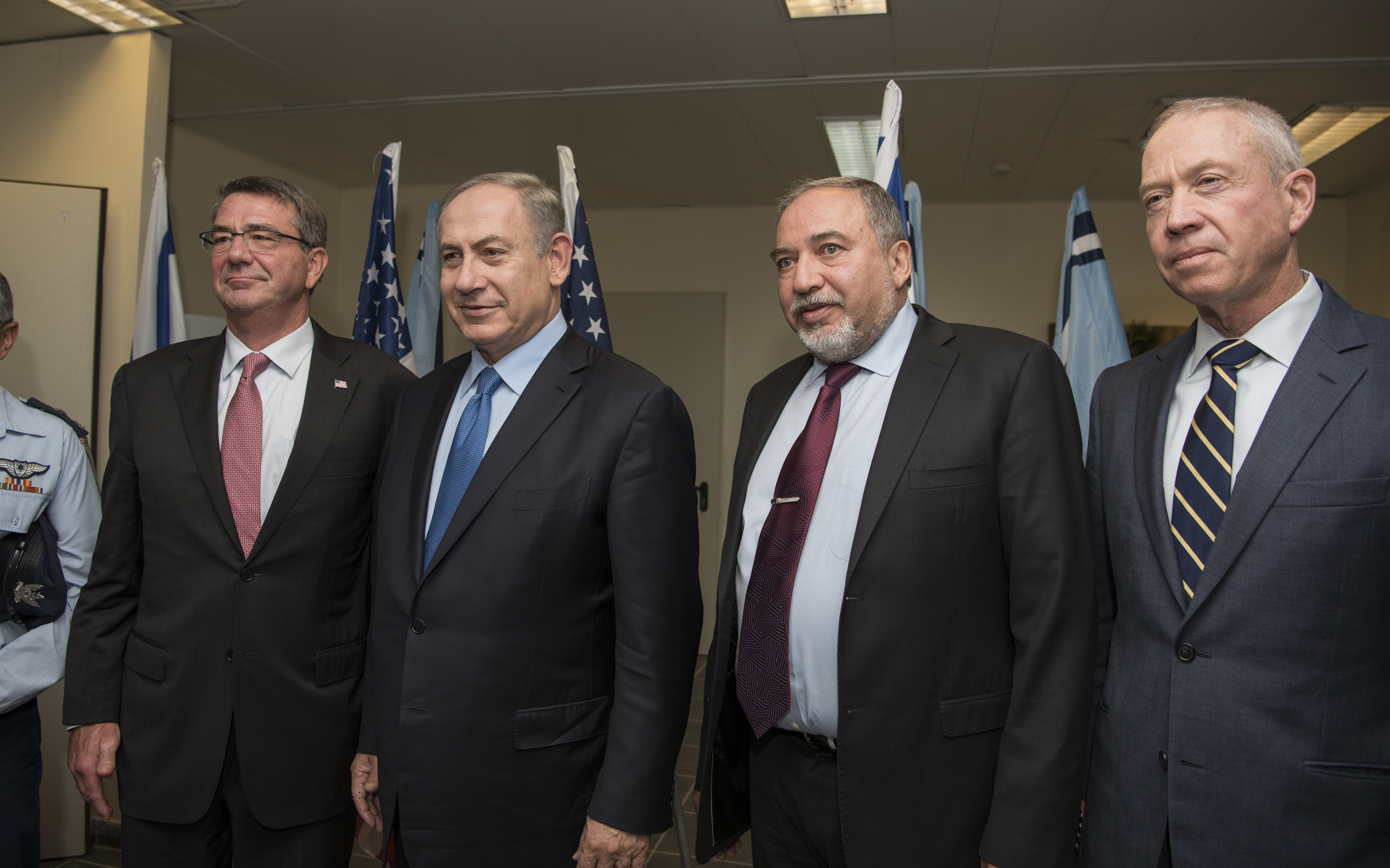
Gallant with Prime Minister Netanyahu, Defense Minister Avigdor Lieberman and U.S. defense secretary Ash Carter at the Nevatim Airbase in Israel, 12 December 2016

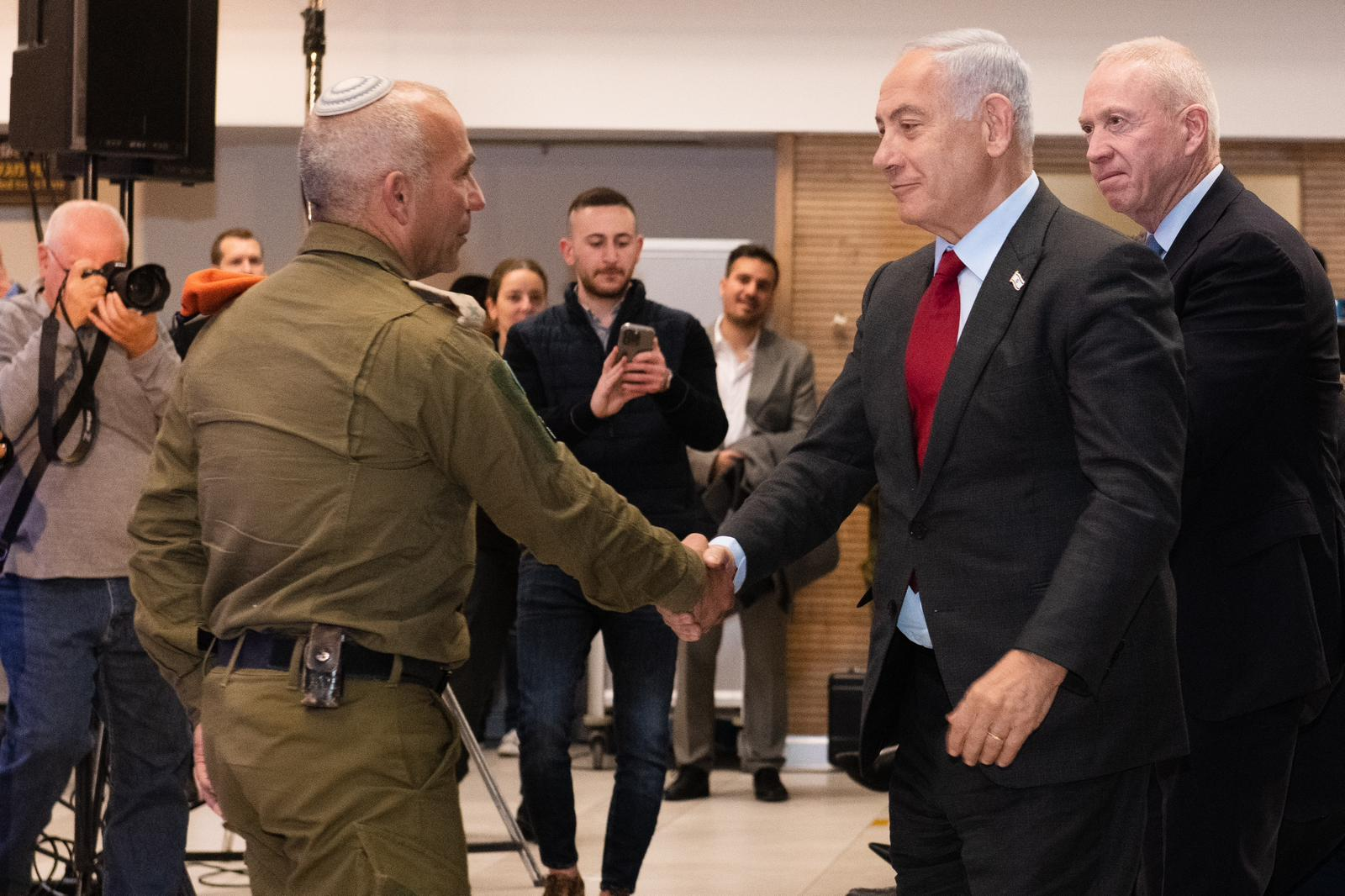
Gallant and Benjamin Netanyahu on 13 February 2023

=== Kulanu ===
In January 2015 Gallant joined the new Kulanu party led by Moshe Kahlon. He was placed second on the party's list for the 2015 elections, and was elected to the Knesset as the party won ten seats. He was later appointed Minister of Construction in the new government.

In January 2016 the New York Times published an op-ed by Gallant in which he described how important he believes it is for Jewish and Arab leaders to come together in promoting peace and equality in their shared country. As part of that effort, he and MK Ayman Odeh, leader of the Joint List alliance of Arab parties, together visited several Arab Israeli towns. "Together, we examined firsthand the challenges facing Arab Israeli communities so that we could bring about solutions," he noted.

=== Likud ===
On 31 December 2018, Gallant quit his post as Housing and Construction Minister to join Likud. A day later he was appointed Minister of Aliyah and Integration. He resigned from the Knesset and was replaced by the next candidate on the Kulanu list, Fentahun Seyoum on 2 January 2019.

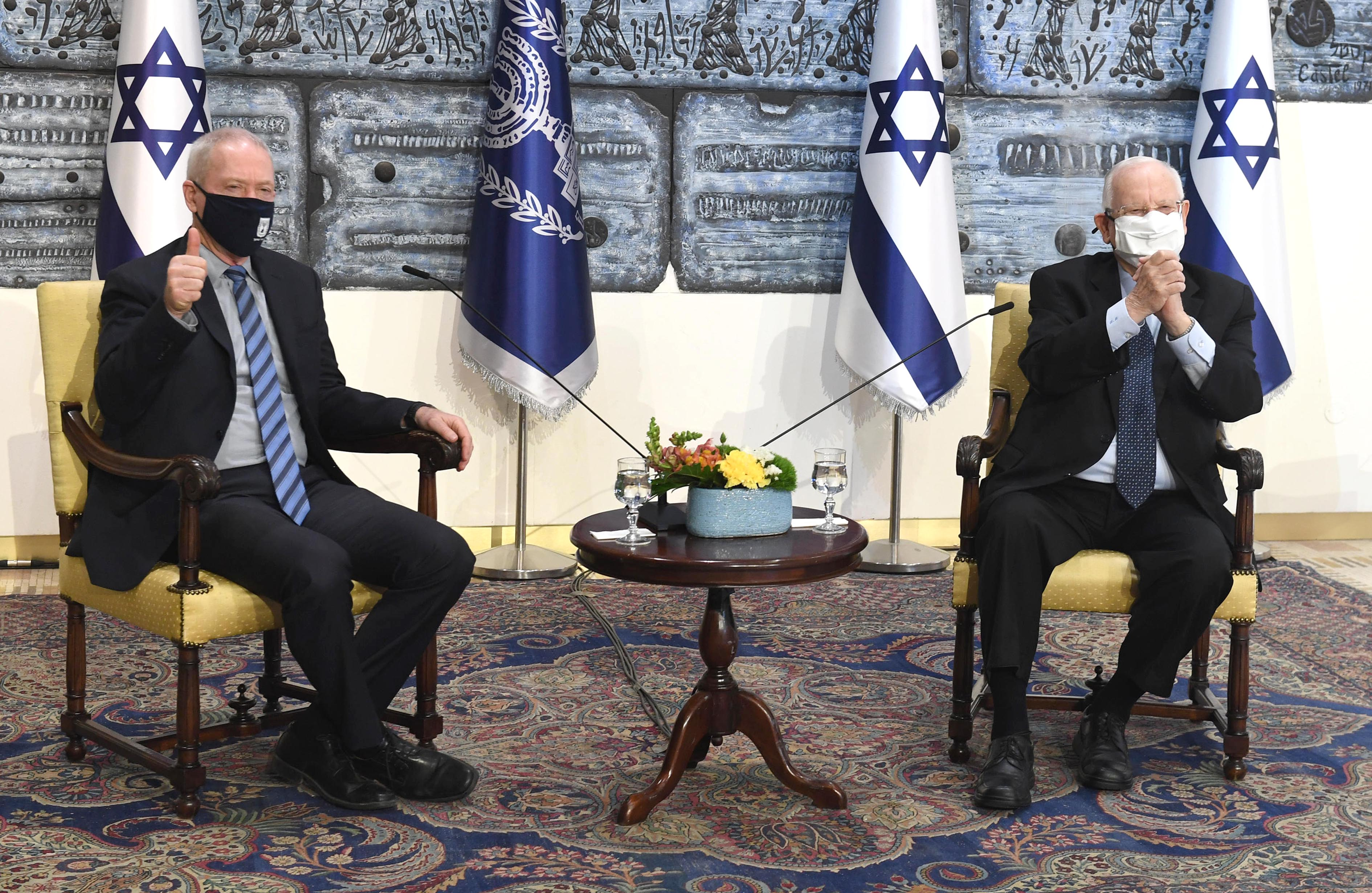
Gallant and Israeli President Reuven Rivlin during the COVID-19 pandemic, 19 January 2021

After the formation of the Thirty-fifth government of Israel Gallant was appointed minister of education.

On 17 January 2021, reacting to a planned speech by the director-general of B'Tselem Hagai El-Ad at the Hebrew Reali School, Gallant, serving as the minister of education, published a directive to the Education Ministry to forbid all organizations whose causes contradict the Ministry's vision of the country as democratic, Jewish and Zionist, from entering schools.

Specifically, Gallant wrote that any organization which cites Israel as an "apartheid state", shall be forbidden from entering education centers in Israel.

In 2021, as minister of education, Gallant opposed Weizmann Institute professor Oded Goldreich receiving the Israel Prize in mathematics, due to him co-signing a 2019 letter that called for the Bundestag not to pass legislation defining the Boycott, Divestment and Sanctions (BDS) movement as anti-Semitic. On 8 April 2021 Israel's Supreme Court of Justice ruled in favor of Gallant's petition so that Goldreich could not receive the prize and gave Gallant a month to further examine the issue. In March 2022 the High Court of Israel ruled that the 2021 prize had to be awarded to Prof. Goldreich.

=== Judicial reform ===
On 25 March 2023, Gallant spoke out against his own government in support of the protests against the government's proposed judicial reforms. He asked for the government to delay the proposed legislation to allow for negotiations between the ruling coalition and the opposition, which resulted in National Security Minister Itamar Ben-Gvir calling for Gallant's dismissal. Netanyahu announced on 26 March that he was dismissing Gallant, sparking massive protests that night in several major cities across Israel. That night is known as 'Gallant Night' in Israel, possibly as an allusion to the phrase, 'gallant knight'. The following day, Gallant's office stated that he would be continuing in his post, as he had not yet been given an official notice of his dismissal. On 10 April, Netanyahu announced that he would not dismiss Gallant.

=== Minister of Defense ===
On 8 August 2023, Gallant warned that Israel would not hesitate to attack Hezbollah and "return Lebanon to the Stone Age" if Israel was attacked.

On 9 October 2023, following the beginning of the Gaza war and attacks in Israel by Hamas militants, Gallant said he had "ordered a complete siege on the Gaza Strip. There will be no electricity, no food, no water, no fuel. Everything is closed. We are fighting human animals and we are acting accordingly".

On 13 October 2023, Gallant met with US secretary of defense Lloyd Austin. Gallant called on Palestinians to evacuate northern Gaza, including Gaza City, saying: "The camouflage of the terrorists is the civilian population. Therefore, we need to separate them. So those who want to save their lives, please go south. We are going to destroy Hamas infrastructure, Hamas headquarters, Hamas military establishment, and take these phenomena out of Gaza and out of the Earth." On 13 October, he said that "Gaza won't return to what it was before. Hamas won't be there. We will eliminate everything." Gallant said he had "released all restraints" as he addressed Israeli troops on the border with the Gaza Strip.

In November 2023, Gallant warned that Beirut could meet the same fate as Gaza. He made the same warning in January 2024, saying that allowing Hezbollah and Iran to "decide how we live our lives here in Israel" is "something we don't accept."

During South Africa's submission to the International Court of Justice (ICJ) that Israel was committing genocide against the Palestinians, the president of the ICJ cited Gallant for using the phrase "human animals" in reference to Palestinians. Gallant described South Africa's submission as antisemitic.

On 25 March 2024, after the UN Security Council adopted a resolution calling for a ceasefire in the Gaza war, Gallant said that Israel has "no moral right to stop the war in Gaza." On 14 April 2024, Gallant thanked Lloyd Austin and the entire U.S. Administration for "standing boldly" with Israel.

On 15 May 2024, during the Israeli invasion of the Gaza Strip, Gallant convened a press conference in which he criticized Netanyahu for rejecting dealing with the question of "the day after" in the Gaza Strip. The defense minister called on the prime minister to announce that Israel will not control Gaza, and expressed his opposition to a military government in the Strip.

On 20 May 2024, an arrest warrant for Gallant, as well as for other Israeli and Hamas leaders, was requested by the International Criminal Court (ICC) prosecutor Karim Khan as part of the ICC investigation in Palestine, on several counts of war crimes and crimes against humanity during the Gaza war. On 20 September 2024, the Israeli Ministry of Foreign Affairs announced it was challenging the ICC jurisdiction and the legality of the arrest warrants. On 21 November, the ICC Trial Chamber unanimously rejected Israel's request and indicted Gallant.

On 8 June 2024, the Israeli military rescued four hostages in a special operation in the Nuseirat refugee camp in central Gaza. Gallant called the rescue operation "one of the most heroic and extraordinary operations" that he had "witnessed over the course of 47 years serving in Israel's defense establishment."

In June 2024 he visited the United States, where he sought to gain support for an escalation of the war with Hezbollah and a possible ground invasion in Lebanon.

Following the 2024 Lebanon electronic device attacks, Gallant announced a "new phase" of the war in northern Israel and Lebanon had begun. Just before the blasts, Gallant told the US defense secretary Lloyd Austin that an operation was planned in Lebanon.

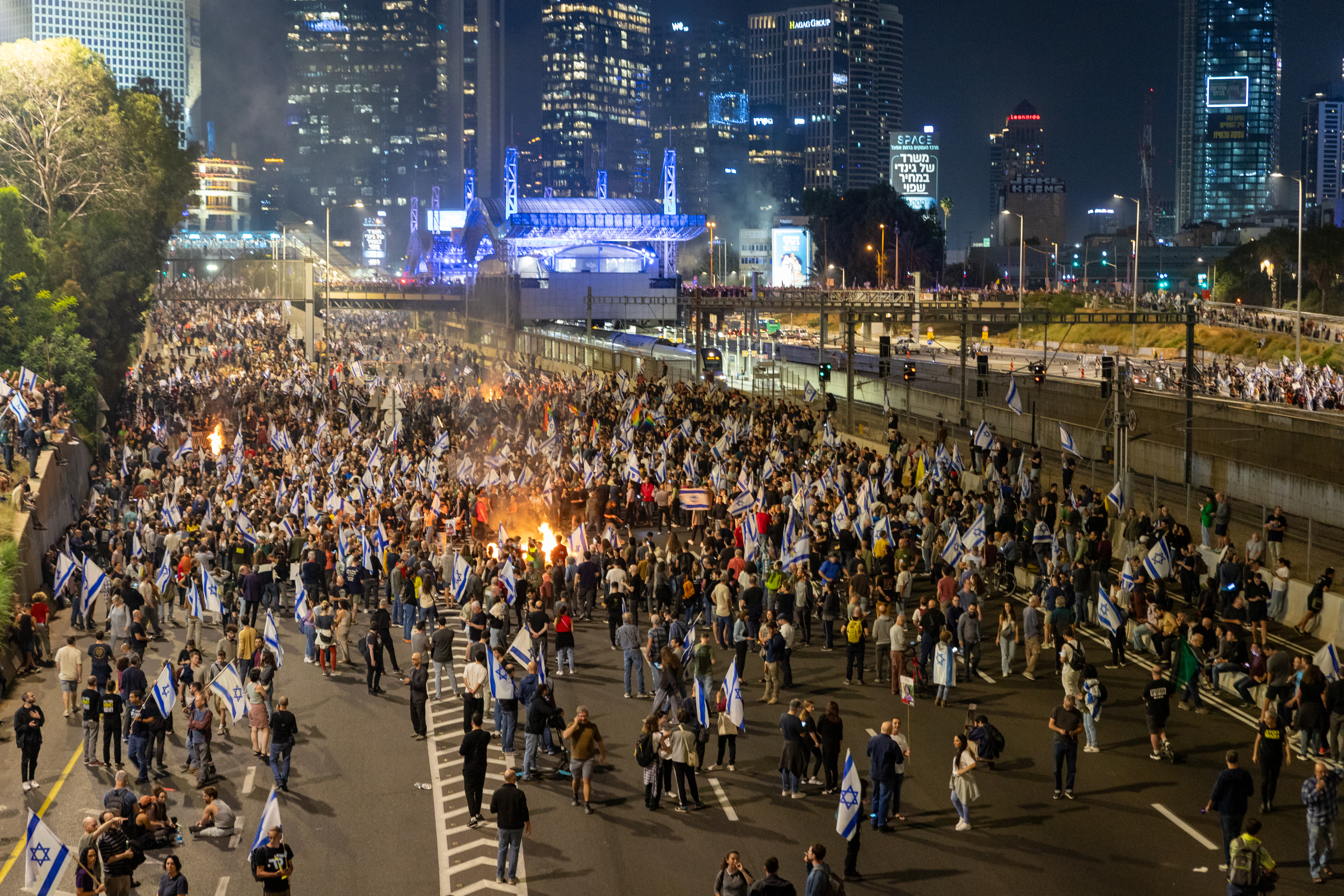
Israelis demonstrating against Gallant's dismissal in Tel Aviv on 5 November 2024

On 5 November 2024, Netanyahu announced that he had dismissed Gallant and sought to have Israel Katz replace him. Gallant said that his sacking was caused by his desire to see the quick return of Israeli hostages in Gaza and an inquiry into the 7 October attacks, whereas Netanyahu simply attributed it to a lack of trust between the two. Protests against his firing broke out, with many calling for a continuation of the previous protests, known as Gallant Night.

On 21 November 2024, the International Criminal Court issued arrest warrants for Gallant, Netanyahu, and Hamas leaders Mohammed Deif, Ismail Haniyeh and Yahya Sinwar (the latter three of whom were dead by that time) for alleged war crimes committed during the Gaza war. One of the key allegations against Gallant and Netanyahu was the "use of starvation as a weapon of war". The use of starvation as weapon of war is banned by the United Nations. A few weeks before that the arrest warrants were issued, there were also reports of looting occurring in areas controlled by the IDF.

=== Retirement ===
Gallant announced his intention to resign from the Knesset on 1 January 2025 in opposition to the government's proposed draft law. His resignation went into effect on 5 January, and he was replaced in the Knesset by Afif Abed.

In February 2025, in his first interview out of office, with Channel 12, Gallant said that he issued the Hannibal Directive in some places during the 7 October attacks. In the interview he confirmed of giving the order in certain areas. He also insisted on launching a military offensive in Gaza despite warnings that such an attack could endanger the Israeli hostages held there. He stated, "I think that, tactically, in some places, it was given, and in other places, it was not given, and that is a problem."

== Gallery ==
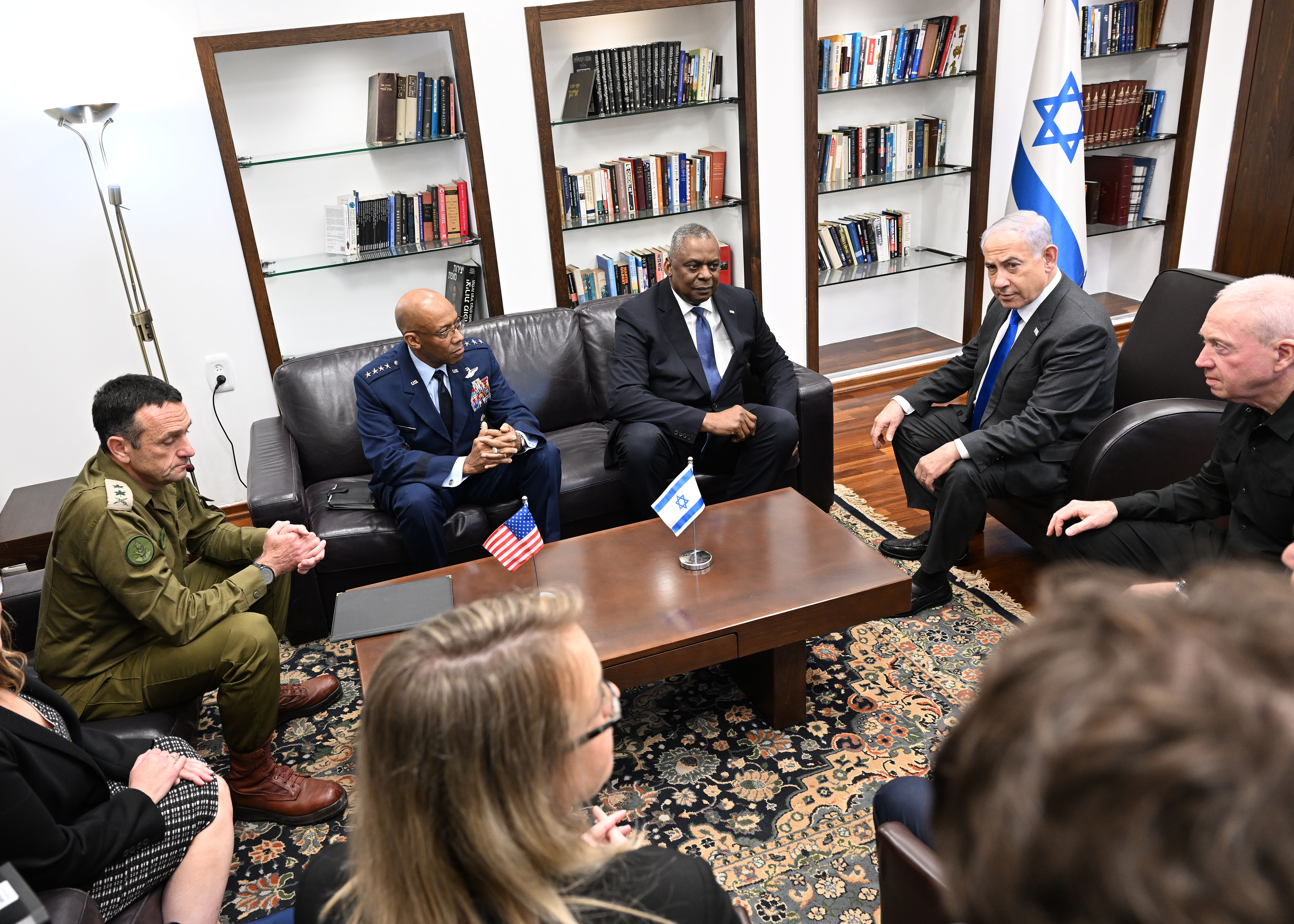
Gallant with Prime Minister Netanyahu, US Secretary of Defense Lloyd Austin, US military chief CQ Brown and IDF Chief Herzi Halevi in Tel Aviv, 18 December 2023

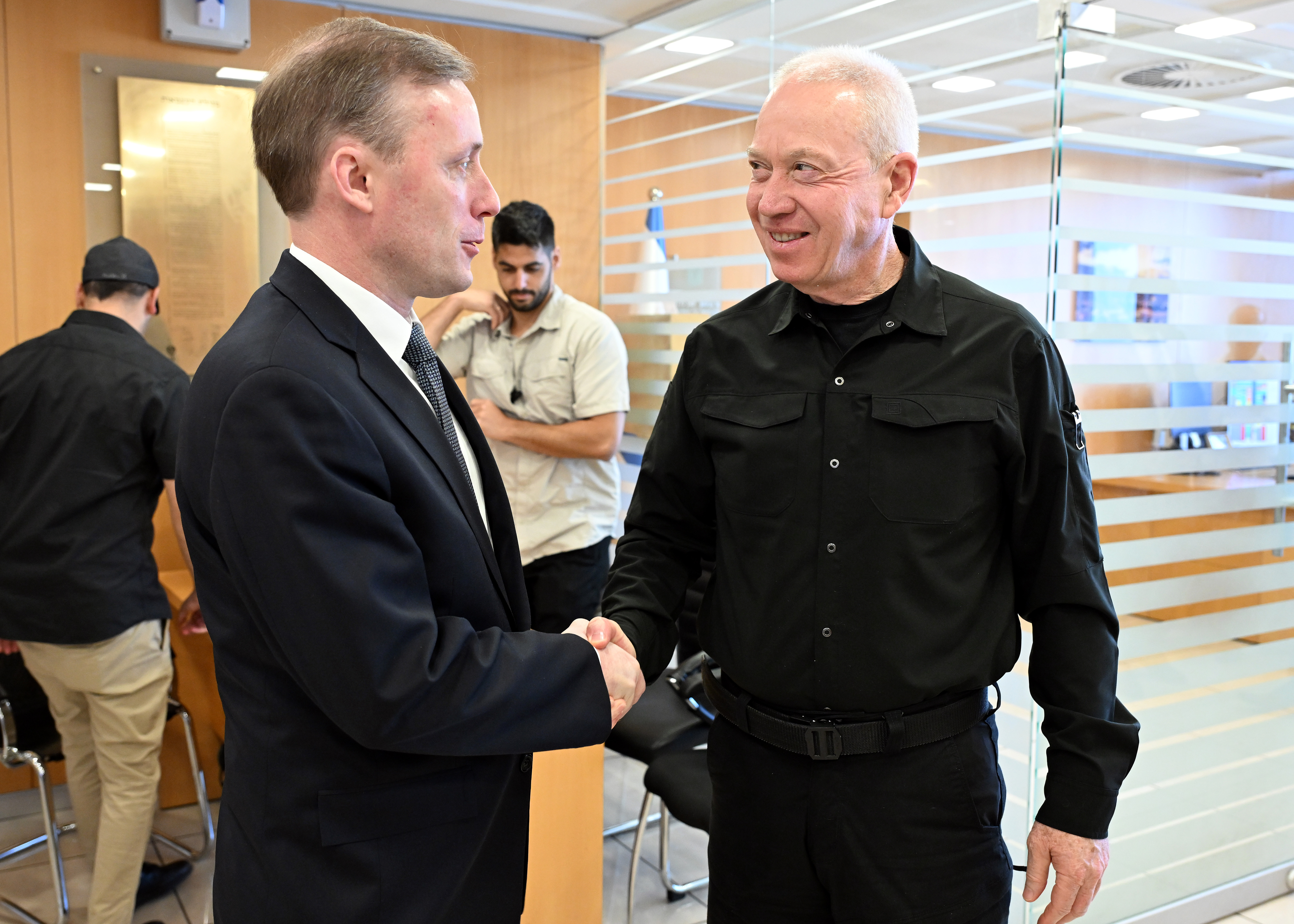
Gallant with Joe Biden's National Security Adviser Jake Sullivan in Israel, 20 May 2024

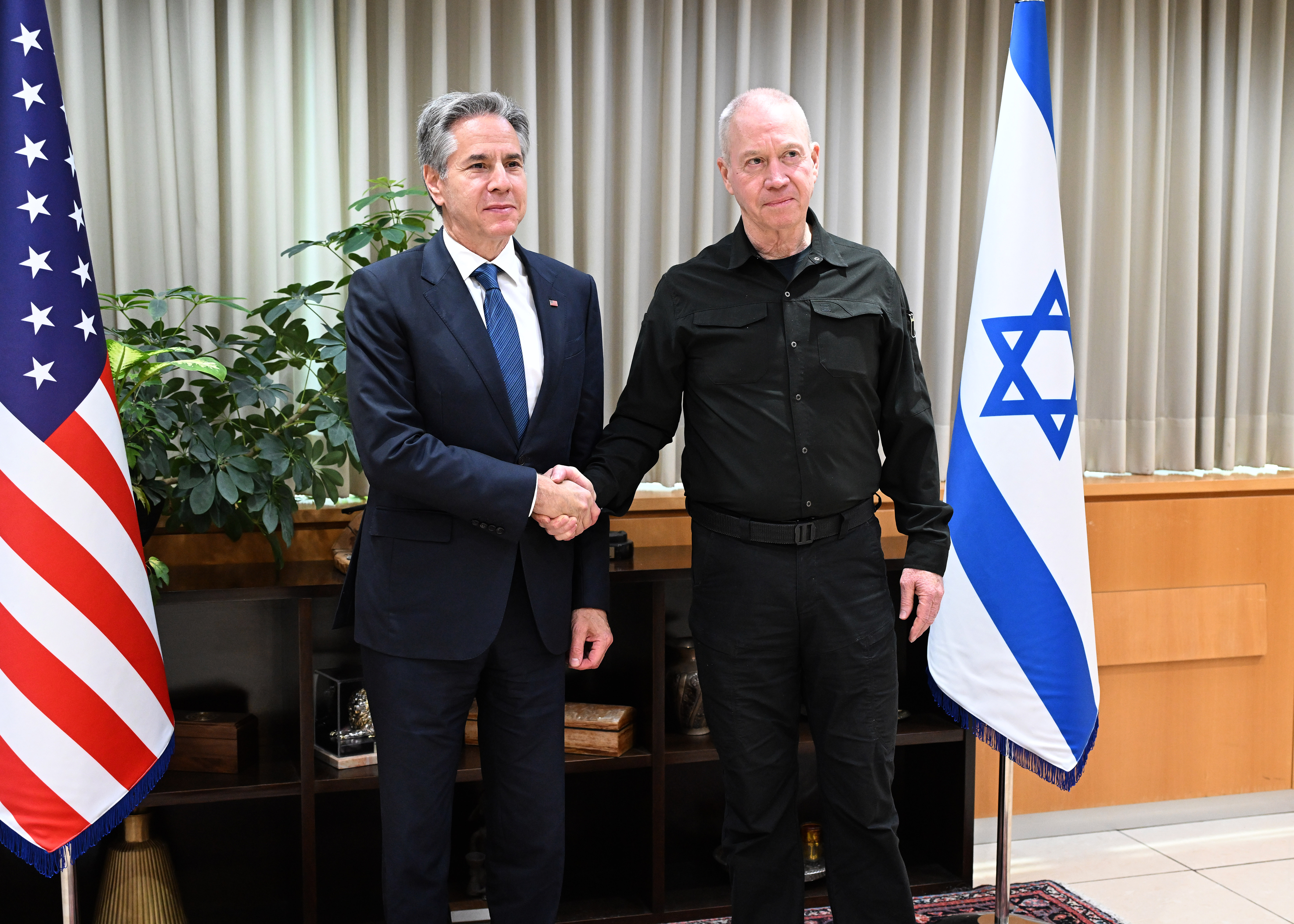
Gallant with US secretary of state Antony Blinken in Israel, 19 August 2024

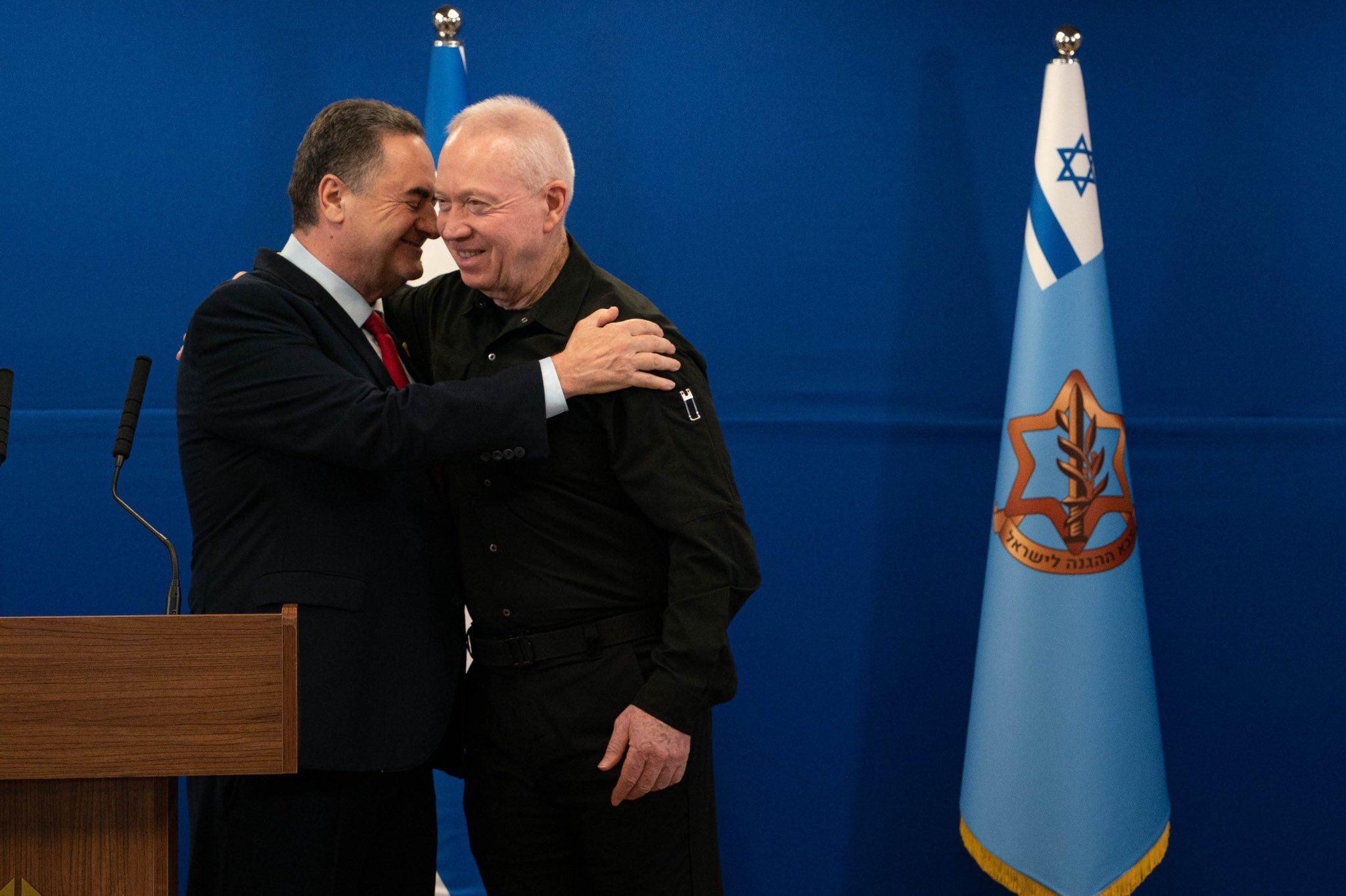
Gallant with Israel Katz on 8 November 2024
