= Haim Jelin =

Israeli politician

- חיים ילין
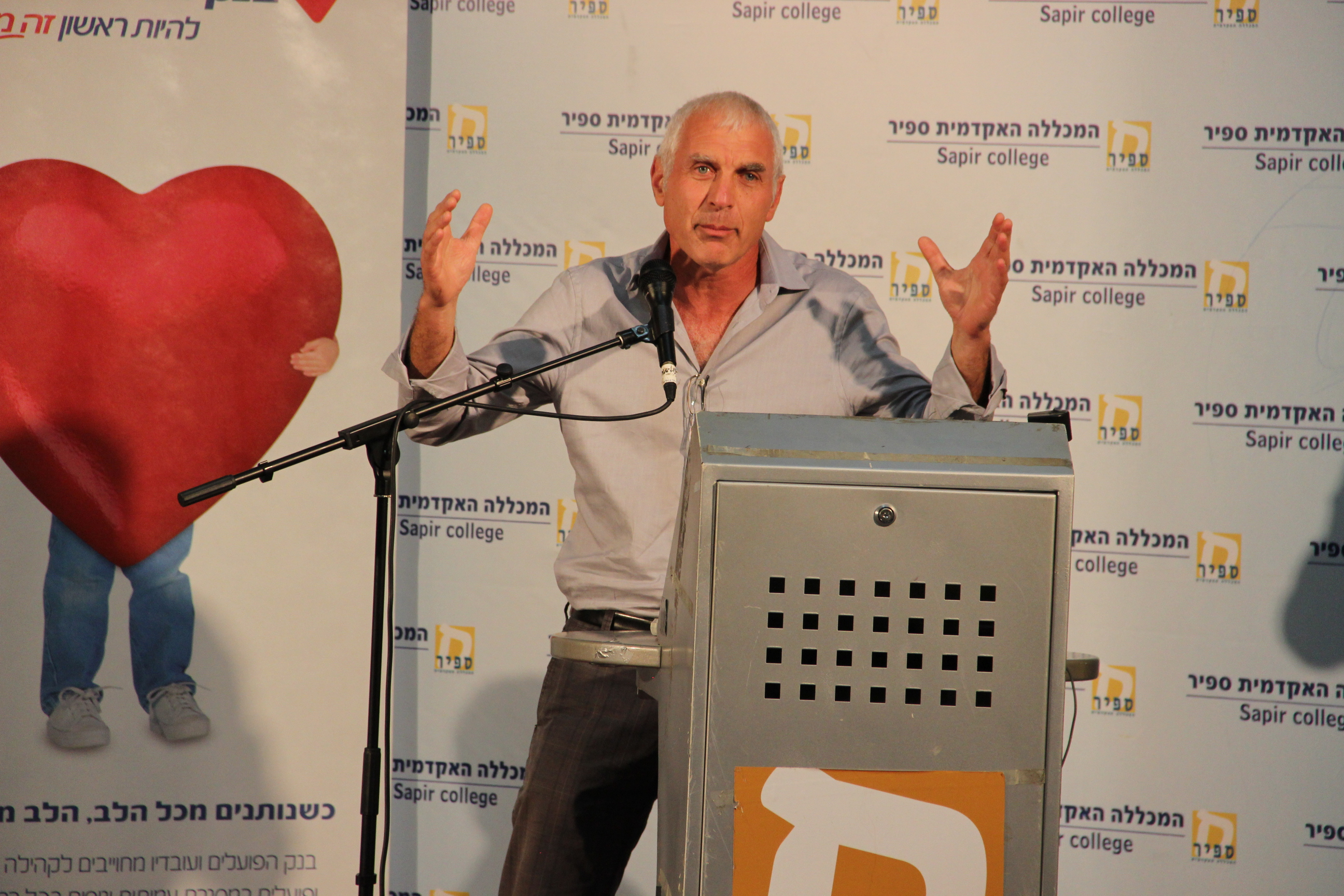

Faction represented in the Knesset
- 2015–2019: Yesh Atid

Personal details
- Born: 12 August 1958 (age 68) Buenos Aires, Argentina

Haim Jelin (Hebrew: חיים ילין; born 12 August 1958, Haim Yellin) is an Israeli politician. He served as a member of the Knesset for Yesh Atid from 2015 to 2019, having previously been head of Eshkol Regional Council from 2007 to 2015.

== Biography ==
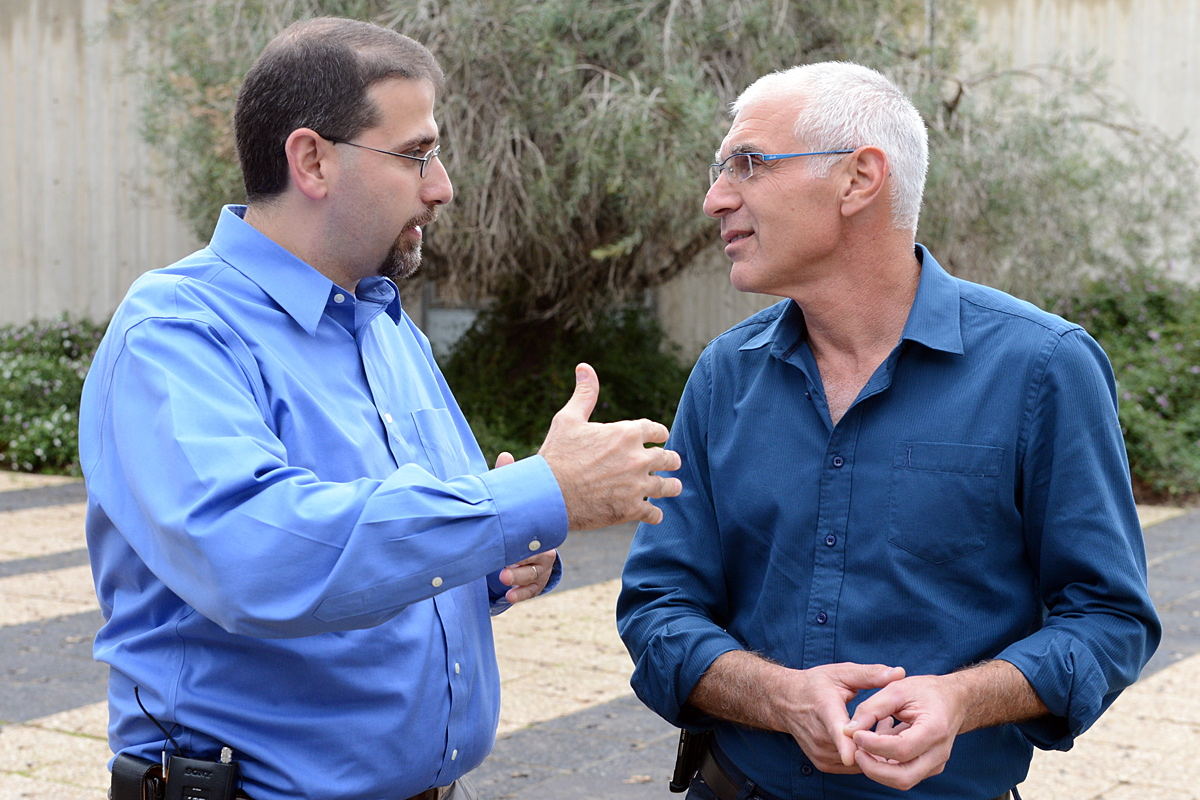
Jelin with Dan Shapiro

Jelin was born in Buenos Aires, Argentina, and immigrated to Israel at age 18. He served in the Israel Defense Forces as a lone soldier, instructing tank commanders. He studied economics and management at Sapir Academic College and Ben-Gurion University. Jelin is a member of kibbutz Be'eri.

Jelin is married to Ziva, an artist, art teacher, and curator of the gallery in Be'eri. They have four children.

== Political career ==
Jelin was elected head of the Eshkol Regional Council in 2007. The area, which borders the Gaza Strip, was heavily attacked by rockets during the 2014 Israel-Gaza conflict. Jelin expressed his skepticism and frustration at the government's plans for cease-fire during this time. He was placed seventh on the Yesh Atid list for the 2015 Knesset elections, and was elected to the Knesset when the party won 11 seats. After being elected, he had to give up his Argentine citizenship. He defected to the Labor Party in the build-up to the April 2019 elections and was placed tenth on its list. However, Labor won only six seats and did not return to the Knesset.
