= Osama Saadi =

Arab-Israeli politician

- اسامة سعدي
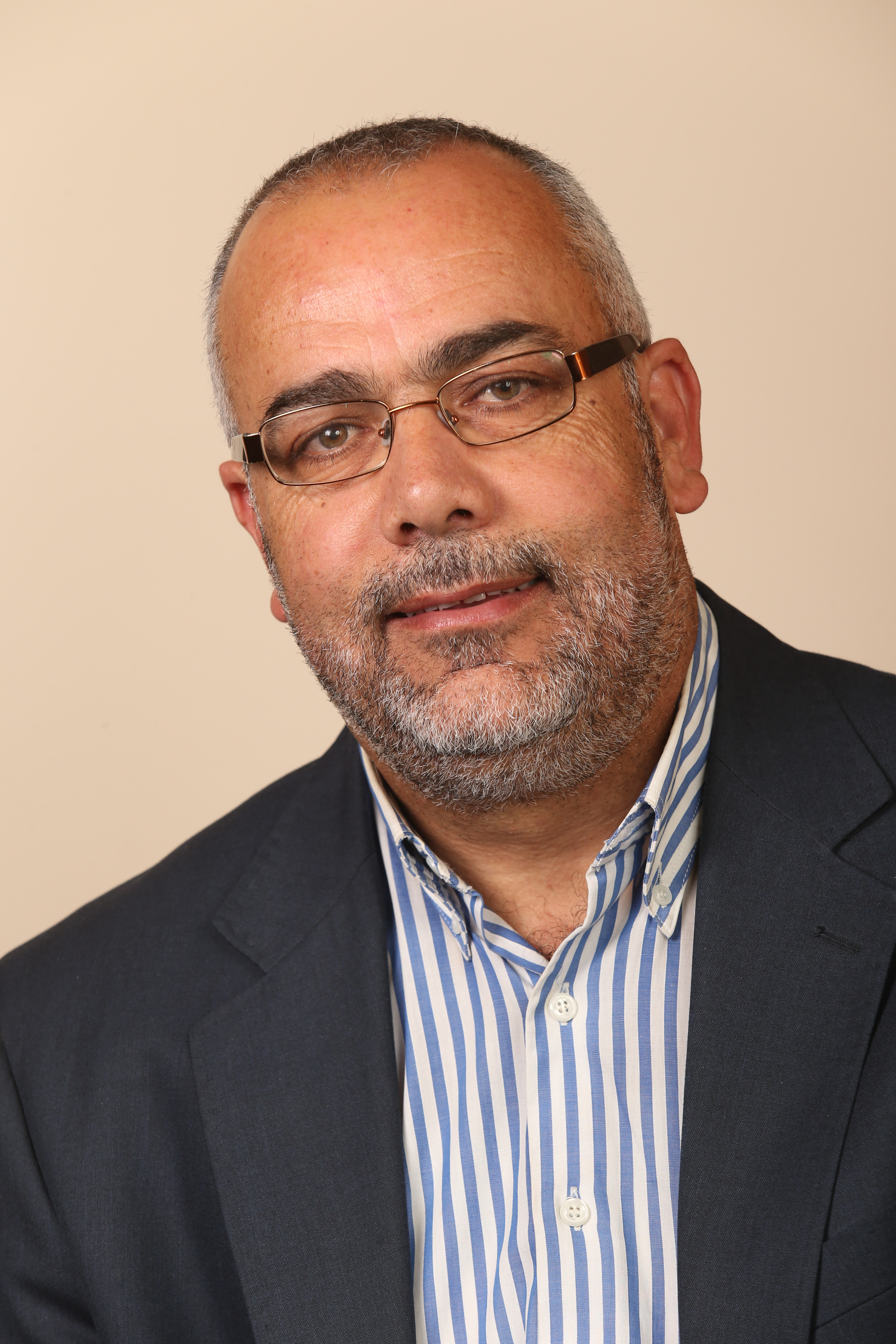

Faction represented in the Knesset
- 2015–2017: Joint List
- 2019: Ta'al
- 2019–2022: Joint List

Personal details
- Born: 1 January 1963 (age 63) Arraba, Israel

Osama Saadi (Arabic: اسامة سعدي, Hebrew: אוֹסָאמָה סַעֲדִי; born 1 January 1963) is an Israeli Arab lawyer and politician. He was a member of the Knesset for the Joint List.

== Biography ==
Saadi studied law at the Hebrew University of Jerusalem, where he was chair of the Arab Student Union. He worked as a lawyer, dealing with security prisoners and members of the Palestinian Legislative Council who were expelled from East Jerusalem.

He became secretary general of the Ta'al party after it was established in 1996 by his brother-in-law, Ahmad Tibi. He was second on the party's list for the 1996 Knesset elections, but it failed to win a seat. In the 2003 elections, he was in seventh place on the joint Hadash–Ta'al list, but it won only three seats.

Prior to the 2015 elections, he was placed 12th on the Joint List, an alliance of Hadash, Balad, Ta'al and the United Arab List. He was elected to the Knesset as the Joint List won 13 seats. He resigned from the Knesset on 20 September 2017, and was replaced by Ibrahim Hijazi, as part of a rotation agreement between the parties within the Joint List. Ta'al ran in an alliance with Hadash for the April 2019 Knesset elections, with Sa'adi in fourth place. He was returned to the Knesset as the alliance won six seats.

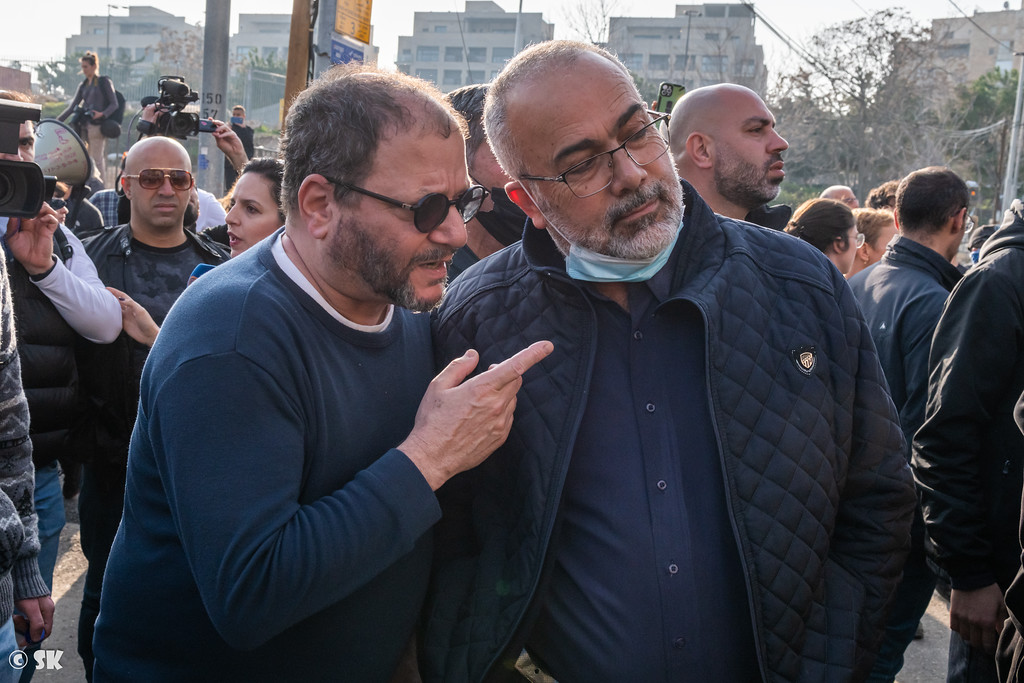
Osama Saadi and Ofer Cassif in demonstration against eviction of palestinian families from Sheikh Jarrah. February 2022

Saadi is married, with five children, and lives in Jerusalem.
