= Yinon Azulai =

Israeli politician

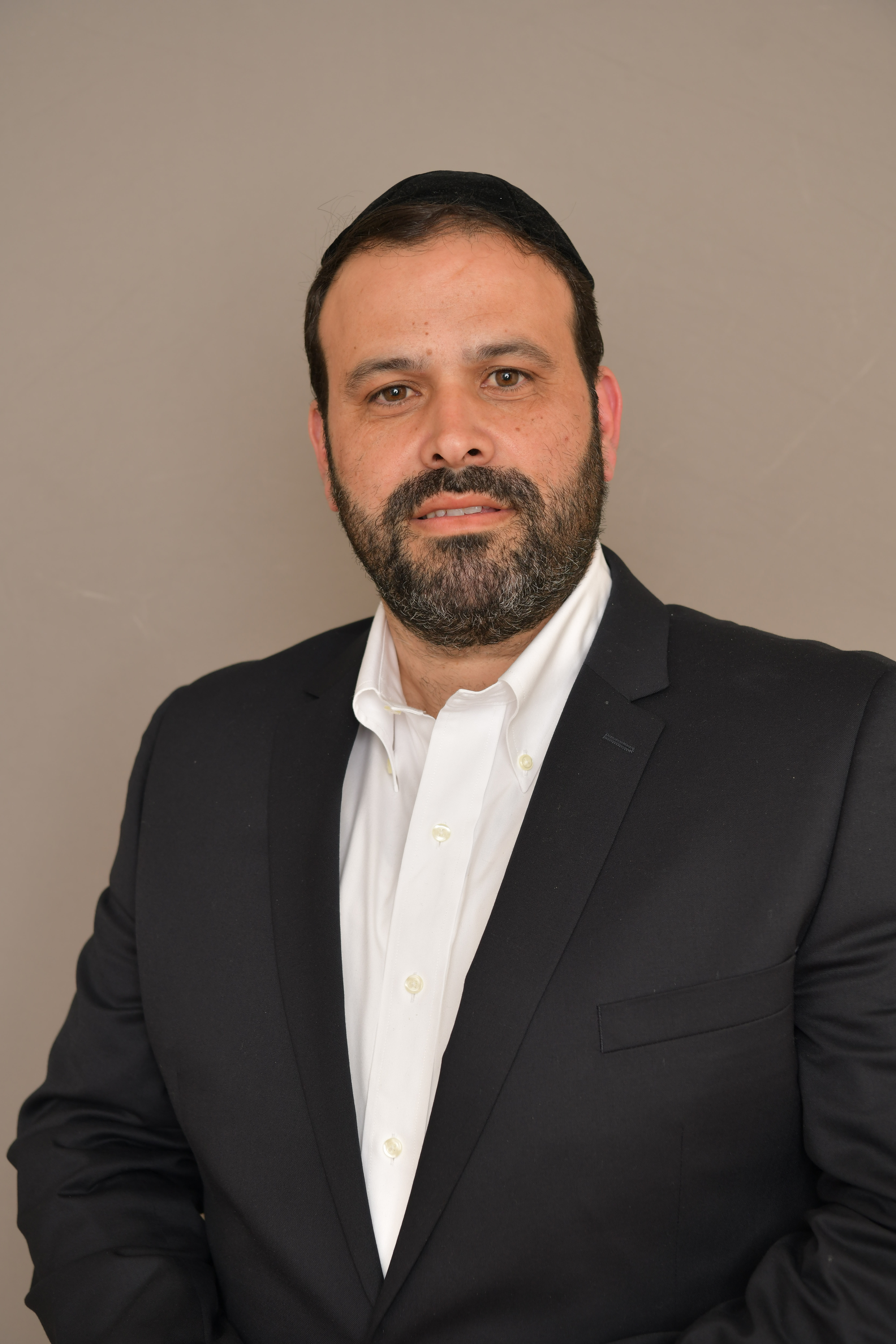
- Azulai in 2021

Faction represented in the Knesset
- 2018–: Shas

Personal details
- Born: 10 July 1979 (age 47) Israel

Yinon Azulai (Hebrew: יִנּוּן אָזוּלַאי; born 10 July 1979) is an Israeli politician. He is currently a member of the Knesset for Shas.

== Political career ==
Azulai was sixteenth on the Shas list for the 2015 Knesset elections, but failed to become a Knesset member when Shas won seven seats.

In March 2018 he entered the Knesset as a replacement for his father, Minister of Religious Services David Azulai, who had resigned from the Knesset under the Norwegian Law.

After a minor earthquake occurred in the Haifa June 2018, Azulai claimed that the earthquake came as a result of Reform and Conservative Jews efforts to build a pluralistic prayer area at the Western Wall, including a new area for women. Azulai further stated that Jews who supported such efforts were not actual Jews.
