= Yitzhak Cohen =

Israeli politician (born 1951)

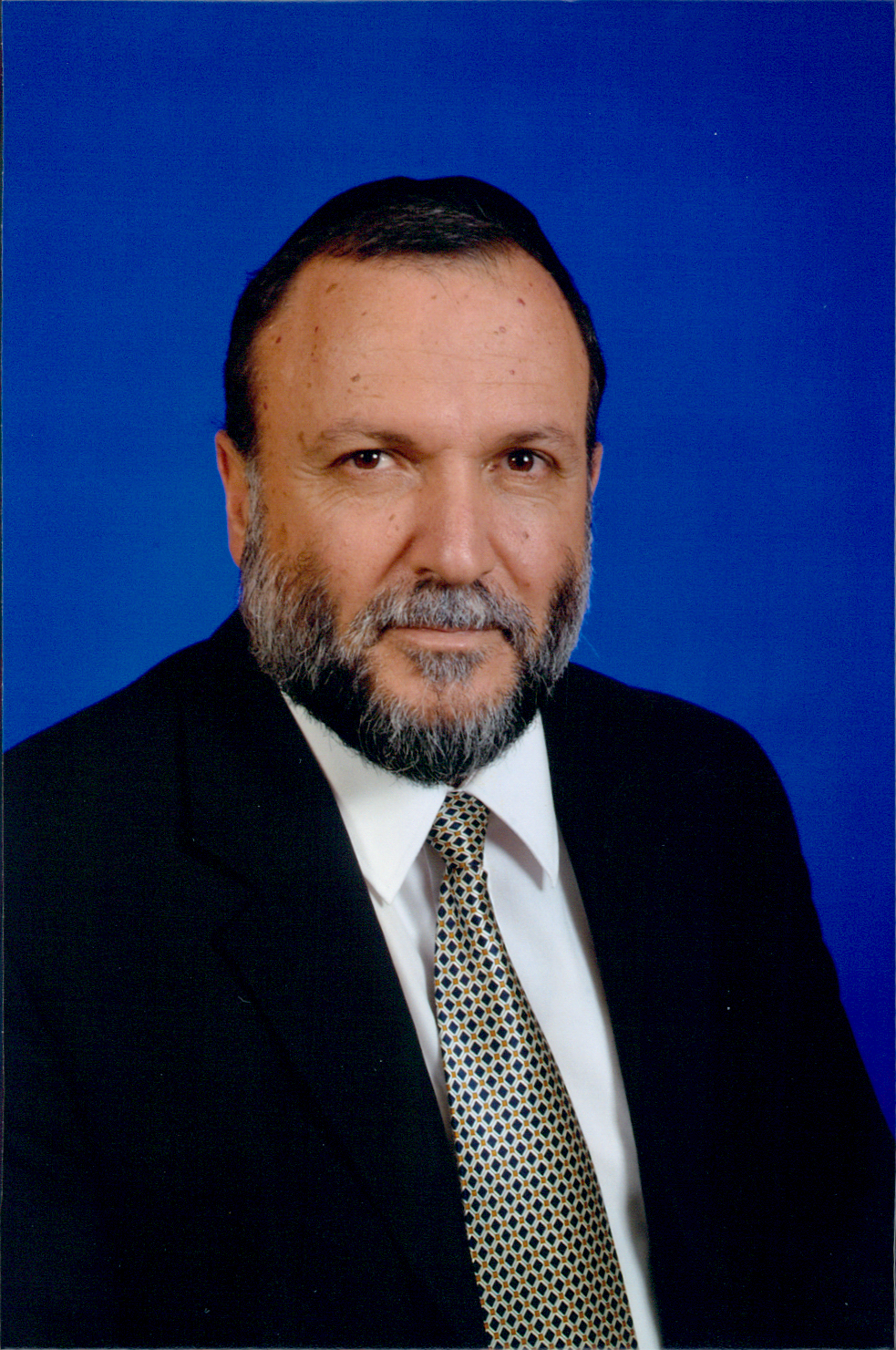

Ministerial roles
- 1999–2000: Minister of Religious Services
- 2006–2008: Minister without Portfolio
- 2008–2009: Minister of Religious Services
- 2015–2020: Deputy Minister of Finance
- 2020: Ministry of Construction
- 2020: Minister in the Finance Ministry

Faction represented in the Knesset
- 1996–2018: Shas
- 2019–2021: Shas

Personal details
- Born: 2 December 1951 (age 74) Ashkelon, Israel

Rabbi Yitzhak Cohen (Hebrew: יצחק כהן; born 2 October 1951) is an Israeli politician who served as a member of the Knesset for Shas in two spells between 1996 and 2020. He also held several ministerial portfolios.

== Biography ==
Born in Ashkelon, Cohen served on the city's council, and was its former deputy mayor.

He served as Secretary-General of Shas' educational institution (El HaMa'ayan). He was first elected to Knesset in 1996. In his time in Knesset, he has served on the Finance Committee, Labor and Welfare Committee, Committee on Foreign Workers, Foreign Affairs & Defense Committee, Joint Committee for the Defense Budget, Special Committee for Discussion of the Security Service Law Substitute Member, Constitution, Law and Justice Committee, and the House Committee. He has also been a member of the Knesset Forum on the Middle East lobby, and is currently a member of the Lobby for Ethiopian Immigrants.

He became the Minister of Religious Affairs in July 1999, and resigned a year later. He served as the Deputy Minister of Finance from 2001 to 2003. In 2006, he was appointed the Minister without Portfolio, and is in charge of religious councils, a role converted to Religious Services Minister in January 2008.

In 2007, he criticized the US report that Iran had stopped its nuclear program in 2003. He said the report was "ordered by someone who wants dialogue with Tehran". He compared the event to when the US got intelligence in World War Two that said there were trains going to concentration camps, and they said they were being used for industrial purposes. In 2009, in an interview with Der Spiegel, Cohen threatened to suspend relations with the Vatican, following the lifting of the excommunication of controversial bishop Richard Williamson.

He retained his seat in the 2009 elections, having been placed third on the Shas list. He lost his cabinet portfolio, instead becoming Deputy Finance Minister. He was re-elected again in 2013, but Shas were excluded from the government. After being re-elected for a sixth time in 2015, he regained the post of Deputy Minister of Finance in the new government. He gave up his Knesset seat in February 2018 under the Norwegian Law, and was replaced by Danny Saida. In January 2020 he was nominated as the Minister of Construction and Housing, but he withdrew his nomination after it was put on hold. After being re-elected in the March 2020 elections, he was appointed Ministry of Construction and Minister in the Finance Ministry in October 2020. In November 2020, he resigned from his ministerial positions. On 1 February 2021 Cohen announced he was retiring from politics and would not contest the 2021 Knesset elections.

== Personal life ==
Cohen resides in Ashkelon, and is married, with ten children. He was educated at a Talmudic College. He can speak Hebrew, English, and Arabic.
