= Wael Younis =

Israeli Arab politician

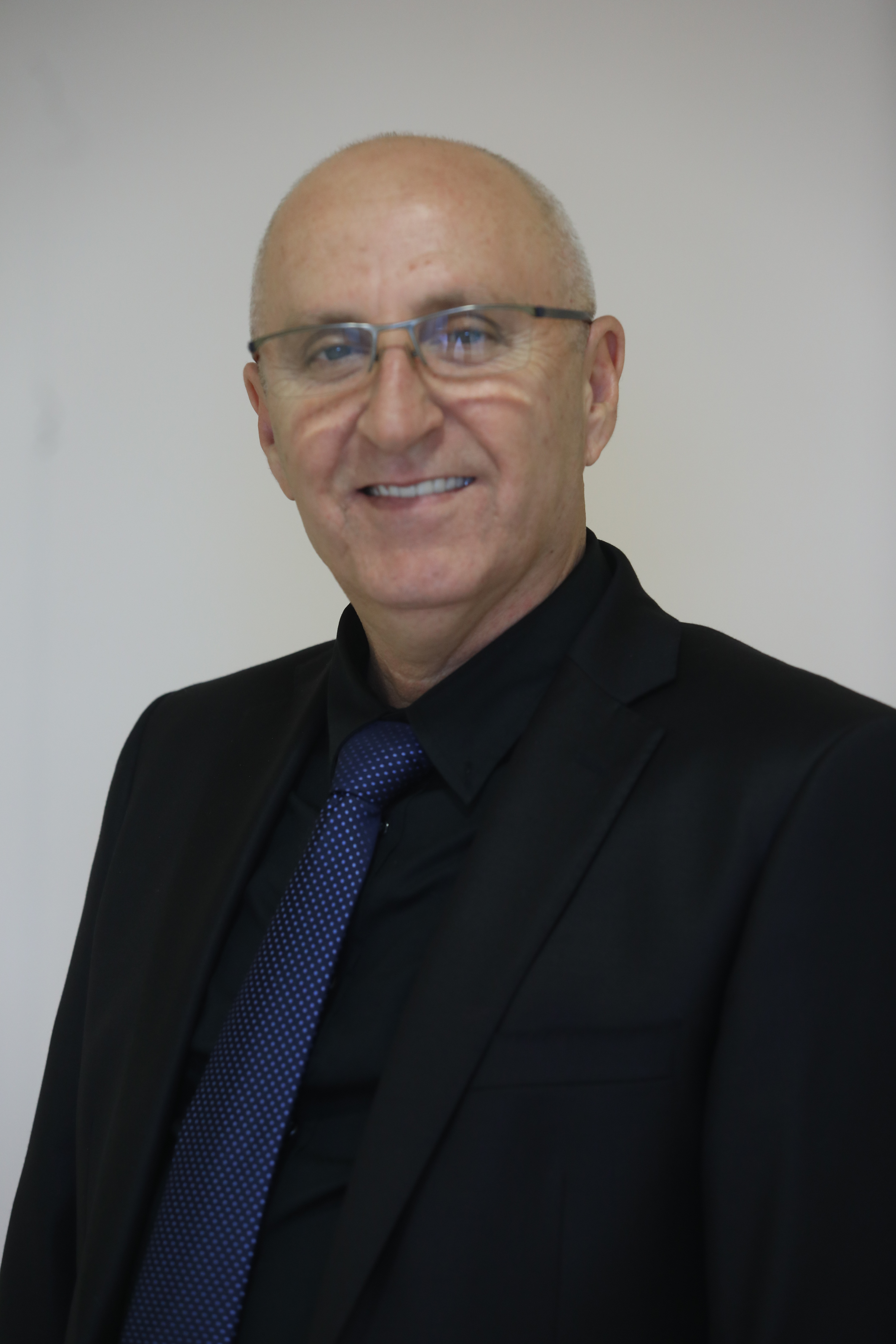
- Younis in 2018

Faction represented in the Knesset
- 2018: Joint List

Personal details
- Born: 31 January 1963 (age 63) Ar'ara, Israel

Wael Younis (Arabic: وائل يونس, Hebrew: ואאל יונס; born 31 January 1963) is an Israeli Arab politician who served as a member of the Knesset for the Joint List in 2018.

== Biography ==
Younis was born in Ar'ara and has a bachelor's degree in nursing.

A member of Ta'al, Younis was placed 18th on the Joint List (an alliance of the four main Arab parties) prior to the 2015 Knesset elections. Although the party won only 13 seats, Younis entered the Knesset on 9 February 2018 as a replacement for Youssef Atauna as part of a rotation agreement within the alliance. However, in August 2018 he resigned from the Knesset and was replaced by Niven Abu Rahmoun as part of the rotation agreement.
