= Ibrahim Hijazi =

Israeli Arab politician (born 1977)

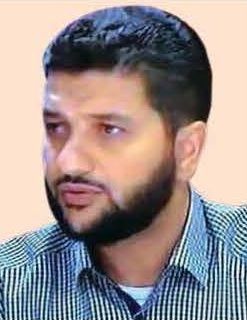
- Hijazi in 2017

Faction represented in the Knesset
- 2017: Joint List

Personal details
- Born: 22 July 1977 (age 48); Nazareth, Israel

Ibrahim Hijazi (Arabic: ابراهيم حجازي, Hebrew: אבראהים חג'אזי; born 22 July 1977) is an Israeli Arab politician who briefly served as a member of the Knesset for the Joint List in 2017.

== Background ==
Hijazi was born in Nazareth. He studied at the University of Haifa, completing a bachelor's degree in psychology and went on to earn a master's degree in educational psychology at Ben-Gurion University of the Negev. He also gained a Certificate in Organizational Development from Bar-Ilan University.

A member of the Southern Branch of the Islamic Movement and the United Arab List, Hijazi was placed sixteenth on the list of the Joint List (an alliance of predominantly Arab parties) for the 2015 Knesset elections. Although the alliance won only 13 seats, Hijazi entered the Knesset on 20 September 2017 as a replacement for Osama Saadi as part of a rotation agreement between the parties in the alliance. However, he resigned from the Knesset in October 2017 and was replaced by Youssef Atauna on 25 October.
