= Yigal Guetta =

Israeli politician

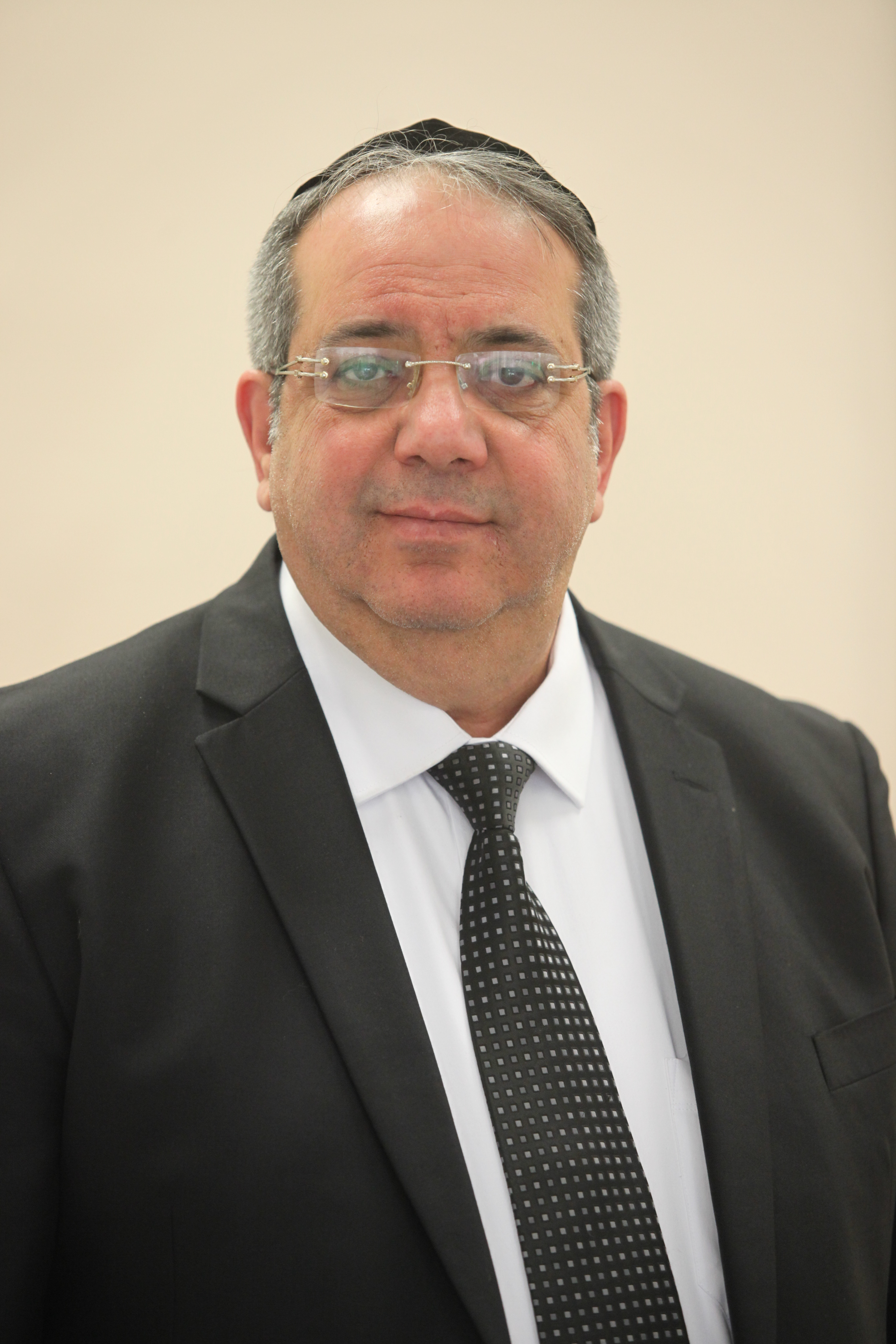
- Guetta in 2016

Faction represented in the Knesset
- 2016–2017: Shas

Personal details
- Born: 18 March 1966 (age 60) Kiryat Shmona, Israel

Nissan Yigal Guetta (Hebrew: ניסן יגאל גואטה; born 18 March 1966) is an Israeli politician who served as a member of the Knesset for Shas between 2016 and 2017.

== Early life ==
Guetta was born and raised in Kiryat Shmona. His brother and sister-in-law were killed in the Kiryat Shmona massacre in 1974 when he was 8 years old. He carried out his IDF national service in the Nahal Brigade. He was educated at Bais Hatalmud in Jerusalem, and gained a master's degree in business and public administration from Ono Academic College.

== Municipal politics ==
In 2003 he was elected to Bnei Brak City Council on the Shas list, becoming responsible for its finance portfolio. In 2008, he was appointed CEO of the municipality of El'ad. In 2010, after alleging corruption on the part of the mayor, he was fired. He returned to work, however, after the State Comptroller Micha Lindenstrauss issued a temporary decree. Lindenstrauss ordered Guetta to leave his position six months later, once the decree expired.

== Knesset member ==
Guetta was placed tenth on the Shas list for the 2015 Knesset elections, but failed to become a Knesset member when Shas won seven seats. In January 2016, he entered the Knesset after Deputy Minister of the Interior Meshulam Nahari resigned as an MK under the Norwegian Law. In September 2017, Guetta revealed on Army Radio that he had attended the same-sex marriage ceremony of his nephew two years earlier. Later that month, he resigned from the Knesset under pressure from rabbis. Guetta did receive support from several Shas MKs, as well as MKs from other parties including Yair Lapid and Merav Michaeli. His seat was taken by Danny Saida.

== Broadcasting career ==
In January 2018, he began presenting a radio show on the Israel Broadcasting Corporation. In May 2019, he began starring in an investigative television series with a focus on socio-economic inequality, also on the Israel Broadcasting Corporation, titled Citizen Guetta.

== Personal life ==
Guetta is married, with three children. His eldest daughter, Simcha Guetta, is a model and reality television star. He lives in the Pardes Katz neighbourhood of Bnei Brak.
