= Meshulam Nahari =

Israeli politician (born 1951)

- מְשׁוּלָּם נָהָרִי
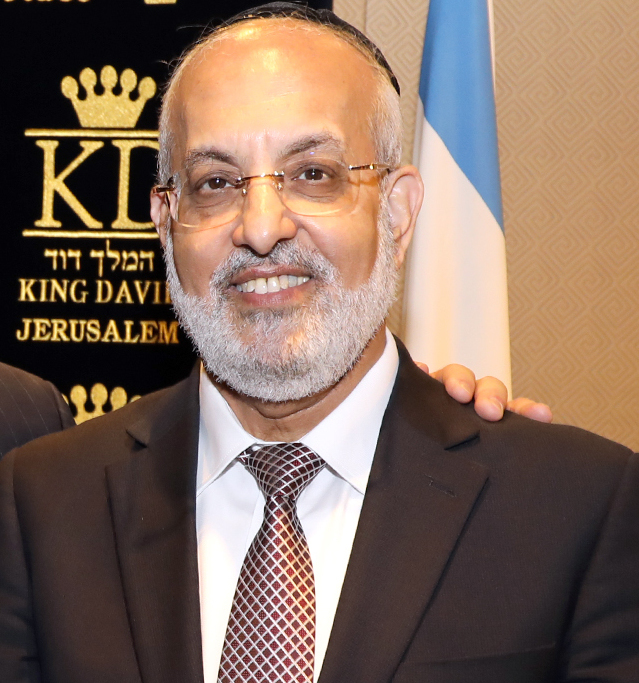

Ministerial roles
- 2006–2013: Minister without Portfolio

Faction represented in the Knesset
- 1999–2016: Shas
- 2017–2021: Shas

Personal details
- Born: 7 May 1951 (age 75) Jerusalem, Israel

Rabbi Meshulam Nahari (Hebrew: מְשׁוּלָּם נָהָרִי; born 7 May 1951) is an Israeli politician. He served as a member of the Knesset for Shas in two spells between 1999 and 2021.

== Biography ==
Meshullam Nahari was born in Jerusalem to Yemenite Jewish immigrant parents, and studied in a yeshiva. After his national service, he was ordained as a rabbi, and also gained a BA from Lifschitz Teaching College. After graduating, he went on to become a headteacher. Nahari is married, with five children, and lives in Jerusalem.

== Public service ==
Nahari served as a consultant to the Deputy Minister of Education and was a member of the Education Ministry directorate. Later he was appointed Director of the ministry's Haredi Culture Department.

== Political career ==
Nahari was first elected to the Knesset in the 1999 elections, and served as Deputy Minister of Education under both Ehud Barak and Ariel Sharon.

He retained his seat in both the 2003 and 2006 elections, and was made a Minister without Portfolio in Ehud Olmert's government. In September 2006, he was given a position in the Finance Ministry, with responsibilities for education and welfare. After his appointment, he proposed a bill which would require local authorities to fund unrecognised ultra-Orthodox schools, which was passed despite opposition from the Attorney General and the Education Minister Yuli Tamir.

Nahari retained his seat again in the 2009 elections, having been placed fifth on the Shas list, and was appointed a Minister without Portfolio again. He was re-elected again in 2013, but Shas were excluded from the coalition government. After another re-election in 2015, he was appointed Deputy Minister of Welfare and Social Services in the new government formed in May 2015. In January 2016, he was moved to the Deputy Minister of the Interior portfolio. Later in the month, he resigned from the Knesset to allow Yigal Guetta to become an MK, but remained a deputy minister under the Norwegian Law. Nahari resigned from his position shortly after Guetta's resignation from the Knesset, and returned on 20 September 2017, to his place in the Knesset in accordance to the Norwegian Law, replacing Danny Saida. A week later he was reinstated as deputy minister.

Nahari was re-elected in April and September of 2019, as well as in 2020. Nahari stood down in the 2021 election at the behest of Moetzet Chachmei HaTorah, and left the Knesset at the end of its term.
