= 2015 Israeli legislative election =

- 17 March 2015
- All 120 seats in the Knesset; 61 seats needed for a majority
- Turnout: 72.34% (▲4.57pp)
Party	Leader	Vote %	Seats	+/–
Likud	Benjamin Netanyahu	23.40	30	+12
Zionist Union	Isaac Herzog	18.67	24	+3
Joint List	Ayman Odeh	10.54	13	+2
Yesh Atid	Yair Lapid	8.81	11	−8
Kulanu	Moshe Kahlon	7.49	10	New
Jewish Home	Naftali Bennett	6.74	8	−4
Shas	Aryeh Deri	5.73	7	−4
Yisrael Beiteinu	Avigdor Lieberman	5.11	6	−7
UTJ	Yaakov Litzman	5.03	6	−1
Meretz	Zehava Gal-On	3.93	5	−1
This lists parties that won seats. See the complete results below.
Prime Minister before	Prime Minister after
Benjamin Netanyahu; Likud (33rd)	Benjamin Netanyahu; Likud (34th)

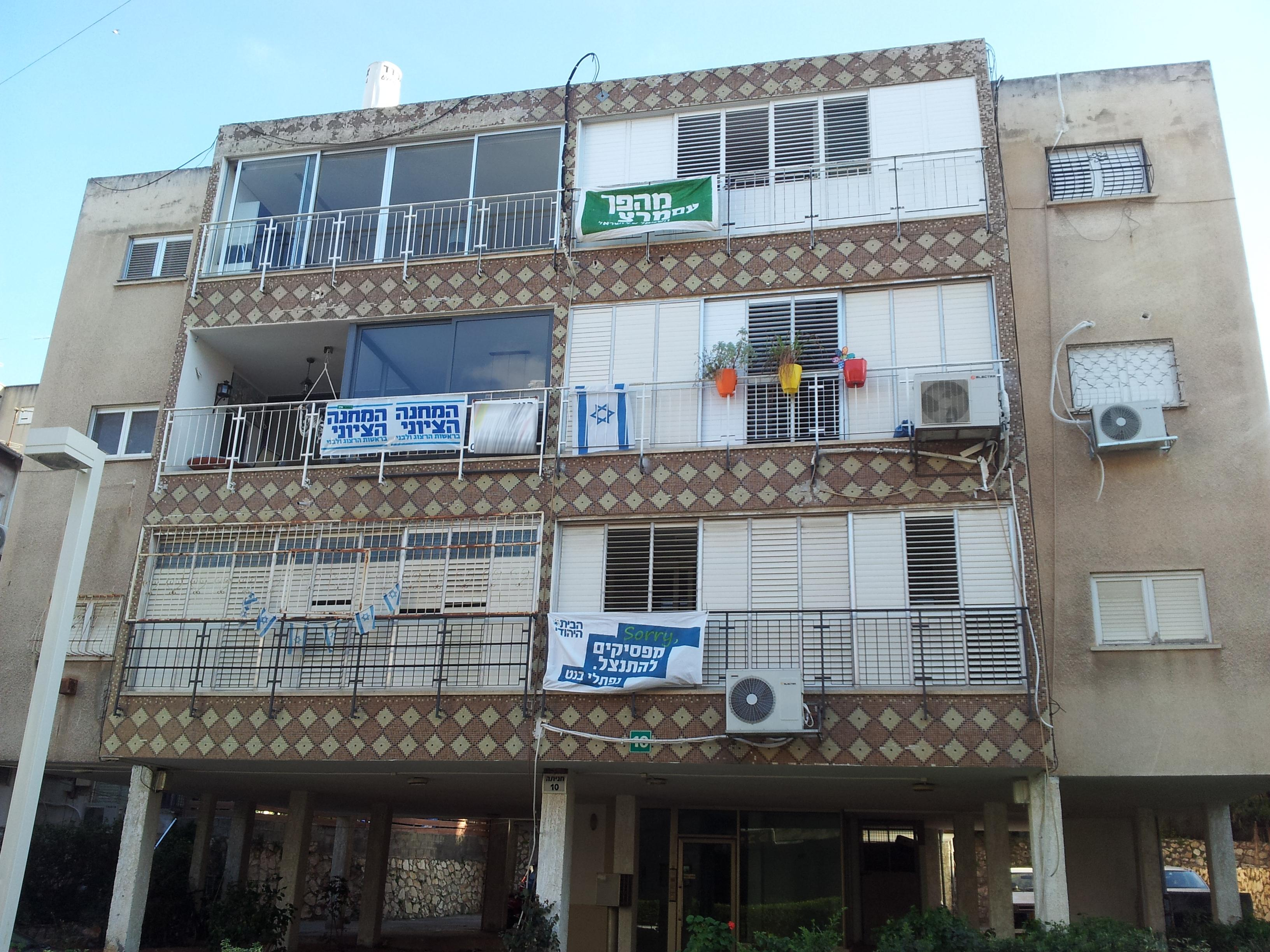
Various party banners at a house in Givatayim

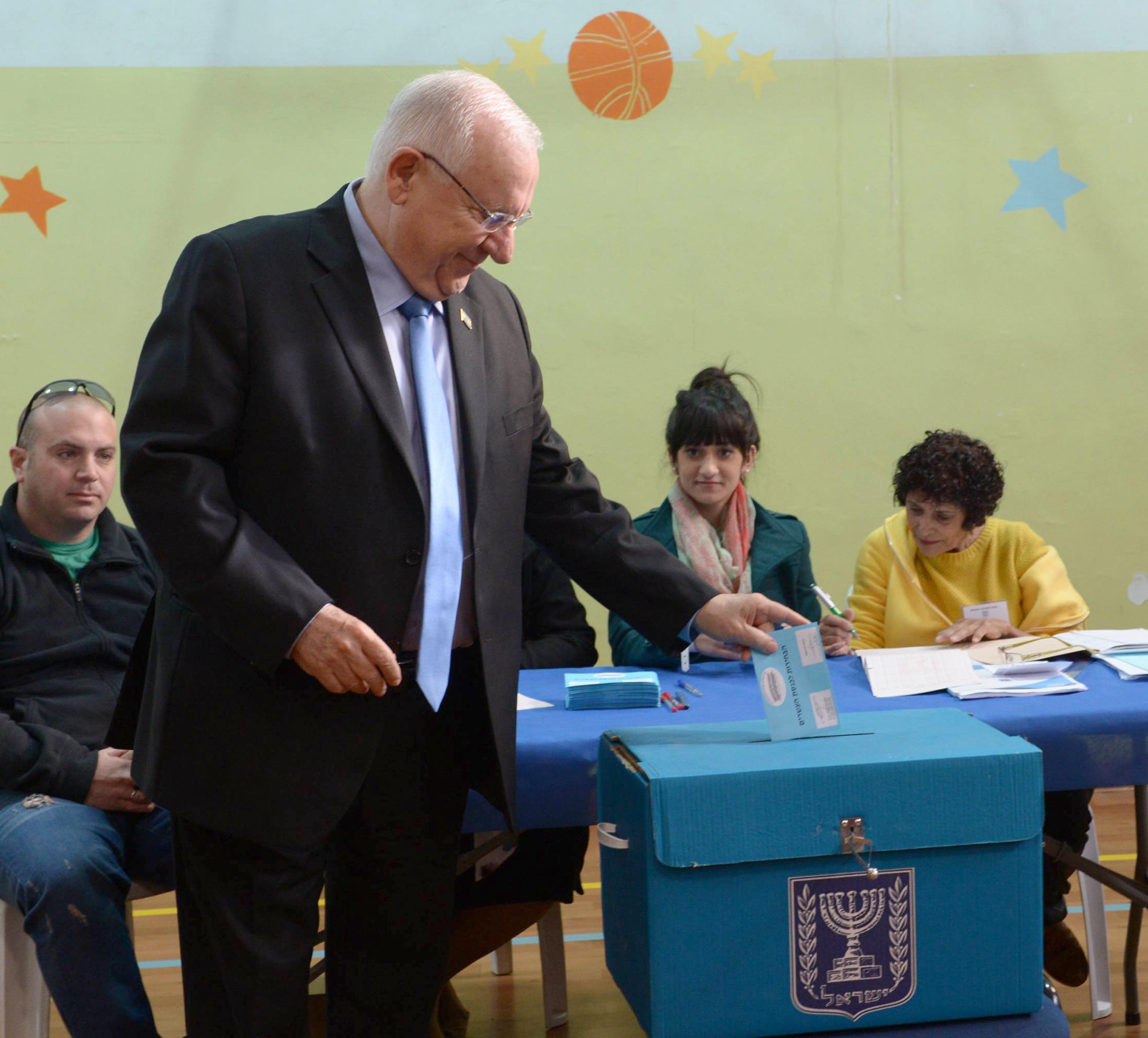
President Reuven Rivlin casts his vote in Jerusalem

Early legislative elections were held in Israel on 17 March 2015 to elect the 120 members of the twentieth Knesset. Disagreements within the governing coalition, particularly over the budget and a "Jewish state" proposal, led to the dissolution of the government in December 2014. The Labor Party and Hatnuah formed a coalition, called Zionist Union, with the hope of defeating the Likud party, which had led the previous governing coalition along with Yisrael Beiteinu, Yesh Atid, The Jewish Home, and Hatnuah.

The incumbent prime minister, Benjamin Netanyahu of Likud, declared victory in the election, with Likud picking up the highest number of votes. President Reuven Rivlin granted Netanyahu an extension until 6 May 2015 to build a coalition when one had not been finalized in the first four weeks of negotiations. He formed a coalition government within two hours of the midnight 6 May deadline. His Likud party formed the coalition with the Jewish Home, United Torah Judaism, Kulanu, and Shas, with the bare minimum 61 seats. Yisrael Beiteinu later joined the coalition in May 2016.

== Background ==
During late November and early December 2014, there were serious disagreements between parties in the governing coalition, particularly over the budget and a "Jewish state" proposal. On 2 December, Likud announced it would support a dissolution bill, with a vote scheduled for 8 December. Hours later, Prime Minister Benjamin Netanyahu fired Tzipi Livni and Yair Lapid from their cabinet portfolios. In the first reading of the dissolution bill on 3 December, it was approved by a vote of 84–0, with one abstention. The second and third readings were held on 8 December, with the third reading passing with a vote of 93–0.

The final election turnout was 72.3%, 4.6% higher than in the previous election and the highest since the 1999 elections, which saw a 78.7% turnout.

Initially, exit polls reported a virtual tie between the Likud and the Zionist Union, a coalition headed by Leader of the Opposition Isaac Herzog and former justice minister Tzipi Livni. Both Netanyahu and Herzog began attempts to build a coalition in preparation for a possible government, with Herzog calling Netanyahu's statement "premature". However, when the counting of the votes on 18 March 2015 revealed a significant lead for Likud, Herzog acknowledged that "the only realistic option" was to remain in the opposition. He stated in a 19 March 2015 post-election interview that he still hopes to be the prime minister.

== Date ==
During the meeting held with Speaker Yuli-Yoel Edelstein on setting the date of the election, Likud and the Jewish Home favoured 10 March, the Labor Party requested 17 March, Shas and United Torah Judaism preferred 24 March, whilst the Arab parties requested that the elections be delayed until May. The date was ultimately set for 17 March.

== Calendar ==
- 29 January 2015 – Deadline for parties to submit final Knesset candidate lists to the Central Elections Commission
- 5 March 2015 – Election Day for members of Israeli diplomatic missions – Israeli diplomatic staff, their spouses, and Jewish Agency representatives vote, with ballot boxes set up in 96 Israeli diplomatic missions worldwide.
- 13 March 2015 – Deadline for publishing election polls and predictions
- 15 March 2015 – Election day for serving soldiers. 668 ballot boxes set up on military bases, and mobile polling stations are deployed to travel between remote army posts. Serving soldiers may vote from this day to the end of the elections.
- 16 March 2015 – Starting from 19:00 campaigning using assemblies, meetings, speakers, and media is prohibited.
- 17 March 2015 – Election Day. Most polling stations for the general public opened at 7:00 AM, although some polling stations in rural communities, hospitals, and prisons opened an hour later. Some 10,372 polling stations were set up, including 56 ballot boxes in prisons and 255 ballot boxes in hospitals. Polls in prisons closed at 9:20 PM. Polling stations open to the general public closed at 10:00 PM. Hospital staff and emergency room patients who were not able to vote while polling stations were open were issued special documents allowing them to vote after 10:00 PM.

== Electoral system ==
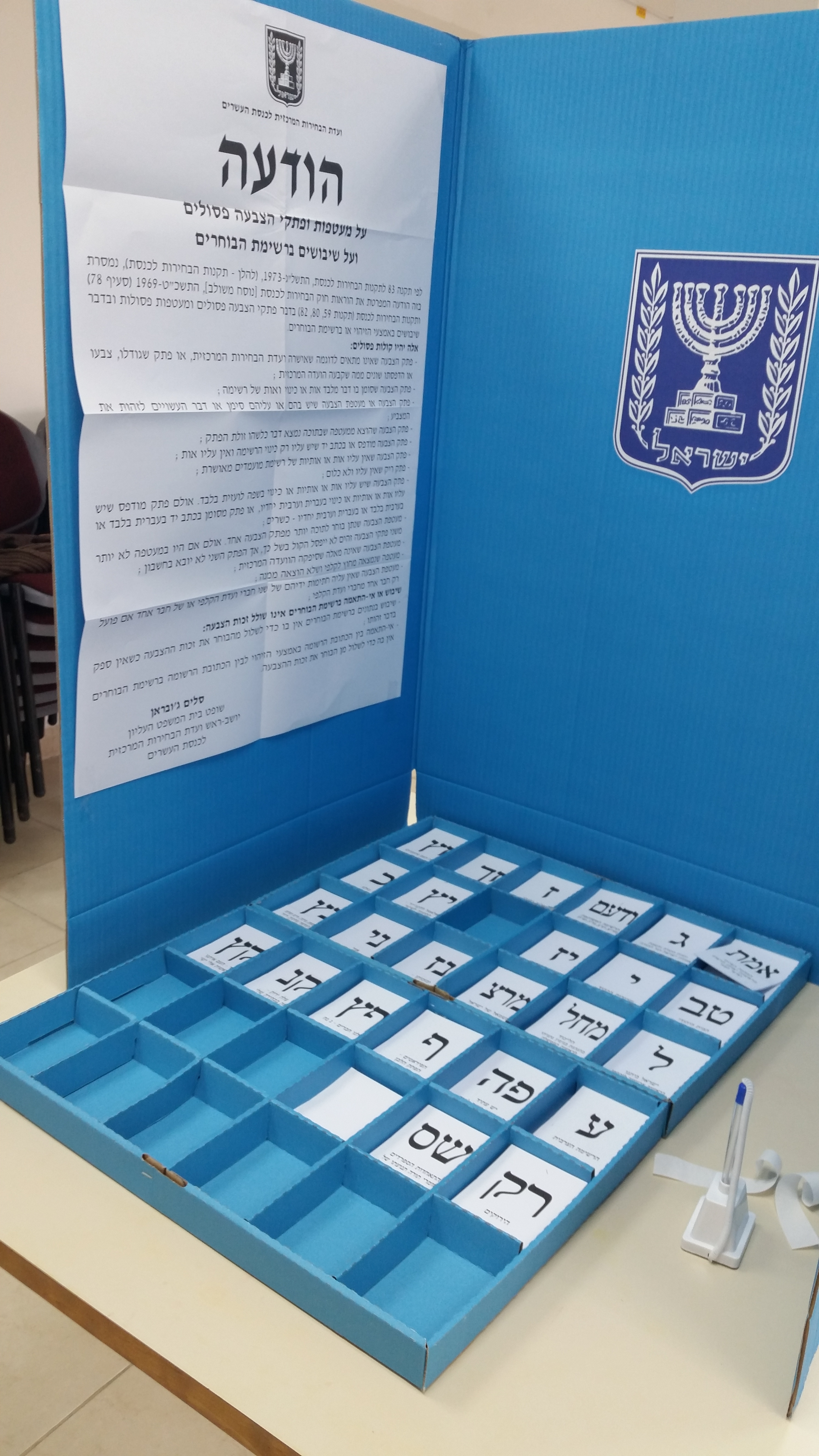
Israeli polling booth

The 120 seats in the Knesset are elected by proportional representation in a single nationwide constituency. The electoral threshold for the 2013 elections was 2%, but on 11 March 2014, the Knesset voted to raise the threshold to 3.25%. The vote was boycotted by the opposition. In almost all cases, this is equivalent to a minimum party size of four seats, but on rare occasions, a party can end up with three.

=== Joint electoral lists ===
Continuing their long-standing alliance, Degel HaTorah and Agudat Israel ran on a joint electoral list named United Torah Judaism.

In December 2014, the Labor Party and Hatnuah agreed to form a joint electoral list named Zionist Union.

The new Yachad party and Otzma Yehudit agreed on a joint electoral list.

Following the raising of the electoral threshold, Balad, Hadash, the southern branch of the Islamic Movement, Ta'al, and the United Arab List agreed in January 2015 to form a joint electoral list named Joint List.

=== Surplus-vote agreements ===
Two parties could make a surplus-vote agreement so that they were considered to be running on a joint list when leftover seats were distributed. The Bader–Ofer method favors larger lists, meaning that a joint list is more likely to receive leftover seats than each list would individually. If such a joint list were to receive a leftover seat, the Bader–Ofer method would be applied a second time to determine which of the parties that make up the joint list would receive it. The following agreements were signed by parties prior to the election:

- Likud and the Jewish Home
- Yisrael Beiteinu and Kulanu
- Zionist Union and Meretz
- Shas and United Torah Judaism

== Parliament factions ==
The table below lists the parliamentary factions represented in the 19th Knesset.

Name	Ideology	Symbol	Leader	2013 result		Seats at 2014 dissolution
Name	Ideology	Symbol	Leader	Votes (%)	Seats	Seats at 2014 dissolution
Likud	National liberalism Conservatism	מחל	Benjamin Netanyahu	23.34% (Note: Likud and Yisrael Beiteinu ran as a joint list called Likud Yisrael Beiteinu.)	20 / 120	18 / 120
Yisrael Beiteinu	Right-wing nationalism Secularism	ל	Avigdor Lieberman	23.34%	11 / 120	13 / 120
Yesh Atid	Liberalism	פה	Yair Lapid	14.33%	19 / 120	19 / 120
Labor	Social democracy	אמת	Isaac Herzog	11.39%	15 / 120	15 / 120
The Jewish Home	Religious Zionism; National conservatism	טב	Naftali Bennett	9.12%	12 / 120	12 / 120
Shas	Religious conservatism	שס	Aryeh Deri	8.75%	11 / 120	11 / 120
UTJ	Religious conservatism	ג	Yaakov Litzman	5.16%	7 / 120	7 / 120
Hatnua	Social liberalism	צפ	Tzipi Livni	4.99%	6 / 120	6 / 120
Meretz	Progressivism; Secularism	מרצ	Zehava Gal-On	4.55%	6 / 120	6 / 120
Ra'am-Ta'al	Arab nationalism Islamism	עם	Ibrahim Sarsur	3.65%	4 / 120	4 / 120
Hadash	Communism; Socialism	ו	Ayman Odeh	2.99%	4 / 120	4 / 120
Balad	Palestinian nationalism	ד	Jamal Zahalka	2.56%	3 / 120	3 / 120
Kadima	Liberalism	כן	Shaul Mofaz	2.09%	2 / 120	2 / 120

== Campaign ==
=== Likud ===
Likud leadership election
Netanyahu
Danon
75%
19%
The Likud list

1	Benjamin Netanyahu	2	Gilad Erdan
3	Yuli Edelstein	4	Yisrael Katz
5	Miri Regev	6	Silvan Shalom
7	Moshe Ya'alon	8	Ze'ev Elkin
9	Danny Danon	10	Yariv Levin
11	Benny Begin	12	Tzachi Hanegbi
13	Yuval Steinitz	14	Gila Gamliel
15	Ofir Akunis	16	David Bitan (Note: Slot reserved for candidate from the Shfela region)
17	Haim Katz	18	Jackie Levy (Note: Slot reserved for candidate from the Galilee region)
19	Yoav Kish (Note: Slot reserved for candidate from the greater Tel Aviv area)	20	Tzipi Hotovely
21	Dudu Amsalem (Note: Slot reserved for candidate from the Jerusalem area)	22	Miki Zohar (Note: Slot reserved for candidate from the Negev region)
23	Anat Berko	24	Ayoob Kara
25	Nava Boker	26	Avi Dichter
27	Avraham Neguise (Note: Slot reserved for an immigrant)	28	Nurit Koren
29	Yaron Mazuz	30	Oren Hazan
31	Sharren Haskel	32	Amir Ohana
33	Yehuda Glick	34	Osnat Mark

Prime Minister Netanyahu called a primary for 25 December 2014; however, it was postponed until 6 January. After the election was called, the prime minister demanded a vote of the central committee to move it back up to 31 December. This was passed in a mini-referendum. The candidates were Netanyahu and former deputy defense minister Danny Danon. Likud's internal court changed the date to 6 January 2015 after finding that the vote lacked a two-thirds majority. A panel of Likud judges accepted Netanyahu's appeal and allowed the vote to occur on 31 December 2014.

The controversy over the timing of the primaries led to an internal investigation resulting in a report by party comptroller Shay Galilee that claimed Netanyahu had misused party employees. Galilee subsequently invited Netanyahu to a pre-disqualification hearing, which resulted in Netanyahu being prevented from running in the primaries. The prime minister immediately appealed to the Likud internal court. Menachem Ne’eman, the chairman of the Likud election committee, has claimed that Galilee acted outside his authority and that his decision is invalid. Netanyahu's attorney and his primary campaign have contested the disqualification. Netanyahu was allowed to run.

==== Primary results and aftermath ====
The primary results were widely seen as a victory for Netanyahu and the more moderate faction within Likud, as opposed to the far-right fringe. Moshe Feiglin, who for a long time led his own far-rightist faction within Likud and once challenged Netanyahu for the chairmanship, suffered a major defeat in the primary, failing to win a realistic spot on the ticket. In response, he left Likud and announced plans to form a new party. Feiglin said his new party, which may be called the Jewish State Party, will not run in the 2015 election, but will run in the next election after that.

==== Platform ====
The major foreign policy focus of Benjamin Netanyahu during this campaign has been to "prevent Iran from obtaining a nuclear capability, by turning world opinion in favor of maintaining and expanding economic and diplomatic sanctions against Tehran". Netanyahu reiterated his positions on Iran to a joint session of the United States Congress. In the Middle East peace process, "Netanyahu has spoken out against further withdrawals from land, further releases of terrorists from prisons, or dividing Jerusalem in any way". Additionally, Netanyahu and other Likud members suggested that positions that he had made in his famous Bar Ilan speech were now null and void. He reiterated this position on the last day of the campaign, telling Makor Rishon that "If I'm elected, there will be no Palestinian State".

Domestically, Likud "calls for a free-market economy with social sensitivity", suggesting that in order "to remain competitive in a global market, there is a need for budgetary discipline, lowering taxes, an effectively managed stock market, and growth of the private sector". The party has also pledged to "implement State Comptroller Joseph Shapira's recommendations for ending the housing crisis and improve benefits for the self-employed".

On election day, Netanyahu made a public statement, claiming:

The right-wing government is in danger. Arab voters are going in droves to the polls. Left-wing organizations are bringing them on buses. We only have you, Go to the polls, bring your friends and family, vote Likud, to close the gap between us and Labor Zionist Union. With your help and God's help, we will form a nationalist government that will protect the State of Israel.

It has been argued that this statement had implications on the Likud victory in the election. Following the elections, Netanyahu said he regretted the message.

The president of the United States, Barack Obama, criticized that statement.

=== Zionist Union ===
The Labor leadership election
Herzog
Yachimovich
58.5%
41.5%
Zionist Union list

1	Isaac Herzog	2	Tzipi Livni
3	Shelly Yachimovich	4	Stav Shaffir
5	Itzik Shmuli	6	Omer Bar-Lev
7	Yehiel Bar	8	Amir Peretz
9	Merav Michaeli	10	Eitan Cabel
11	Manuel Trajtenberg	12	Erel Margalit
13	Mickey Rosenthal	14	Revital Swid
15	Danny Atar	16	Yoel Hasson
17	Zouheir Bahloul	18	Eitan Broshi
19	Michal Biran	20	Nachman Shai
21	Ksenia Svetlova	22	Ayelet Nahmias-Verbin
23	Yossi Yona	24	Eyal Ben-Reuven
25	Yael Cohen Paran	26	Saleh Saad
27	Leah Fadida	28	Robert Tiviayev
29	Moshe Mizrahi	30	Eldad Yaniv

The Labor Party held its primaries on 13 January 2015, in which Isaac Herzog won against Shelly Yachimovich. The Labor Party and Hatnuah agreed on 10 December 2014 to form a joint ticket. Hatnuah head Tzipi Livni has said that other parties will also be part of the alliance. Herzog and Livni initially said that if they won enough votes to form the next government, they would take turns in the role of prime minister, with Herzog serving for the first two years and Livni for the second two, in a compromise known as rotation, though Livni announced on 16 March 2015 that only Herzog would serve as prime minister.

Aluf (Major General, res.) Amos Yadlin was the party's candidate for Ministry of Defence, though he did not run in the election itself.

The alliance was expanded further when Livni selected Yael Cohen Paran, a co-chair of the Green Movement, Major General (res.) Eyal Ben-Reuven, and Yoel Hasson for Hatnuah's reserved slots on the Zionist Union list.

The slate was endorsed by former prime minister Ehud Barak, former prime minister and president Shimon Peres, former Shin Bet chief Yuval Diskin, former Mossad chief Meir Dagan, head of Israel's wealthiest family Stef Wertheimer, columnist Ari Shavit, the daily Haaretz, and The Economist.

==== Platform ====
Maintaining its position firmly within the Israeli peace camp, the party pledged to "reignite a process with our Palestinian neighbors based on a regional platform, and foster our unique and special relationship with Washington", but did not specify in greater detail the concessions that would be made by a Zionist Union government, other than saying that the Jordan Valley must be Israel's eastern security border. The party also pledged "to rescue Israel from its international isolation [by] restor[ing] relations with the US and Europe, and unit[ing] the world in its war against terrorism and aggression".

Much of the party's policy has been focused on economic issues facing Israelis, due in large part to members of the 2011 Israeli social justice protests currently on the party's slate of candidates. The party has pledged "support for 300,000 available apartments, released to the market at the rate of 50,000–60,000 per year, and subsidizing land value in housing, while providing an opportunity for partial ownership through rent payments." The party also plans to "lower the costs of healthcare, education, and basic goods for every family in Israel, allocating NIS 2 billion to create a basic aid package for senior citizens in need and launch a national savings program for children".

=== Joint List ===
The Joint List

1	Ayman Odeh	2	Masud Ghnaim
3	Jamal Zahalka	4	Ahmad Tibi
5	Aida Touma-Suleiman	6	Abd al-Hakim Hajj Yahya
7	Haneen Zoabi	8	Dov Khenin
9	Taleb Abu Arar	10	Yousef Jabareen
11	Basel Ghattas	12	Osama Saadi
13	Abdullah Abu Ma'aruf	14	Juma Azbarga
15	Said al-Harumi	16	Ibrahim Hijazi
17	Youssef Atauna	18	Wael Younis

Following the raising of the electoral threshold, Balad, Hadash, the southern branch of the Islamic Movement, Ta'al, and the United Arab List agreed on 22 January 2015 to run on the same list in the election, the first time the major Arab parties had all run on a single list. One poll suggested that the formation of the alliance, later named the Joint List, could increase turnout amongst Arab voters to 56%, 10% higher than in the 2013 elections. However, the more hard-line northern branch of the Islamic Movement opted to boycott the elections, alongside the Abnaa el-Balad (Sons of the Village) movement.

==== Platform ====
Despite the official positions of anti-Zionism of some of the List's parties, the party's platform on the Middle East peace process tries to stake a moderate position. The Joint List's policy on the peace process "calls for a just peace based on UN resolutions, ending the occupation of all land Israel captured in 1967, dismantling all settlements and the security barrier, releasing all "political prisoners", and forming a Palestinian state with Jerusalem as its capital". Additionally, the party "calls for a just solution to the Palestinian refugee problem, which guarantees a right of return and self-rule for Israeli-Arab citizens on educational, cultural and religious issues". On other foreign policy matters, the party "supports a nuclear-free Israel and Middle East".

Due to the fact that the party is primarily concerned with the interests of Israeli Arabs, the party "calls for full equality in state budgeting for Jewish and Arab municipalities and institutions, as well as affirmative action to help the poor – who are disproportionately Arab". Additionally, the party wants to raise the minimum wage to 60% of the average salary.

=== Yesh Atid ===
The Yesh Atid list

1	Yair Lapid	2	Shai Piron
3	Yael German	4	Meir Cohen
5	Yaakov Peri	6	Ofer Shelah
7	Haim Yellin	8	Yoel Razvozov
9	Karin Elharar	10	Aliza Lavie
11	Mickey Levy	12	Elazar Stern
13	Pnina Tamano-Shata	14	Boaz Toporovsky
15	Ruth Calderon	16	Yifat Kariv
17	Dov Lipman	18	Ronen Hoffman
19	Zehorit Shorek	20	Ofra Finkelstein

Hailed as the kingmakers in the 2013 elections, Yesh Atid and its leader Yair Lapid have seen their popularity cut in half since joining the government. Elected on a "promise to lower the cost of living and improve the middle class's quality of life, Lapid implemented a string of unpopular austerity measures after being appointed finance minister that, he said, were necessary to counter a government deficit that ran into the tens of billions of shekels". Such actions led to Lapid being named the "most disappointing politician of 2013" and giving him the lowest approval ratings of cabinet ministers.

Following the election call, several sitting Yesh Atid MKs announced their intention not to run in the upcoming elections, including Rina Frenkel, Adi Koll, and Shimon Solomon. However, the party gained a member from another party, as Hatnuah MK Elazar Stern joined Yesh Atid following party leader Tzipi Livni's merger with Labor.

==== Platform ====
Yesh Atid's platform on the Middle East peace is firmly in the middle. The party "maintains that Israel was founded as the nation-state of the Jewish people and must remain a state with a Jewish majority, with defensible borders". The party suggested that a multilateral approach involving Israel's neighbors would allow for Israel's long-term security as well as a Palestinian state.

On the subject of Iran, the party says Israel cannot allow Iran to become a nuclear threshold state and must do everything to prevent that scenario, in conjunction with the international community if possible, and unilaterally if necessary.

Party leader Yair Lapid served as a finance minister in Netanyahu's government and takes both the support and the blame for the government's fiscal policies. Had the government not fallen, Lapid's 2015 budget "would have increased investment in social services by more than NIS 10 billion without incurring any increase in taxes". The party "believes in a fair economic policy that directs budgetary investments to the middle class and the weakest in society, closing social gaps, while strengthening the market and encouraging growth". The party calls for more spending on health, education, and welfare, as well as encouraging growth and investment in the industry by assisting small and medium businesses and promoting innovation in the market, fighting the black market, and striving to put public funds back in the hands of the public.

=== Kulanu ===
The Kulanu list

1	Moshe Kahlon	2	Yoav Galant
3	Eli Alaluf	4	Michael Oren
5	Rachel Azaria	6	Tali Ploskov
7	Yifat Shasha-Biton	8	Eli Cohen
9	Roy Folkman	10	Meirav Ben-Ari
11	Shai Babad	12	Akram Hasson
13	Tomer Uzan

The Kulanu party was established in November 2014 by former Likud MK Moshe Kahlon following months of speculation.

Kahlon was able to attract some high-profile candidates for the Kulanu party list, including former Israeli Ambassador to the United States Michael Oren and Deputy Mayor of Jerusalem Rachel Azaria. However, one of these candidates, former Reshet Aleph director and IBA presenter Tsega Melaku, was barred from running in the elections, due to the fact that she did not wait the requisite 100 days between quitting her public sector job and running in a general election.

==== Ideology ====
Kahlon is known for his support for egalitarian economics and for issues affecting the middle class, although he also maintains a strong working-class appeal. As communications minister, he earned popularity by taking on Israel's wireless cartel and forcing them to lower mobile phone prices by introducing new competitors. His platform aims to break up business monopolies and lower the high cost of living. Traditionally known for a hard line on security matters, Kahlon has in more recent times suggested support for territorial compromise for a two-state solution. He has said he is "a product of the Likud", but that his "worldview is center, slightly leaning to the right". Within the Likud, he was known to be socially liberal. Ari Shavit wrote in January 2015 that Kulanu had the potential to be the true successor to the national liberalism of Ze'ev Jabotinsky and Menachem Begin. It is not clear with which political bloc his party is naturally allied. Kahlon considers himself a long-standing member of both Israel's "national camp" and its "social camp". While campaigning in 2015, he would not say whether the party would endorse Benjamin Netanyahu or Isaac Herzog for prime minister, although Galant, placed second on the party's list, suggested it would prefer Herzog.

=== The Jewish Home ===
The Jewish Home leadership election
Bennett
Or
90%
10%
The Jewish Home list

1	Naftali Bennett	2	Uri Ariel
3	Ayelet Shaked	4	Eli Ben-Dahan
5	Nissan Slomiansky	6	Yinon Magal
7	Moti Yogev	8	Bezalel Smotrich
9	Shuli Mualem	10	Avi Wortzman
11	Nir Orbach	12	Avichai Rontzki
13	Orit Strook	14	Anat Roth
15	Ronen Shoval	16	Avihai Boaron
17	Nahi Eyal	18	Moshe Solomon
19	Yehudit Shilat	20	Sarah Eliash

The Jewish Home held its primary elections on 14 January 2015. It has agreed to a vote-sharing agreement with Likud. Tkuma has candidates on the same list as the Jewish Home for the election. It held its primaries on 11 January 2015. Its Knesset members will be placed on the 2nd, 8th, 13th and 17th slots in the joint list.

Rabbi Shimon Or competed against incumbent party leader Naftali Bennett in 14 January leadership elections.

Minister Uri Orbach was placed 6th in the list, but he died on 16 February 2015.

==== Platform ====
The Jewish Home is "the only incumbent party in Israel that opposes any type of Palestinian state west of the Jordan River", as well as a one-state solution, which it sees as "infeasible and dangerous". The party instead supports annexing Area C, and giving Area A and B self-governing autonomy.

The party's economic platform is "committed to increasing competition, breaking up monopolies, and cutting taxes to the middle class whenever possible, because the party believes the government must encourage new ventures by maintaining a business-friendly climate through favorable economic policies and cutting red tape". The party also supports doubling the incentive package given to small businesses, allowing them to borrow up to 85 percent of set-up costs.

=== Yisrael Beiteinu ===
The Yisrael Beiteinu list

1	Avigdor Lieberman	2	Orly Levi-Abekasis
3	Sofa Landver	4	Ilan Shohat
5	Sharon Gal	6	Hamad Amar
7	Robert Ilatov	8	Oded Forer
9	Yulia Malinovsky	10	Alex Miller
11	Shimon Ohayon	12	Leon Litinetski

Yisrael Beiteinu, who ran in the 2013 elections on a joint party list with Likud, split from the party in July 2014, with analysts suggesting that it was due to policy disagreements between Prime Minister Netanyahu and Yisrael Beitenu leader Avigdor Lieberman, specifically regarding the 2014 kidnapping and murder of Israeli teenagers and the ensuing conflict in Gaza. The party's poll numbers stayed relatively steady after the split from Likud, but began to slide in early 2015.

==== Platform ====
Party leader Avigdor Liberman has publicized his own plan for peace with the Palestinians. The Lieberman Plan is controversial due to its plan for massive population exchanges between Jews and Arabs.

On economic issues, the party pledged a 90% mortgage for the purchase of a first apartment for couples in which both partners work, and served in the army or did national service. Additionally, they suggest that the state should provide after-school activities until 5 p.m. for children aged from six months to six years.

The party would also run on a platform that included death sentences for terrorists; in July of the same year a bill was proposed, and sponsored by one of the party's members, to allow a majority of presiding judges to sentence a terrorist to death. By a vote of 94–6 the bill was rejected in its first reading.

=== United Torah Judaism ===
The United Torah Judaism list

1	Yaakov Litzman	2	Moshe Gafni
3	Meir Porush	4	Uri Maklev
5	Eliezer Moses	6	Yisrael Eichler
7	Ya'akov Asher	8	Eliezer Sorotzkin
9	Shlomo Teitel

United Torah Judaism, or Yehadut HaTorah, is an alliance between:

- The Degel HaTorah ("Banner [of] the Torah") party that is guided by the rabbinic heads (usually the leading roshei yeshiva ("deans") of the Lithuanian yeshivot) of non-Hasidic Haredi Ashkenazi Jews.
- The Agudat Israel ("Union [of] Israel") party that is guided by the followers of Hasidism in Israel, and also consisting of Ashkenazi Jews. The leading members of this party are the followers of the Ger, Vizhnitz, Boston, and Sadigura Hasidim.

==== Platform ====
As a party that caters to Israel's large Haredi and Hasidic community, the party's platform reflects this. On foreign policy, "the party's guiding principle is that the Land of Israel was given to the Jewish people by God, and belongs to them forever". When faced with practical questions on the conflict, leading rabbis will also consider pikuach nefesh, the Jewish legalistic principle of saving life taking priority over all else. At heart, the party is "committed to true peace in the Middle East, and putting an end to the bloodshed".

The party "demands a solution to the Haredi housing shortage, and will work to change housing policies to enable young couples to comfortably purchase or rent a suitable home". Additionally, the party "insists that state land be allocated free of charge to those eligible for state housing, and will work to construct a program to populate these units with homeless from the Haredi community". On other social issues, the party also wishes to educate Israelis in Jewish values regarding economic stability and managing family economics. The party's economic policy advocates a focus on the private sector and decreasing government involvement in the economy.

=== Shas ===
The Shas list

1	Aryeh Deri	2	Yitzhak Cohen
3	Meshulam Nahari	4	Yaakov Margi
5	David Azoulay	6	Yoav Ben Tzur
7	Yitzhak Vaknin	8	Avraham Michaeli
9	Haim Biton	10	Yigal Guetta
11	Michael Malchieli	12	Rafi Baranes

One of the fiercest rivalries in this campaign has been competition among several different parties for the votes of Sephardic Haredi Jews. Historically, Shas, a Sephardic Haredi party founded by Sephardic Chief Rabbi Ovadia Yosef has been the key party among Haredi Sephardic and Mizrahi populations. In 1999, Shas leader Aryeh Deri was convicted of taking $155,000 in bribes while serving as interior minister, and given a three-year jail sentence. In 2000, he was replaced by Eli Yishai. Yishai led the party for over ten years after Deri's imprisonment, leading the party through Knesset elections until 2013. Deri was released from prison for good behavior in 2002, and remained a popular figure within his constituency.

Between 2011 and 2014, several events occurred that created rifts in the party. In 2011, after years out of the political spotlight, Deri announced an interest in returning to politics. After Aryeh Deri announced his return to politics, and following a series of highly publicised events that led to an increase in the tensions between the Haredi public and the non-Haredi public, Shas's popularity began to falter, according to most polls. As a result, Shas chairman Eli Yishai requested that Aryeh Deri join the party, instead of establishing an independent party. Shas spiritual leader Ovadia Yosef offered Aryeh Deri the 3rd position on the party list, but Deri rejected it at first, and was believed to want to lead the party, start his own party (which according to polls might win as many as 7 seats), or not participate in the election at all. On 16 October, a compromise was reached: Shas would not have a formal chairman, but would instead be jointly led by Deri, Yishai, and Housing and Construction Minister Ariel Atias. In May 2013, some months after internal rift following Deri's political comeback, Yishai was ousted and Deri was once again renamed as the leader of the Shas party. Ovadia Yosef, the Sephardi sage and Shas spiritual leader, said regarding his decision to oust Yishai: "It was a deposit that he held, and now, he can redeem it." Yosef also said he had told Deri at the time of his imprisonment that the position of party leader would be returned to him. 2013 also marked the death of Ovadia Yosef, the party's spiritual leader.

In 2014, Yishai created a new party, called Yachad. On 28 December 2014, a recording was released of Rabbi Yosef, condemning Deri and supporting Yishai in 2008, years before Deri's return to politics. In response to these recordings, Deri tendered his resignation to the party leadership, which they rejected.

There were also protests and threats to boycott the election from some Haredi women, upset with the fact that the Haredi parties do not allow women on the ballot.

At the end of the campaign, Yishai sent an open letter to Deri, "calling for peace and unity between the two parties for Election Day and in the coming Knesset, in order to defeat evil decrees against the Torah and against the working class". "Deri dismissed Yishai's missive as hypocritical, and said that he had pleaded for co-operation from Yishai before he quit Shas, but to no avail".

==== Platform ====
The party's platform on the peace process is simple. Aryeh Deri has suggested that "there is currently no negotiating partner on the Palestinian side; so, the basis of the next government should be socio-economic". On that subject, Shas' economic plan calls for an increase in the minimum wage to NIS 30 an hour, lowering the value-added tax on basic household items, and requiring 7.5% of every building plan to be devoted to public housing. Shas insist that their housing plan creates Mixed-income housing, rather than segregating rich and poor neighborhoods.

=== Meretz ===
The Meretz list

1	Zehava Gal-On	2	Ilan Gilon
3	Issawi Frej	4	Michal Rozin
5	Tamar Zandberg	6	Mossi Raz
7	Gaby Lasky	8	Avi Dabush
9	Avshalom Vilan	10	Uri Zaki

Meretz held its primaries on 19 January 2015 at a meeting of its 1,000-member central committee in the Tel Aviv Fairgrounds. Leader Zehava Gal-On was re-elected as head of the party, whilst MK Nitzan Horowitz chose not to stand.

==== Platform ====
Meretz remains the most vocal party within the Israeli peace camp. Leader Zehava Gal-On said that any solution must be based on two states for two peoples, with a border based on pre-1967 lines with agreed-upon land swaps, and include an end to the conflict through a regional solution hinged on the Arab Peace Plan. The party sees UN recognition of a Palestinian state as a pathway toward negotiations, and calls for the following immediate steps to be taken: Stopping settlement construction, paying Israeli residents of the West Bank to leave willingly, and removing the naval blockade on the Gaza Strip in a gradual and co-ordinated way.

Meretz is also one of the more left-wing parties in terms of economic policy. The party seeks to create a welfare state with broad-reaching social services that are effectively regulated and monitored. It calls for more support for workers and organized labor, rather than the rich, equalizing society through tax reform, and reducing spending in areas such as settlements and the security budget.

=== Yachad and Otzma Yehudit ===
The Yachad list

1	Eli Yishai	2	Yoni Chetboun
3	Michael Ayash	4	Baruch Marzel (Note: Slot reserved for a member of Otzma Yehudit)
5	Sason Treblesi	6	Amital Bar-Eli
7	Dudi Shwamenfeld	8	Ya'akov Yakir

Former Shas MK Eli Yishai unveiled Yachad on 15 December 2014.

The Otzma LeYisrael party, which failed to cross the electoral threshold in the 2013 elections, was rebranded as the Otzma Yehudit (Jewish Strength) party. The leaders of the party announced that they would consider running with breakaway groups from Shas and the Jewish Home, but not with the Jewish Home itself, because they viewed Naftali Bennett as "insufficiently right-wing".

The two parties came to an agreement on a joint electoral list, running under the Yachad name.

==== Platform ====
Party chairman Eli Yishai told Jeremy Sharon of The Jerusalem Post that he was against giving away any territory from the Land of Israel, and would not agree to any future settlement freeze. The party's economic policy focussed primarily on bridging the gap between rich and poor. Due to Yishai's support within the Haredi community, the party opposed economic sanctions against Haredi draft-dodgers.

=== Other participating parties ===
The Ale Yarok (Green Leaf) party, which supports legalizing marijuana, said that anyone who donated to them would receive marijuana if and when the plant was legalized in Israel. As a result, the party raised over NIS 100,000 as of 13 January. Green Leaf has never won parliamentary seats before; however, there are enough cannabis smokers in Israel that if even a quarter of them vote for Ale Yarok, the party will have a good chance of winning seats.

In January, a political party led by Haredi women declared its intention to run in the upcoming elections, a first in the Israeli political system. The party, which is called U'Bizchutan ("And By Their [female] Merit"), includes Ruth Korian and Noah Erez on its list. Party leader Ruth Korian asked for protection from the government after she said her 10-year-old daughter was pulled out of class and questioned about party activities.

The "We Are All Friends Na Nach" party, representing Breslover Hasidim, is also running. Because the name of the party in Hebrew is "Kulanu Haverim Na Nach", they objected to the use of the first word by Moshe Kahlon's Kulanu party. Ultimately, however, both parties were allowed to use the name.

The Greens party renamed itself this election as the "Greens Don't Give A Fuck" party.

Other parties running again after failing to cross the threshold in the previous election are the Pirate Party, Or, HaTikva LeShinui ("The Hope for Change"), and the Economy Party headed by the Goldstein brothers. Atid Ehad ran under the name "Protecting Our Children – Stop Feeding Them Porn". Though it submitted a list to the Central Elections Committee, the party decided to drop out of the elections and throw its support behind The Jewish Home when it determined based on polls that it would receive fewer than 30,000 votes.

Former United Arab List MK Taleb el-Sana founded a party called "The Arab List" after not receiving a slot on the Arab parties' Joint List. An alliance of the Arab National Party headed by Muhamad Kanan and the Arab Democratic Party headed by el-Sana, the party submitted a list to the Central Elections Committee, with Kanan in the top spot and not including el-Sana, but decided to drop out of the elections only one week before the polls. However, its ballot papers still appeared in voting booths.

Other parties running for the first time in this election were Democratura, Manhigut Hevratit ("Social Leadership") headed by former Moreshet Avot head Ilan Meshicha, Nivheret Ha'Am HaZmanit ("The Temporary National Team") headed by former Brit Olam founder Ofer Lifschitz, Schirut BeKavod ("Making a Living With Honor"), and Perach ("Flower").

=== Non-participating parties ===
==== Kadima ====
After polls showed that Kadima would be unable to win any seats in 2015 if it competed on its own, there were reports that the Zionist Union was considering adding it to its ticket by reserving the 11th spot for Kadima leader Shaul Mofaz. However, Mofaz rejected these rumors, stating he had no intention of joining the alliance, and announced that he was retiring from politics in January 2015. He was replaced as party leader by Akram Hasson, the first time a Druze Israeli had led a Jewish party. His leadership of the party was short-lived, however, as Hasson shortly quit the party to join the Kulanu list, receiving the 12th slot. Without either of its current MKs, Kadima did not run in the election.

== Results ==
The elections resulted in a record number of women (29) being elected to the Knesset.

Party	Votes	%	Seats	±
Likud	985,408	23.40	30	+12
Zionist Union	786,313	18.67	24	+3
Joint List	446,583	10.61	13	+2
Yesh Atid	371,602	8.82	11	–8
Kulanu	315,360	7.49	10	New
The Jewish Home	283,910	6.74	8	–4
Shas	241,613	5.74	7	–4
Yisrael Beiteinu	214,906	5.10	6	–7
United Torah Judaism	210,143	4.99	6	–1
Meretz	165,529	3.93	5	–1
Yachad	125,158	2.97	0	New
Ale Yarok	47,180	1.12	0	0
Arab List (Mada–Arab National Party)	4,301	0.10	0	New
The Greens	2,992	0.07	0	0
We Are All Friends Na Nach	2,493	0.06	0	0
U'Bizchutan	1,802	0.04	0	New
Hope for Change	1,385	0.03	0	0
Pirate Party	895	0.02	0	0
Flower Party	823	0.02	0	New
Brit Olam	761	0.02	0	0
Or	502	0.01	0	0
Living with Dignity	423	0.01	0	0
Economy Party	337	0.01	0	0
Democratura	242	0.01	0	New
Social Leadership	223	0.01	0	0
Total	4,210,884	100.00	120	0
Valid votes	4,210,884	98.97		
Invalid/blank votes	43,854	1.03		
Total votes	4,254,738	100.00		
Registered voters/turnout	5,881,696	72.34		
Source: CEC

== Aftermath ==
=== Analysis ===
Although Likud won a plurality of 30 seats, the election did not result in a rightward drift, as much of Likud's success came at the expense of more nationalist parties. In fact, by some counts (particularly if the centrist Kulanu is considered aligned with the left-leaning bloc), the left picked up seats. Bernard Avishai called it a "compromised victory" for Likud, using David Horovitz's terminology to point out that Netanyahu had "desperately cannibalized" other parties in his ideological camp. Nevertheless, Likud's lead put Netanyahu in a comfortable position to attract potential partners, including nationalist and religious parties, into a coalition with less ideological divisions than his last government, given the unlikely return of the center-left Yesh Atid and Hatnuah factions to the coalition, the departure of many extremists within Likud, and the diminished size of other right-wing parties. The 20th Knesset saw fewer settlers (and supporters of settlements outside the major blocs), fewer Orthodox lawmakers, a record number of women, more supporters of progressive streams of Judaism, and more Arabs.

Despite his electoral victory, coalition building proved very difficult for Netanyahu.

=== Reactions ===
Two days after the election, U.S. President Barack Obama called Netanyahu to congratulate him on his victory. During the call, Obama said that the United States would "re-assess" aspects of its relationship with Israel. This came after Netanyahu said some controversial statements about the two-state solution during his re-election campaign. A possible effect of the election has been described as the worsening of an already "poisonous" relationship between Obama and Netanyahu. According to Jeffrey Goldberg, American Jewish leaders were "uniformly, and deeply, anxious" about Israel's future in the wake of the victory by Netanyahu, whose election tactics also put off many American Jews and pro-Israel groups.

Many prominent Palestinians rejoiced at the news, believing it would give them increased legitimacy and Israel decreased credibility in the international arena and among its own allies. Similarly, Thomas Friedman observed: "From Iran's point of view, it makes fantastic TV on Al Jazeera, and all the European networks; it undermines Israel's legitimacy with the young generation on college campuses around the globe; and it keeps the whole world much more focused on Israeli civil rights abuses against Palestinians, rather than the massive civil rights abuses perpetrated by the Iranian regime against its own people. It is stunning how much Bibi's actions serve Tehran's strategic interests."

Iran's foreign ministry said on Wednesday it saw no difference between Israel's political parties and called them all aggressors. Iran's foreign ministry spokeswoman Marizeh Afkham told reporters at a weekly news conference in Tehran: "For us, there is no difference between the Zionist regime's political parties. They are all aggressors in nature."

Indian prime minister Narendra Modi congratulated Prime Minister Netanyahu following the Likud party's success in the elections, in a post on Modi's Twitter account reading, "Mazel tov, my friend Bibi @Netanyahu..."

British Prime Minister David Cameron congratulated Benjamin Netanyahu on his Likud Party's success in the Israeli elections. In a message on Twitter, Mr. Cameron said: "Congratulations to Netanyahu on election result. As one of Israel's firmest friends, UK looks forward to working with new government."

Canadian prime minister Stephen Harper also tweeted congratulations: "I congratulate PM Netanyahu on his election results. We look fwd to working w/ the gov't once formed. Israel has no greater friend than Cda."

== Government formation ==
Following the elections, the leaders of parties with seats in the Knesset gave their suggestions to President Reuven Rivlin as to which party leader should be given the task of forming a coalition. Kulanu, the Jewish Home, Yisrael Beiteinu, Shas and United Torah Judaism all joined the Likud in suggesting the incumbent prime minister Netanyahu, giving him the support of 67 of the 120 seats. The Zionist Union and Meretz both suggested Zionist Union leader Isaac Herzog, giving him a total of 29 seats. Yesh Atid and the Joint List both chose to abstain and not suggest any party leader. These suggestions do not define who will, and will not, end up in a coalition: In Israel's 2013 election, Hatnuah did not suggest Netanyahu and joined his government, while the ultra-Orthodox parties Shas and United Torah Judaism both suggested Netanyahu, but did not join his coalition.

Party	Party Leader	Seats	Recommended
Likud	Benjamin Netanyahu	30	Benjamin Netanyahu
Zionist Union	Isaac Herzog	24	Isaac Herzog
Joint List	Ayman Odeh	13	No one
Yesh Atid	Yair Lapid	11	No one
Kulanu	Moshe Kahlon	10	Benjamin Netanyahu
The Jewish Home	Naftali Bennett	8	Benjamin Netanyahu
Shas	Aryeh Deri	7	Benjamin Netanyahu
Yisrael Beiteinu	Avigdor Lieberman	6	Benjamin Netanyahu
UTJ	Yaakov Litzman	6	Benjamin Netanyahu
Meretz	Zehava Gal-On	5	Isaac Herzog
		67	Benjamin Netanyahu
		29	Isaac Herzog
		24	No one

Rivlin encouraged a unity government between Likud and the Zionist Union, but Isaac Herzog reiterated that unity government "never was, and never will be". Reports shortly after the election had the Kulanu party, led by Moshe Kahlon, in a decisive position to pick the next prime minister. At the time, Kulanu leader Kahlon remained open to forging a coalition with either Netanyahu or Herzog, and stated that he would make his decision "after all the votes are counted".

On 25 March, President Reuven Rivlin tasked Netanyahu to form a new government. As there were no coalition partners in place on 20 April, Rivlin granted Netanyahu a two-week extension, until 6 May, to form his coalition.

Avigdor Lieberman, the outgoing foreign minister, announced shortly before the 6 May deadline that his Yisrael Beiteinu party would not join a coalition with the Likud. Consequently, Netanyahu and his Likud party formed a narrow coalition government including The Jewish Home, United Torah Judaism, Kulanu, and Shas. This coalition commanded a bare majority of 61 seats in the 120-seat Knesset. No candidate was announced to lead the Foreign Ministry. It was believed that Netanyahu was still trying to lure Herzog to lead the post, but Herzog rejected the idea. Due to the makeup of the coalition and its slim majority, analysts did not expect the government to last long or achieve much.

As required by Israel's Basic Law: The Government, Netanyahu informed Rivlin that he had succeeded in forming a coalition just two hours before the deadline. The government was approved by the plenum of the Knesset on 14 May, after a stormy debate, by a vote of 61–59.

== See also ==
- List of members of the twentieth Knesset
