= Moshe Mizrahi (politician) =

Israeli politician (1950–2022)

- משה מזרחי
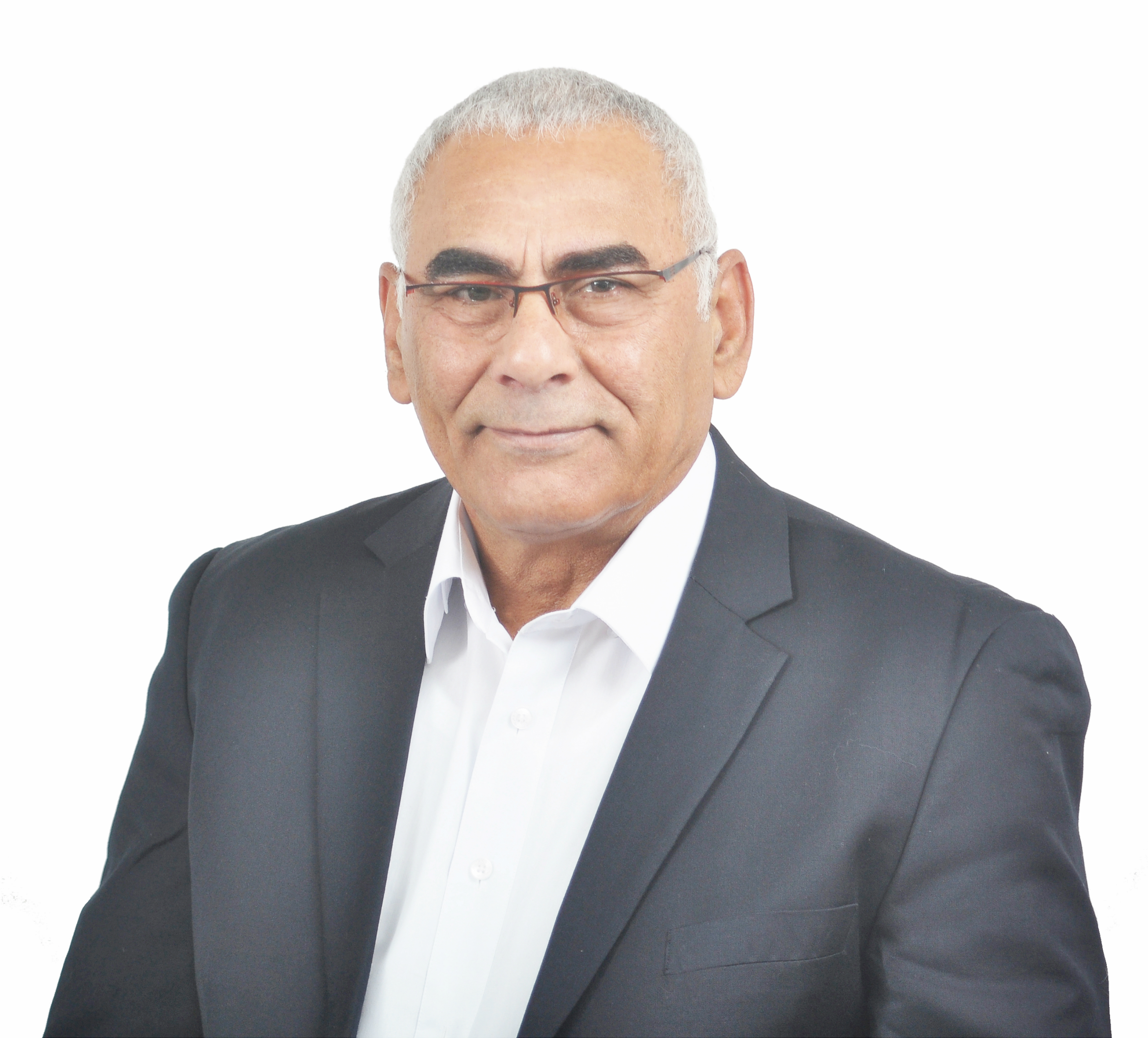

Faction represented in the Knesset
- 2013–2015: Labor Party
- 2018–2019: Zionist Union
- 2019: Labor Party

Personal details
- Born: 20 September 1950 Tiberias, Israel
- Died: 11 December 2022 (aged 72) Shoham, Israel

Moshe Mizrahi (Hebrew: משה מזרחי; 20 September 1950 – 11 December 2022) was a senior Israel Police official and a member of Knesset for the Labor Party (2013–2015) and Zionist Union (2018–2019).

Mizrahi received a bachelor of Law degree from Tel Aviv University and enlisted in the Israel Police in 1976 where he rose to become the commander of the Police College for senior police officers, the founder and first commanding officer of the Unit of International Crime Investigations, Major General of the Israel Police Investigations Division (from 2001-2005) and the Head of the Police and Community Branch-Civil Guard Division (from 2005-2006).

He was elected in 2013 to the 19th Knesset as a representative of the Israeli Labor Party, and served on the Constitution, Law and Justice Committee, the Special Committee for the Rights of the Child, and the Special Committee on Foreign Workers. He was a leader in the 'Fight against Bureaucracy' and 'Reform in Public Administration' lobbies. He served as a member of the 20th Knesset for the Zionist Union from 2018 to 2019.

== Biography ==
Mizrahi was born in the Scottish Hospital in Tiberias in 1950, the seventh of eight children. He started his national service with the IDF in November 1968 and was assigned to the Golani Brigade. After being injured in a training accident, he lost his right eye and was released from the army. He went on to study law at Tel Aviv University and later joined Israel Police in March 1976, initially as a prosecutor.

Mizrahi served as Commander of the College for Executive Officers between 1995 and 1997. On 1 February 1997 he was appointed head of the National Unit for International Investigations, a position he held until becoming head of the Investigative Branch on 1 January 2001. He was later removed from his post in 2004 by Internal Security Minister Gideon Ezra after being accused of overusing wiretapping during an investigation into Yisrael Beiteinu leader Avigdor Lieberman, He subsequently became head of the Community and Civil Guard, a position he held until 1 June 2006. When he retired in 2006, he had reached the rank of Major General.

In 2008 he ran for election to Shoham local council on the Future Shoham list, and was elected as the party won two seats. Prior to the 2013 Knesset elections he was placed fifteenth on the Labor Party list, and entered the Knesset when the party won 15 seats.

Mizrahi was placed 29th on the Zionist Union list (an alliance of Labor and Hatnuah) for the 2015 elections, losing his seat as the alliance won 24 seats. However, he returned to the Knesset in October 2018 as a replacement for Zouheir Bahloul.

Mizrahi died at his residence in Shoham on 11 December 2022.
