= Equaliser Goal =

Israeli socioeconomic project

Equaliser Goal (Hebrew: "שער שוויון", "Sha'ar Shivyon") is an Israeli educational, social and sports project, the goal of which is to promote children of low Socioeconomic status, and to bring together children from different communities, using football, in order to develop the values of mutual respect, tolerance and breaking barriers between communities.

The project's name is a Word play on the term "Equaliser Goal" in Football, as well as "the Gate to Equality" between people of different origins.

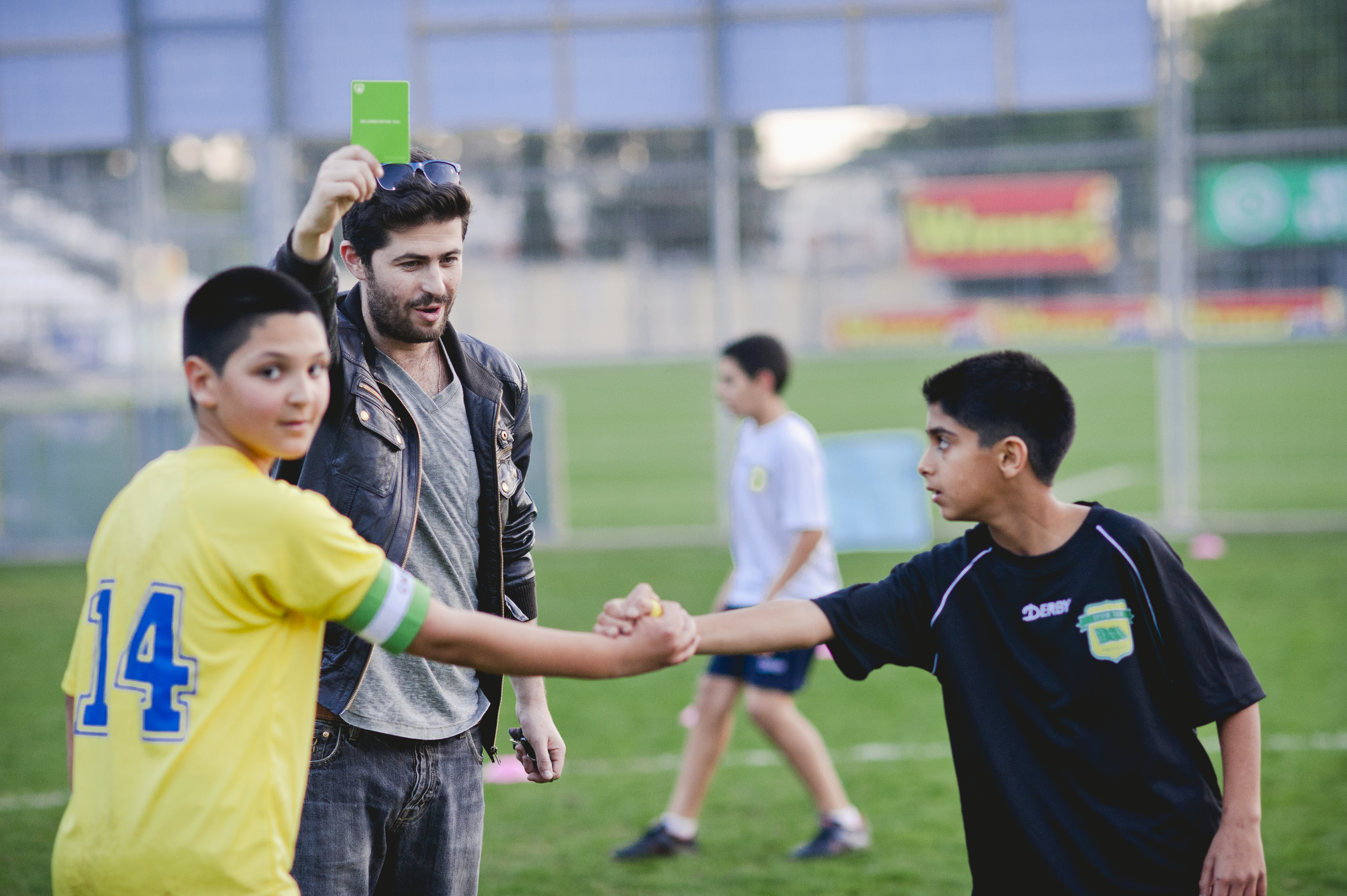
A volunteer referee gives a Green Card to a player for appreciation of good behavior and fairness.

The project started in 2009 with seven teams, from seven different schools, and has since grown rapidly. Today (2016), 115 teams participate in the project, consisting of 1,700 children aged 9 to 12. Participants include boys and girls; Jews, Muslims, Druze in Israel and others; Teams of deaf and hearing impaired; And also mixed teams - Jews and Arabs, new immigrants alongside Israeli born.

The children participate in the project four times a week. Two sessions are devoted to football practice, and the other two to studying, homework and preparation for exams. Tournaments are held once a month between the teams. Participation in football activities is subject to successful participation in the academic sessions, as well as proper behavior in schools. The teams coaches, administrative staff, guides and referees are all volunteers, as many as 300 nationwide.

The project is supported by the Israel Football Association and UEFA, the Union of European Football Associations. In 2013, the British Embassy in Israel joined the support force.

== Special Events ==
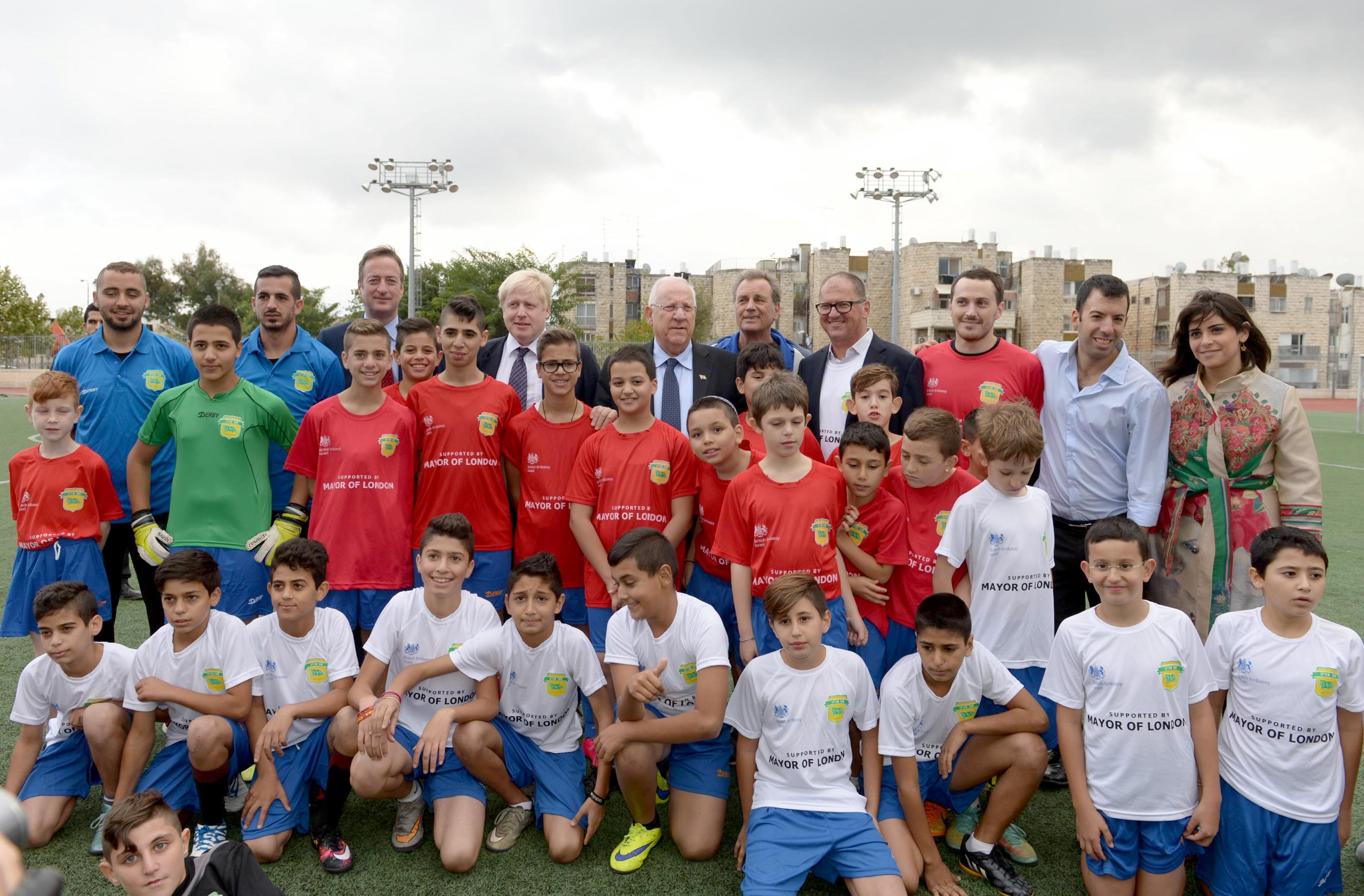
President of Israel, Reuven Rivlin and Mayor of London, Boris Johnson participate in the grand opening of the "Equaliser Goal" league, November 2015.

- In December 2014 the British Embassy initiated a football tournament, for the 100th anniversary of the event known as the Christmas truce: In the Christmas of 1914, during World War I, British and German soldiers ceased fire and engaged in various peaceful activities, including football matches.
  During the tournament, the British Ambassador Matthew Gould said: "He have gone through a hard summer. Now there's no politics, just use of football to build bridges and friendships. Jewish, Arab, and Druze are coming together to play football, which breaks down barriers between communities. It is a really lovely way to remember what happened 100 years ago."
  A number of top Israeli football players attended the tournament, and their presence caused excitement and joy to the children. Former radio broadcaster (and present parliament member) Zouheir Bahloul told the crowd: "I am an Arab but I broadcast football in Hebrew. We Arabs and Jews outside, but on the field we are together, and there is no chance of winning if we do not 'double verse properly between Arab and Jew."
  Mahran Radi, an Arab Israeli who plays in the premier league, said: “In the current situation, I think sport can unite anew the different populations in Israel. There is no easy or correct way to do this, but soccer is the most popular thing in the world.”
- In August 2016, a delegation of two teams from the project, one Arab and the other Jewish, went on a journey to Brazil, during the 2016 Summer Olympics in Rio de Janeiro. During the games the children watched the competitions by some of the Israeli athletes (including medalists Yarden Gerbi and Or Sasson), and held football matches with local teams, including one in the official Olympic stadium, Maracanã Stadium, prior to a Campeonato Brasileiro Série A match. The delegation received very wide coverage in the media, both in Brazil and in Israel.
