= Eitan Broshi =

Israeli politician

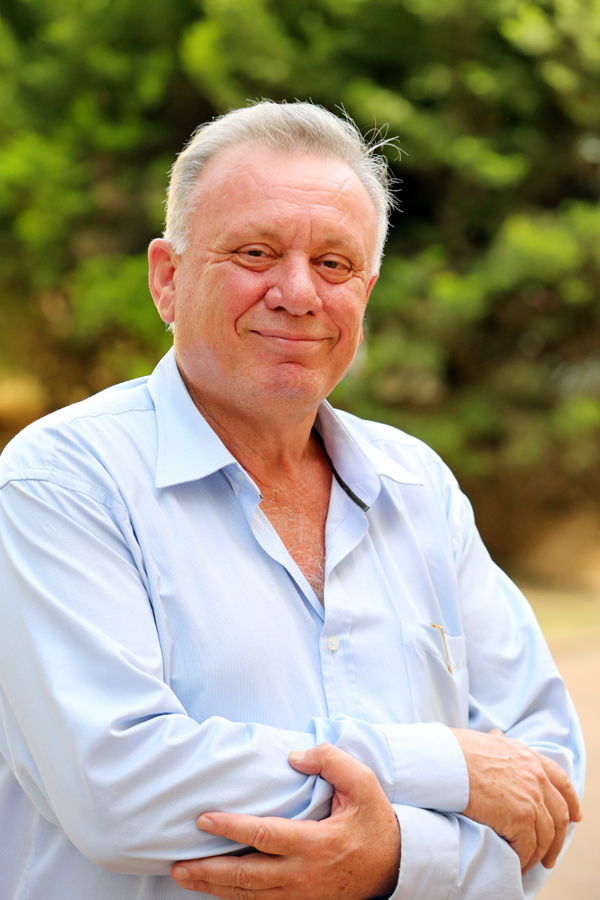
- Broshi in 2015

Faction represented in the Knesset
- 2015–2019: Zionist Union
- 2019: Labor Party

Personal details
- Born: 17 June 1950 (age 75); Gesher, Israel

Eitan Broshi (Hebrew: איתן ברושי; born 17 June 1950) is an Israeli politician who served as a member of the Knesset for the Zionist Union and Labor Party between 2015 and 2019.

== Biography ==
Originally from kibbutz Gesher, Broshi did his IDF national service in the Golani Brigade, fighting in the Yom Kippur War. He studied at Tel Aviv University, gaining a bachelor's degree in humanities and social science. He later became a member of kibbutz Gvat, serving as its secretary from 1985 until 1987. In 1999 he became head of Jezreel Valley Regional Council, a position he held until 2006. In 2006 he was appointed CEO of the Science, Culture and Sport Ministry, although he left the position the following year. In 2013 he became secretary of the Kibbutz Movement.

For the 2015 elections he was placed 18th on the Zionist Union list, an alliance of Labor and Hatnuah. He was elected to the Knesset as the alliance won 24 seats. In July 2018 he was suspended from the Labor Party following accusations of sexual harassment. Broshi subsequently threatened to sue party leader Avi Gabbay for libel. He did not stand in the April 2019 elections.

Broshi is married and has five children.
