= Saleh Saad =

Israeli Druze politician

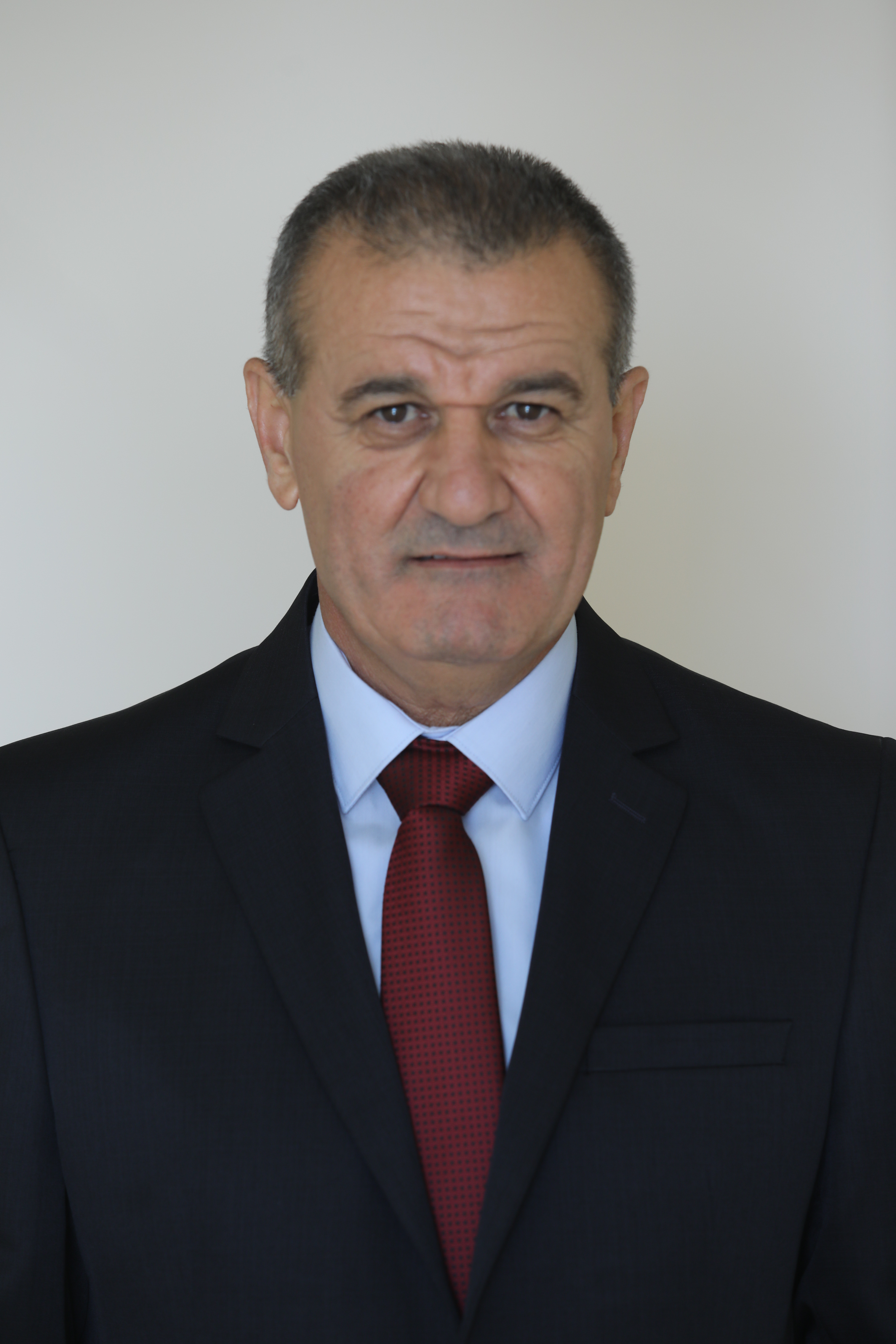

Faction represented in the Knesset
- 2017–2019: Zionist Union
- 2019: Labor Party

Personal details
- Born: 20 July 1963 (age 63) Beit Jann, Israel

Saleh Saad (Arabic: صالح سعد, Hebrew: סאלח סעד; born 20 July 1963) is a Druze Israeli politician. He served as a member of the Knesset for the Zionist Union and Labor Party between 2017 and 2019.

== Biography ==
Saad was born in Beit Jann, and served in the Israeli security forces as a combatant for twelve years. He became a director of the Galilee Local Council Workers Division, and was also chairman of the Galilee branch of the Histadrut. A member of the Labor Party, he was placed 25th on the party's list for the 2013 Knesset elections, However, he failed to win a seat.

Prior to the 2015 Knesset elections, Saad was given the 26th place on the list of the Zionist Union (an alliance of Labor and Hatnuah), a spot reserved for a Druze candidate. Although the alliance won only 24 seats, Saad entered the Knesset on 3 October 2017 as a replacement for Manuel Trajtenberg, who had retired from politics. He was placed seventeenth on the Labor list for the April 2019 elections, but the party won only six seats.
