= Yael Cohen Paran =

Israeli environmentalist and politician

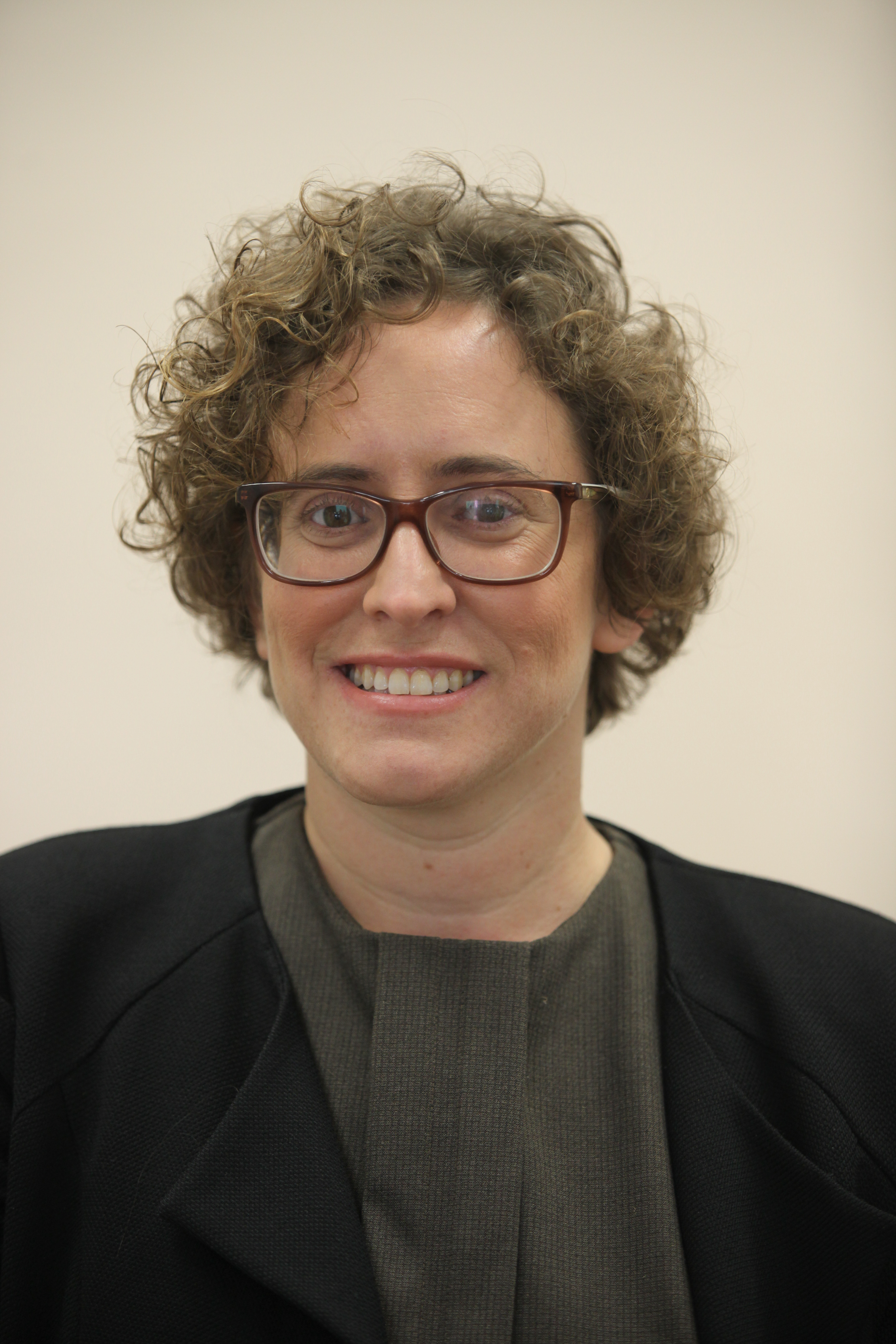
- Cohen Paran in 2024

Faction represented in the Knesset
- 2015–2019: Zionist Union
- 2019: Hatnua

Personal details
- Born: 12 October 1973 (age 52)

Yael Cohen Paran (Hebrew: יעל כהן-פארן; born 12 October 1973) is an Israeli environmentalist and politician, and co-chair of the Green Movement. She was a member of the Knesset for the Zionist Union and Hatnua from 2015 to 2019.

== Biography ==
During her national service in the Israel Defense Forces Cohen Paran was an intelligence officer in Unit 8200. She studied for a bachelor's degree in physics at the Hebrew University of Jerusalem, before starting a master's degree at Ben-Gurion University of the Negev. However, she then moved to Tel Aviv University to study for a master's in public policy.

In 2007 Cohen Paran established the Israel Energy Forum, becoming its CEO. She represented Israel at the 2002, 2007 and 2009 United Nations Climate Change Conferences.

She joined the Green Movement, and was placed eighth on the joint Meimad–Green Movement list for the 2009 Knesset elections, but the alliance failed to win a seat. In July 2013 she became co-chair of the Green Movement. Prior to the 2015 elections she was placed 25th on the Zionist Union list, a slot reserved for a candidate chosen by Hatnuah leader Tzipi Livni. Although the alliance only won 24 seats, she entered the Knesset on 25 November 2015 as a replacement for Danny Atar, after he was elected head of the Jewish National Fund. Prior to the April 2019 Knesset elections she was placed 16th on the Labor Party list, but lost her seat as Labor won only six seats.
