= Ayelet Nahmias-Verbin =

Israeli politician

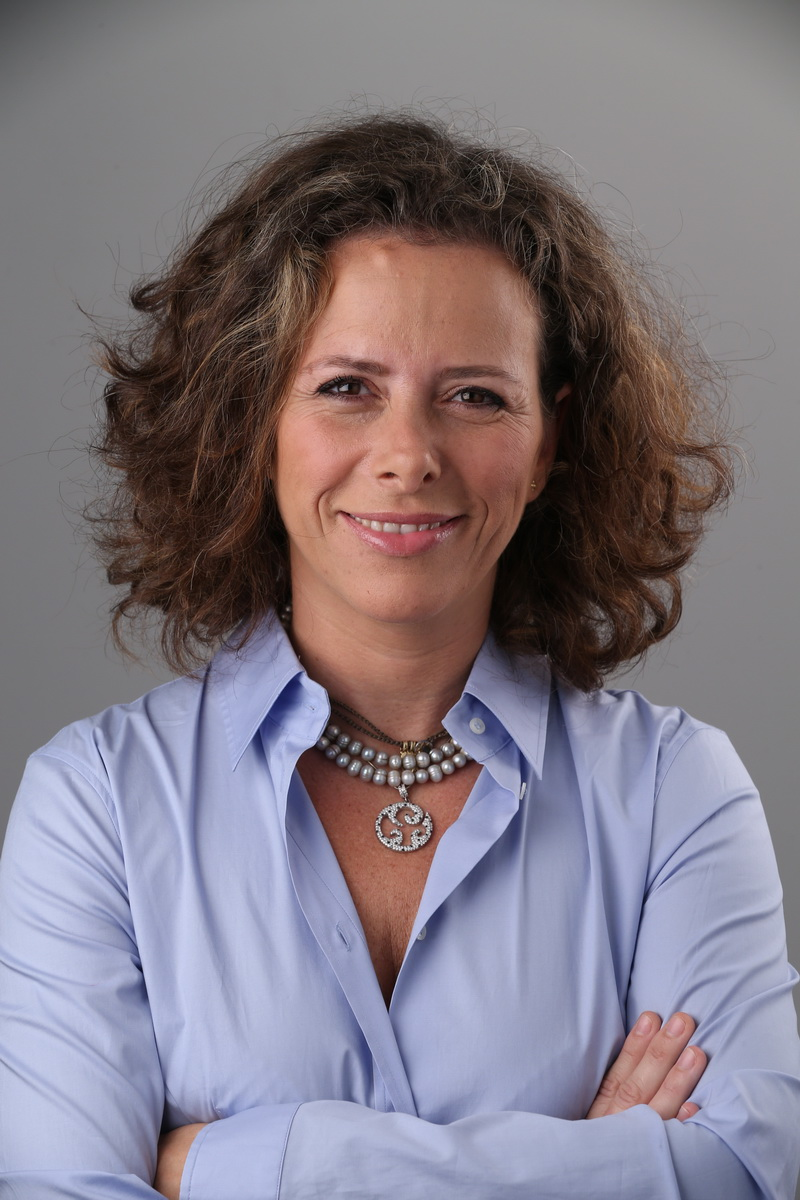
- Nahmias-Verbin in 2012

Faction represented in the Knesset
- 2015–2019: Zionist Union
- 2019: Labor Party

Personal details
- Born: 19 June 1970 (age 56) Tel Aviv, Israel

Ayelet Nahmias-Verbin (Hebrew: אַיֶילֶת נַחְמִיָּאס־וֶרְבִּין; born 19 June 1970) is an Israeli lawyer and politician. She served as a member of the Knesset for the Zionist Union and the Labor Party between 2015 and 2019.

== Biography ==
Ayelet Nahmias-Verbin was born and raised in Tel Aviv. She studied law at the Hebrew University of Jerusalem. She lives in Jaffa and is married with three children. Her father-in-law is a former mayor of Ramat HaSharon.

In 1991 she joined the Labor Party, and later became assistant legal advisor to Prime Minister Yitzhak Rabin. After Rabin was assassinated in 1995 she became chair of Tavlit, an irrigation company.

She placed 22nd on the Zionist Union list (an alliance of Labor and Hatnuah) for the 2015 Knesset elections, and was elected to the Knesset as the alliance won 24 seats. She did not contest the April 2019 elections.
