= Revital Swid =

Israeli lawyer and politician

- רויטל סויד
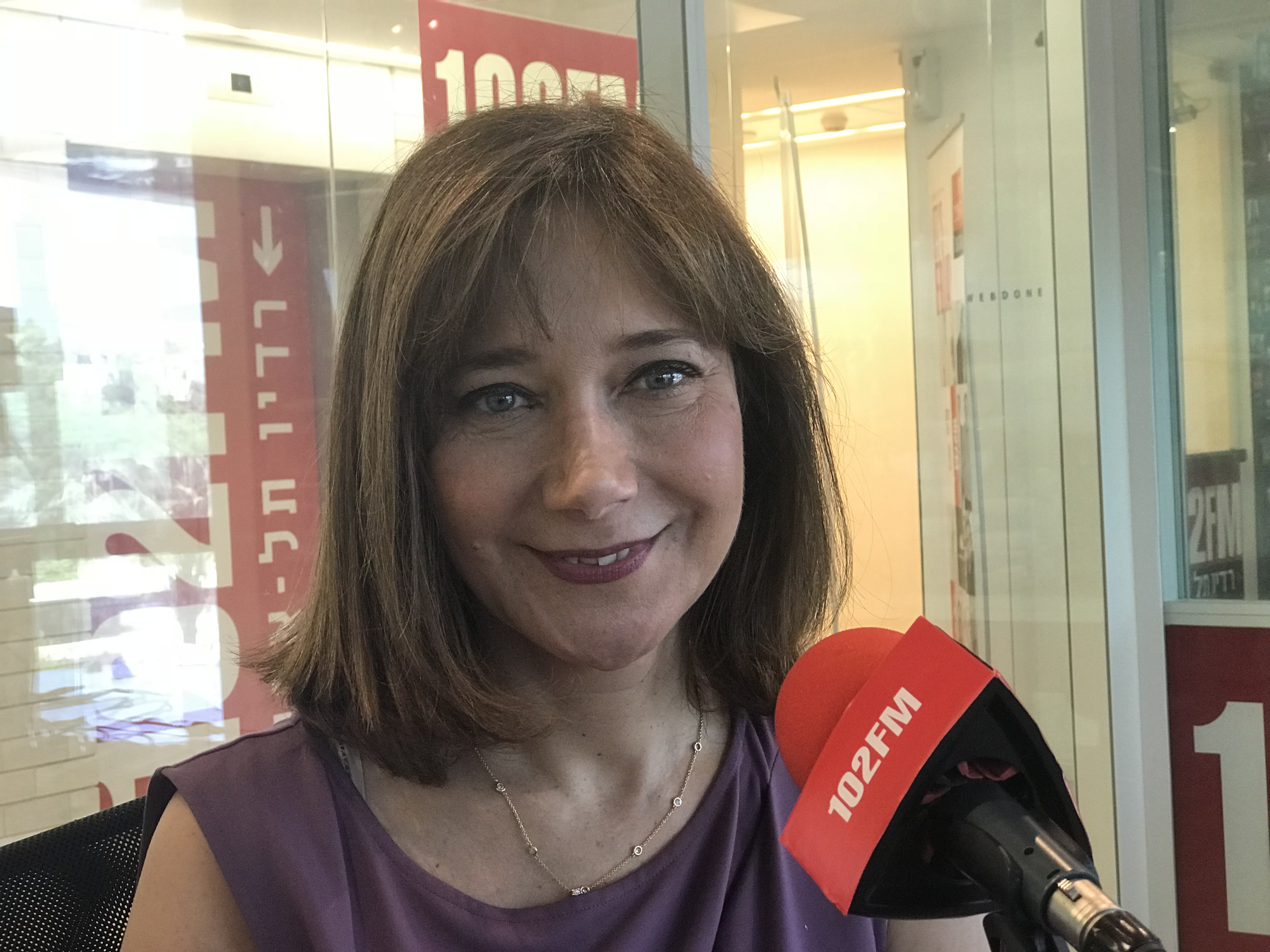

Faction represented in the Knesset
- 2015–2019: Zionist Union
- 2019–2020: Labor Party

Personal details
- Born: 17 August 1967 (age 59) Hadera, Israel

Revital Swid (Hebrew: רויטל סויד; born 17 August 1967) is an Israeli criminal defense lawyer and politician. She served as a member of Knesset for the Zionist Union and serves as a member of the Labor Party.

== Biography ==
Swid was born in Hadera, Israel, to Yosef and Bruria (née Castel) Maimon. Her father was a Libyan-Jewish immigrant to Israel while her mother was the scion of Sephardi Jewish family native to Jerusalem which had participated in the founding of Hadera. She completed her BA and MA in law at Bar-Ilan University. She later interned in the criminal division of the Tel Aviv District Attorney's Office. For several years she worked as an attorney in Netanya. In 1994 she served for several months as General Counsel of the Hillel Yaffe Medical Center in Hadera. That same year, she founded an independent law firm. Among its clients were the Abutbul family, members of the Israeli mafia.

She came to notoriety as a defense attorney during the murder trial of Ronnie Ron and Marie-Charlotte Pizem for the killing of 4-year-old Rose Pizem in 2008.

Swid is chair of the Criminal Affairs Division of the Tel Aviv District of the Israel Bar Association. She is an adjunct professor at Sha'arei Mishpat College and serves as a consultant to private companies in matters of criminal law.

A member of the Labor Party, she was elected to the fourteenth slot on the Zionist Union list for the 2015 Knesset elections. She was elected to the Knesset after winning the April and September 2019 elections. However, she lost her seat after placing 10 in the Labor-Gesher-Meretz list in the 2020 Israeli legislative election.

An observant Jew, Swid is a mother of four and lives in Ra'anana. She is a religious feminist.
