= Adi Koll =

Israeli social activist and former politician

- עדי קול
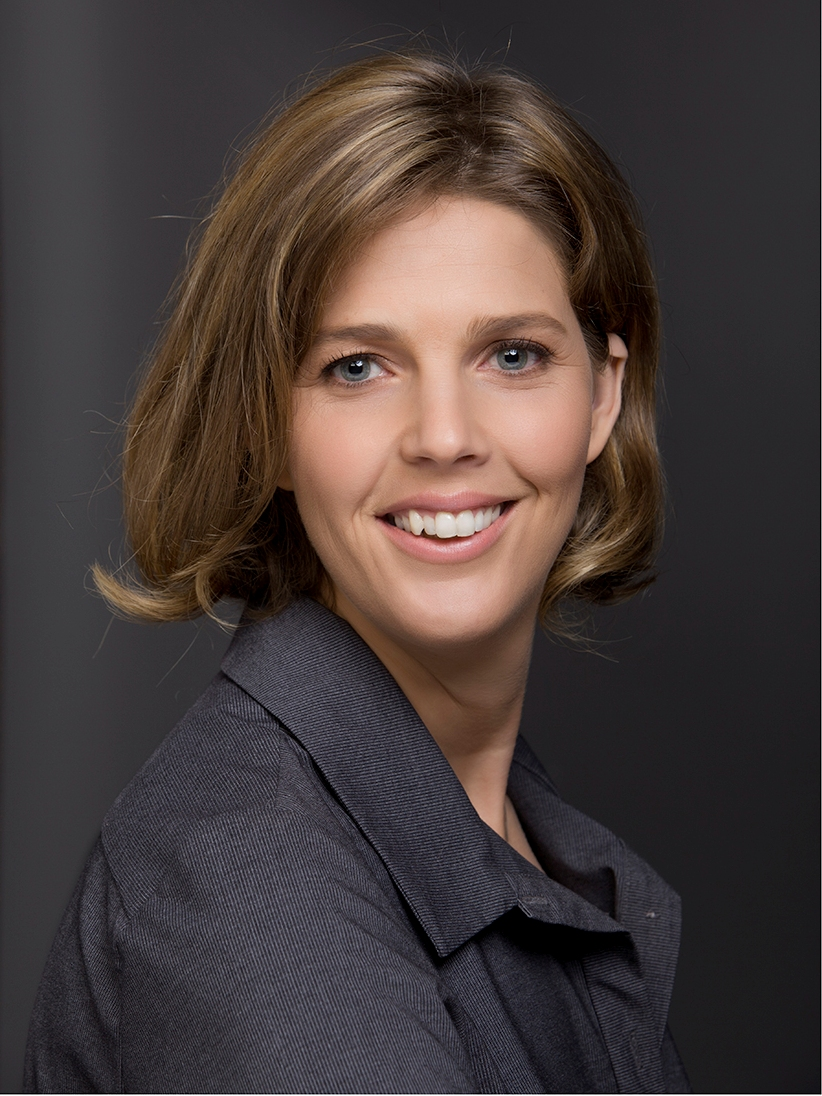
- Koll in 2012

Faction represented in the Knesset
- 2013–2015: Yesh Atid

Personal details
- Born: 19 March 1976 (age 50) Jerusalem

Adi Koll (Hebrew: עדי קול; born 19 March 1976) is an Israeli social activist and former politician. She served as a member of the Knesset for Yesh Atid between 2013 and 2015.

== Biography ==
Koll studied for a bachelor's degree in law at the Hebrew University of Jerusalem, where she established a careers centre. She later obtained an LLM and a JSD in law at Columbia University. In 2005 she started working as a lecturer at Tel Aviv University, and was also a member of the faculty at Ben-Gurion University of the Negev from 2009 until 2013. She founded the University of the People, which provides free university courses taught by students at Tel Aviv University.

She joined the new Yesh Atid party in 2012 and was placed ninth on the party's list for the 2013 Knesset elections. She entered the Knesset after the party won 19 seats. In December 2014 she announced that she would not stand in the 2015 elections, and would return to the education field.

Koll lives in Tel Aviv.
