= Rina Frenkel =

Israeli politician

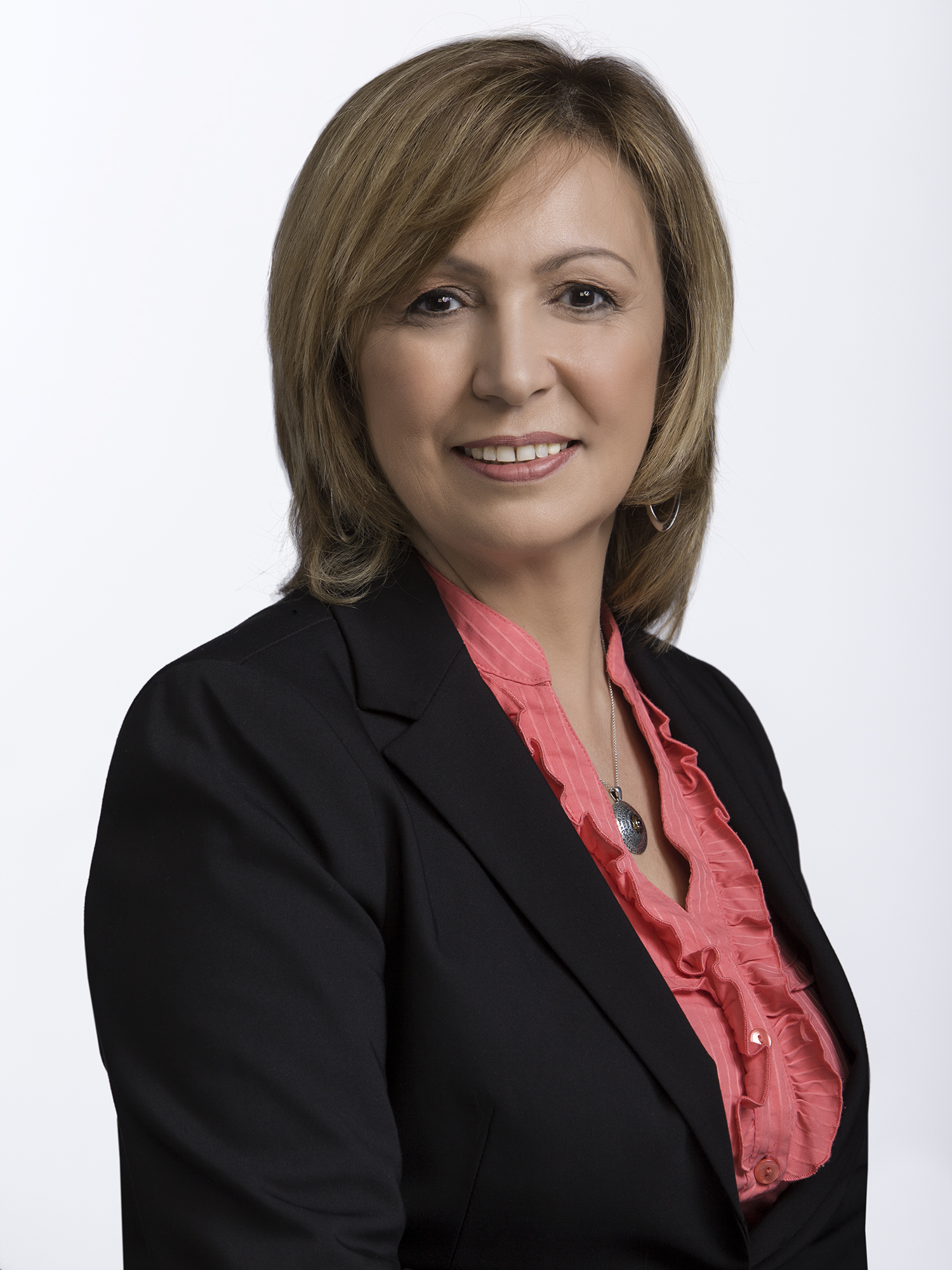
- Frenkel in 2012

Faction represented in the Knesset
- 2013–2015: Yesh Atid

Personal details
- Born: 17 September 1956 (age 70) Smolensk, Soviet Union

Rina Frenkel (Hebrew: רינה פרנקל; born 17 September 1956) is an Israeli politician. She served as a member of the Knesset between 2013 and 2015.

== Biography ==
Born in the Smolensk in the Soviet Union (today in Russia), Frenkel immigrated to Israel in 1990. A resident of Nahariya, Frenkel is employed as the assistant director of a training and employment organisation in Ma'alot-Tarshiha covering northern Israel.

Prior to the 2013 Knesset elections she joined the new Yesh Atid party and was placed fifteenth on its list. She was elected to the Knesset as the party won 19 seats. In January 2015 she announced that she would not contest the 2015 elections and instead would work for the party outside of the Knesset.
