= Leah Fadida =

Israeli politician

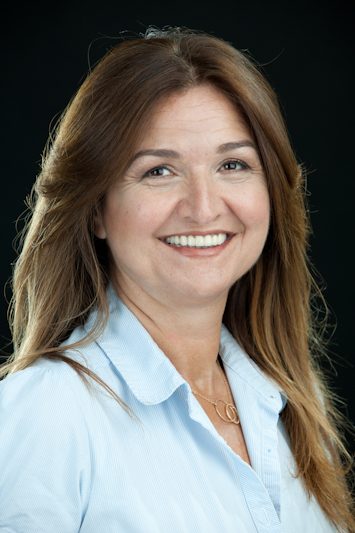
- Fadida in 2012

Faction represented in the Knesset
- 2017–2019: Zionist Union
- 2019: Labor Party

Personal details
- Born: 6 September 1968 (age 58) Haifa, Israel

Leah Fadida Ben Sheetrit (Hebrew: לאה פדידה; born 6 September 1968) is an Israeli politician. She served as a member of the Knesset for the Zionist Union and the Labor Party between 2017 and 2019.

== Biography ==
Fadida was born in Haifa; her mother was an immigrant from Romania and her father was an immigrant from Morocco. She grew up in the Hativat Carmeli neighbourhood of Haifa. She studied for a BA in social science at the Open University of Israel before gaining a master's degree in public policy at Tel Aviv University. She also studied wilderness management at the University of Montana and worked for the forestry section of the Jewish National Fund in northern Israel. She went on to become director of the JNF's public relations department. In the late 1990s she was elected to Yokneam Illit City Council, serving as deputy mayor from 2002 until 2017.

A member of the Labor Party, Fadida was placed 32nd on the party's list for the 2013 Knesset elections, but failed to win a seat. Prior to the 2015 Knesset elections she was placed 27th on the list of the Zionist Union, an alliance of Labor and Hatnuah. Although the alliance won only 24 seats, Fadida entered the Knesset on 6 October 2017 as a replacement for Erel Margalit, who returned to the business world after losing the party leadership election to Avi Gabbay. She was placed nineteenth on the Labor list for the April 2019 elections, but the party won only six seats.

Fadida is married with two children and lives in Yokneam Illit.
