= Ksenia Svetlova =

Israeli politician, journalist and public policy researcher

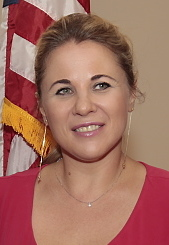
- Svetlova in 2015

Faction represented in the Knesset
- 2015–2019: Zionist Union
- 2019: Hatnua

Personal details
- Born: 28 July 1977 (age 49) Moscow, Russian SFSR, Soviet Union

Ksenia Svetlova (Hebrew: קסניה סבטלובה, Russian: Ксения Игоревна Светлова; born 28 July 1977) is an Israeli politician, journalist, associate professor at the Hebrew University of Jerusalem and policy fellow at the Israeli Institute for Regional Foreign Policies. She served as a member of the Knesset for the Zionist Union.

== Personal life ==
Svetlova was born in Moscow. In 1991, at age 14, she immigrated to Israel with her mother. Her mother said that the only country they could immigrate to was Israel, stating: "If we must leave our beloved city, our native Moscow, then we can only leave it for home."

In Israel, Svetlova attended Tzvia school for girls Jerusalem. She later studied Islamic and Middle Eastern history at Hebrew University of Jerusalem, earning Bachelor's and Master's degrees. As of 2015, she is a doctoral candidate in Middle Eastern studies at Bar-Ilan University. She is also a nonresident senior fellow at the Atlantic Council.

Svetlova had both Russian and Israeli citizenship. As a result of her Russian citizenship, while she was a journalist, she was able to travel extensively in the Arab world. However, in 2015, she renounced her Russian passport as a requirement for entering the Knesset, which she described as a career sacrifice. She speaks Russian, Hebrew, English, and Arabic. She lives in Modi'in with her husband Anatoly Aliev and has three daughters.

== Journalism career ==
In 2002, Svetlova joined the Russian language "Israel Plus" channel as a commentator on Arab affairs. She has written for newspapers and media outlets, including the Jerusalem Post, the Jerusalem Report, Haaretz and the BBC Russian Service. In her capacity as a journalist, she has interviewed Yasser Arafat, Ahmed Yassin, and Mahmoud Abbas.

== Political career ==
Before the 2015 Knesset elections, Svetlova joined the Zionist Union (an alliance of the Labor Party and Hatnuah) and was placed 21st on the list, a slot reserved for a candidate chosen by Hatnuah leader Tzipi Livni. She was elected to the Knesset as the alliance won 24 seats. After her election, she was required to give up her Russian citizenship, which had been an asset to her past travel to the Arab world.

In an i24news interview, Svetlova stated her priority as an incoming MK would be advancing the peace process. She also pledged to work against racism and discrimination. Once a Knesset member, she joined the Foreign affairs and Defense and Aliyah and Absorption committees, as well as heading three parliamentary caucuses: for the protection of the heritage and culture of Jews from Arab and Islamic countries, a caucus for freedom of speech and expression, and a caucus that supports strengthening the ties between Israel and the Kurdish nation.

Svetlova is an advocate for Progressive Judaism, after finding the Chief Rabbinate unhelpful when she was refused a divorce for two years.

She also serves as the executive director of the nonprofit organization Regional Organization For Peace, Economics & Security (ROPES).

=== Knesset positions ===
In the 20th Knesset, Svetlova served in the following positions:

- Chair, Lobby for Strengthening Relations between the State of Israel and the Kurdish people
- Chair, Lobby for the Preservation of the Culture of Jews from Islamic Countries
- Chair, Lobby for Freedom of the Press and Freedom of Expression
- Chair, Lobby for Consumer Protection
- Member, Lobby for Strengthening the Jewish World
- Member, Lobby for Strengthening Healthy Body Image among children, teenagers and young adults
- Member, Lobby for Fair Pension
- Member, Lobby of Religion and State
- Member, Lobby for the Status of Workers in Israel
- Member, Lobby for the Struggle Against the Delegitimization of the State of Israel
- Member, Lobby for Distributive Justice
- Member, Lobby for the Protection of Preschoolers in Israel
- Member, Lobby for the Unity of the Nation
- Member, Lobby for the Struggle Against Racism
- Member, Lobby for Fair Collection Processes at Hotzaa Lapoal (Israel`s collection agency)
