= Green Party (Israel) =

Israeli political party

The Green Party המפלגה הירוקה
- Leader: Stav Shaffir
- Chairperson: Yael Cohen Paran
- Founders: Eran Ben-Yemini, Alon Tal
- Founded: 2008
- Ideology: Green politics Green Zionism; Animal rights Environmentalism
- Political position: Centre-left to left-wing
- National affiliation: Green Movement–Meimad (2009); Democratic Union (2019–2020)
- International affiliation: Aytzim
- Slogan: Choosing Life
- Seats in Knesset: 0 / 120
- Most MKs: 1 (2015)

Election symbol
- ה

Website
- hayeruka.org.il

The Green Party (Hebrew: המפלגה הירוקה, HaMiflaga HaYeruka), formerly the Green Movement, is a social-environmental movement and political party in Israel. After briefly considering running independently in the 2020 Israeli legislative election, the party decided against it, realizing they had little to no chance of passing the 3.25% threshold needed to enter the Knesset. Stav Shaffir, the party's leader, urged supporters to vote for a left leaning party to help defeat Benjamin Netanyahu.

== History ==
The Green Movement (Hebrew: התנועה הירוקה, HaTnuʿa HaYeruka) was founded in the summer of 2008 by environmental activists such as Rami Livni and Shay Golub. It was led by Eran Ben-Yemini and Alon Tal. It soon formed a political party, and ran a joint list with Meimad, a dovish religious party, for the 2009 elections, after Meimad had ended its alliance with the Labor Party. Meimad leader Michael Melchior headed its list, and Ben-Yemini and Tal came in second and third place; former Shinui MK Meli Polishook-Bloch was also on its list, in eleventh place. In addition to the environment, the electoral slate's platform addressed issues of education, social democracy, religious pluralism, and co-existence. The campaign downplayed religious issues, and emphasized environmental questions. The alliance failed to win any seats in the Knesset after failing to pass the election threshold, receiving the largest number of votes of any party not to do so.

It contested the 2013 elections in an alliance with Tzipi Livni's party, Hatnua. Party leader Alon Tal was given the 13th spot on the party list. However, Hatnua only won 6 mandates. Following the election, there was a new leadership elected, with Yael Cohen Paran replacing Tal as co-chair.

It ran in the 2015 elections on a joint Zionist Union list with Hatnua and the Labor Party. Tzipi Livni chose Green Movement co-chair Yael Cohen Paran for the 25th spot (reserved for Hatnuah members) on the list. Paran missed out on being elected, but entered the Knesset following the resignation of another list member in November 2015.

Within the Knesset, the Movement's main focus is on toxic pollution in Haifa Bay and its effects on nearby neighbourhoods. Another focus is on air pollution. Paran is heading a parliamentary inquiry on renewable energy, pioneered a study on Israel becoming carbon-free, and is introducing legislation to require solar systems in high-rise buildings.

Prior to the September 2019 elections Stav Shaffir left the Israeli Labor Party after losing the leadership election to Amir Peretz. She joined the Green Movement, becoming its new leader. The party subsequently joined the Democratic Union alliance for the elections, receiving the 2nd and 8th spots on its list. Shaffir was elected to the Knesset as the alliance won four seats.

After a 2020 snap election was announced, Meretz decided to create an electoral pact with the Labor Party without the Greens.

In the build-up to the 2020 elections, the party was renamed the Green Party.

== Principles ==
The party's principles, as laid out by its website, are:

- Action for improving the lives, health, welfare, education, and prosperity of Israeli citizens.
- Responsibility and concern for the welfare, happiness, and prosperity of mankind, who shall live in a healthy, sustainable, and respectful environment in the present and in the future.
- Support for a pluralistic lifestyle, and respect for every human being, regardless of their religion, race, gender, or sexual orientation.
- Protection of the rights of animals and the helpless.
- Implementing the Green New Deal.

== Election results ==
Election	Leader	Votes	%	Seats	+/–	Status
2009	Eran Ben-Yemini	27,737 (#13); In alliance with Meimad)	0.82	0 / 120	New	Extraparliamentary
2013	Alon Tal	Ran on the Hatnua list		0 / 120	0	Extraparliamentary
2015	Yael Cohen Paran	Part of the Zionist Union		1 / 120	▲1	Opposition
April 2019	Yael Cohen Paran	Ran on the Labor Party list		0 / 120	▼1	Extraparliamentary
September 2019	Stav Shaffir	Part of the Democratic Union		1 / 120	▲1	Snap election
2020	Stav Shaffir	Did not contest				Extraparliamentary

== Leaders ==
Leader		Took office	Left office
1	Eran Ben-Yemini	2008	2010
2	Alon Tal	2010	2013
3	Yael Cohen Paran	2013	2019
4	Stav Shaffir	2019	Incumbent
