= Eyal Ben-Reuven =

Israeli general

- אייל בן ראובן
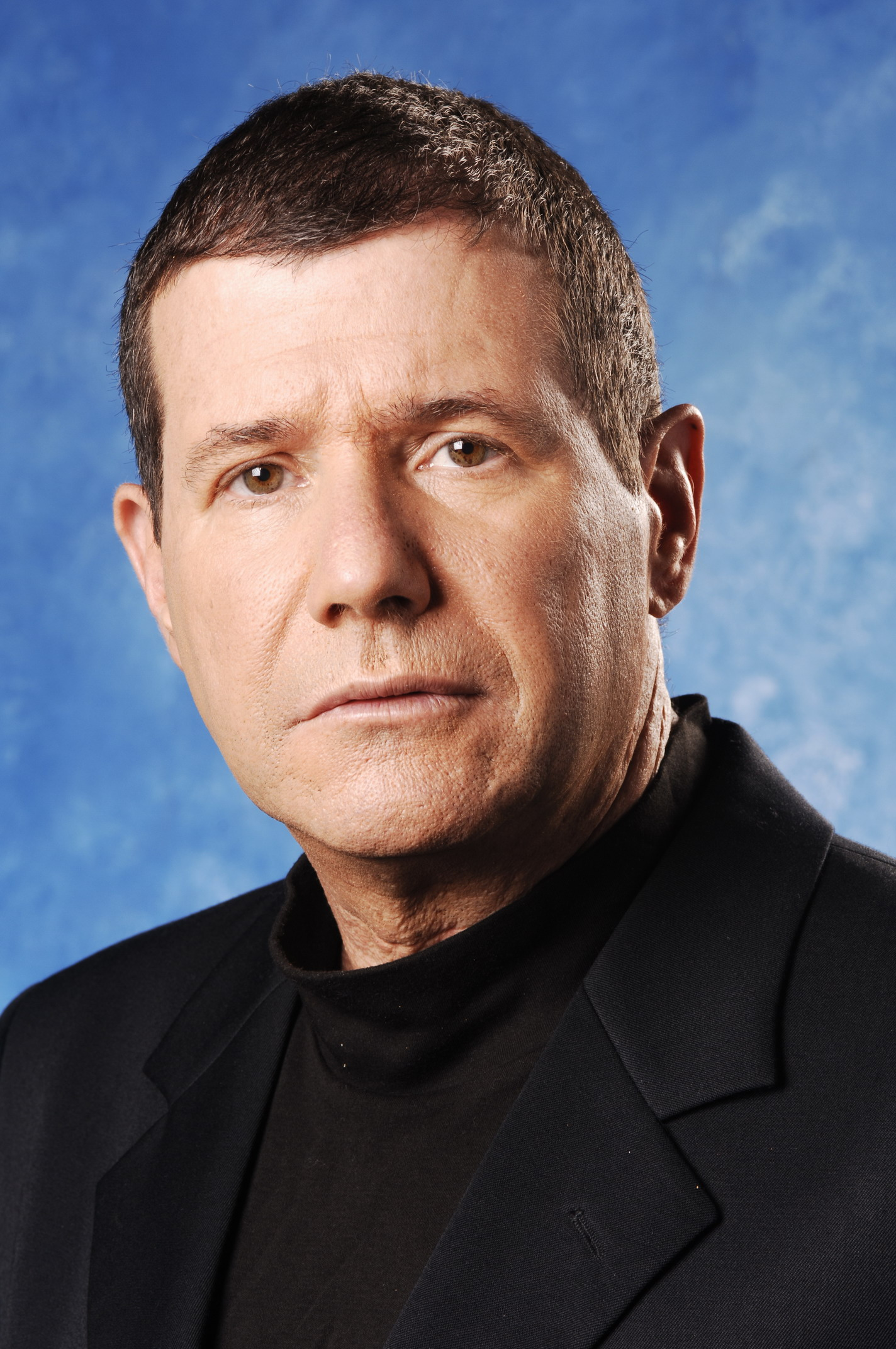

Faction represented in the Knesset
- 2015–2019: Zionist Union
- 2019: Hatnua

Personal details
- Born: 22 May 1954 (age 72) Netzer Sereni, Israel

Aluf Eyal Ben-Reuven (Hebrew: אייל בן ראובן; born 22 May 1954) is a retired major general in the Israel Defense Forces and commander of the IDF Military Colleges and senior field commander. He is the former deputy commander of the Northern Command, for which he still serves as a reserve.

== Military career ==
He enlisted in the IDF in 1972 as a member of the Armor Corps. Reuven participated in the 1973 Yom Kippur War, fighting both near the Suez Canal and at the Golan Heights. He commanded an armor battalion the 1982 Lebanon War. While in the IDF Reuven graduated from the IDF Command and Staff College and later studied at the U.S. Army War College in Carlisle, Pennsylvania. He has also received a B.A. in political science from the University of Haifa.

Ben-Reuven was the deputy commander of the Northern Command in the 2006 Lebanon War.

== Retirement from the military ==
After retirement from the army he became director of the Born to Freedom Foundation which worked (until 2012) to secure the release of Israeli prisoners of war.

After participating in many peace initiatives such as the Geneva Initiative, he joined the Meretz party. However, he never ran for a spot on the party's list. He quit Meretz in 2015 due to some disagreements with the party's outlook on the Palestinian issue. After discussing the peace process with Hatnuah chairwoman Tzipi Livni, he joined the Zionist Union, taking spot 24 on its list (reserved for Hatnuah members). In an interview for The Jerusalem Post, he said he hoped "to be a warrior for a peace agreement,...first with the Palestinians, then with other countries in the region. I can't guarantee there'll be peace tomorrow, but we must try." He is a critic of Israeli settler violence in the West Bank.
