= Zionist Union =

2014–2019 political alliance in Israel

Zionist Union המחנה הציוני
- Leader: Isaac Herzog (2014–2017); Tzipi Livni (2014–2019); Avi Gabbay (2017–2019)
- Founded: 10 December 2014
- Dissolved: 1 January 2019
- Headquarters: Tel Aviv, Israel
- Ideology: Zionism; Social democracy Social liberalism Progressivism; Green politics Factions: Labor Zionism; Liberal Zionism; Green Zionism
- Political position: Centre-left
- Alliance of: Labor Party; Hatnuah; Green Movement
- Colours: Blue, white, red

Election symbol
- אמת

Website
- hamahanehazioni.co.il

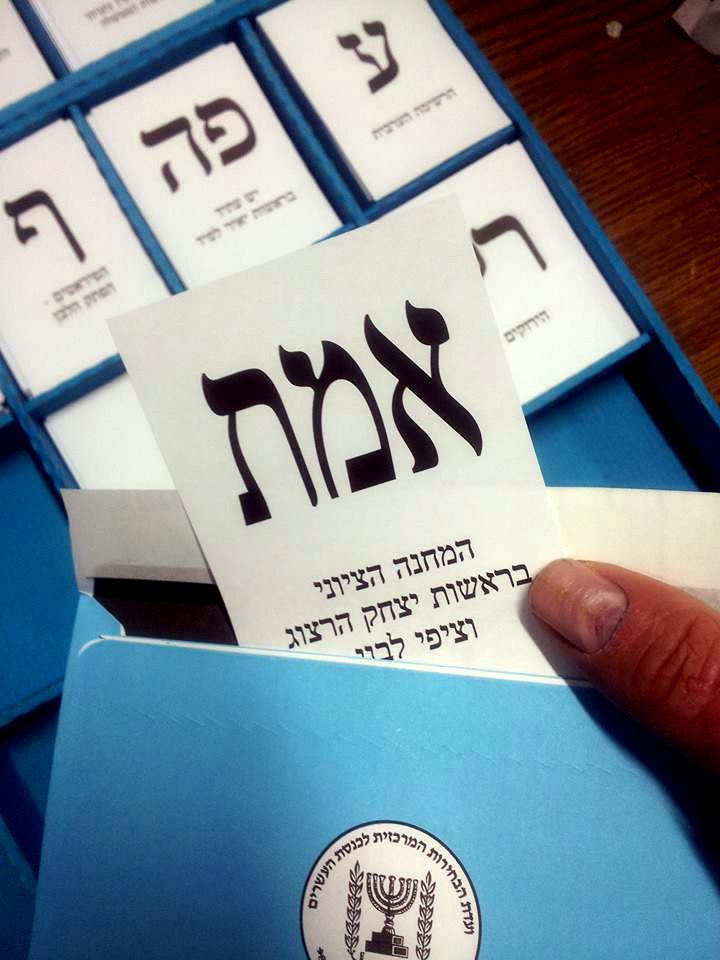
Ballot for the Zionist Union

The Zionist Union (Hebrew: הַמַחֲנֶה הַצִיּוֹנִי, romanized: HaMaḥaneh HaẒiyoni, lit. 'the Zionist Camp') was a centre-left political alliance in Israel. It was established in December 2014 by the Israeli Labor Party and Hatnuah to create a joint electoral list to contest the 2015 elections with the hope of unseating Prime Minister Benjamin Netanyahu. It failed to do so but did come in second place with 24 seats in the Knesset, forming the official opposition. However, tension between the Union's competing factions resulted in its dissolution in early January 2019, ahead of that year's April election.

== History ==
The Labor Party and Hatnuah agreed on 10 December 2014 to form a joint ticket. The list was established to create a large electoral list for the centre-left bloc, in the hope that it will lead the 34th government. Hatnuah leader Tzipi Livni has said that other parties will also be part of the alliance. Livni and Labor leader Isaac Herzog initially said that if the alliance were to win enough seats to lead the next government, they would rotate in the post of Prime Minister, with Herzog serving for the first half of the Knesset's four-year term and Livni for the second half, though Livni announced on 16 March 2015 that only Herzog would serve as prime minister.

Manuel Trajtenberg, number 11 on the list, was the list's candidate for the finance minister. Amos Yadlin was the list's candidate for the defense minister, though he was not a candidate for the Knesset. The Green Movement also had representation on the list through the addition of Yael Cohen Paran, selected by Livni, on a spot (No. 25) reserved for Hatnuah members.

After the 2015 election, the Zionist Union emerged as the second-largest party in the Knesset, with 24 seats. It triumphed in Tel Aviv and its prosperous suburbs, as well as other liberal areas. Its success was mostly in affluent areas, and it won the highest number of votes in 28 of Israel's 33 wealthiest communities.

In July 2018, Isaac Herzog left his position as party leader to join the Jewish Agency. Tzipi Livni took over the position and became leader of Zionist Union.

On 1 January 2019, party leader Avi Gabbay ended her allaince with Tzipi Livni, leading to the dissolution of Zionist Union.

== Composition ==
Name	Ideology	Position	Leader	20th Knesset
Labor	Social democracy	Centre-left	Isaac Herzog; Avi Gabbay	18 / 120
Hatnua	Liberalism	Centre to centre-left	Tzipi Livni	5 / 120
Green Movement	Green politics	Centre-left to left-wing	Yael Cohen Paran	1 / 120

== Ideology and platform ==
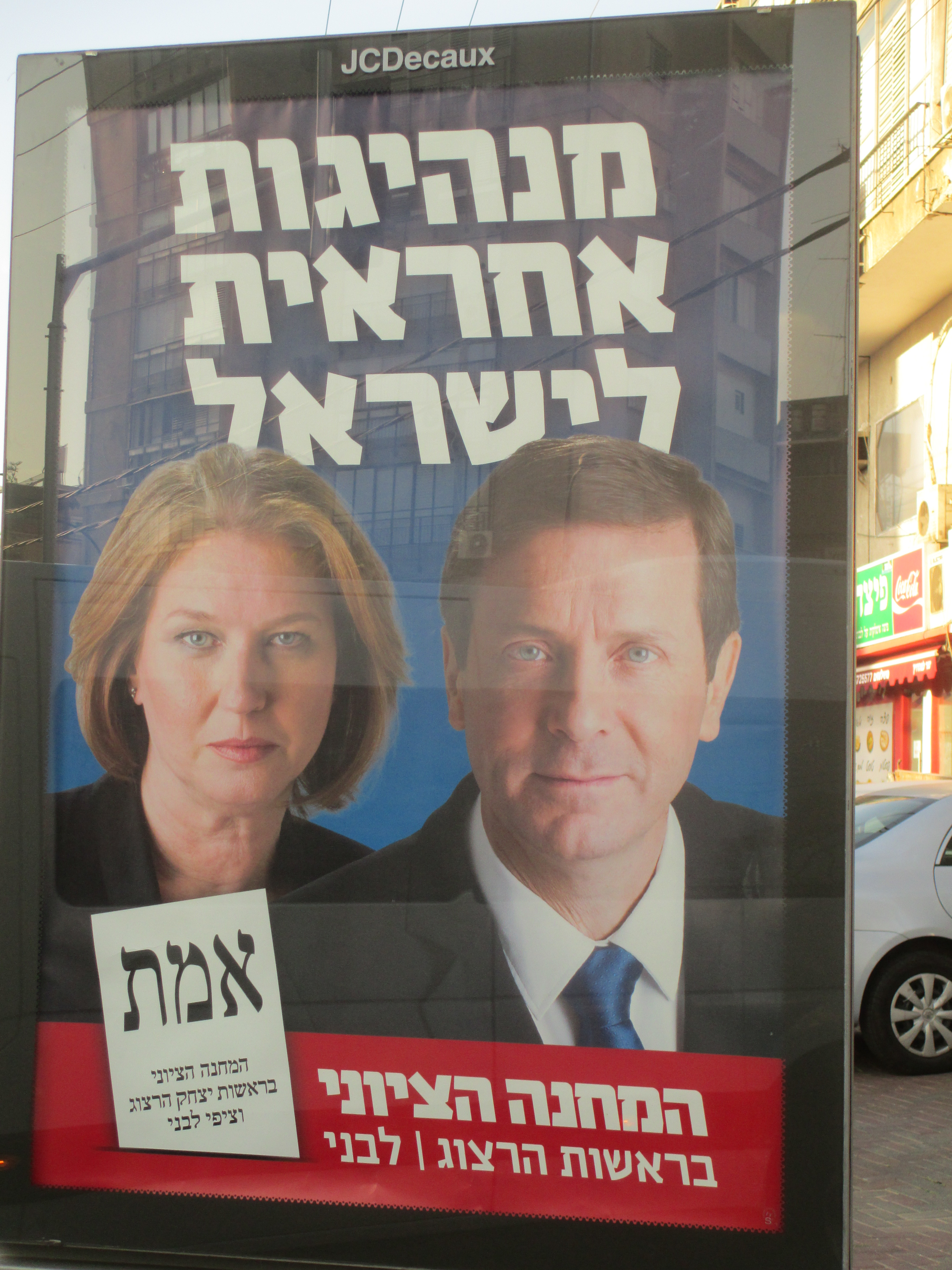
Zionist Union campaign poster

=== Main issues ===
Key issues for the Zionist Union included the following:

- Solving economic woes and reducing the cost of living
  - Tackling the housing crisis by providing land for free in the public domain for housing developments and increasing overall government expenditure
  - Reducing the costs of health care, education, and basic goods
  - Closing the gap between rich and poor
- Reigniting negotiations with the Palestinians
  - Initiating negotiations as part of a collective effort with regional allies Egypt and Jordan, before presenting a peace initiative to the Arab League
  - Shifting Israeli–Palestinian conflict resolution away from unilateral action (including that by the Palestinian Authority at UN agencies and the ICC) and back to a bilateral process supported by the international community
  - Halting construction in isolated settlements
- Repairing ties with the United States and the European Union

=== Other positions ===
In addition, the Zionist Union is in favor of the following:

- The enactment of green legislation
  - Dismantlement of "the gas monopoly"
  - Implementation of Clean Air Law measures
  - Removal of environmental hazards from the Haifa Bay by preventing the expansion of Oil Refineries Ltd. and evacuating the ammonia facility
  - Stronger protection for animal welfare
- Greater progress and pluralism on religion-and-state issues
  - Civil marriage in Israel, including for same-sex couples
  - Legal standing to non-Orthodox streams of Judaism
  - Partial operation of public transportation on Saturdays
- The legalization of medical marijuana

== Knesset members ==
Knesset term	Seats	Faction	Members
20th (2015–2019)	18	Labor	Isaac Herzog, Shelly Yachimovich, Stav Shaffir, Itzik Shmuli, Omer Bar-Lev, Yehiel Bar, Merav Michaeli, Eitan Cabel, Mickey Rosenthal, Revital Swid, Zouheir Bahloul, Eitan Broshi, Michal Biran, Nachman Shai, Ayelet Nahmias-Verbin, Yossi Yona, Saleh Saad, Leah Fadida
20th (2015–2019)	5	Hatnua	Tzipi Livni, Amir Peretz, Yoel Hasson, Ksenia Svetlova, Eyal Ben-Reuven
20th (2015–2019)	1	Green Movement	Yael Cohen-Paran

== Election results ==
Election	Leaders	Votes	%	Seats	+/–	Status
2015	Isaac Herzog; Tzipi Livni	786,313 (#2)	18.7	24 / 120	▲3 (Note: Based on total of member parties)	Opposition
