= Nachman Shai =

Israeli journalist and politician (born 1946)

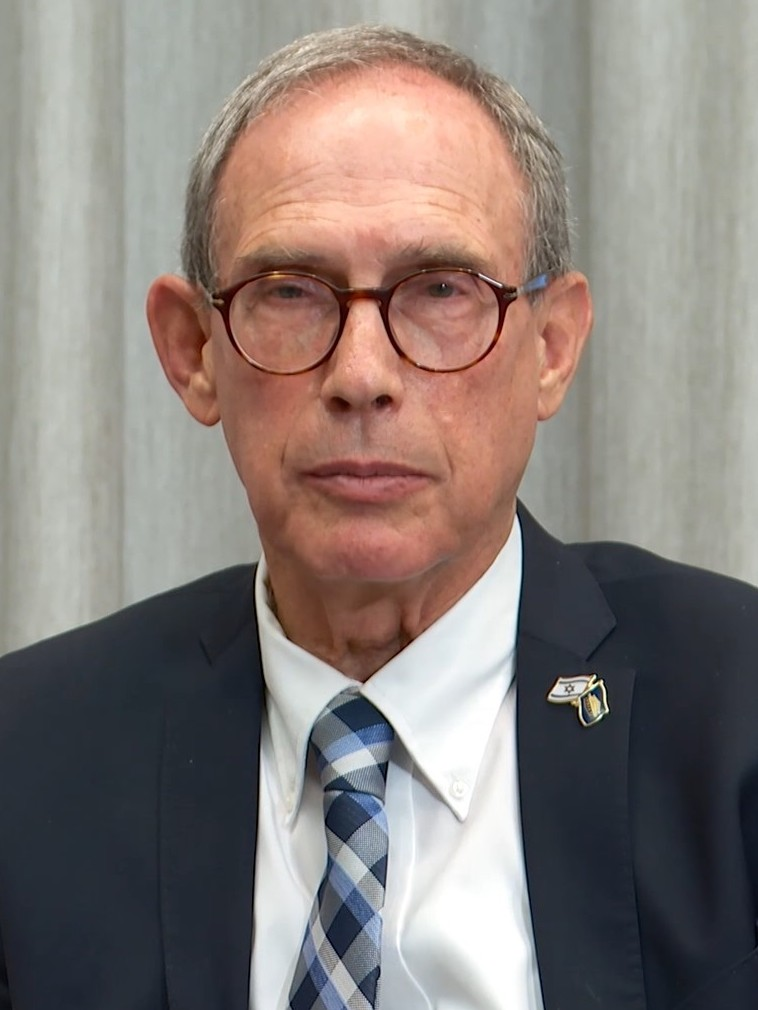
- Shai in 2018

Ministerial roles
- 2021–2022: Minister of Diaspora Affairs

Faction represented in the Knesset
- 2009–2013: Kadima
- 2013–2015: Labor Party
- 2015–2019: Zionist Union
- 2019: Labor Party

Personal details
- Born: 28 November 1946 (age 79) Jerusalem, Mandatory Palestine

Nachman Shai (Hebrew: נחמן שי; born 28 November 1946) is an Israeli journalist and politician who served as Minister of Diaspora Affairs. He previously served as a member of the Knesset and its Deputy Speaker, as well as the IDF spokesman. In April 2024 he was appointed Dean of the Hebrew Union College-Jewish Institute of Religion Taube Family Campus in Jerusalem.

== Biography ==
Born Nakhman Shaykevich in Jerusalem, Shai gained a BA in history and political science and an MA in communications from the Hebrew University of Jerusalem, where he also studied in the School of Business Administration. He studied communications at the World Press Institute in Minnesota, and worked as a research fellow in the Shorenstein Center in the JFK School of Government at Harvard University. In 2009 Nachman obtained a Ph.D. in political science and communications from Bar Ilan University and his thesis, on "Public Diplomacy and Low Intensity Conflict", was awarded the 2012 Tshetshik Prize for Security Studies by Tel Aviv University's Institute for National Security Studies.

During his service in the Israel Defense Forces he served in a Nahal unit, worked in Israel Army Radio as its commander and chief editor, and served as the IDF spokesman between 1988 and 1991, reaching the rank of Brigadier-General. During the Gulf War of 1991, when Israel was targeted by Iraqi missiles, his job was to calm Israelis in sealed rooms. He is remembered for instructing concerned citizens to "drink water".

In 1979 he became press secretary for the Israeli delegation to the United Nations in New York, and in 1981 he was named press consultant to Israel's Washington embassy. In 1991 he founded The Second Authority for Television and Radio and served as its Director General. He was also chairman of the board of directors of the Israel Television News Company, chairman of the Israel Broadcasting Authority (IBA) and Director General of the Ministry of Science, Culture and Sport. He later served as Senior Vice-President of United Jewish Communities (UJC) and Director-General of UJC Israel.

Prior to the 2009 elections he joined Kadima, saying "I think there is a time to come down from the stands and enter the playing field. I know the field well and I have been involved in many ways, but I decided this time to become a player". Kadima Chairwoman, Tzipi Livni, presented Shai at Kadima's Knesset faction, saying he was "part of the attractive face Kadima wants to show the electorate" and that he would be able to contribute to Kadima on issues pertaining to the Jewish world, Zionism and the Diaspora. Shai was placed eighteenth on the party list and entered the Knesset as the party won 28 seats.

Shai left to join the Labor Party prior to the January 2013 elections. Placed 14th on the party's list, he was re-elected as Labor won 15 seats.

In 2013 Shai published a book in Hebrew called Milḥamedia ("Media War") dealing largely with the treatment by the media of the Second Intifada.

Prior to the March 2021 elections Shai was placed eighth on the Labor Party list. He failed to enter the Knesset as the party won seven seats. When Israel's 36th government was formed, Labor leader Merav Michaeli named Shai her party's nominee for Minister of Diaspora Affairs; the nomination was confirmed on 12 June.
