= Michal Biran =

Israeli politician

- מיכל בירן
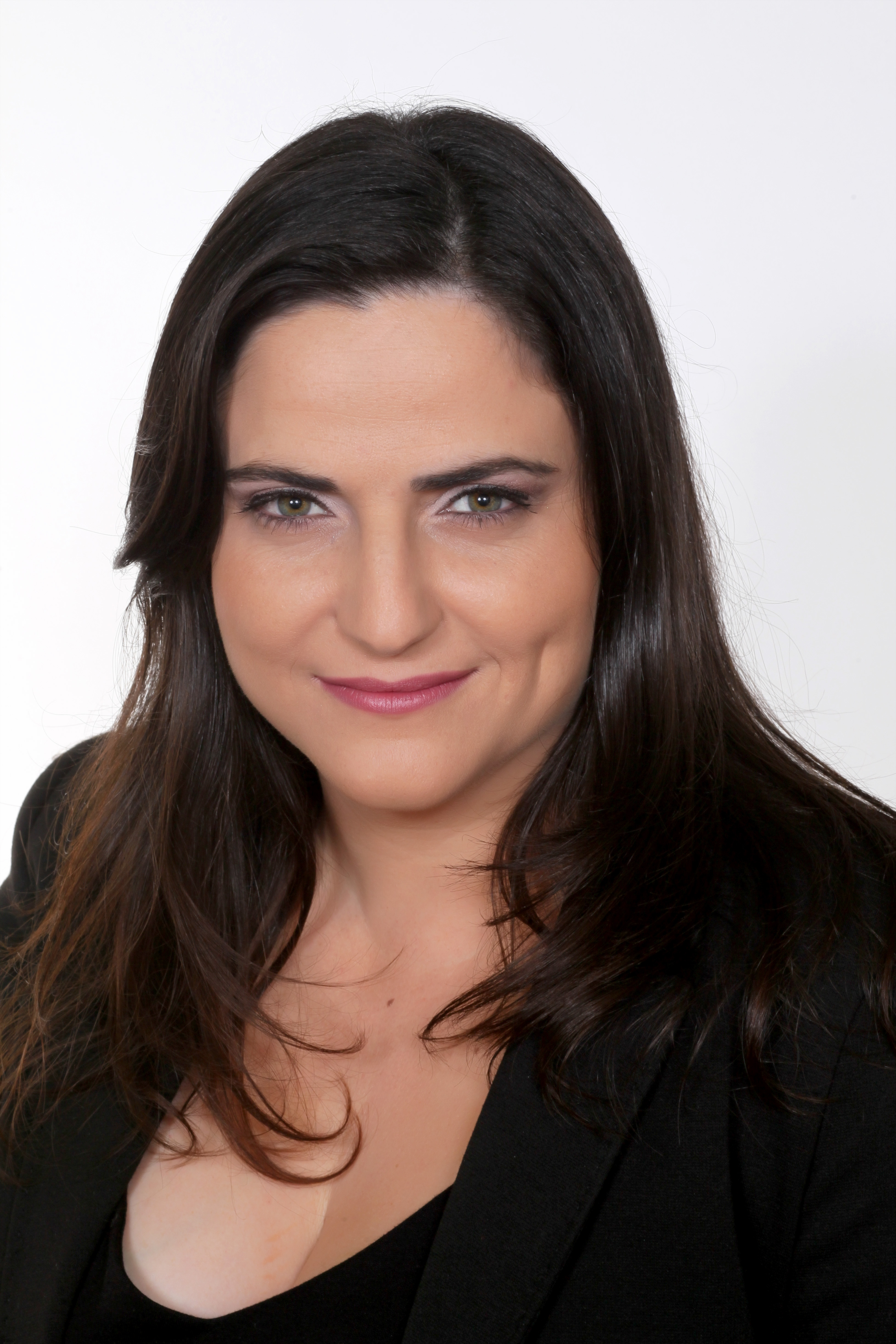

Faction represented in the Knesset
- 2013–2015: Labor Party
- 2015–2019: Zionist Union
- 2019: Labor Party

Personal details
- Born: 28 June 1978 (age 47) Hod HaSharon, Israel

Michal Biran (Hebrew: מיכל בירן; born 28 June 1978) is an Israeli politician. A member of the Labor Party, she was placed thirteenth on the party's list for the 2013 Knesset elections. She served in Knesset from 2013 to 2019, in the 19th and 20th Knessets.

A resident of Tel Aviv, Biran had worked as an assistant to Labor Party leader Shelly Yachimovich. At the time of her election to the Knesset Biran was working as a lecturer at Tel Aviv University, where she was also studying for a doctorate in political science.

In 2020 she started the Stork initiative to assist people in planning joint parenthood arrangements.
