= Manuel Trajtenberg =

Israeli economist (born 1950)

- מנואל טרכטנברג
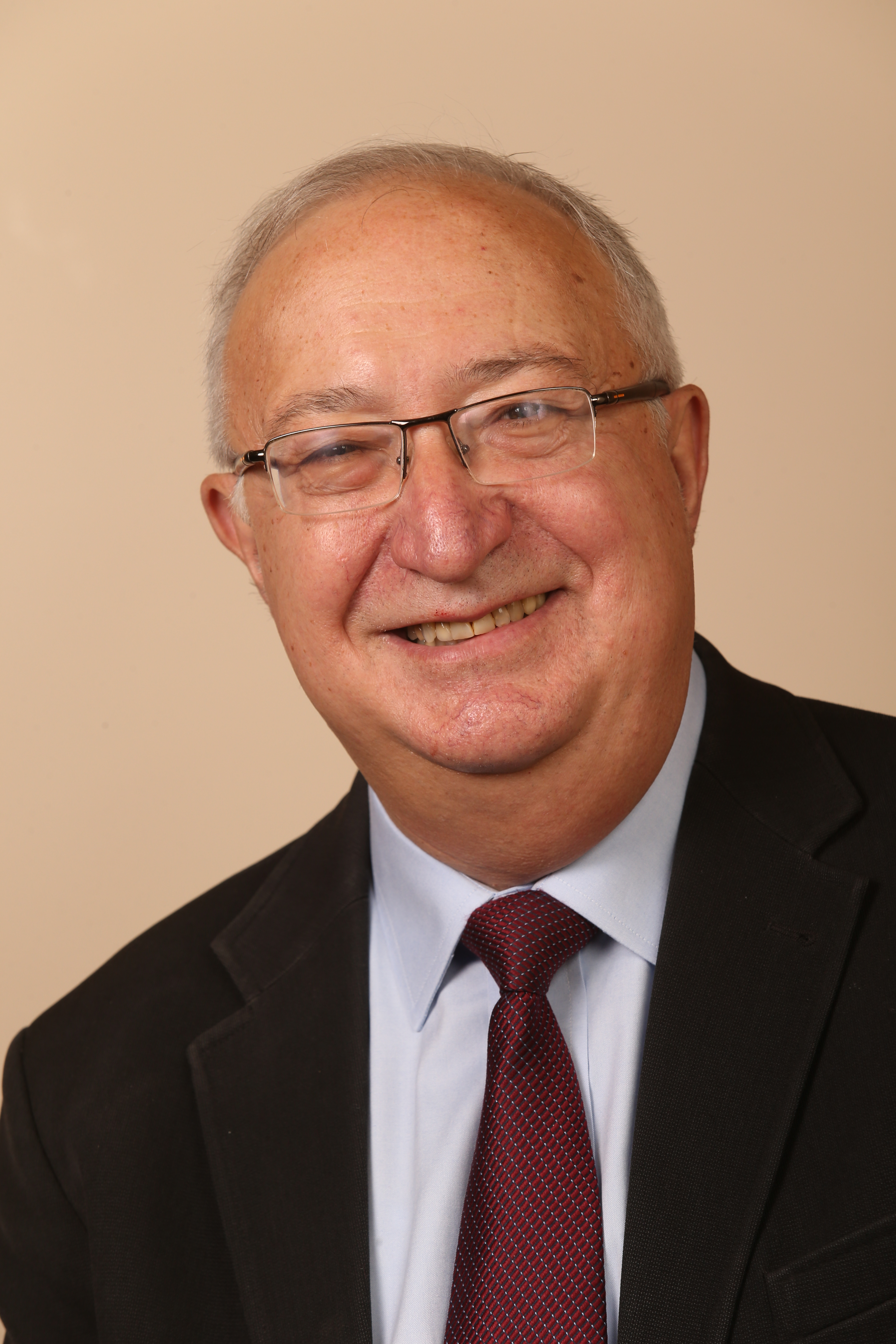
- Official portrait, 2015

Faction represented in the Knesset
- 2015–2017: Zionist Union

Personal details
- Born: 21 September 1950 (age 76) Córdoba, Argentina
- Citizenship: Israel
- Party: Yashar (since 2025)
- Other political affiliations: Labor (2014–2017); Independent (2017–2025)
- Spouse: Nadine Baudot-Trajtenberg
- Children: 3
- Education: Hebrew University of Jerusalem; Harvard University
- Occupation: Economist • Professor • Politician

Manuel Trajtenberg (Hebrew: מנואל טרכטנברג; born 21 September 1950) is an Israeli economist who was the chair of the Planning and Budgeting Committee of the Council for Higher Education in Israel. He was appointed by Israeli Prime Minister Benjamin Netanyahu in August 2011 to lead a committee for negotiations with the Israeli protesters and for recommending economic measures to overcome the crisis. He is currently the Executive Director of the Institute for National Security Studies (INSS).

Trajtenberg joined the Zionist Union list in December 2014 and was elected to the Knesset in 2015. However, he left politics in 2017.

== Biography ==
Trajtenberg was born in Córdoba, Argentina, and emigrated to Israel at the age of 16. He graduated from the Hebrew University of Jerusalem with a major in economics in 1973 and completed a master's degree in economics and sociology in 1976, from the same university. In 1984 he received his Ph.D. from Harvard University for work entitled "Economic Analysis of Product Innovation: The Case of CT Scanners." Upon completing his Ph.D., he returned to Israel, and has since been serving as a professor in the Tel Aviv University School of Economics.

Trajtenberg served in several public roles. He was a consultant to the Ministry of Industry, Trade and Labor and to the Prime Minister's Office. In 2006 he was appointed the first chair of the Israeli National Economic Council, a post from which he resigned in 2009. In 2011, he was appointed to head a committee for negotiating with the Israeli protesters and recommending economic measures to overcome the crisis.

Trajtenberg said the government ignored his committee's recommendations to alleviate the housing shortage and skyrocketing prices as those issues were highlighted in the Olim L'Berlin campaign in the summer of 2014.

He was elected to the Knesset in 2015 as part of the Zionist Union.

He is a member of Beit Daniel, Israel's flagship Reform congregation, in Tel Aviv.

In September 2017 Trajtenberg announced that he was resigning from the Knesset; he was replaced by Saleh Saad.
