= Zouheir Bahloul =

Israeli sports broadcaster

- زهير بهلول
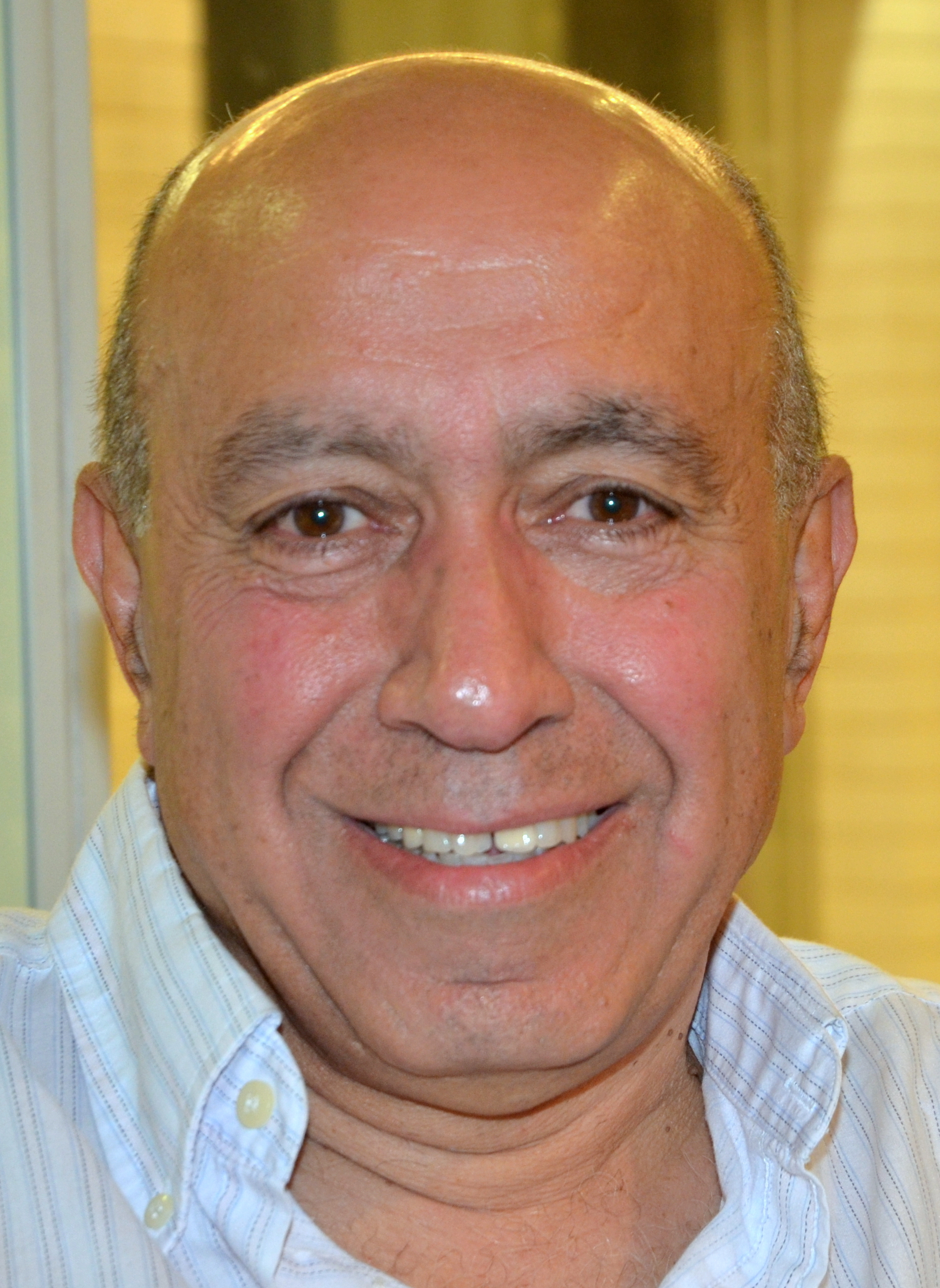

Faction represented in the Knesset
- 2015–2018: Zionist Union

Personal details
- Born: 24 December 1950 (age 75) Acre, Israel

Zouheir Bahloul (Arabic: زهير بهلول, Hebrew: זוהיר בהלול; born 24 December 1950) is an Israeli Arab sports broadcaster, journalist and politician. Currently, he works as presenter for Ashams Radio.

== Biography ==
Bahloul was born in 1950 in Haifa, Israel, to a Muslim Arab family. His mother, who was a journalist, was offered the opportunity to manage a Muslim orphanage in Acre, and the family subsequently moved there. In 1974, he was hired as a researcher at the Israel Broadcasting Authority. Later, he became a sports announcer. He broadcast various athletic competitions for radio and television on Channel 1.

While mainly working in sports broadcasting, Bahloul has also worked as a journalist, focused on promoting the Arab sector in Israel. During the 1990s he presented current events programs and talk shows in Arabic.

Bahloul, an avid vegan, was married to Jamila until her death in 2010, and has three children.

=== Political career ===
In December 2014, Bahloul joined the Israeli Labor Party. On 14 January 2015 he beat the member of Knesset and former minister Raleb Majadele for the minority slot in the party's primary elections and was subsequently placed 17th on the Zionist Union list for the 2015 Knesset elections. He stated that if elected, he would first focus on changing the national education system to foster more diversity and Jewish–Arab dialogue.

In a 9 February 2015, interview with Al-Monitor, Bahloul said he joined the Zionist Union, an alliance of Labor and Hatnuah, because he saw the Labor Party's potential to integrate "the Arab population in the state's affairs" and because Hatnuah leader Tzipi Livni had "stood like a bulwark against" anti-democratic legislation during her time as Justice Minister. He called on Arab parties to adopt a different strategy and demonstrate willingness to join a Labor-led coalition after the 2015 elections. He was subsequently elected to the Knesset when the Zionist Union won 24 seats in the March 2015 elections.

In October 2018, he resigned from the Knesset due to his opposition to the Basic Law: Israel as the Nation-State of the Jewish People.
