= Niven (disambiguation) =

Niven is a surname. It may also refer to:

== Given name ==
- Niven Abu Rahmoun (born 1981), Israeli Arab politician
- Niven Busch (1903–1991), American novelist and screenwriter
- Niven Govinden (born 1973), English novelist

== Other uses ==
- Niven (restaurant), a Michelin-starred restaurant in Rijswijk, Netherlands
- Jas J Niven & Co, later Niven Engineering, a New Zealand engineering business
- 12513 Niven, an asteroid

== See also ==
- Harshad numbers, also called Niven numbers
- Niven's constant, a mathematical constant
- Niven's theorem
- Niven's laws, named after Larry Niven
