= Niven =

Niven is a surname. It is derived from the Scottish Gaelic Mac Cnaimhin.

Notable people with the name include:

- Archibald C. Niven (1803–1882), American politician
- Alan Niven, New Zealand manager of Guns n Roses
- Alan Niven (soccer) (1955–1999), Australian soccer player
- Alastair Niven (1944–2025), British literary scholar and author
- Charles Niven (1845–1923), Scottish mathematician
- Colin Niven (1903–1968), Australian rules footballer
- David Niven (1910–1983), British actor and author
- David Niven, Jr. (born 1942), British actor, producer and executive, son of David
- Derek Niven (born 1983), Scottish footballer
- Frances Gamble (1949–1997), née Niven, South African climatologist and speleologist
- Frederick Niven (1878–1944), Canadian novelist
- George Niven (1929–2008), Scottish footballer
- Ivan M. Niven (1915–1999), Canadian–American mathematician
- James Niven (1851–1925), Scottish physician
- Jennifer Niven, American novelist
- Jimmy Niven (1861–1933), Scottish footballer
- John Niven (born 1966), Scottish writer
- John Niven (footballer) (1921–2011), Scottish football player
- Kip Niven (1945–2019), American actor and theater director
- Larry Niven (born 1938), American science fiction author
- Margaret Graeme Niven (1906–1997), English artist
- Ninian Niven (1799–1879), Scottish horticulturist and landscape gardener
- Paul K. Niven Jr. (1924–1970), American journalist
- Peter Niven (born 1964), Scottish jockey
- Ray Niven (1911–1992), Australian footballer
- Robert Niven (English cricketer) (born 1948), English cricketer
- Robert Niven (New Zealand cricketer) (1859–1919), New Zealand cricketer
- Robert Niven (soldier) (1853–1921), American officer awarded the Medal of Honor
- Stuart Niven (born 1978), Scottish footballer
- Thornton M. Niven (1806–1895), Scottish-American architect and stonecutter
- William Niven (1850–1937), Scottish mineralogist and archeologist
- William Davidson Niven (1842–1917), British mathematician and electrical engineer
- William Dickie Niven (1879–1965), ecclesiastical historian

== See also ==
- McNiven
- Nivan
