= Robert Niven =

Robert Niven may refer to:

- Robert Niven (English cricketer) (born 1948), English cricketer
- Robert Niven (New Zealand cricketer) (1859–1919), New Zealand cricketer
- Robert Niven (soldier) (1853–1921), American Civil War officer awarded the Medal of Honor
