= Kirkwood Estate, East Ayrshire =

Estate in Stewarton, East Ayrshire, Scotland

Coordinates: 55.6986°N 4.5252°W

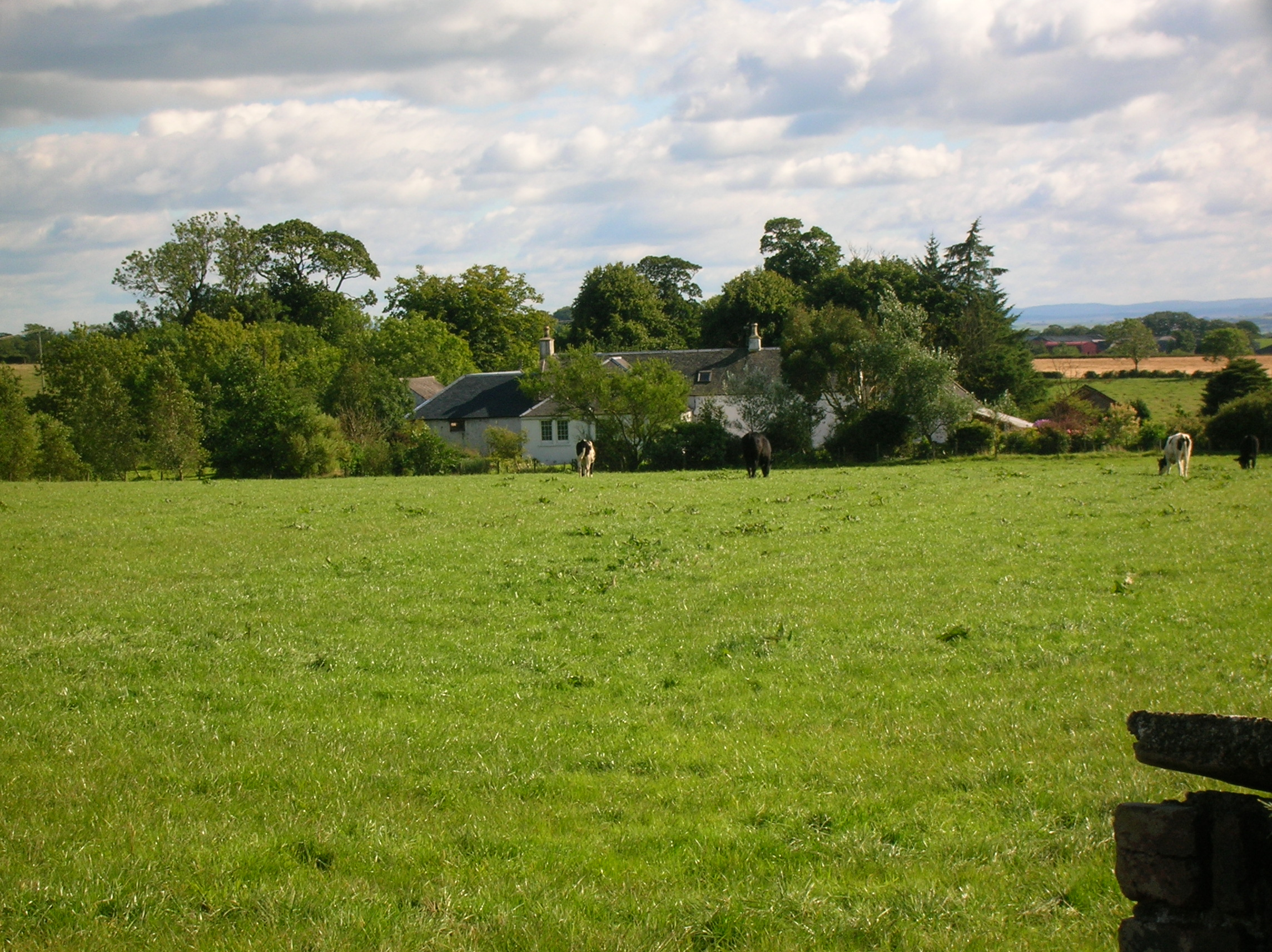
Kirkwood Farm from the road

The Lands of Kirkwood (NS3947) formed a small estate in the Parish of Stewarton, East Ayrshire lying between Stewarton and Dunlop, which in 1678 became part of the lands of Lainshaw, known as the Lainshaw, Kirkwood and Bridgehouse Estate. Kirkwood was anciently known as Bloak Cunninghame. Kirkwood remains as a farm in 2010.

== History ==
=== The lairds of Kirkwood ===
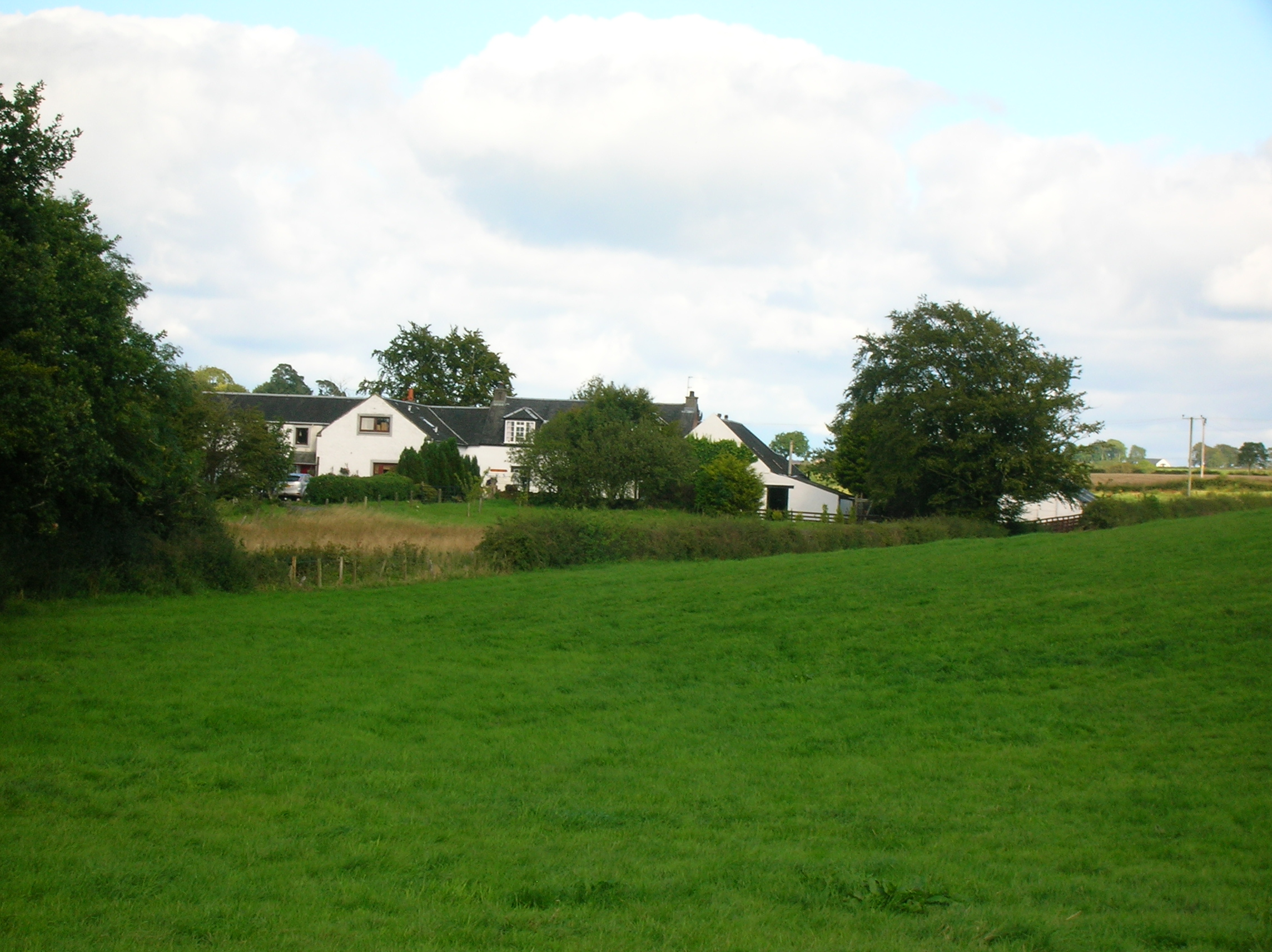
Townend of Kirkwood Farm

Kirkwood was the possession of the Niven family for several generations from circa 1532. John Niving (sic), a notary public held the property in the early 17th century and died in December 1616. His son, also John Niven, is on record in September 1606. The wife of John Niven was Kathrein Fairnlie and his children were Hew and Christiane Nevingis. In January 1635, James Nevein (sic) is on record as the heir to his grandfather James Nevein of Kirkwood in the two and a half merk land of Kirkwood.

Stephen Nevin, was the father of James Nevin, the first laird of Kirkwood. At Edinburgh, on 15 December 1543, Christine Boyd daughter of Patrick Boyd in Clerkland near Stewarton, married John Nevin son and heir apparent of James Nevin of Kirkwood. James had held the nearby lands of Nether Oldhall with mansion, houses, tenants, etc.

John Nevin, the third laird of Kirkwood, and Christine Boyd his wife, had a son John; the fourth laird of Kirkwood. In 1579 the estate of Oldhall was granted to Adam Cunningham of Colynane and Jean Mure his wife, which had been held by John Nevin son and heir of John Nevin of Kirkwood, and liferent of John the elder and Christian Boyd mother of the said John younger.

The marriage contract of John Nevin is dated 9 December 1580. The King granted to John Neving younger, son and heir apparent of John Nevin of Kirkwood, and Cristine Montomerie his wife, half of the 2½ mercates of the lands of Kirkwood. John Elder resigned personally in favour of John Younger and Cristine. John elder and Cristine Boyd his wife kept the free tenement of one half of the lands with the dwelling house.

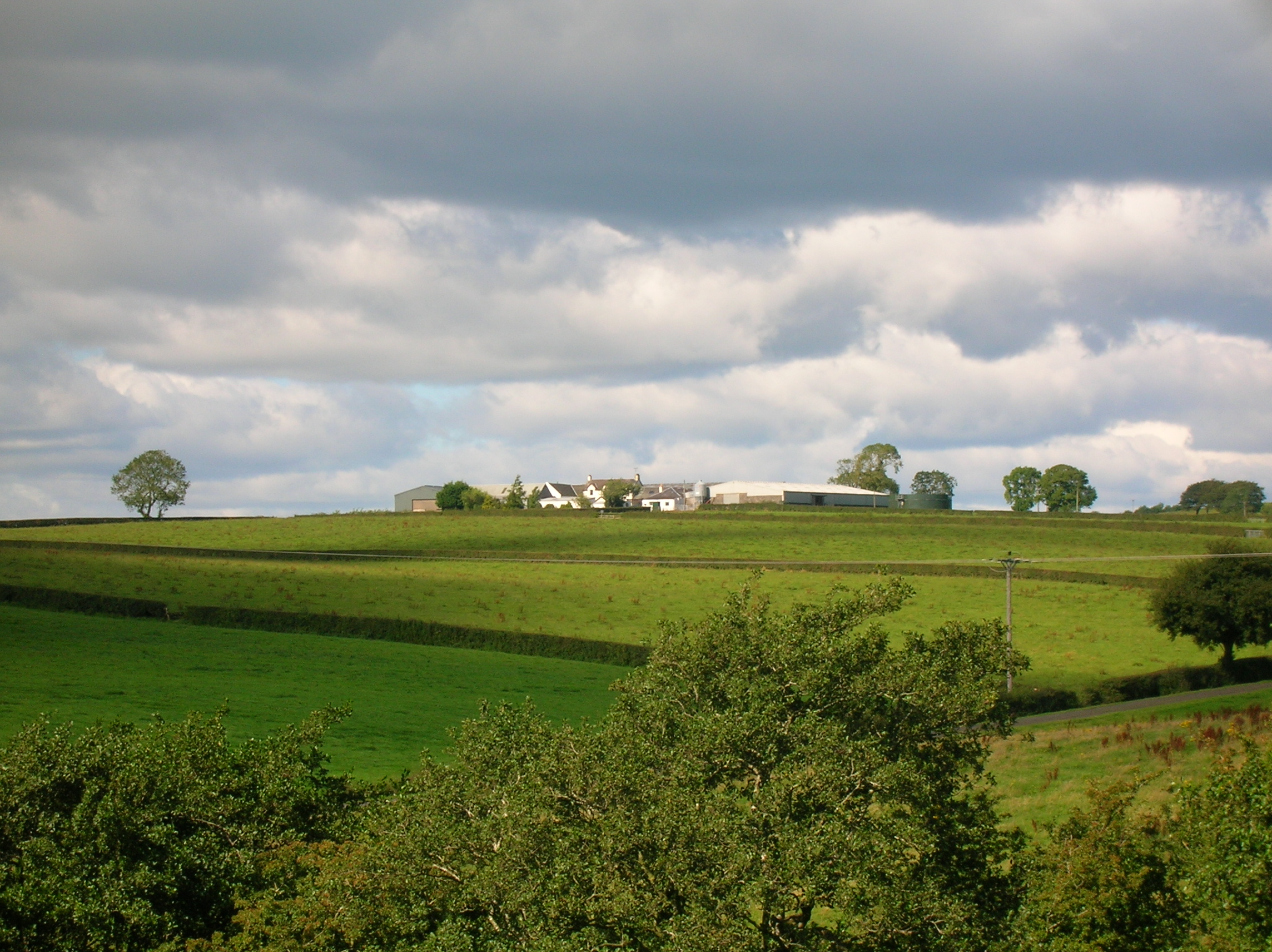
Cauldhame Farm from near the Linn Spout

The fifth laird of Kirk wood was also named John Nevin, and his wife was Katherine Fairnellie, Hew and Christine Nevings being their children. The inventory of his estate in 1618 showed it to be free from debt, the value amounting to £313. Their son Hugh, died before succeeding, leaving a son James as sixth laird of Kirkwood, who is retoured heir male of John Nevin of Kirkwood, his grandfather, 22 January 1635, in the 2½ lands of Kirkwood. James married Margaret Montgomery, but left no children and the property passes to Hugh Nevin, seventh laird of Kirkwood.

Hugh Nevin had been portioner of Auchenmade and inherited the 2½ merklands of Kirkwood called Kirkwode-Nevein. Hugh Nevin, was a baillie burgess of Irvine and Jonet Pawtoun was his wife. Hugh was the brother of Andrew Nevin of Monkredding. Jonet died 28 April 1591, her will mentions one child, a daughter, also Jonet. Whether there was a son Hugh who became portioner of Achinmade or whether it was Andrew's son is not clear. Stephan of Oldhall may have been the common ancestor of the Kirkwood and Monkredding families.

Hugh of Kirkwood died in December 1645, and Hugh, his son, succeeded him. The sum of the inventory was £662-13-8. Hugh of Kirkwood was baillie to Sir Alexander Cunningham as appears in Corshill Baron-Court Book, 7 March 1673, Court holden within the hall of Corshill, the threttene day of January 1673 be the Rycht honourabill Sir Alexander Cunyhame of Corshil, and Hughe Niven of Kirkwood, his honouris balizee, with all other members needful.

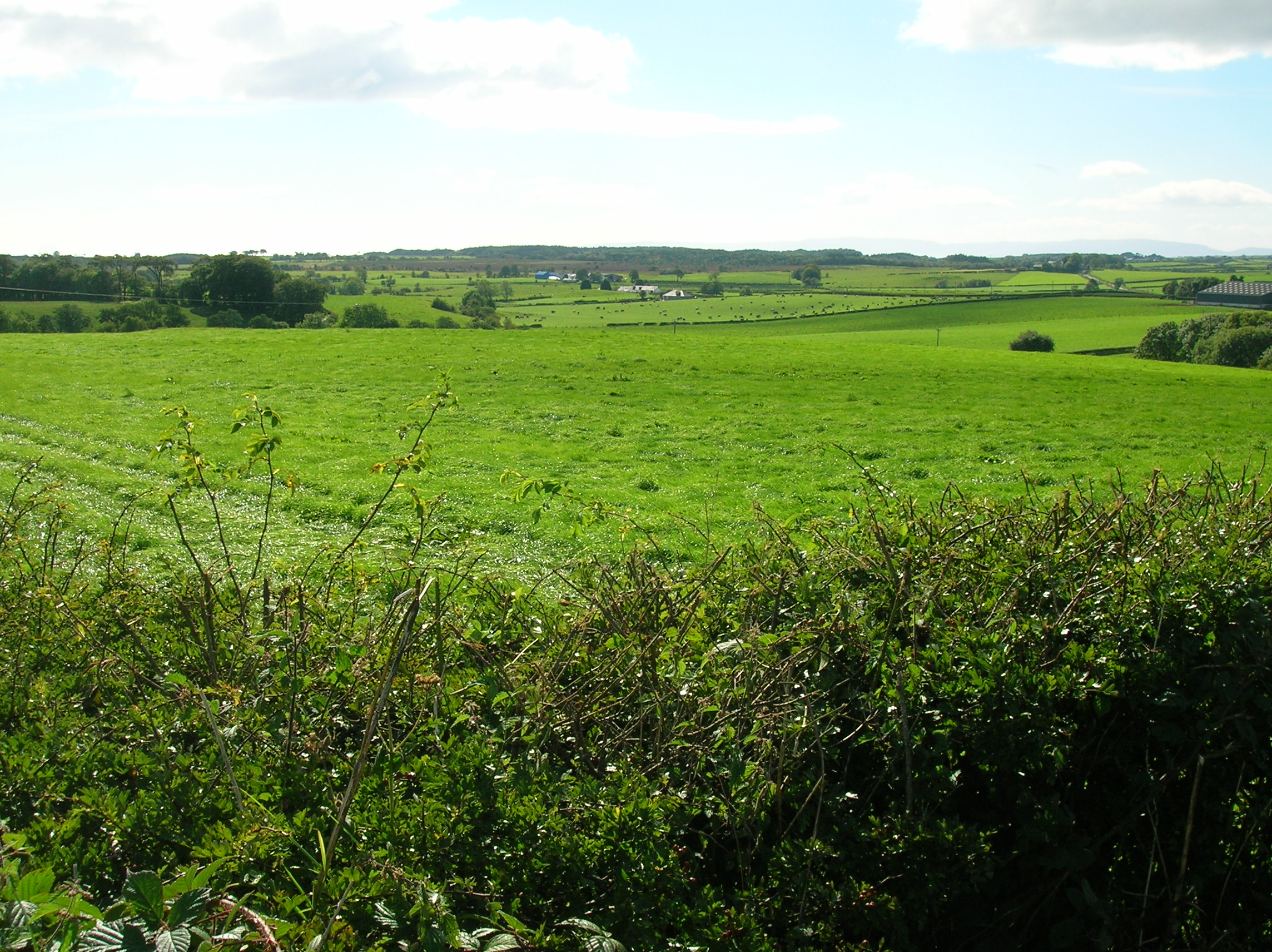
The Chapel-lands Park with Kirkwood or Bloak Moss in the background

On 25 July 1666, a summons was issued of Hew Neving of Kirkwood against John Richie in Byres of Kilwinning, for non-payment of £67 being the silver maill and duty of the lands of Darnboig, which belong to the pursuer. Darnboig, was in 1585, the property of Hugh Nevin, brother of Andrew Nevin of Monkredding.

Hugh appears to have been the last of Nevin laird of Kirkwood; on 2 May 1667, the lands were incorporated into the Eglinton estates. A charter reads:Charter, granting to Hugh, Earl of Eglinton, Lord Montgomery and Kilwinning his heirs &c the 2½ merk lands of the same called Kirkwood Neivine with building etc, the 2½ merk lands of Craiglie with the commomty of Large &c . . . all of which lands (except Kirkwood Neivine and Craglis) formerly belonged to Hugh, Earl of Eglinton, Kirkwood Neivine to Hugh Neivine of Kirkwood, and Craiglie to Robert Montgomerie of Heaslehead, and were resigned by them for new infeftments.

Hugh Nevin died in September 1677 and Agnes Dick was his wife. A will, dated at Over Kirkwood, 28 August 1677, states the said umquhile Hew Nevin of Kirkwood, he ordains that his body be buried in the churchyard of Kilwinning in his father's burial place of Kilwinning.

=== Baillie of Corsehill barony court ===
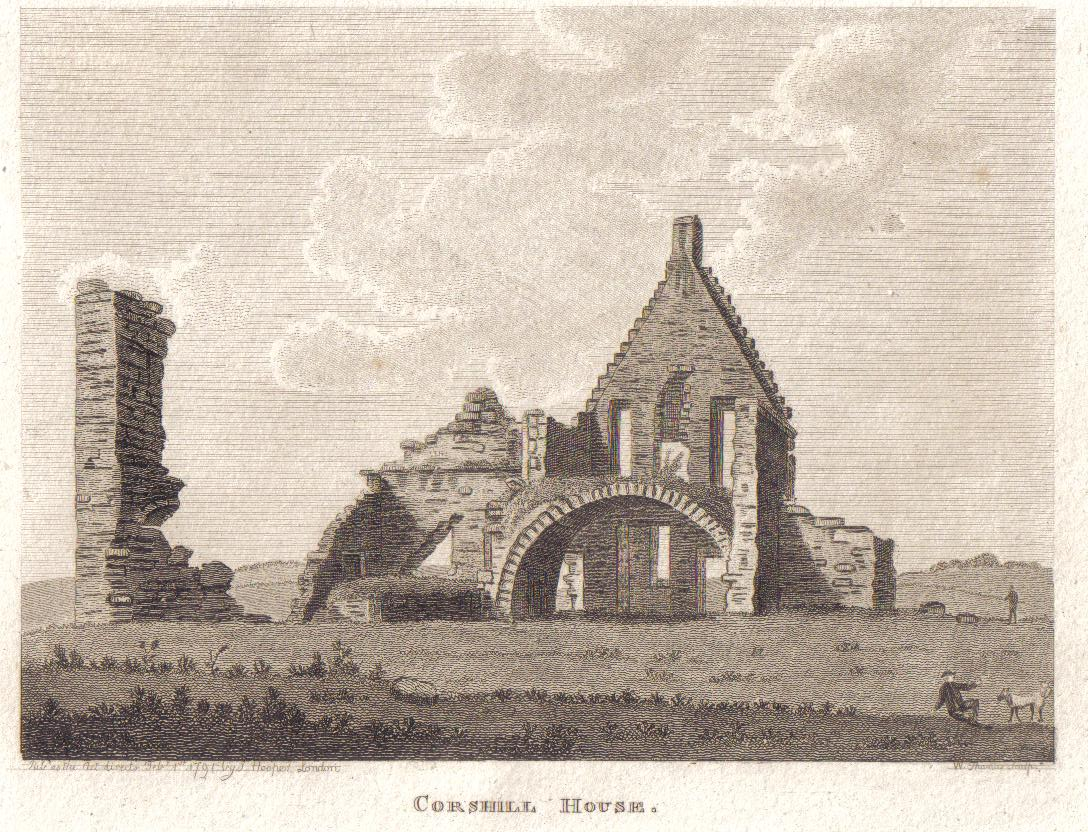
A 1791 View of Corsehill House, where the Barony Court met. Nothing remains today.

The Baron-Baillie was the principal administrative officer of a barony court, his insignia of office was a Cap of Justice, a Black legal Robe, and a medal of office on a chain. The Corsehill Baron-Court records show that Hughe Niven of Kirkwood was one of the baillies from at least January 1673 as he participates as the honouris balizee of Sir Alexander Cunynghame of Corshil (sic) from that date Another baillie at this time was one John Deanes, a merchant of the Kirkton of Stewarton. The last record of a Hew Nevine of Kirkwood as baillie in 1677 as he died in September of that year.

A David Stewart of Kirkwood is named as the baillie to the Corsehill court from November 1680 for Sir Alexander Cuninghame, however by 1698 he is baillie to David Boyle of Kelburn.

The position of baillie was a powerful one and they had many ways of making money for themselves, such as the bailie's 'darak', as it was called, or a day's labour in the year from every tenant on the estate; confiscations, as they generally seized on all the goods and effects of such as suffered capitally; all fines for killing game, blackfish, or cutting green wood were laid on by themselves, and sometimes went into their own pockets. The level of fines was not closely regulated. Another lucrative right was the so called 'Herial Horse', which was the best horse, cow, ox, or other article which any tenant on the estate possessed at the time of his death. This was taken from the widow and children for the baillie, at the time they had most need of assistance. This amounted to a great deal of extra income for the baillie of a large barony.

=== The Nevins ===
The surname was spelt Niven, Nevin, Nevins, Nivens, Navin, Newin, Nevane, Niffen, Nifen, Nephin, Niving, Neving, Neiven, and Nivine. It is derived from 'little saint' and is recorded in Ayrshire and Galloway from the end of the 13th century.

The small tower house, later a mansion, of Monkredding House near Kilwinning, was held by the Nievans or Nevins from at least the 16th to the late 17th centuries, being passed to the Cunninghams of Clonbeith by William Nevin in 1698. The Nevins of Kirkwood, along with the Nevins of Kilwinning were exiled to Ireland at the end of the 18th Century. These Nevins were, as previously stated, related to the Nevin's of Kirkwood. Thomas Nevin built the present house in 1602; it was extended in 1905.

A James Nevin of Drumbuie was a witness to the will of Hugh Nevin of Kirkwood in 1677.

=== The estate ===
The 1799 plan records a number of properties within the Kirkwood Estate, namely Gunshill, Smiddy Farm, Townend, Drawkiln, Coldhame, Bloak Mill, Bowhouse, Bloak North Crofts, Bloak South Crofts, Bankend, South Bloakhill Head, West Bloakhill Head, East Bloakhill Head, South Bloak Holm, North Bloak Holm, Law, Moss House, Waulkmill, Struthers, Moss Park, Lugton, Brae, Kirkwood Moss, and the Cottar houses in Bloak. The estate came to a land area of 911 acres (3.69 km^{2}), with the Lainshaw Estate totalling 1,628 acres (6.59 km^{2}).

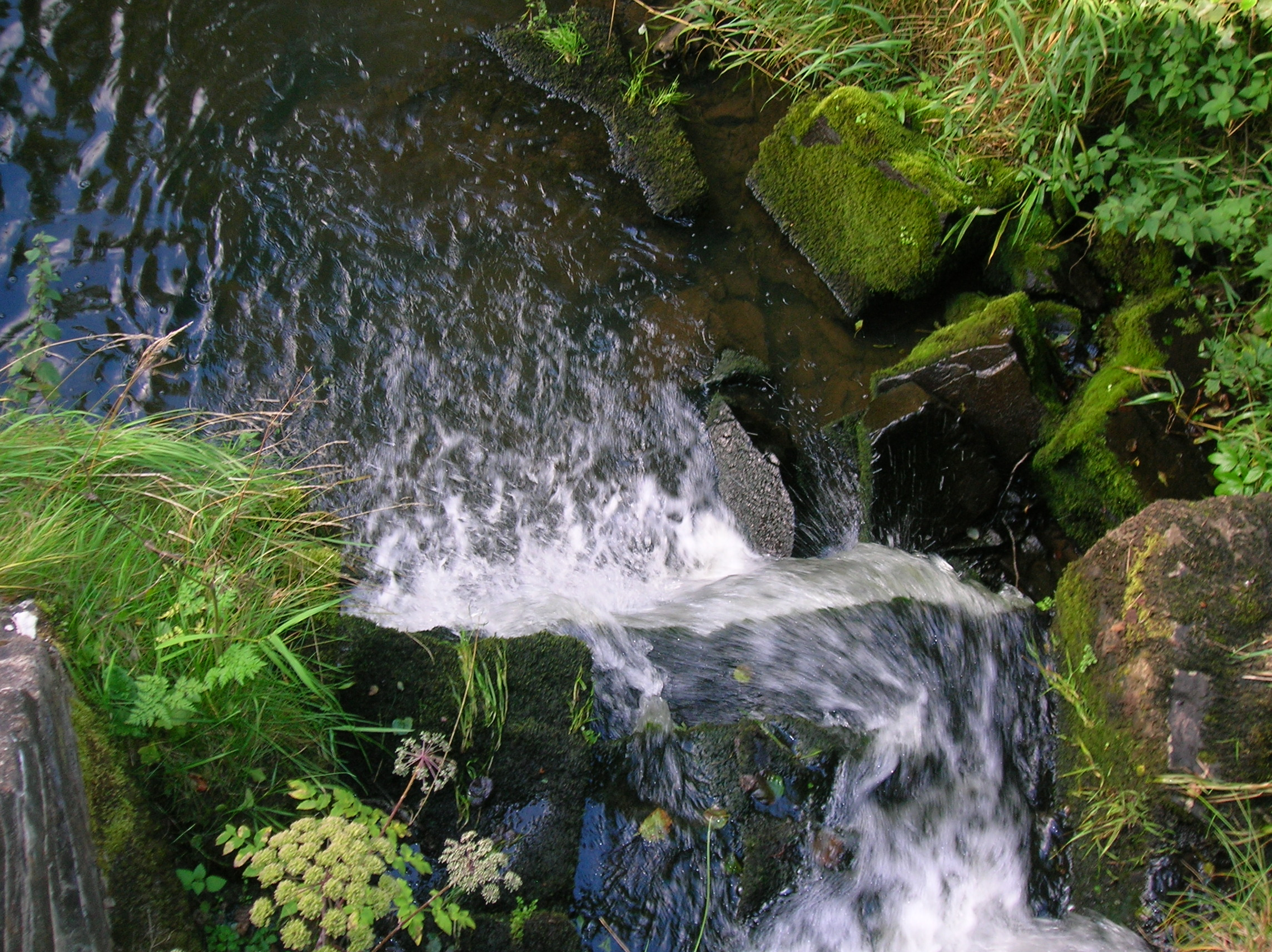
The Linn Spout on the Gunshill Burn from above

Townhead of Kirkwood's entrance previously ran up to the Kirkwood lane. The nearby Bloak Moss behind Law Farm was previously known as Kirkwood Moss. In 1922 Richard John Cunninghame of Lainshaw sold Townhead of Kirkwood to James and Thomas Paterson, Farmers.

In 1779 a mansion still stood at Kirkwood near the middle of a small enclosure, with an apparently raised area in front, delineated by trees. The mansion house stood until the 1790s. The first 6-inch OS map shows a well laid out garden complex in front of Kirkwood, corresponding to the raised area shown on the 1779 map, with paths that led, following field boundaries, to the old toll road near North Kilbride Farm. In 1799 a 'smiddy park' is shown with three buildings to the west of the house. Gunshill nearby is shown as a single building with a small enclosure in front of it. The field or 'Park' names of Kirkwood and Gunshill are of interest, including Whin, Johnshill, Stone, Byrestead, Gooseward, Ward, Wood, Long Crooks, Hillock Holm and the Chapel-lands across the road.

The 1775 map shows a mansion house surrounded by substantial woodland policies, as does Thomson's map of 1820. William Aiton's map of 1808 shows a mansion house at Kirkwood.

A field going by the curious name of 'Kilwinning Butts' was located on the Lands of Kirkwood on the road leading to Dunlop Church in the 19th century.

Whinstone, limestone and sandstone quarries were present in the area, with a limekiln near Kirkwood itself. The Spout Lynn is a waterfall on the Gunshill Burn near Kirkwood.

Gouknest Park lies nearby and coal pits are shown in the area in 1799, as well as at North Kilbride, where a Coalpit Park is recorded. Gouknest produced gas coal and was abandoned in November 1903.

==== Religious connections ====
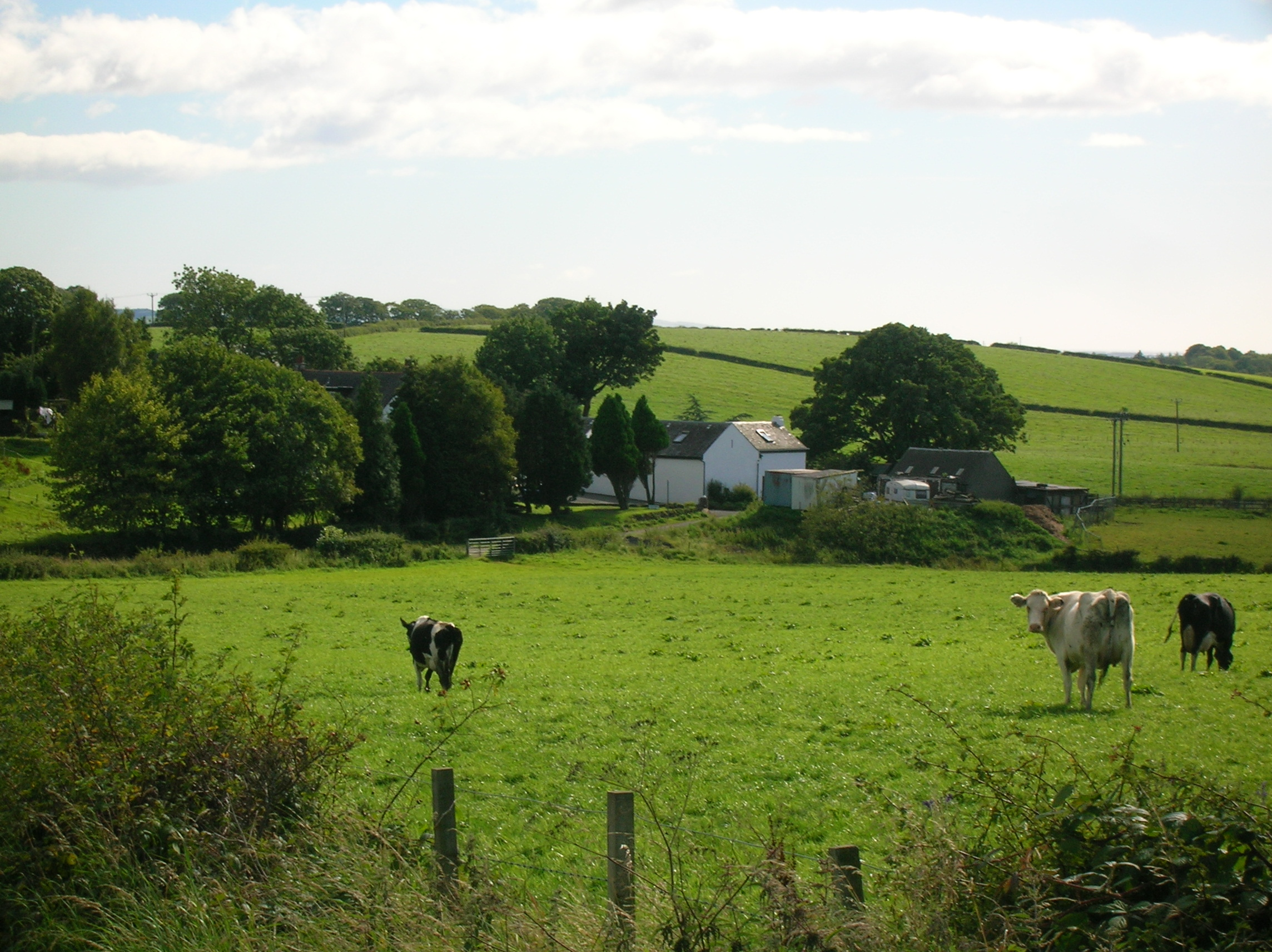
North Kilbride Farm

The plethora of apparently religious names in this area – Kirkwood, Chapel-lands Park, Kirkmuirs, Kirkhill, Lady Moss, High Cross, Canaan and the Kilbride farms, suggest that in the past pre-Christian and/or Christian site or sites were located here. No documentary evidence remains and the earliest record is for Kirkry in 1654, now Kilbride. Bride, Brigit or St. Brigid was originally a Celtic Goddess linked with the festival of Imbolc, held on the eve of the first of February. Brigid was the goddess of Spring and was associated with healing and sacred wells. The name Canaan at Kirkmuir was in use as early as 1779.

== The Tam o'Shanter connection ==
Towards the end of the 17th century several Niven brothers from Monkridding and Brigend areas of Kilwinning parish moved to the Girvan area. John Niven set up as a blacksmith and was well known for designing a building a cart, with wheels that rotated on a fixed axle, at a time when most farmers still used sleds.

"Ae market-day thou was nae sober;
That ilka melder, wi' the miller,
Thou sat as lang as thou had siller;.
That every naig was ca'd a shoe on,
The smith and thee gat roaring fou on; "

It is thought that John is the smith mentioned in Robert Burns's poem 'Tam o'Shanter' and his son Robert may have been the miller in the classic poem.

== Micro-history ==
A Mill of Kilbride and the mill lands of Kilbride are recorded in the register of sasines.

Stories of ghosts at North Kilbride include an old man often seen in a rocking chair and horses cantering by onto the abandoned road to Irvinehill Farm.

== See also ==
- Monkredding House, North Ayrshire
- Lainshaw Estate
- Chapeltoun
- Barony of Aiket
