= Bloak =

Coordinates: 55.688046°N 4.57485°W

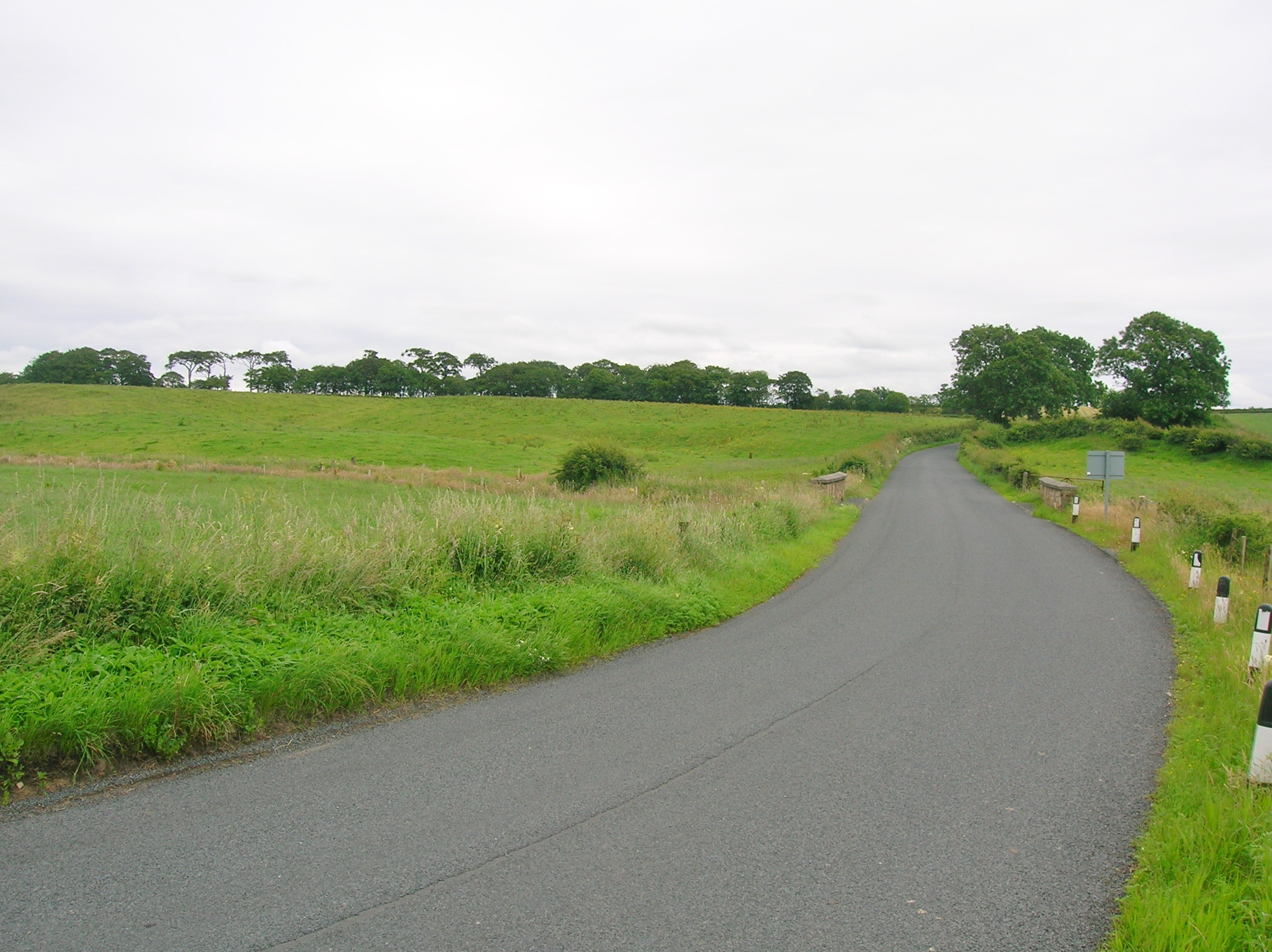
- Site of the old Bloak hamlet

- Location within East Ayrshire
- OS grid reference: NS 38234 46848
- Council area: East Ayrshire
- Lieutenancy area: Ayrshire and Arran
- Country: Scotland
- Sovereign state: United Kingdom
- Police: Scotland
- Fire: Scottish
- Ambulance: Scottish

Bloak was a hamlet or clachan in East Ayrshire, Parish of Stewarton, Scotland. The habitation was situated between Auchentiber and Stewarton on the B778. It was originally built as a row of housing for crofters and farm workers. The small school remained open for some years after the hamlet ceased to exist. Robinson gives the Scots word "blout" as meaning "an eruption of fluid", or a place that is soft or wet.

== History ==
The 1779 estate map of the Lainshaw Estate shows the hamlet of Bloak with the fields of South Crofts and North Crofts lying below Bowhouse Farm. Eight buildings are shown on either side of the road and located as far as the junction of the road to Kennox. Bloak was once part of the "Lands of Kirkwood" that formed a small estate in the Parish of Stewarton, East Ayrshire lying between Stewarton and Dunlop, which in 1678 became part of the lands of Lainshaw, known as the Lainshaw, Kirkwood and Bridgehouse Estate. Kirkwood was anciently known as Bloak Cunninghame.

Bloak seems to have been a typical "Farm Town", the origins of which lie in the common medieval sub-division of land called a "ploughgate" (104 acres or 42 hectares), this being the extent of land which one plough team of oxen could till in a year. This area was again subdivided into four plots known as 'husbandlands', each of 26 acres (11 hectares). A husbandland could sustain and provide two oxen, and eight oxen were needed for a plough-team. This arrangement led to small farm towns like Bloak being established with accommodation for at least four men and their families, living in six to eight houses. A similar hamlet or clachan still survives at Hessilhead, which also had a small school until around 1900.

=== Bloak School ===
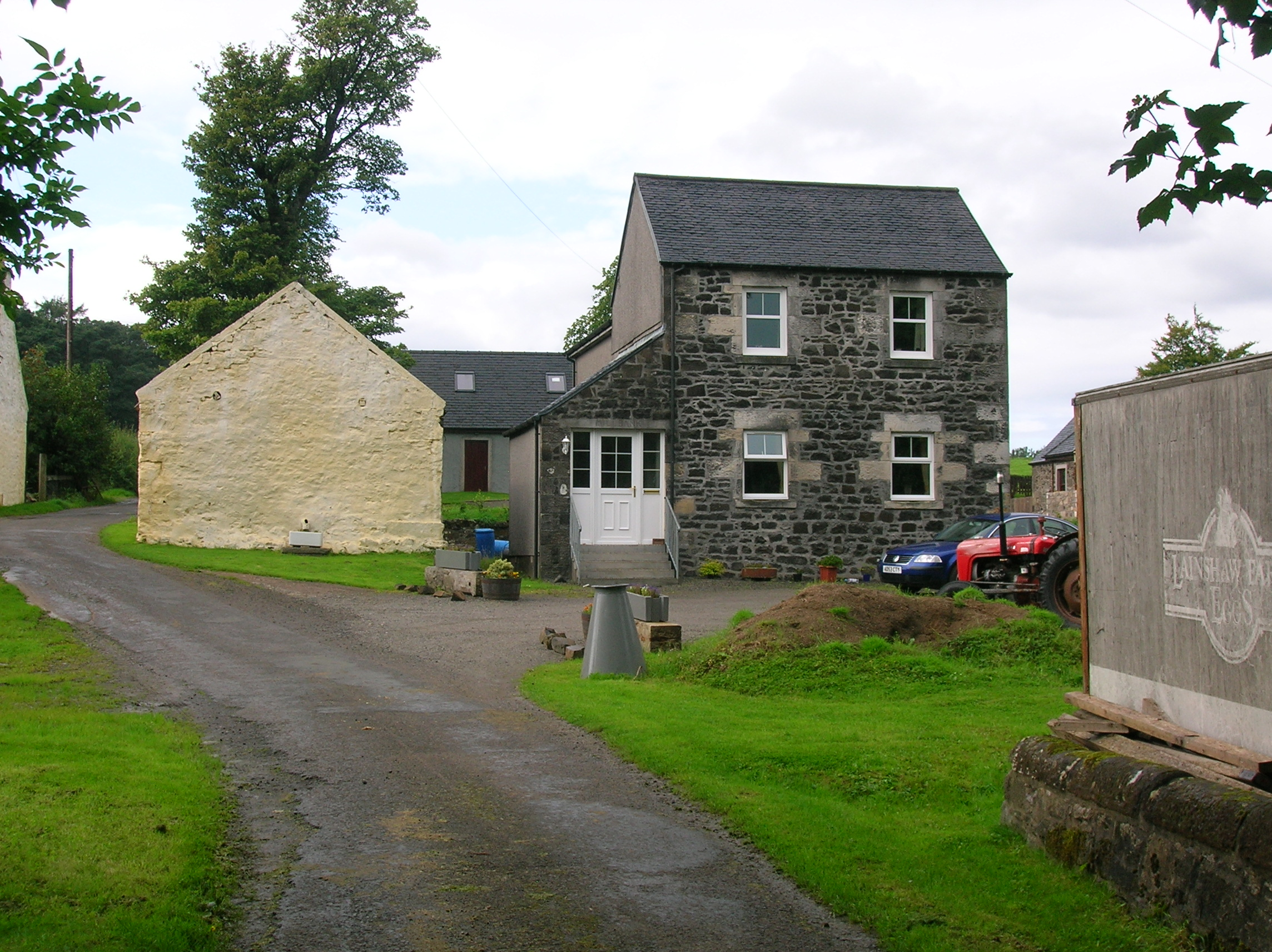
Bloak School would have looked similar to the nearby old Hessilhead School.

The school had been built by the Cunninghams of Lainshaw and the schoolmaster's only salary was the fees paid by the parents. Recorded in 1894 as "the old and now deserted schoolhouse, for long the home of Jenny Gillies", Jenny lived there according to the 1851 census and was a mason's widow aged 74, dying in 1859 at the age of 81. By 1895 the only remaining building in the hamlet is that of the school. The other buildings are not recorded as ruins and appear to have been demolished by that time. The school building is shown until 1958.

=== Bloak Castle ===
West Bloakhillhead was a dairy farm. Circa 1825 the ruins of Bloak Castle that stood to the south of the farm were completely removed by the farm's tenant, Mr. Nairn.

=== Cartographic evidence ===
Blaeu's edition of Timothy Pont's map of circa 1604 shows a Blook and Blook Mill. In 1747 the settlement of Blook is indicated on Roy's map. On Armstrong's map of 1775 shows a Bloate near Kirkwood. Johnson's map of 1828 marks Bloak as a group of four buildings at Bowhouse Farm road end. Thomson's map of 1832 shows Bloak. A hamlet of around eight dwellings and a school are shown in 1858 with further dwellings at Bloakholmes. A path is shown running from the hamlet, shown as Bloak and Bloakcrofts, to the Linn Spout and Kirkwood Farm. By 1895 the only remaining building is that of the school. Oddly the other buildings are not recorded as ruins and appear to have been demolished. The school building is shown until 1958, but no longer marked as such, by which time a building had been constructed at the Bowhouse road end, surviving to this day (2012).

== Views at Bloak ==
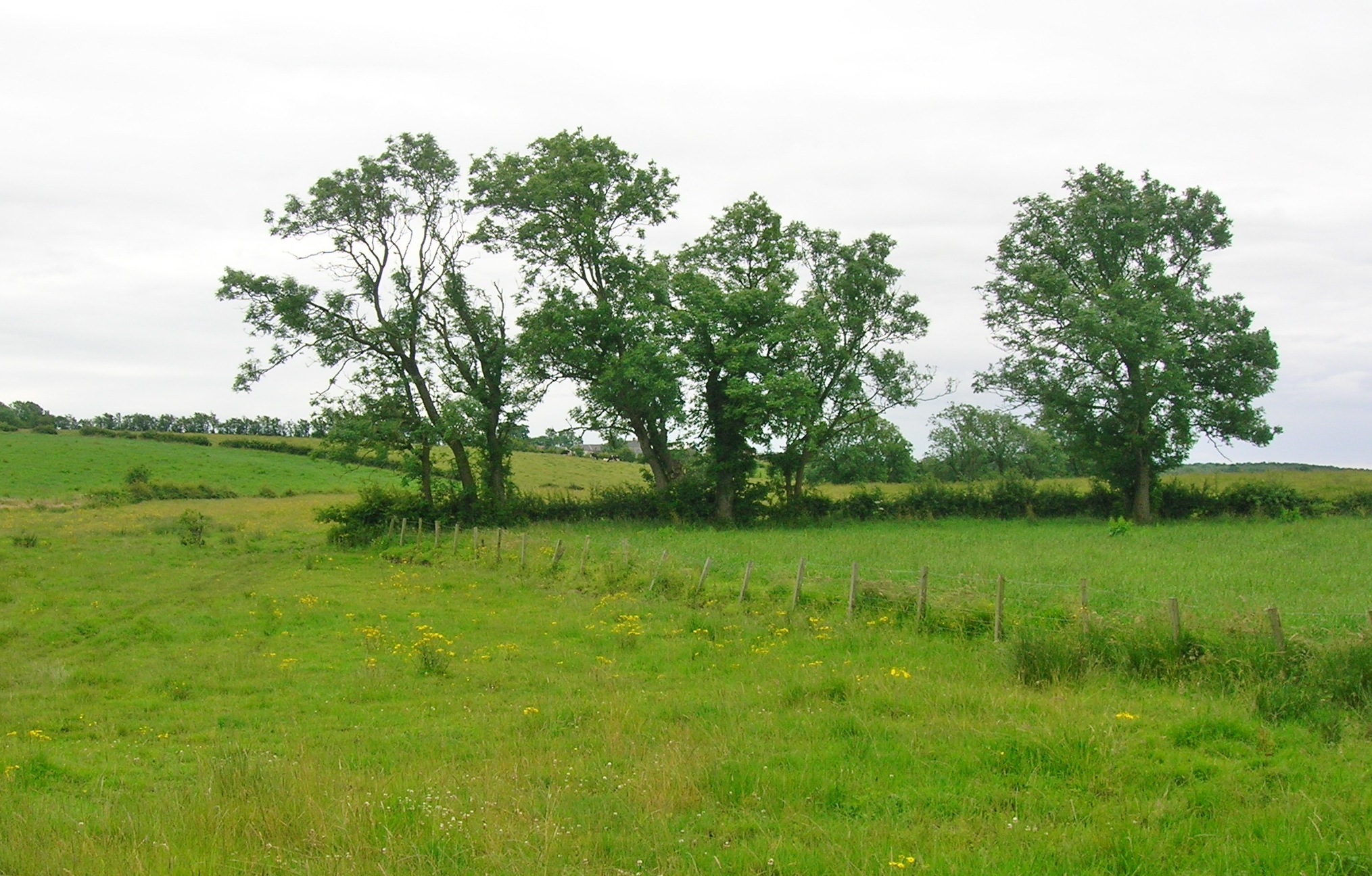
Section of old hedge boundary.

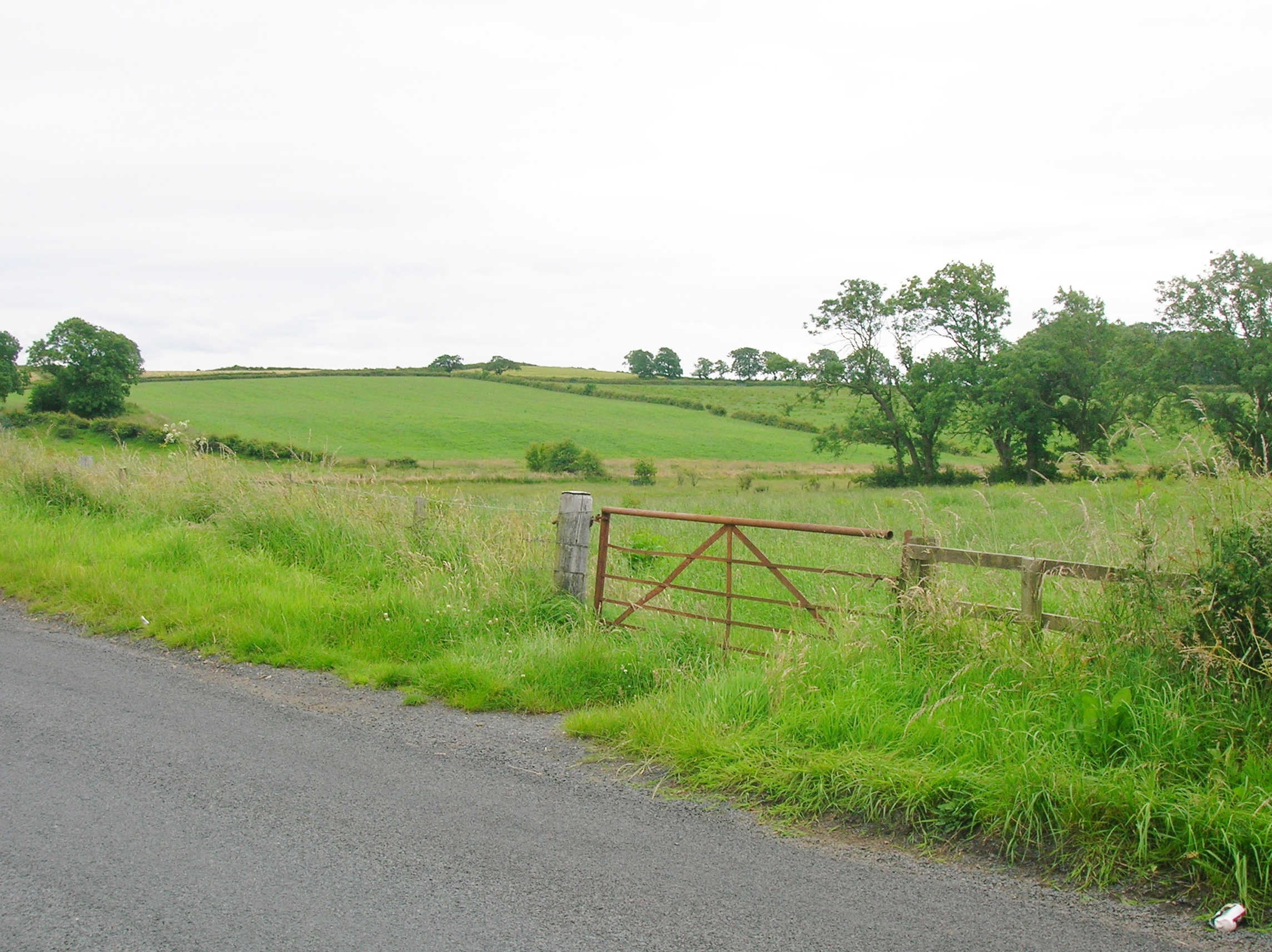
Site of the old school.

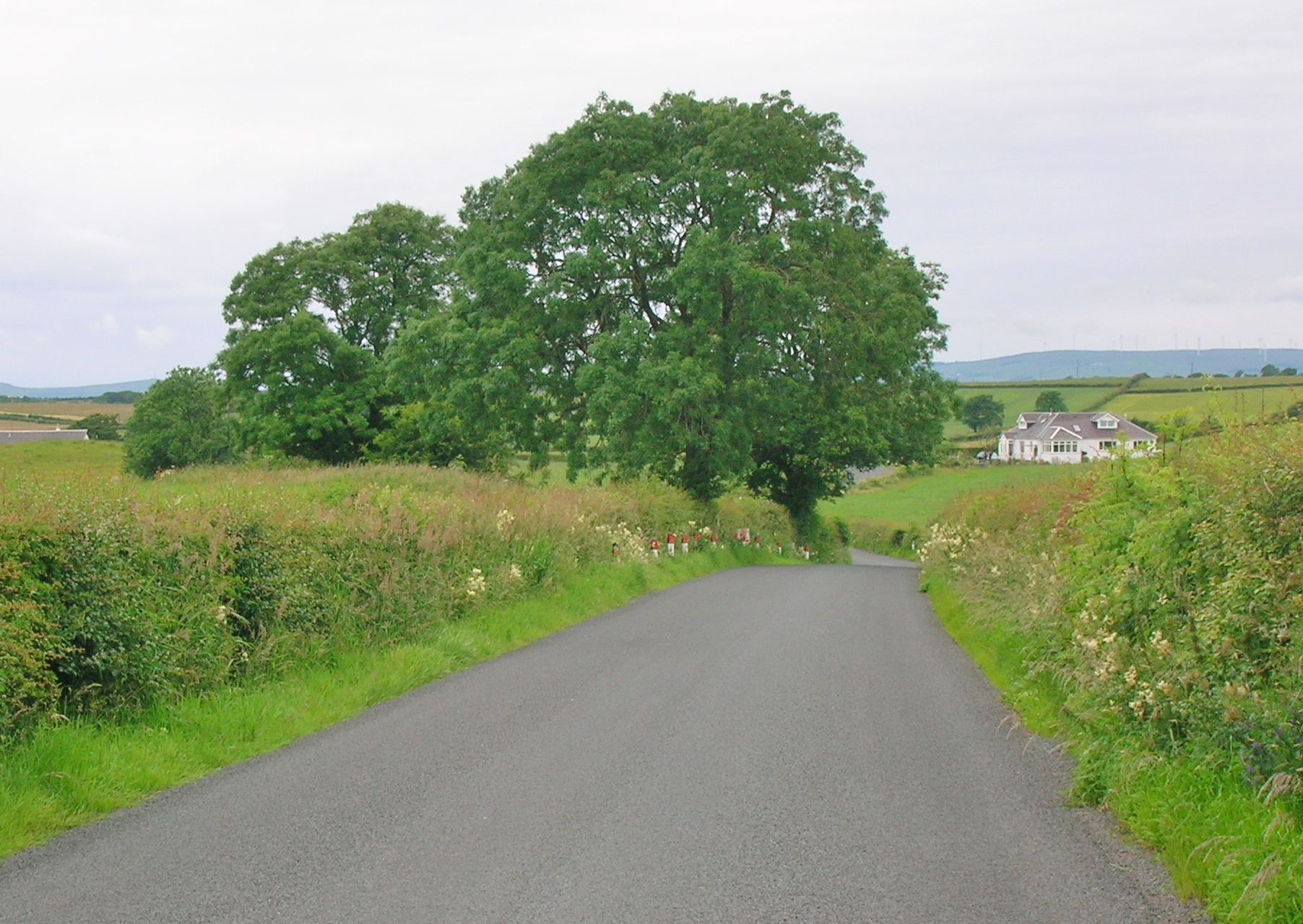
Site of an old lime kiln.

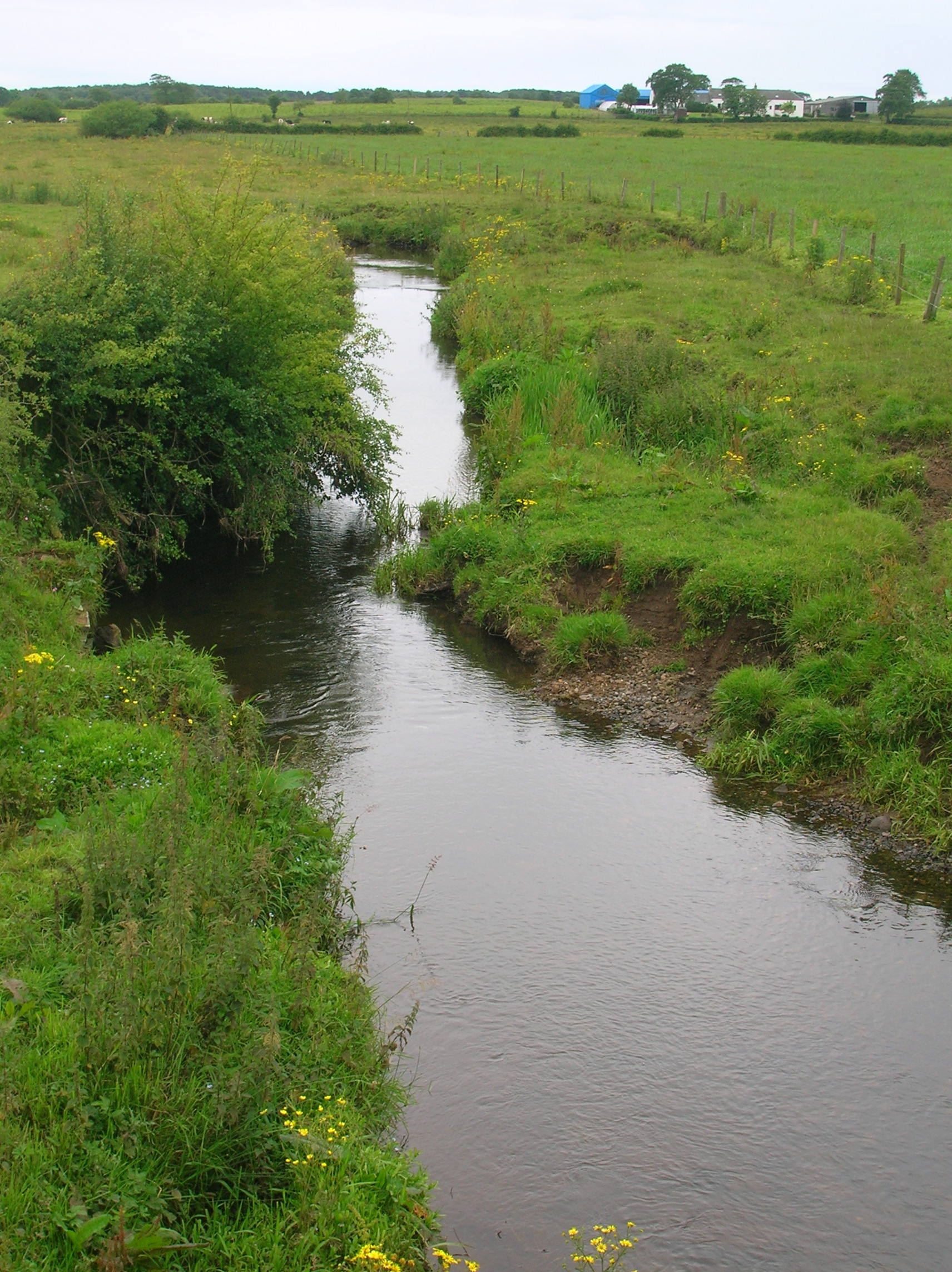
The Lugton Water at Bloak Bridge.

== Bloak Well ==
Paterson (1866) states that there is a mineral spring near Stewarton, called the Bloak Well. gives the Scot's word 'blout' as meaning the 'eruption of fluid' or a place that is soft or wet. Both meanings would fit in this context. Blout and Bloak are very similar words, with Bloak Moss close by as well as the South and East Bloakhillhead farms.

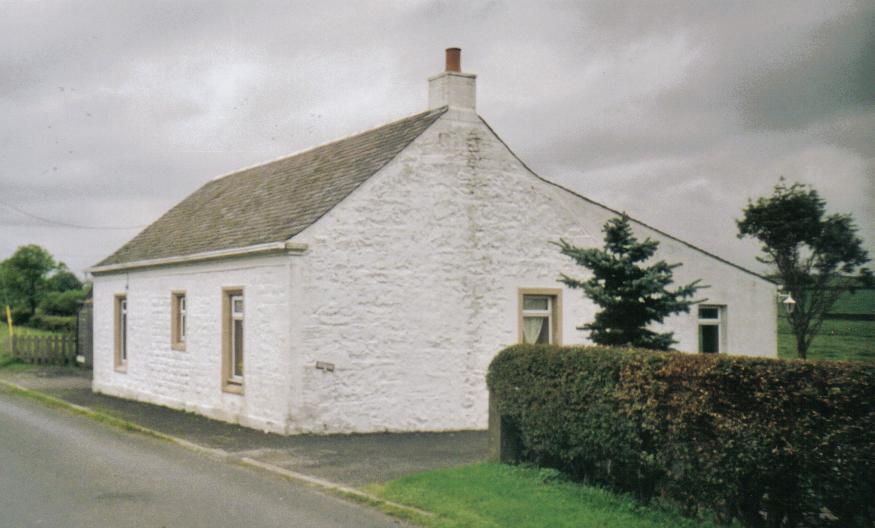
A view of Bloak Well, now called 'Salt Well'.

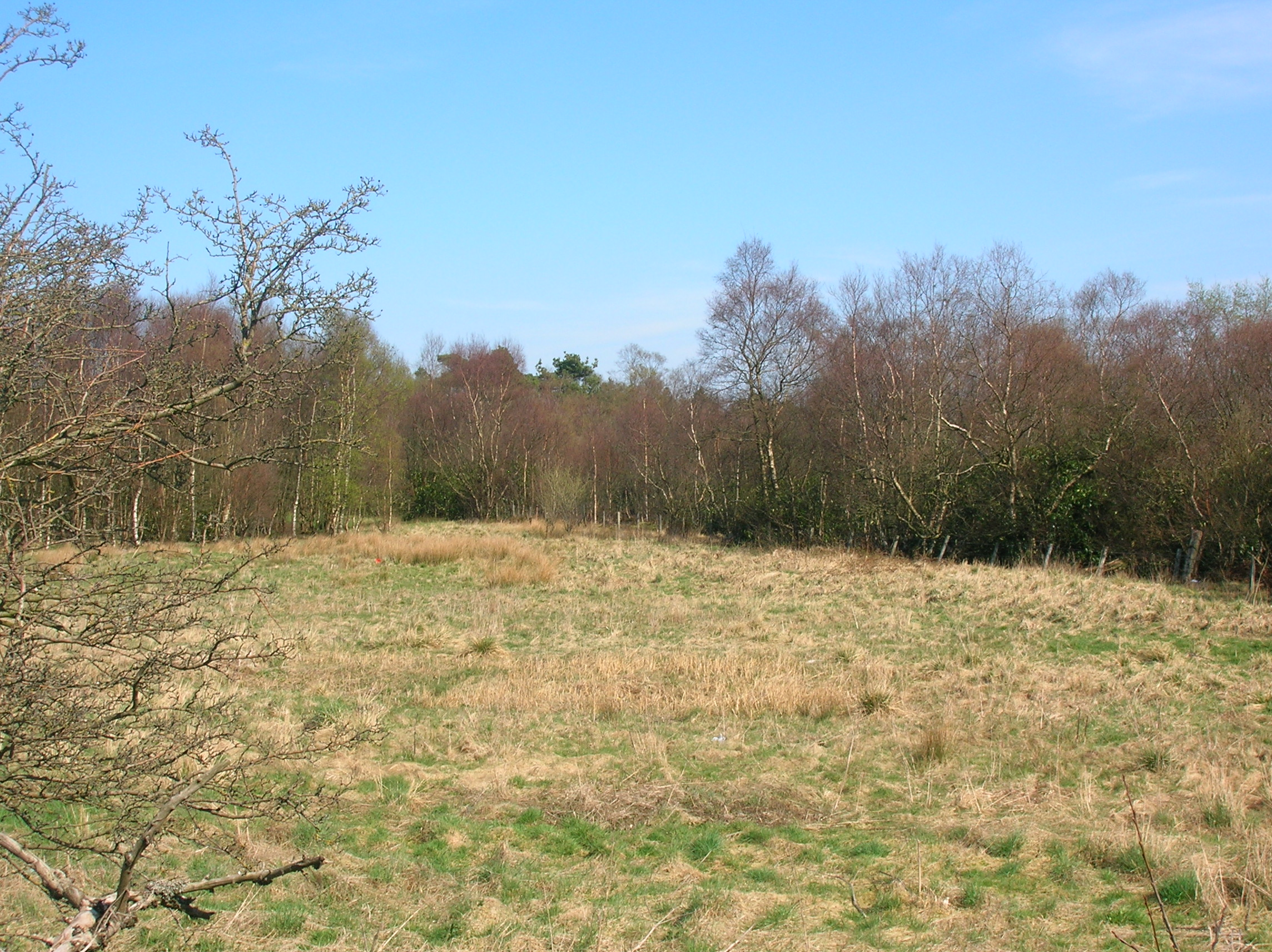
Bloak or Kirkwood Moss.

A well recorded as Bloak Well was first discovered in 1800, around 1826 (Paterson 1866) or 1810 or 1800, by the fact that pigeons from Lainshaw House and the neighbouring parishes were found to flock here to drink. Mr. Cunningham of Lainshaw built a handsome house over the well in 1833 and appointed a keeper to take care of it as the mineral water was of some value owing to healing properties attributed to it. The well was located in the middle of the kitchen. In 1846 the hamlet of Bloak is recorded as having a mineral well. The cottage, along with Lugton Farm and the associated land was purchased, from the Lainshaw Estate, and added to Wardlaw Farm around 1920 by John Miller who farmed Wardlaw at the time. He refurbished and extended in the cottage in the 1930s as a retirement home but failed to persuade his wife to move there. The cottage was let rent free for a number of years as John hoped, in vain, that it would eventually become the retirement home. Saltwells as it was then known returned to family use in 1947 when John's newly married youngest son and his wife moved in. Over the next 40 years the name of the cottage, changed to Saltwell then back to Saltwells following conflicting advice from researchers of local history.

== The Bloak Mills ==
Based on Timothy Pont's earlier map the 1654 Blaeu map shows a Mill of Bloak on the Lugton Water at the location of the later Waulkmill.

The 1856 OS map shows Bloak Mill (NS378473) as a small corn mill powered by a long lade running down from a dam on the Glazert Water and by this date the building between the mill building and the miller's cottage is no longer shown, a probable garden area being indicated. South Brae cottages lie opposite on the north-west side of the Glazert and the mill was approached via the Bloak Mill Ford and footbridge with a slightly raised causeway running up to the mill. A spill way close to a sluice was used to divert water away from the waterwheel when necessary. The old cart shed at the miller's house had lost its roof circa 1905. Originally part of the Kirkwood Estate Bloak Mill later became part of the Lainshaw Estate.

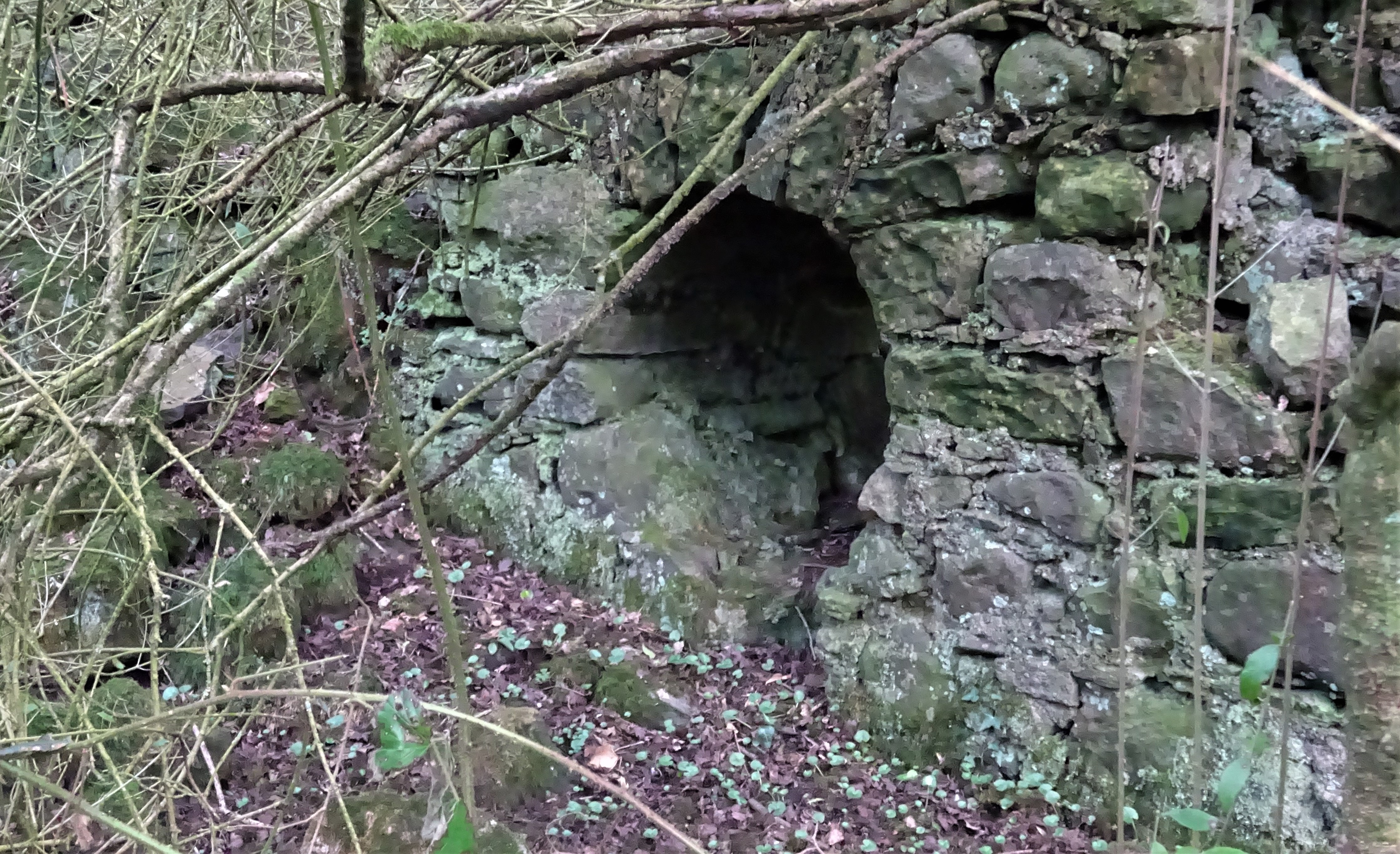
The Access for the axle of the waterwheel.

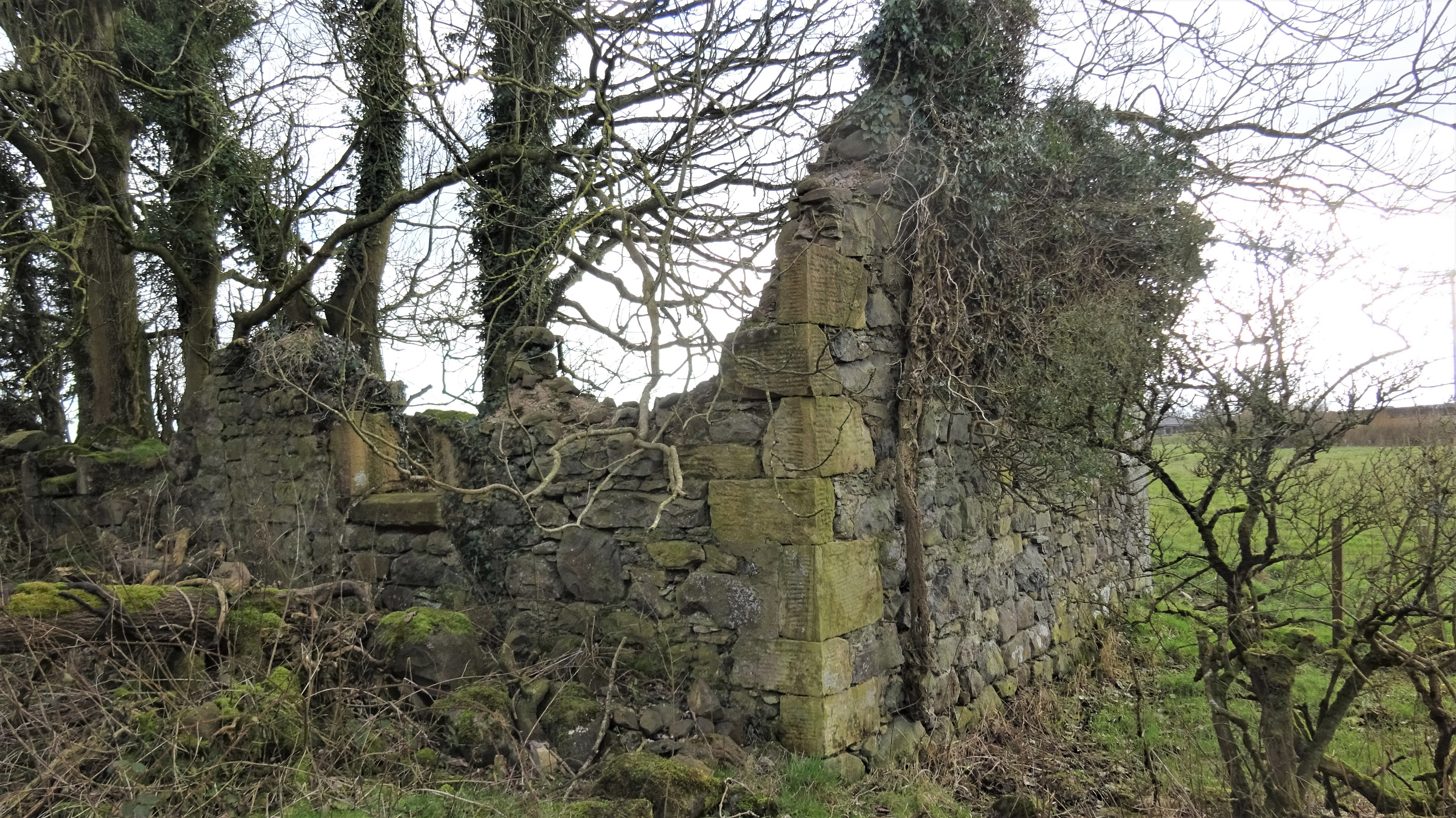
The ruins of the miller's cottage.

The Kilmarnock Standard reported a fatal accident at Bloak mill in January 1860 when "Mr Robert Steel, corn miller, lost his life. It seems that deceased had been oiling the machinery of the mill, and had got caught by some portion of it; the pressure of his body, however, caused the machinery to go out of gearing, by which he was enabled to extricate himself, after which he succeeded in reaching the mill door, where his cries soon attracted the inmates of the house; but when they reached him, he was only able to say ‘I’m gone,’ and in a few minutes thereafter he expired."

By 1925 the mill is recorded as 'disused' on the OS map and although originally a corn mill, it is reported in 1874 that the Stewarton Manure Company works at Bloak Mill were for sale and the mill appears to have been milling bones for use as fertilizer.

The ruins have been robbed of stone over the years however substantial remains of the cart shed, miller's cottage and the mill building remain. The spill way can still be seen and the lade followed down from the site of the dam on the Glazert Water. The access hole for the axle of the waterwheel and the waterwheel pit can be identified (Datum 2021).

== Micro-history ==
A small elongated field known as Baiken Butts is shown at Bowhouse Farm, suggesting a connection with archery as butts refers to ground used for practising archery. The name of the farm may also be related to this. A field going by the curious name of 'Kilwinning Butts' was located on the road leading to Dunlop Church in the 19th century.

John Gillies Shields was born 12 November 1834 in Bloak, Stewarton, Ayrshire, and died 22 September 1908 in the nearby Galloway Ford farm. In 1845 he married Jane Guthrie, the daughter of Charles Guthrie. He married Elizabeth Howie in 1888.

Margaret Young was the wife of John Gavan, a farmer who lived at Bloak. She died and was buried at Stewarton on 15 September 1827.

William Nairn was the son of Robert Nairn and Agnes Millar. William was born 1785 in Bloak and married Janet Kerr on 8 November 1811 and secondly Elizabeth Jamieson.

Knitted bonnets were made at Bloak.

== See also ==
- Kirkwood Estate, East Ayrshire
- Chapeltoun
