= Eilenberg–Niven theorem =

Algebraic theorem

The Eilenberg–Niven theorem is a theorem that generalizes the fundamental theorem of algebra to quaternionic polynomials; that is, polynomials with quaternion coefficients and variables. It is due to Samuel Eilenberg and Ivan M. Niven.

== Statement ==
Let

$$P(x) = a_0 x a_1 x \cdots x a_n + \varphi(x),$$

where x, a_{0}, a_{1}, ... , a_{n} are non-zero quaternions and φ(x) is a finite sum of monomials similar to the first term but with degree less than n. Then P(x) = 0 has at least one solution.

== Generalizations ==
If permitting multiple monomials with the highest degree, then the theorem does not hold: for a counterexample, P(x) = x + ixi + 1 = 0 has no solutions.

The Eilenberg–Niven theorem can also be generalized to octonions: all octonionic polynomials with a unique monomial of highest degree have at least one solution, independent of the order of the parentheses (the octonions are a non-associative algebra). Different from quaternions, however, the monic and non-monic octonionic polynomials do not have always the same set of zeros.
