= William Davidson Niven =

Scottish mathematician and electrical engineer

Sir William Davidson Niven KCB FRS
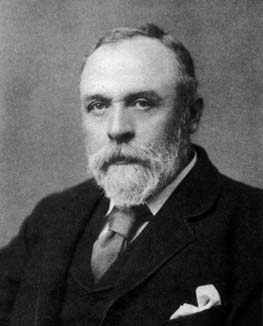
- Born: William Davidson Niven; March 24, 1842; Peterhead, Scotland
- Died: May 29, 1917 (aged 75); Sidcup; England
- Resting place: Peterhead Old Churchyard; 57.504068°N 1.790279°W
- Education: University of Aberdeen; Trinity College, Cambridge
- Known for: Editor of James Clerk Maxwell's papers
- Awards: The William Hopkins Prize (1894)
- Scientific career
- Fields: Mathematics
- Workplaces: Royal Naval College, Greenwich

Sir William Davidson Niven KCB FRS (24 March 1842 – 29 May 1917) was a Scottish mathematician and electrical engineer.

After an early teaching career at Cambridge, Niven was Director of Studies at the Royal Naval College, Greenwich, for thirty years.

== Life ==
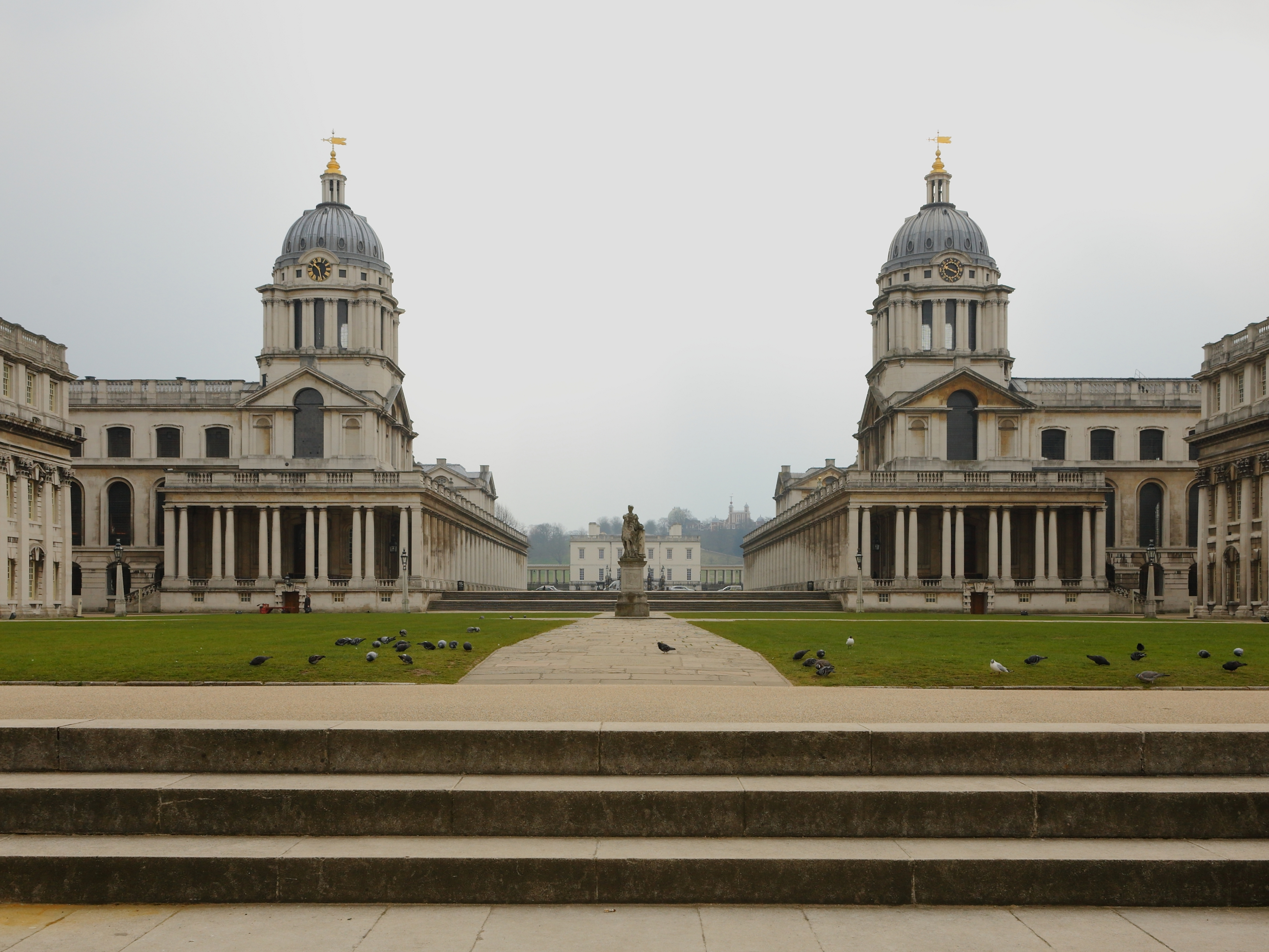
Royal Naval College, Greenwich

Niven was born at Peterhead in Aberdeenshire, one of five notable mathematician brothers: Charles and James the best known. He graduated first from the University of Aberdeen, then from Trinity College, Cambridge, where he was 3rd wrangler in 1866. He was elected a Fellow of his college.

In 1882 Niven became Director of Studies at the Royal Naval College, Greenwich, succeeding Thomas Archer Hirst. He was appointed a Companion of the Order of the Bath (Civil division) in Queen Victoria's Diamond Jubilee Honours of 1897. He retired in 1903, when he was knighted by being appointed a Knight Commander of the Order of the Bath.

Niven was a colleague of James Clerk Maxwell (1831–1879), whose scientific papers he edited after his death. Among Niven's students was Alfred North Whitehead, to whom he taught mathematics, by instructing him in the physics of Maxwell.

In retirement Niven lived at Eastburn, Sidcup, Kent, where he died in 1917.

== Major publications ==
Niven edited works by J. C. Maxwell:

- 1881: A Treatise on Electricity and Magnetism, 2nd edition
- 1890: The Scientific Papers of James Clerk Maxwell from Biodiversity Heritage Library
