= Niven's constant =

Mathematical constant

In number theory, Niven's constant, named after Ivan Niven, is the largest exponent appearing in the prime factorization of a natural number "on average". More precisely, if we set $H(1) = 1$ and define $H(n)$ to be the largest exponent appearing in the prime factorization of $n > 1$, then Niven's constant is given by

$$\lim_{n \to \infty} \frac{1}{n} \sum_{j=1}^n H(j) = 1+\sum_{k=2}^\infty \bigg(1-\frac{1}{\zeta(k)}\bigg)
= 1.7052111401\dots$$

where $\zeta$ is the Riemann zeta function. Niven also proved that

$$\sum_{j=1}^n h(j) = n + c\sqrt{n} + o(\sqrt{n}),$$

where $h(1) = 1$, $h(n)$ is defined to be the smallest exponent appearing in the prime factorization of $n > 1$, $o$ is little-o notation, and $c = \zeta(\textstyle\frac{3}{2})/\zeta(3)$. Consequently,

$$\lim_{n\to\infty} \frac{1}{n}\sum_{j=1}^n h(j) = 1.$$
