= Charles Niven =

Scottish mathematician and physicist

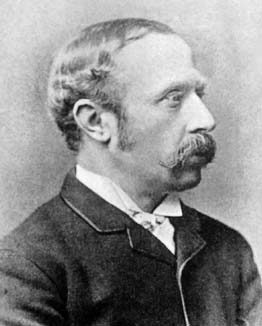
- Born: 14 September 1845; Peterhead, Scotland
- Died: 11 May 1923 (aged 77); Aberdeen, Scotland
- Resting place: St Devenicks-on-the-Hill, Banchory-Devenick (Aberdeenshire); 57.113051°N 2.196437°W
- Education: University of Cambridge
- Spouse: Mary Stewart
- Parent(s): Charles Niven and Barbara Davidson
- Scientific career
- Fields: Mathematics
- Workplaces: Marischal College, University of Aberdeen

Charles Niven (1845–1923) was a Scottish mathematician and physicist who spent most of his career at the University of Aberdeen. He published on mechanics, electricity, and heat.

== Life and work ==
Charles Niven studied mathematics at Aberdeen and was awarded a BA in 1863, and then studied at Cambridge. Charles and his older brother William D. were tutored by Edward Routh for the Mathematical Tripos. Charles became senior wrangler in 1867.

In 1867, Niven was appointed Professor of Mathematics at Queen's College Cork, in Ireland a position that George Boole had previously occupied.

From 1880, Niven was professor of Natural Philosophy in the University of Aberdeen, and he was responsible for establishing the Physics Department in Marischal College in 1906. He retired at the end of 1922.

Charles Niven was a Fellow of the Royal Society from 1880 and honorary member of the Edinburgh Mathematical Society from 1883.

== Bibliography ==
- Flood, Raymond (2006). "Mathematics in Victorian Ireland". Journal of the British Society for the History of Mathematics. 21 (3): 200–211. doi:10.1080/17498430600964433. ISSN 1749-8430. S2CID 122564180.
- Macdonald, H.M. (1923). "Charles Niven, 1845–1923 Obituary". Proceedings of the Royal Society of London. 104 (728): xxvii–xviii. doi:10.1098/rspa.1923.0126. ISSN 1364-5021.
- Warwick, Andrew (2003). "A very hard nut to crack". In Mario Biagioli; Peter Galison (eds.). Scientific Authorship: Credit and Intellectual Property in Science. Taylor & Francis. pp. 133–163. ISBN 978-0-415-94293-5.
