= Ivan M. Niven =

Canadian-American number theorist (1915–1999)

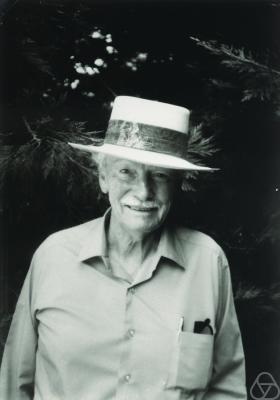
- Born: October 25, 1915; Vancouver, British Columbia, Canada
- Died: May 9, 1999 (aged 83); Eugene, Oregon, U.S.
- Known for: Niven number; Niven's constant; Niven's proof; Niven's theorem; Eilenberg–Niven theorem
- Awards: Lester R. Ford Award (1970)

Academic background
- Education: University of British Columbia (BA); University of Chicago (PhD)
- Doctoral advisor: Leonard Eugene Dickson

Academic work
- Discipline: Mathematics
- Sub-discipline: Number theory
- Institutions: University of Oregon
- Doctoral students: Margaret Maxfield

Ivan Morton Niven (October 25, 1915 – May 9, 1999) was a Canadian-American mathematician best remembered for his work on Waring's problem in number theory. He worked for many years as a professor at the University of Oregon, and was president of the Mathematical Association of America (MAA). He wrote several books on mathematics.

== Life ==
Niven was born in Vancouver. He did his undergraduate studies at the University of British Columbia and was awarded his doctorate in 1938 from the University of Chicago. He was a member of the University of Oregon faculty from 1947 to his retirement in 1981. He was president of the Mathematical Association of America (MAA) from 1983 to 1984.

He died in 1999 in Eugene, Oregon.

== Research ==
Niven completed the solution of most of Waring's problem in 1944. This problem, based on a 1770 conjecture by Edward Waring, consists of finding the smallest number $g(n)$ such that every positive integer is the sum of at most $g(n)$ $n$-th powers of positive integers. David Hilbert had proved the existence of such a $g(n)$ in 1909; Niven's work established the value of $g(n)$ for all but finitely many values of $n$.

Niven gave an elementary proof that $\pi$ (pi) is irrational in 1947.

Niven numbers, Niven's constant, and Niven's theorem are named for Niven.

He has an Erdős number of 1 because he coauthored a paper with Paul Erdős, on partial sums of the harmonic series.

== Recognition ==
Niven received the University of Oregon's Charles E. Johnson Award in 1981. He received the MAA Distinguished Service Award in 1989.

He won a Lester R. Ford Award in 1970. In 2000, the asteroid 12513 Niven, discovered in 1998, was named after him.

== Books ==
- Irrational Numbers. [Carus Mathematical Monographs]. The Mathematical Association of America. 1956. ISBN 0-88385-011-7.
- Niven, Ivan; Zuckerman, Herbert S.; Montgomery, Hugh L. (1991) [First published 1960]. An Introduction to the Theory of Numbers. New York: John Wiley & Sons. ISBN 978-81-265-1811-1.
- Calculus: An Introductory Approach. Van Nostrand Reinhold Company. 1966. ISBN 978-0-442-06032-9.
- Numbers: Rational and Irrational. Anneli Lax New Mathematical Library. Vol. 1. Washington DC: The Mathematical Association of America. 2011 [First published 1961]. doi:10.5948/upo9780883859193. ISBN 978-0-88385-919-3.
- Diophantine Approximations. Mineola, N.Y: Dover Publications. 1 January 2008 [First published 1963]. ISBN 978-0-486-46267-7.
- Mathematics of Choice: How to Count without Counting. Washington, DC: Mathematical Association of America. 1965. ISBN 978-0-88385-615-4.
- Maxima and Minima Without Calculus. Washington, D.C.: Cambridge University Press. 1981. ISBN 978-0-88385-306-1.

== See also ==
- Proof that π is irrational
