= Niven Abu Rahmoun =

Israeli Arab politician

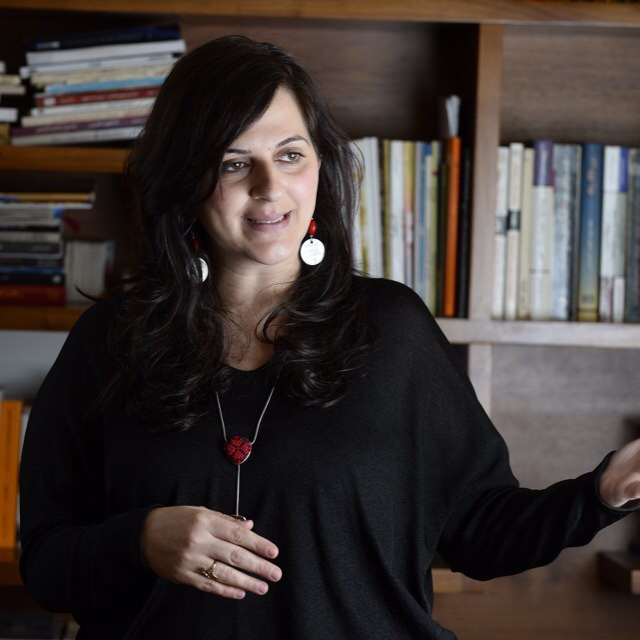
- Abu Rahmoun in 2018

Faction represented in the Knesset
- 2018–2019: Joint List

Personal details
- Born: 24 November 1981 (age 43); Reineh, Israel

Niven Abu Rahmoun (Arabic: نيفين ابو رحمون, Hebrew: ניבין אבו רחמון; born 24 November 1981) is an Israeli Arab politician who served as a member of the Knesset for the Joint List between 2018 and 2019.

== Biography ==
Abu Rahmoun was born in Reineh, a town in northern Israel to Arab Christian parents. She earned a bachelor's degree in political science and communications, before studying for a master's degree in political science at Bar-Ilan University. She subsequently worked as teacher at the high school in Bu'eine Nujeidat between 2008 and 2018, teaching civics.

A member of Balad since 1998, Abu Rahmoun was placed 19th on the Joint List (an alliance of the four main Arab parties) prior to the 2015 Knesset elections. Although the party won only 13 seats, Abu Rahmoun entered the Knesset on 8 August 2018 as a replacement for Wael Younis as part of a rotation agreement within the alliance. She did not contest the April 2019 elections, and lost her seat.

Married with two children, Abu Rahmoun lives in Bu'eine Nujeidat.
