= Niven's theorem =

Theorem on rational values of the sine

In mathematics, Niven's theorem, named after Ivan Niven, states that the only rational values of θ in the interval 0° ≤ θ ≤ 90° for which the sine of θ degrees is also a rational number are:

$$\begin{align}
\sin 0^\circ & = 0, \\[10pt]
\sin 30^\circ & = \frac 12, \\[10pt]
\sin 90^\circ & = 1.
\end{align}$$

In radians, one would require that 0 ≤ x ≤ π/2, that x/π be rational, and that sin(x) be rational. The conclusion is then that the only such values are sin(0) = 0, sin(π/6) = 1/2, and sin(π/2) = 1.

The theorem appears as Corollary 3.12 in Niven's book on irrational numbers.

The theorem extends to the other trigonometric functions as well. For rational values of θ, the only rational values of the sine or cosine (i.e., the only rational trigonometric numbers) are 0, ±1/2, and ±1; the only rational values of the secant or cosecant are ±1 and ±2; and the only rational values of the tangent or cotangent are 0 and ±1.

== History ==
Niven's proof of his theorem appears in his book Irrational Numbers. Earlier, the theorem had been proven by D. H. Lehmer and J. M. H. Olmstead. In his 1933 paper, Lehmer proved the theorem for the cosine by proving a more general result. Namely, Lehmer showed that for relatively prime integers k and n with n > 2, the number 2 cos(2πk/n) is an algebraic number of degree φ(n)/2, where φ denotes Euler's totient function. Because rational numbers have degree 1, we must have n ≤ 2 or φ(n) = 2 and therefore the only possibilities are n = 1,2,3,4,6. Next, he proved a corresponding result for the sine using the trigonometric identity sin(θ) = cos(θ − π/2). In 1956, Niven extended Lehmer's result to the other trigonometric functions. Other mathematicians have given new proofs in subsequent years.

== See also ==
- Pythagorean triples form right triangles where the trigonometric functions will always take rational values, though the acute angles are not rational.
