= Robert Niven (English cricketer) =

English cricketer (born 1948)

Personal information
- Born: 28 April 1948 (age 78); Felixstowe, Suffolk, England
- Source: Cricinfo, 19 May 2016

Robert Andrew Niven (born 28 April 1948) is an English former cricketer. He played 25 first-class matches for Oxford University Cricket Club between 1968 and 1973.

== See also ==
- List of Oxford University Cricket Club players
