= Opinion polling for the 2015 Israeli legislative election =

Israeli polls do not take the electoral threshold (currently 3.25%) into account in a uniform fashion. Some polls report the number of seats each party would win purely according to the percentages, as though there were no threshold; others eliminate parties that poll below the threshold and distribute the 120 available Knesset seats only among those who pass it. As a result, parties that poll at or near the threshold can show inconsistent results, bouncing between 0 and the minimum 3 or 4 seats.

Polls may not add up to 120 seats due to rounding or omitted parties that drop out or do not poll consistently.

| Date | Poll | Likud | Yisrael Beiteinu | Yesh Atid | Labor | Hatnuah | Jewish Home | Shas | UTJ | Meretz | Hadash (Note: Hadash-UAL-Ta'al-Balad are running together as the Joint List.) | UAL- Ta'al | Balad | Otzma (Note: Otzma and Yachad are running together on a joint list.) | Yachad | Kulanu |
|---|---|---|---|---|---|---|---|---|---|---|---|---|---|---|---|---|
| 2013 election results | | 31 | | 19 | 15 | 6 | 12 | 11 | 7 | 6 | 4 | 4 | 3 | 0 | —N/a | —N/a |
| Seats in the outgoing Knesset | | 18 | 13 | 19 | 15 | 6 | 12 | 11 | 7 | 6 | 4 | 4 | 3 | 0 | 0 | 0 |
| Final results | | 30 | 6 | 11 | 24 | | 8 | 7 | 6 | 5 | 13 | | | 0 | | 10 |
2015
| 17 Mar | Channel 1 exit poll | 27 | 5 | 11 | 26 | | 8 | 7 | 6 | 5 | 12 | | | 0 | | 9 |
| 17 Mar | Channel 2 exit poll | 28 | 5 | 11 | 27 | | 8 | 7 | 6 | 5 | 13 | | | 0 | | 10 |
| 17 Mar | Channel 10 exit poll | 27 | 5 | 11 | 27 | | 8 | 7 | 7 | 5 | 13 | | | 0 | | 10 |
| 13 Mar | Deadline for publishing election polls; under Israeli law, publishing election polls in the last five days before an election is prohibited. | | | | | | | | | | | | | | | |
| 13 Mar | Channel 2 | 22 | 5 | 12 | 26 | | 11 | 7 | 6 | 5 | 13 | | | 5 | | 8 |
| 13 Mar | Channel 10 | 20 | 5 | 12 | 24 | | 12 | 7 | 7 | 5 | 13 | | | 5 | | 10 |
| 13 Mar | Reshet Bet | 21 | 6 | 11 | 25 | | 11 | 9 | 6 | 5 | 13 | | | 4 | | 9 |
| 13 Mar | Panels/Jerusalem Post | 21 | 4 | 13 | 25 | | 11 | 7 | 6 | 5 | 13 | | | 5 | | 10 |
| 13 Mar | Teleseker/Walla | 23 | 6 | 12 | 25 | | 11 | 7 | 7 | 4 | 12 | | | 4 | | 9 |
| 13 Mar | Midgam/Yedioth Ahronoth | 22 | 5 | 12 | 26 | | 12 | 7 | 6 | 5 | 13 | | | 4 | | 8 |
| 13 Mar | Teleseker/Channel 1 | 22 | 6 | 12 | 25 | | 11 | 8 | 7 | 4 | 12 | | | 4 | | 9 |
| 12 Mar | Panels/Maariv | 21 | 5 | 13 | 24 | | 12 | 7 | 7 | 5 | 13 | | | 4 | | 9 |
| 12 Mar | Smith/Globes | 20 | 6 | 12 | 24 | | 12 | 9 | 6 | 5 | 13 | | | 4 | | 9 |
| 12 Mar | Maagar Mochot/Kol Bramah Radio | 21 | 5 | 13 | 24 | | 13 | 7 | 7 | 5 | 12 | | | 5 | | 8 |
| 12 Mar | Dialog/Haaretz | 21 | 4 | 12 | 24 | | 11 | 7 | 6 | 6 | 13 | | | 5 | | 11 |
| 11 Mar | Midgam/Israel Army Radio (Galatz) | 21 | 6 | 12 | 24 | | 13 | 7 | 7 | 6 | 12 | | | 4 | | 8 |
| 10 Mar | Panels/Knesset Channel | 21 | 5 | 14 | 24 | | 12 | 7 | 6 | 5 | 13 | | | 4 | | 9 |
| 10 Mar | Channel 2 | 21 | 6 | 12 | 25 | | 13 | 7 | 6 | 5 | 13 | | | 4 | | 8 |
| 8 Mar | Geocartography | 26 | 7 | 12 | 21 | | 13 | 8 | 8 | 5 | 12 | | | 0 | | 8 |
| 6 Mar | Yisrael Hayom | 23 | 6 | 13 | 23 | | 12 | 6 | 6 | 5 | 13 | | | 5 | | 9 |
| 6 Mar | Teleseker/Walla! | 24 | 6 | 12 | 24 | | 11 | 8 | 7 | 4 | 12 | | | 4 | | 8 |
| 6 Mar | Panels/Maariv | 22 | 5 | 13 | 24 | | 12 | 7 | 6 | 6 | 13 | | | 4 | | 8 |
| 5 Mar | Channel 1 | 24 | 6 | 13 | 24 | | 11 | 8 | 7 | 4 | 12 | | | 4 | | 7 |
| 4 Mar | Dialog/Channel 10 | 23 | 5 | 13 | 23 | | 11 | 7 | 6 | 5 | 13 | | | 4 | | 10 |
| 4 Mar | Midgam/Channel 2 | 23 | 6 | 12 | 24 | | 12 | 6 | 6 | 6 | 13 | | | 4 | | 8 |
| 3 Mar | PM Netanyahu delivers a speech about Iran to a joint meeting of U.S. Congress | | | | | | | | | | | | | | | |
| 3 Mar | Panels/Knesset Channel | 21 | 5 | 13 | 24 | | 12 | 7 | 7 | 6 | 13 | | | 4 | | 8 |
| 3 Mar | Israel Army Radio (Galatz) | 22 | 7 | 12 | 24 | | 12 | 6 | 7 | 6 | 12 | | | 4 | | 8 |
| 2 Mar | Maagar Mochot/Kol Bramah Radio | 23 | 6 | 11 | 24 | | 12 | 7 | 7 | 5 | 12 | | | 5 | | 8 |
| 1 Mar | Geocartography | 24 | 5 | 11 | 22 | | 14 | 4 | 8 | 6 | 12 | | | 5 | | 9 |
| 27 Feb | Israel Radio | 22 | 6 | 12 | 23 | | 12 | 8 | 6 | 5 | 13 | | | 4 | | 9 |
| 27 Feb | Maariv | 23 | 5 | 12 | 25 | | 11 | 7 | 7 | 5 | 13 | | | 4 | | 8 |
| 27 Feb | Teleseker/Walla! | 23 | 6 | 13 | 23 | | 13 | 7 | 7 | 4 | 12 | | | 5 | | 7 |
| 26 Feb | Television debate of the leaders of all parties except Likud, Zionist Union, and UTJ | | | | | | | | | | | | | | | |
| 26 Feb | Panels/Maariv-Jerusalem Post | 23 | 5 | 12 | 24 | | 12 | 7 | 7 | 5 | 13 | | | 4 | | 8 |
| 26 Feb | Channel 1 | 24 | 6 | 12 | 24 | | 12 | 7 | 7 | 4 | 12 | | | 5 | | 7 |
| 26 Feb | Channel 10 | 21 | 6 | 13 | 23 | | 12 | 7 | 7 | 5 | 12 | | | 5 | | 9 |
| 24 Feb | Midgam /Channel 2 | 22 | 6 | 12 | 24 | | 12 | 7 | 7 | 6 | 12 | | | 5 | | 7 |
| 24 Feb | Dialog/Haaretz | 23 | 6 | 12 | 23 | | 12 | 7 | 7 | 5 | 12 | | | 4 | | 9 |
| 24 Feb | Panels/Knesset Channel | 24 | 5 | 12 | 24 | | 11 | 7 | 7 | 5 | 13 | | | 4 | | 8 |
| 22 Feb | Teleseker/Nana 10 | 23 | 4 | 11 | 25 | | 14 | 5 | 7 | 6 | 12 | | | 5 | | 8 |
| 22 Feb | Geocartography | 27 | 7 | 11 | 23 | | 11 | 4 | 7 | 4 | 12 | | | 5 | | 9 |
| 20 Feb | Smith/Israel Radio | 24 | 5 | 10 | 24 | | 13 | 8 | 7 | 5 | 12 | | | 4 | | 8 |
| 20 Feb | Teleseker/Walla | 24 | 6 | 12 | 23 | | 13 | 7 | 7 | 4 | 12 | | | 4 | | 8 |
| 19 Feb | Panels/Maariv | 22 | 5 | 12 | 24 | | 13 | 7 | 7 | 6 | 12 | | | 4 | | 8 |
| 19 Feb | Teleseker/Channel 1 | 24 | 6 | 11 | 24 | | 13 | 7 | 7 | 4 | 12 | | | 4 | | 8 |
| 18 Feb | Channel 10 | 22 | 5 | 12 | 23 | | 13 | 7 | 7 | 5 | 12 | | | 4 | | 10 |
| 17 Feb | TRI/Bizportal | 23 | 4 | 12 | 24 | | 14 | 4 | 8 | 4 | 12 | | | 5 | | 10 |
| 17 Feb | Panels/Knesset Channel | 23 | 6 | 12 | 24 | | 12 | 7 | 7 | 6 | 12 | | | 4 | | 7 |
| 15 Feb | Midgam/Channel 2 | 24 | 7 | 11 | 25 | | 11 | 6 | 7 | 5 | 12 | | | 5 | | 7 |
| 15 Feb | Geocartography | 27 | 6 | 8 | 24 | | 11 | 7 | 8 | 6 | 12 | | | 4 | | 7 |
| 13 Feb | Smith/Israel Radio | 25 | 5 | 9 | 24 | | 13 | 8 | 7 | 5 | 13 | | | 4 | | 7 |
| 13 Feb | Teleseker/Walla | 25 | 7 | 9 | 23 | | 13 | 7 | 7 | 5 | 12 | | | 4 | | 8 |
| 13 Feb | Panels/Maariv | 24 | 6 | 12 | 23 | | 11 | 6 | 7 | 6 | 13 | | | 5 | | 7 |
| 12 Feb | Smith/Globes | 24 | 6 | 9 | 24 | | 13 | 8 | 7 | 5 | 12 | | | 4 | | 8 |
| 11 Feb | Teleseker/Channel 1 | 27 | 7 | 10 | 23 | | 11 | 6 | 8 | 5 | 12 | | | 4 | | 7 |
| 10 Feb | Panels/Knesset Channel | 23 | 5 | 12 | 23 | | 12 | 7 | 7 | 5 | 12 | | | 5 | | 9 |
| 9 Feb | 202 Strategies/Times of Israel | 23 | 7 | 11 | 27 | | 11 | 5 | 7 | 4 | 11 | | | 4 | | 10 |
| 8 Feb | Midgam/Channel 10 | 23 | 5 | 10 | 23 | | 14 | 6 | 6 | 5 | 13 | | | 5 | | 10 |
| 7 Feb | Teleseker/Channel 1 | 27 | 6 | 11 | 23 | | 11 | 6 | 8 | 5 | 12 | | | 4 | | 7 |
| 6 Feb | Maagar Mochot/NRG | 25 | 4 | 11 | 24 | | 14 | 6 | 6 | 6 | 12 | | | 4 | | 8 |
| 6 Feb | Smith/Israel Radio | 26 | 5 | 9 | 25 | | 14 | 9 | 8 | 5 | 12 | | | 0 | | 7 |
| 6 Feb | Panels/Maariv | 26 | 5 | 11 | 22 | | 13 | 6 | 8 | 6 | 12 | | | 4 | | 7 |
| 6 Feb | Midgam/Yedioth Ahronoth | 24 | 6 | 11 | 25 | | 12 | 7 | 7 | 5 | 12 | | | 4 | | 7 |
| 5 Feb | Teleseker/Walla | 26 | 7 | 10 | 23 | | 12 | 7 | 7 | 4 | 12 | | | 4 | | 8 |
| 3 Feb | Panels/Knesset Channel | 25 | 5 | 11 | 24 | | 13 | 6 | 7 | 5 | 12 | | | 4 | | 8 |
| 1 Feb | Dialog/Haaretz | 25 | 6 | 9 | 23 | | 14 | 6 | 8 | 5 | 12 | | | 4 | | 8 |
| 30 Jan | Smith/Israel Radio | 26 | 5 | 8 | 26 | | 15 | 9 | 7 | 5 | 12 | | | 0 | | 7 |
| 30 Jan | Teleseker/Walla | 27 | 6 | 8 | 26 | | 12 | 7 | 7 | 4 | 12 | | | 4 | | 7 |
| 30 Jan | Panels/Maariv | 25 | 5 | 11 | 24 | | 14 | 7 | 8 | 6 | 12 | | | 0 | 0 | 8 |
| 29 Jan | Deadline for parties to submit final Knesset candidate lists to the Central Elections Commission | | | | | | | | | | | | | | | |
| 29 Jan | Otzma Yehudit and Yachad reach agreement to run a joint list | | | | | | | | | | | | | | | |
| 29 Jan | Smith/Globes | 24 | 5 | 9 | 25 | | 16 | 8 | 8 | 5 | 12 | | | 0 | 0 | 8 |
| 29 Jan | Teleseker/Channel 1 | 27 | 7 | 8 | 26 | | 14 | 7 | 8 | 5 | 12 | | | 0 | 0 | 6 |
| 28 Jan | Channel 10 | 23 | 4 | 10 | 25 | | 16 | 6 | 6 | 5 | 12 | | | 0 | 4 | 9 |
| 27 Jan | Panels/Knesset Channel | 23 | 6 | 11 | 25 | | 15 | 7 | 7 | 6 | 12 | | | 0 | 0 | 8 |
| 26 Jan | Channel 2/Midgam | 23 | 7 | 9 | 26 | | 15 | 7 | 7 | 6 | 12 | | | 0 | 0 | 8 |
| 24 Jan | Panels | 22 | 7 | 11 | 22 | | 13 | 6 | 7 | 6 | 11 | | | 7 | | 8 |
| 23 Jan | Israel Radio | 25 | 5 | 9 | 25 | | 16 | 9 | 7 | 5 | 12 | | | 0 | 0 | 7 |
| 22 Jan | United Arab List, Ta'al, Hadash, Balad and Islamic Movement in Israel reach agreement to run as a united list | | | | | | | | | | | | | | | |
| 22 Jan | Teleseker/Channel 1 | 26 | 7 | 8 | 24 | | 15 | 9 | 8 | 5 | 11 | | | 0 | 0 | 7 |
| 20 Jan | Knesset Channel/NRG | 40 (Note: Likud and Bayit Yehudi run a joint list - scenario) | 5 | 11 | 24 | | 40 | 4 | 7 | 6 | 11 | | | 0 | 6 | 6 |
| 20 Jan | Knesset Channel/NRG | 23 | 5 | 11 | 24 | | 16 | 5 | 7 | 6 | 12 | | | 0 | 4 | 8 |
| 16 Jan | Panels/Maariv | 22 | 6 | 11 | 25 | | 17 | 6 | 7 | 6 | 11 | | | 0 | 0 | 9 |
| 16 Jan | Teleseker/Walla | 24 | 5 | 8 | 26 | | 18 | 7 | 8 | 5 | 11 | | | 0 | 0 | 8 |
| 15 Jan | Midgam/Channel 2 | 23 | 6 | 11 | 25 | | 16 | 6 | 6 | 5 | 11 | | | 0 | 0 | 11 |
| 15 Jan | Channel 10 | 20 | 5 | 10 | 24 | | 16 | 6 | 7 | 6 | 12 | | | 0 | 4 | 10 |
| 14 Jan | Smith/Globes | 24 | 6 | 9 | 25 | | 15 | 8 | 7 | 6 | 6 | 5 | | 0 | 0 | 9 |
| 13 Jan | Panels/Knesset Channel | 23 | 7 | 12 | 24 | | 16 | 6 | 7 | 6 | 5 | 5 | 0 | 0 | 0 | 9 |
| 11 Jan | Teleseker | 24 | 7 | 10 | 23 | | 15 | 6 | 8 | 6 | 3 | 6 | 2 | 0 | 0 | 10 |
| 9 Jan | Teleseker/Walla-Maariv | 25 | 6 | 9 | 24 | | 15 | 6 | 8 | 6 | 11 | | | 0 | 0 | 10 |
| 7 Jan | Dialog/Haaretz | 22 | 6 | 12 | 23 | | 16 | 5 | 7 | 6 | 5 | 5 | 0 | 0 | 4 | 9 |
| 6 Jan | Teleseker/Channel 1 | 25 | 7 | 9 | 24 | | 15 | 6 | 8 | 7 | 11 | | | 0 | 0 | 8 |
| 6 Jan | Panels/Knesset Channel | 24 | 7 | 12 | 23 | | 15 | 6 | 8 | 6 | 11 | | | 0 | 0 | 8 |
| 2 Jan | Teleseker/Walla | 26 | 7 | 9 | 23 | | 16 | 6 | 7 | 7 | 11 | | | 0 | 0 | 8 |
| 2 Jan | Panels/Galay Israel Radio | 23 | 7 | 9 | 24 | | 16 | 7 | 7 | 7 | 6 | 5 | | 0 | 0 | 9 |
2014
| 31 Dec | Channel 10 | 21 | 7 | 9 | 23 | | 17 | 5 | 7 | 6 | 11 | | | 0 | 4 | 10 |
| 30 Dec | Panels/Knesset Channel | 23 | 5 | 10 | 24 | | 16 | 5 | 8 | 8 | 12 | | | 0 | 0 | 9 |
| 29 Dec | Midgam/Channel 2 | 24 | 8 | 9 | 24 | | 16 | 6 | 7 | 5 | 0 | 6 | 5 | 0 | 0 | 10 |
| 25 Dec | Sarid/Channel 2 | 22 | 10 | 9 | 25 | | 17 | 4 | 7 | 7 | 12 | | | 0 | 0 | 7 |
| 24 Dec | Jerusalem Post and Maariv/Panels | 23 | 5 | 11 | 24 | | 17 | 4 | 7 | 7 | 5 | 6 | 0 | 0 | 4 | 7 |
| 23 Dec | TRI/Nana 10 | 20 | 7 | 19 (Note: Yesh Atid and Kulanu run a joint list - scenario) | 21 | | 16 | 5 | 8 | 6 | 11 | | | 0 | 4 | 19 |
| 23 Dec | Channel 10 | 21 | 9 | 10 | 22 | | 17 | 4 | 7 | 6 | 5 | 6 | 0 | 0 | 4 | 9 |
| 22 Dec | Panels/Knesset Channel | 21 | 7 | 11 | 23 | | 16 | 5 | 7 | 7 | 5 | 5 | 0 | 0 | 4 | 9 |
| 21 Dec | Arutz 7/Geocartography | 27 | 8 | 7 | 25 | | 11 | 9 | 7 | 7 | 10 | | | 0 | 0 | 9 |
| 19 Dec | Smith/Reshet Bet | 22 | 8 | 8 | 23 | | 13 | 7 | 7 | 7 | 10 | | | 0 | 6 | 9 |
| 19 Dec | Smith/Globes | 23 | 9 | 8 | 23 | | 16 | 8 | 7 | 6 | 5 | 6 | | 0 | 0 | 9 |
| 18 Dec | Panels/Maariv | 21 | 8 | 10 | 23 | | 16 | 4 | 7 | 7 | 5 | 5 | 0 | 0 | 4 | 10 |
| 17 Dec | Haaretz/Dialog | 21 | 8 | 11 | 21 | | 16 | 4 | 8 | 6 | 5 | 5 | 0 | 0 | 3 | 12 |
| 16 Dec | Geocartography | 23 | 10 | 9 | 21 | | 16 | 6 | 7 | 7 | 5 | 5 | 0 | 4 | 0 | 11 |
| 16 Dec | Panels/Knesset Channel | 22 | 9 | 10 | 22 | | 15 | 4 | 7 | 7 | 5 | 5 | 0 | 0 | 4 | 10 |
| 15 Dec | Former Shas chairman Eli Yishai forms a new party, Yachad | | | | | | | | | | | | | | | |
| 12 Dec | Panels/NRG | 20 | 10 | 9 | 24 | | 17 | 6 | 8 | 6 | 5 | 5 | 0 | 0 | —N/a | 10 |
| 12 Dec | Geocartography | 25 | 9 | 8 | 18 | | 11 | 10 | 11 | 6 | 10 | | | 0 | —N/a | 12 |
| 11 Dec | Smith/Walla Poll | 18 | 10 | 10 | 21 | | 17 | 9 | 8 | 6 | 10 | | | 0 | —N/a | 9 |
| 11 Dec | Midgam/Channel 2 | 23 | 8 | 8 | 24 | | 15 | 9 | 8 | 5 | 11 | | | 0 | —N/a | 9 |
| 11 Dec | Panels/Maariv | 20 | 10 | 9 | 24 | | 17 | 6 | 8 | 6 | 5 | 5 | 0 | 0 | —N/a | 10 |
| 10 Dec | Labor (led by Isaac Herzog) and Hatnuah (led by Tzipi Livni) agree to run on a joint list, called Zionist Union | | | | | | | | | | | | | | | |
| 10 Dec | Channel 10 | 20 | 11 | 10 | 22 | | 15 | 7 | 7 | 6 | 5 | 5 | 0 | 0 | —N/a | 13 |
| 8 Dec | 19th Knesset dissolved, elections called | | | | | | | | | | | | | | | |
| 8 Dec | PanelPolitics | 21 | 9 | 9 | 23 | | 18 | 7 | 8 | 6 | 5 | 5 | 0 | 0 | —N/a | 9 |
| 8 Dec | Panels / Knesset Channel | 21 | 10 | 12 | 17 | 0 | 18 | 7 | 8 | 7 | 5 | 5 | 0 | 0 | —N/a | 10 |
| 5 Dec | Galay Israel/Maagar Mochot | 21 | 9 | 11 | 14 | 4 | 18 | 7 | 8 | 8 | 5 | 4 | 0 | 0 | —N/a | 11 |
| 5 Dec | NRG/Makor Rishon Maagar Mochot | 25 | 13 | 9 | 13 | 4 | 15 | 7 | 7 | 6 | 10 | | | 0 | —N/a | 10 |
| 5 Dec | New Wave/Yisrael Hayom | 22 | 10 | 10 | 12 | 4 | 16 | 8 | 8 | 6 | 5 | 4 | 2 | 0 | —N/a | 13 |
| 5 Dec | Jerusalem Post/Maariv Panels | 21 | 9 | 11 | 14 | 4 | 18 | 7 | 8 | 8 | 5 | 4 | 0 | 0 | —N/a | 11 |
| 4 Dec | Smith/Globes | 23 | 11 | 10 | 15 | 2 | 16 | 9 | 7 | 7 | 5 | 3 | 3 | 0 | —N/a | 10 |
| 3 Dec | Teleseker/Walla | 23 | 12 | 11 | 12 | 5 | 17 | 7 | 8 | 5 | 3 | 5 | 2 | 0 | —N/a | 10 |
| 2 Dec | Dialog/Channel 10 | 22 | 12 | 9 | 13 | 4 | 17 | 7 | 8 | 7 | 9 | | | 0 | —N/a | 12 |
| 2 Dec | Midgam/Channel 2 | 22 | 10 | 9 | 13 | 4 | 17 | 9 | 8 | 7 | 11 | | | 0 | —N/a | 10 |
| 2 Dec | Netanyahu dismisses Yair Lapid and Tzipi Livni from the cabinet | | | | | | | | | | | | | | | |
| 30 Nov | Dialog/Haaretz | 24 | 11 | 11 | 13 | 4 | 16 | 6 | 8 | 6 | 5 | 4 | 0 | 0 | —N/a | 12 |
| 27 Nov | Smith/Globes | 23 | 11 | 10 | 15 | 0 | 16 | 10 | 7 | 8 | 5 | 3 | 3 | 0 | —N/a | 9 |
| 27 Nov | Panels/Knesset Channel | 23 | 7 | 13 | 14 | 4 | 18 | 7 | 8 | 8 | 4 | 7 | | 0 | —N/a | 7 |
| 23 Nov | Coalition crisis begins as PM Netanyahu re-launches the Jewish nation-state bill | | | | | | | | | | | | | | | |
| 22 Nov | TRI/Bchardei chadrim | 27 | 8 | 10 | 12 | 3 | 17 | 10 | 8 | 8 | 11 | | | 0 | —N/a | 6 |
| 20 Nov | Panels/Knesset Channel | 20 | 8 | 13 | 13 | 4 | 19 | 7 | 8 | 8 | 4 | 7 | | 0 | —N/a | 9 |
| 17 Nov | Midgam/Channel 10 | 22 | 9 | 14 | 13 | 4 | 17 | 6 | 8 | 7 | 11 | | | 0 | —N/a | 9 |
| 15 Nov | Maagar Mochot/Channel 1 | 25 | 15 | 10 | 14 | 3 | 15 | 7 | 7 | 7 | 4 | 3 | 3 | 0 | —N/a | 6 |
| 13 Nov | Panels/Knesset Channel | 22 | 8 | 10 | 14 | 4 | 17 | 8 | 8 | 9 | 5 | 4 | 4 | 0 | —N/a | 7 |
| 3 Nov | Panels/NRG | 21 | 9 | 9 | 15 | 5 | 17 | 8 | 8 | 9 | 5 | 4 | 0 | 0 | —N/a | 7 |
| 31 Oct | Panels/Knesset Channel | 24 | 10 | 9 | 14 | 4 | 15 | 7 | 8 | 8 | 5 | 4 | 3 | 0 | —N/a | 9 |
| 30 Oct | Panels/Knesset Channel | 21 | 9 | 9 | 15 | 5 | 16 | 7 | 8 | 9 | 5 | 4 | 3 | 0 | —N/a | 9 |
| 23 Oct | Panels/Knesset Channel | 22 | 9 | 9 | 15 | 3 | 16 | 7 | 8 | 9 | 5 | 4 | 3 | 0 | —N/a | 10 |
| 23 Oct | Midgam/Channel 10 | 22 | 9 | 12 | 12 | 4 | 17 | 8 | 7 | 9 | 5 | 4 | 0 | 0 | —N/a | 11 |
| 2 Oct | Panels/Knesset Channel | 27 | 9 | 10 | 16 | 4 | 18 | 7 | 8 | 9 | 5 | 4 | 3 | 0 | —N/a | —N/a |
| 24 Sept | Panels/Maariv | 26 | 9 | 11 | 17 | 4 | 19 | 7 | 8 | 9 | 4 | 3 | 3 | 0 | —N/a | —N/a |
| 24 Sept | Smith/Globes | 25 | 10 | 11 | 14 | 4 | 15 | 9 | 7 | 7 | 5 | 4 | 3 | 0 | —N/a | 6 |
| 18 Sept | Panels/Knesset Channel | 25 | 8 | 12 | 16 | 4 | 20 | 8 | 8 | 9 | 4 | 3 | 3 | 0 | —N/a | —N/a |
| 17 Sept | Interior minister Gideon Sa'ar, no 2 of the leading Likud party, announces that he will take a timeout from politics | | | | | | | | | | | | | | | |
| 15 Sept | Maagar Mochot/Channel 10 | 26 | 14 | 8 | 13 | 5 | 16 | 10 | 6 | 5 | 10 | | | 0 | —N/a | 7 |
| 11 Sept | Panels/Knesset Channel | 29 | 9 | 11 | 15 | 4 | 18 | 7 | 8 | 10 | 3 | 3 | 3 | 0 | —N/a | —N/a |
| 8 Sept | Panels/Knesset Channel | 28 | 10 | 10 | 15 | 4 | 19 | 7 | 8 | 9 | 4 | 3 | 3 | 0 | —N/a | —N/a |
| 5 Sept | Maagar Mochot/NRG | 28 | 15 | 11 | 14 | 6 | 16 | 9 | 5 | 5 | 3 | 3 | 3 | 0 | —N/a | —N/a |
| 4 Sept | Panels/Knesset Channel | 29 | 9 | 10 | 15 | 4 | 18 | 8 | 8 | 9 | 4 | 3 | 3 | 0 | —N/a | —N/a |
| 1 Sept | Panels/Knesset Channel | 26 | 8 | 10 | 18 | 4 | 19 | 7 | 8 | 10 | 4 | 3 | 3 | 0 | —N/a | —N/a |
| 30 Aug | Maagar Mochot/Channel 1 | 26 | 12 | 8 | 14 | 4 | 18 | 10 | 7 | 6 | 7 | | | 0 | —N/a | 8 |
| 29 Aug | Geocartography | 32 | 17 | 9 | 12 | 0 | 18 | 7 | 10 | 6 | 4 | 0 | 5 | 0 | —N/a | —N/a |
| 28 Aug | Smith/Globes | 28 | 12 | 9 | 14 | 4 | 14 | 9 | 7 | 7 | 5 | 3 | 3 | 0 | —N/a | 5 |
| 28 Aug | Dialog/Haaretz | 26 | 11 | 12 | 14 | 4 | 17 | 7 | 8 | 7 | 6 | 4 | 4 | 0 | —N/a | —N/a |
| 28 Aug | Panels/Knesset Channel | 27 | 9 | 12 | 15 | 4 | 19 | 8 | 7 | 9 | 4 | 3 | 3 | 0 | —N/a | —N/a |
| 26 Aug | Ceasefire in the 2014 Israel–Gaza conflict | | | | | | | | | | | | | | | |
| 14 Aug | Panels/Knesset Channel | 28 | 9 | 11 | 15 | 4 | 19 | 7 | 7 | 10 | 4 | 3 | 3 | 0 | —N/a | —N/a |
| 7 Aug | Midgam/Channel 2 | 23 | 12 | 10 | 14 | 6 | 15 | 8 | 7 | 6 | 5 | 7 | | 0 | —N/a | 7 |
| 31 Jul | Panels/Knesset Channel | 30 | 8 | 10 | 15 | 4 | 18 | 9 | 7 | 10 | 3 | 3 | 3 | 0 | —N/a | —N/a |
| 31 Jul | Smith/Globes | 31 | 13 | 11 | 14 | 0 | 13 | 8 | 7 | 7 | 4 | 4 | 3 | 0 | —N/a | 6 |
| 9 Jul | Dialogue/Haaretz | 25 | 14 | 13 | 15 | 4 | 16 | 7 | 7 | 10 | 4 | 5 | 0 | 0 | —N/a | —N/a |
| 7 Jul | Panels/Knesset Channel | 21 | 11 | 11 | 19 | 5 | 18 | 6 | 7 | 11 | 4 | 3 | 4 | 0 | —N/a | —N/a |
| 7 Jul | Alliance between Likud and Yisrael Beiteinu dissolved | | | | | | | | | | | | | | | |
| 3 Jul | Panels/Knesset Channel | 28 | | 13 | 21 | 3 | 18 | 7 | 7 | 12 | 4 | 4 | 3 | 0 | —N/a | —N/a |
| 30 May | Smith/Globes | 34 | | 15 | 17 | 0 | 15 | 10 | 8 | 9 | 4 | 8 | | 0 | —N/a | —N/a |
| 1 May | Smith/Globes | 35 | | 14 | 19 | 0 | 12 | 10 | 8 | 10 | 4 | 4 | 4 | 0 | —N/a | —N/a |
| 15 Mar | Panels | 36 | | 12 | 20 | 4 | 15 | 7 | 7 | 11 | 4 | 0 | 0 | 4 | —N/a | —N/a |
| 10 Mar | Electoral threshold raised from 2% to 3.25% | | | | | | | | | | | | | | | |
| 7 Mar | Panels/Knesset Channel | 30 | | 12 | 21 | 4 | 15 | 6 | 8 | 11 | 4 | 3 | 3 | 3 | —N/a | —N/a |
| 28 Feb | Dialogue/Haaretz | 33 | | 14 | 16 | 5 | 12 | 10 | 6 | 10 | 4 | 5 | 3 | 0 | —N/a | —N/a |
| 27 Feb | Panels/Knesset Channel | 32 | | 13 | 21 | 4 | 13 | 7 | 6 | 10 | 4 | 4 | 3 | 3 | —N/a | —N/a |
| 11 Feb | Teleseker/Walla | 35 | | 15 | 15 | 6 | 14 | 11 | 7 | 6 | 4 | 4 | 3 | 0 | —N/a | —N/a |
| 6 Feb | Panels/Knesset Channel | 32 | | 14 | 18 | 4 | 15 | 7 | 6 | 11 | 4 | 4 | 3 | 0 | —N/a | —N/a |
| 3 Feb | Panels/Knesset Channel | 30 | | 13 | 19 | 5 | 16 | 9 | 6 | 11 | 4 | 3 | 4 | 0 | —N/a | —N/a |
| 31 Jan | Smith Poll | 36 | | 12 | 17 | 4 | 11 | 11 | 8 | 10 | 11 | | | 0 | —N/a | —N/a |
| 30 Jan | Panels/Knesset Channel | 30 | | 12 | 19 | 4 | 17 | 7 | 7 | 11 | 4 | 3 | 4 | 0 | —N/a | —N/a |
| 24 Jan | Times of Israel | 46 | | 13 | 18 | 5 | 7 | 11 | 6 | 6 | 8 | | | 0 | —N/a | —N/a |
| 23 Jan | Panels/Knesset Channel | 34 | | 14 | 17 | 6 | 12 | 8 | 6 | 10 | 4 | 4 | 3 | 0 | —N/a | —N/a |
| 22 Jan | GeoCartography | 40 | | 9 | 12 | 3 | 11 | 12 | 6 | 10 | 11 | | | 0 | —N/a | —N/a |
| 21 Jan | Channel 1 | 34 | | 13 | 16 | 4 | 13 | 10 | 7 | 7 | 11 | | | 3 | —N/a | —N/a |
| 16 Jan | Panels/Knesset Channel | 34 | | 15 | 19 | 5 | 12 | 9 | 7 | 8 | 4 | 4 | 3 | 0 | —N/a | —N/a |
| 9 Jan | Panels/Knesset Channel | 34 | | 13 | 17 | 5 | 14 | 9 | 7 | 10 | 4 | 4 | 3 | 0 | —N/a | —N/a |
| 5 Jan | Channel 2/Dahaf | 33 | | 14 | 16 | 7 | 11 | 10 | 7 | 7 | 4 | 4 | 3 | 2 | —N/a | —N/a |
2013
| 26 Dec | Smith poll | 36 | | 10 | 19 | 3 | 13 | 11 | 8 | 9 | 11 | | | 0 | —N/a | —N/a |
| 26 Dec | Knesset/Panel Polls | 33 | | 13 | 16 | 6 | 13 | 10 | 6 | 11 | 4 | 3 | 3 | 0 | —N/a | —N/a |
| 25 Dec | Midgam/Walla | 32 | | 14 | 17 | 7 | 11 | 9 | 6 | 7 | 4 | 4 | 3 | 2 | —N/a | —N/a |
| 28 Nov | Globes/Smith | 37 | | 11 | 19 | 3 | 12 | 10 | 8 | 9 | 4 | 4 | 3 | 0 | —N/a | —N/a |
| 28 Nov | Knesset/Panel Polls | 35 | | 10 | 19 | 4 | 12 | 10 | 6 | 13 | 4 | 4 | 3 | 0 | —N/a | —N/a |
| Date | Poll | Likud | Yisrael Beiteinu | Yesh Atid | Labor | Hatnuah | Jewish Home | Shas | UTJ | Meretz | Hadash | UAL- Ta'al | Balad | Otzma | Yachad | Kulanu |

== Other polls ==
- An iStudent poll (January 2015) found that, among college and university students, the Zionist Union would receive 30 mandates; Jewish Home, 26; and Likud, 16.
