= Thirty-fourth government of Israel =

2015–20 government led by Benjamin Netanyahu

Fourth Netanyahu cabinet
- 34th Cabinet of Israel

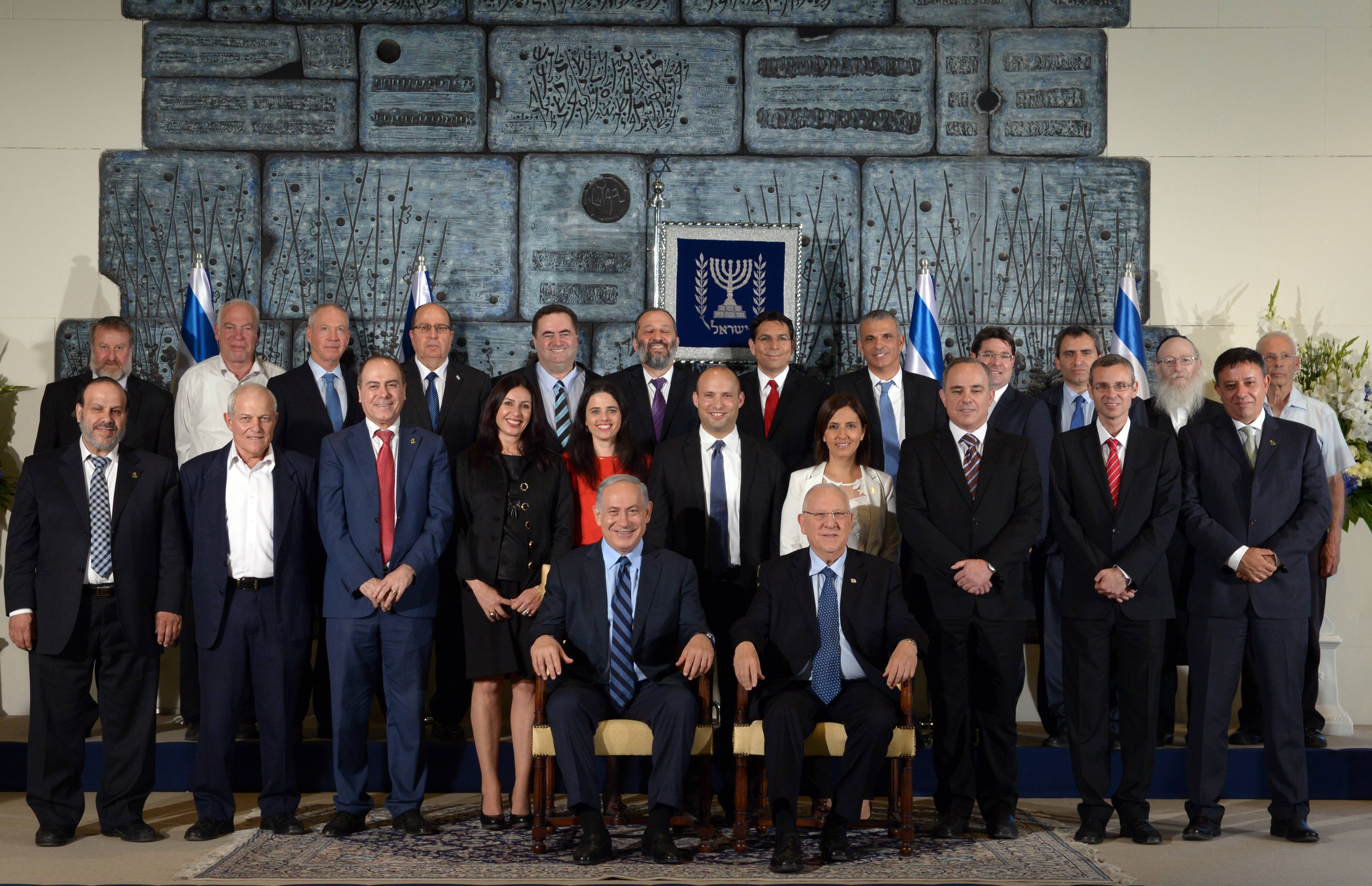
- The ministers of the government, and president Reuven Rivlin
- Date formed: 14 May 2015
- Date dissolved: 17 May 2020

People and organisations
- Head of state: Reuven Rivlin
- Head of government: Benjamin Netanyahu
- No. of ministers: 21
- Member parties: Likud; Kulanu; Shas; United Torah Judaism; The Jewish Home; Yisrael Beiteinu (2016–2018); New Right (2018–2019; 2019-)
- Status in legislature: Coalition
- Opposition party: Zionist Union, Blue and White
- Opposition leaders: Isaac Herzog; Tzipi Livni; Shelly Yachimovich; Benny Gantz

History
- Outgoing formation: 2019–2022 political crisis
- Election: 2015 Knesset election
- Legislature terms: 20th, 21st and 22nd Knessets
- Predecessor: 33rd government
- Successor: 35th government

The thirty-fourth government of Israel, (Hebrew:ממשלת ישראל השלושים וארבע) also known as the Fourth Netanyahu Government, was the government of Israel, headed by Prime Minister Benjamin Netanyahu between 2015 and 2020. It was formed after the March 2015 Knesset election. The coalition that made up the government, consisting of Likud, United Torah Judaism, Shas, Kulanu and the Jewish Home, was submitted to the President of Israel just before the deadline on 6 May 2015. Government ministers were introduced, approved by the Knesset and sworn in on 14 May. Deputy ministers were sworn in on 19 May. On 29 December 2018, the newly formed New Right party became a coalition partner, after splitting from the Jewish Home.

Between them, the coalition parties held 61 of the 120 seats in the Knesset. The elections that led to the formation of the government were a result of events on 2 December 2014, when Netanyahu dismissed two of his ministers, whose parties' members subsequently resigned from the 33rd government, dissolving the government ahead of schedule.

During the 34th government, several corruption cases arose in regards to Netanyahu. Justice Minister Ayelet Shaked stated that even if indicted, Netanyahu would still be able to continue as Prime Minister. On 26 December 2018, Knesset members officially passed a law dispersing the Knesset. The Knesset reassembled following the April 2019 Israeli legislative election, only to be dispersed once again on 30 May 2019 after Netanyahu failed to form a new cabinet.

== Formation ==
=== Recommendations ===
Israeli government formation, March–May 2015
- 31 March–14 May 2015
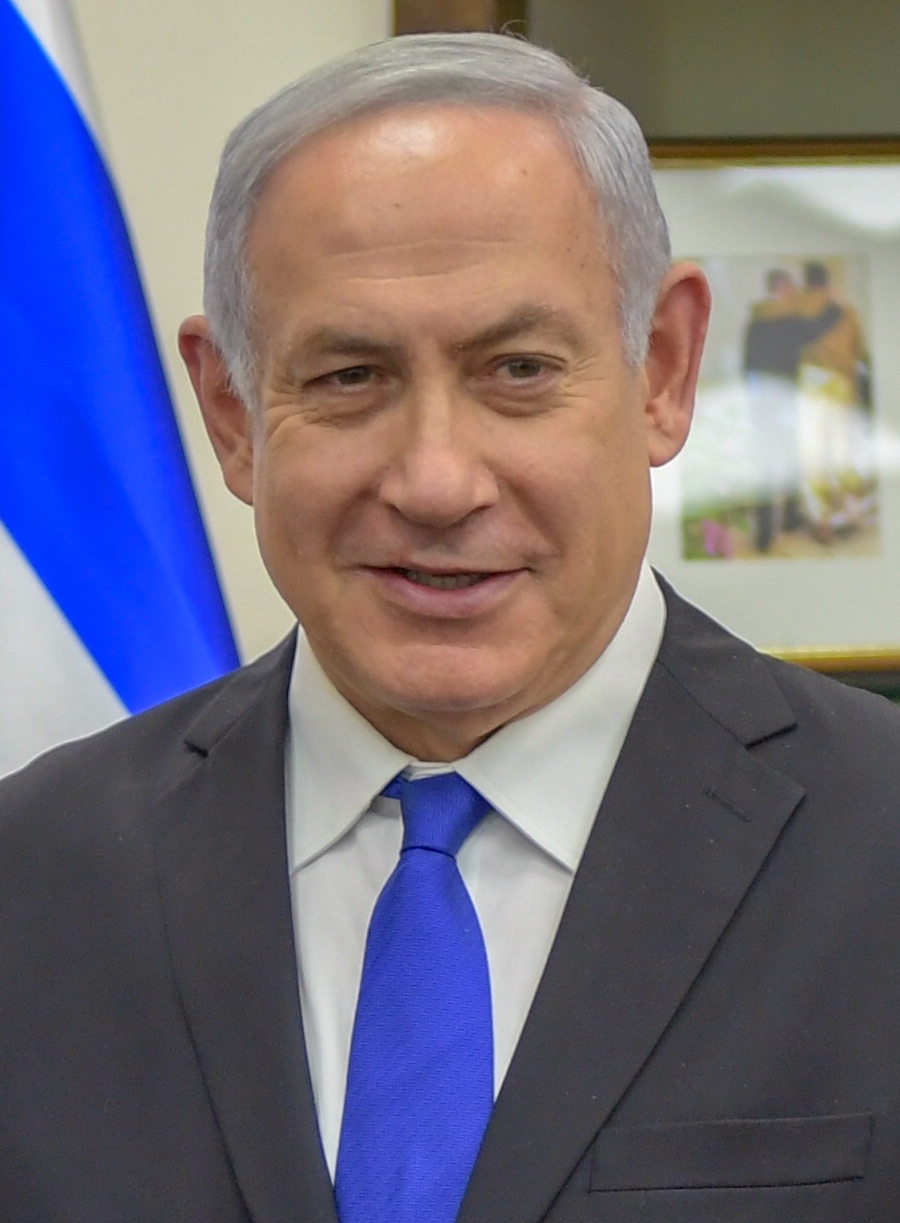

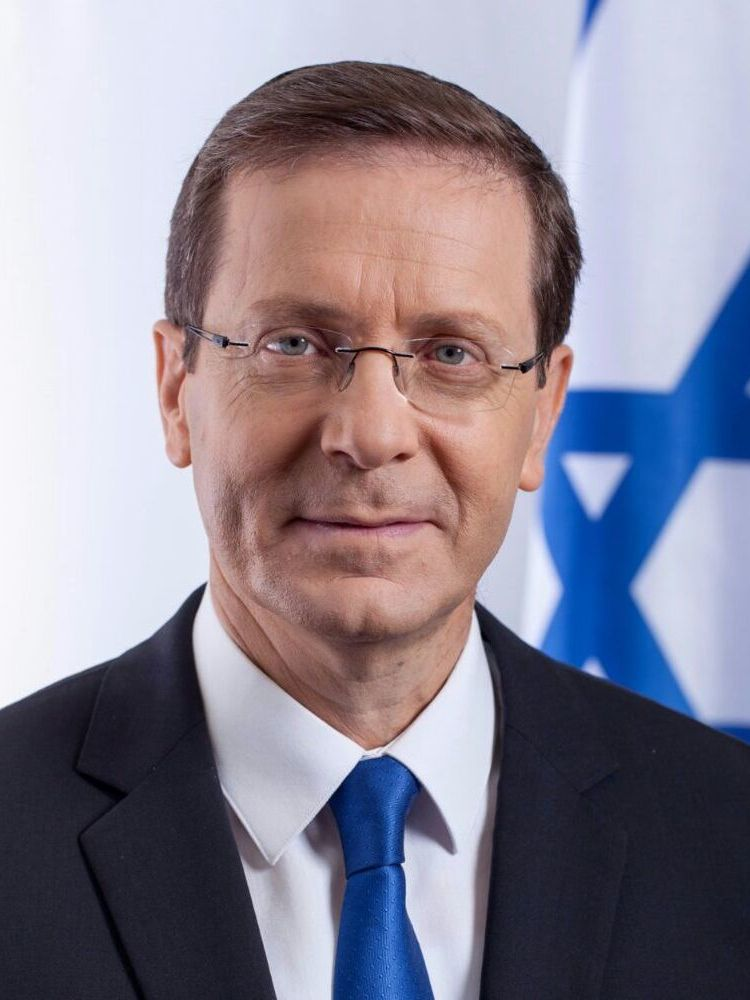
Nominee	Benjamin Netanyahu	Isaac Herzog
Party	Likud	Zionist Union
Electoral vote	67	29
Percentage	55.8%	24.2%
Prime Minister before election
Benjamin Netanyahu
Likud
Elected Prime Minister
Benjamin Netanyahu
Likud

Party	Party Leader	Seats	Recommended
Likud	Benjamin Netanyahu	30	Benjamin Netanyahu
Zionist Union	Isaac Herzog	24	Isaac Herzog
Joint List	Ayman Odeh	13	No one
Yesh Atid	Yair Lapid	11	No one
Kulanu	Moshe Kahlon	10	Benjamin Netanyahu
The Jewish Home	Naftali Bennett	8	Benjamin Netanyahu
Shas	Aryeh Deri	7	Benjamin Netanyahu
Yisrael Beiteinu	Avigdor Lieberman	6	Benjamin Netanyahu
UTJ	Yaakov Litzman	6	Benjamin Netanyahu
Meretz	Zehava Gal-On	5	Isaac Herzog

Terms of coalition agreements are considered binding law in Israel. As such, parties must adhere to the agreements made with the Prime Minister when the coalition was formed.

Changes to the responsibilities of official positions include the relinquishment of the Justice Minister's ability to appoint judges to religious courts. Also, the Religious Affairs Minister will not have control over affairs connected to conversion to Judaism; that will be under the purview of the Prime Minister's office.

=== Coalition agreements ===
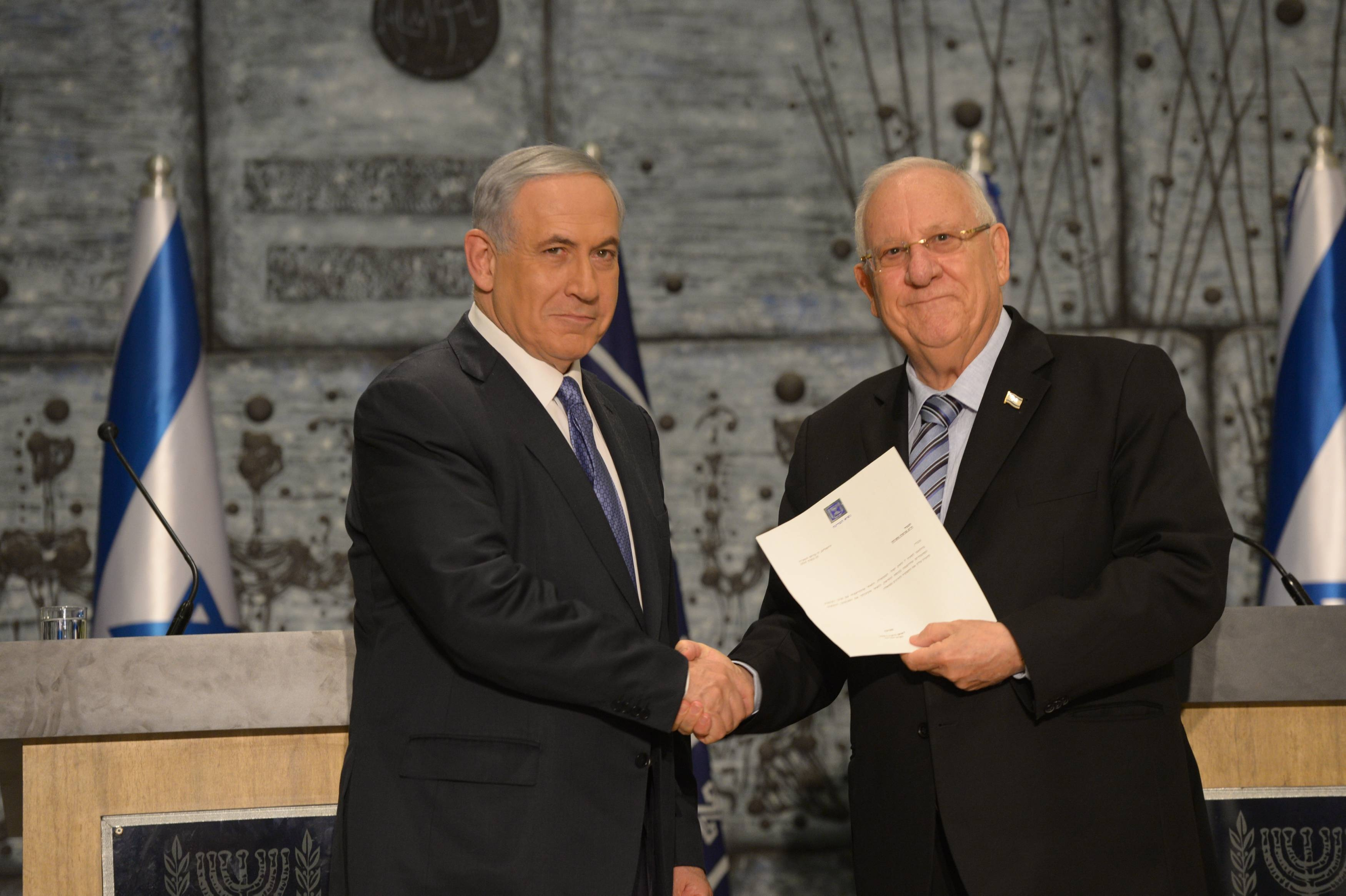
President Reuven Rivlin (right) assigned the task of forming the new government to Prime Minister Benjamin Netanyahu (left) in an official ceremony held on 25 March 2015.

In April 2015, Likud reached an agreement with Kulanu, where Kulanu agreed to support the implementation of the Norwegian Law, allowing members of the Knesset to exit the Knesset upon receiving a post in the cabinet. In return, Likud agreed to raise the salary of soldiers, give unemployment insurance to self-employed workers and set a biennial budget by October 2015. Likud also signed separate agreements with United Torah Judaism, which involved social services including childcare and dental care, and with Shas.

On 6 May, just hours before the deadline, Likud secured an agreement with The Jewish Home. The agreement would increase NIS 630 million ($163.4 million) for the education budget, an allocation of NIS 1 billion ($259 million) to raise soldiers' pay during their third year of service, a budget increase for Ariel University in the West Bank, and support for the so-called NGO bill. This gave the coalition 61 Knesset seats just enough to govern, with the government sworn in on 14 May.

== Policy guidelines ==
The policy guidelines for the 34th government included, but were not limited to:

- Strengthening the rule of law
- Reducing the cost of living
- Increasing competition, especially in the financial sector, and granting easier access to credit for small and medium businesses
- Integrating disabled persons into society, in providing education and employment aid
- Advancing the peace process with the Palestinians and other neighbors, while keeping Israel's national interests

== Members of government ==
=== Ministers ===
These ministers served during the 20th Knesset from 2015 to 2018. However, as both the April 2019 and September 2019 elections failed to produce a government, the ministers remained in a caretaking capacity. On 17 May 2020, the ministers ended their posts with the formation of the 35th government.

Portfolio	Minister	Party
Prime Minister	Benjamin Netanyahu	Likud
Minister of Defense
Minister of Defense	Moshe Ya'alon (May 2015 - May 2016)	Likud
Minister of Defense	Benjamin Netanyahu (22-30 May 2016)	Likud
Minister of Defense	Avigdor Lieberman (May 2016 - Nov. 2018)	Yisrael Beiteinu
Minister of Defense	Benjamin Netanyahu (Nov. 2018 - Nov. 2019)	Likud
Minister of Defense	Naftali Bennett (Nov. 2019 - May 2020)	New Right
Minister of Foreign Affairs; Minister of Intelligence and Atomic Energy	Israel Katz	Likud
Ministry of Aliyah and Integration
Ministry of Aliyah and Integration	Ze'ev Elkin (May 2015 - May 2016)	Likud
Ministry of Aliyah and Integration	Sofa Landver (May 2016 - Nov. 2018)	Yisrael Beiteinu
Ministry of Aliyah and Integration	Benjamin Netanyahu (Nov. - Dec. 2018)	Likud
Ministry of Aliyah and Integration	Yariv Levin (Dec. 2018 - Jan. 2019)	Likud
Ministry of Aliyah and Integration	Yoav Gallant (Jan. 2019 - May 2020)	Likud
Minister of Construction	Yoav Gallant (May 2015 - Jan. 2019)	Kulanu
Minister of Construction	Yifat Shasha-Biton (Jan 2019 - May 2020)	Kulanu
Minister of Culture and Sport	Miri Regev	Likud
Minister of the Interior; Minister of the Development of the Negev and Galilee	Aryeh Deri	Shas
Minister of Religious Affairs	Yitzhak Vaknin	Shas
Minister of the Economy	Aryeh Deri (May 2015 - Aug. 2016)	Shas
Minister of the Economy	Benjamin Netanyahu (Nov. 2015 - Aug. 2016)	Likud
Minister of the Economy	Moshe Kahlon (Aug. 2016 - Jan. 2017)	Kulanu
Minister of the Economy	Eli Cohen (Jan. 2017 - May 2020)	Likud
Minister of Finance	Moshe Kahlon	Likud
Minister of Health	Benjamin Netanyahu (May - Aug. 2015)	Likud
Minister of Health	Yaakov Litzman (Aug. 2015 - Nov. 2017)	United Torah Judaism
Minister of Health	Benjamin Netanyahu (Nov. 2017 - Dec. 2019)	Likud
Minister of Health	Yaakov Litzman (Dec. 2019 - May 2020)	United Torah Judaism
Minister of Jerusalem; Minister of Environmental Protection	Ze'ev Elkin	Likud
Minister of Internal Security; Minister of Strategic Affairs; Minister of Information	Gilad Erdan	Likud
Minister of Tourism	Yariv Levin	Likud
Minister of Justice	Ayelet Shaked (May 2015 - Jun. 2019)	The Jewish Home
Minister of Justice	Ayelet Shaked (May 2015 - Jun. 2019)	New Right
Minister of Justice	Amir Ohana (Jun. 2019 - May 2020)	Likud
Minister of National Infrastructure, Energy and Water	Yuval Steinitz	Likud
Minister of Regional Cooperation; Minister of Agriculture and Rural Development	Tzachi Hanegbi	Likud
Minister of Science and Technology; Minister of Welfare and Social Services	Ofir Akunis	Likud
Minister for Senior Citizens	Gila Gamliel	Likud
Minister of Communications	Dudi Amsalem	Likud
Minister of Education	Naftali Bennett (May 2015 - Jun. 2019)	The Jewish Home
Minister of Education	Naftali Bennett (May 2015 - Jun. 2019)	New Right
Minister of Education	Rafi Peretz (Jun. 2019 - May 2020)	URWP
Minister of Transportation	Israel Katz (May 2015 - Jun. 2019)	Likud
Minister of Transportation	Bezalel Smotrich (Jun. 2019 - May 2020)	URWP
Minister of Diaspora Affairs	Tzipi Hotovely	Likud

Deri resigned his post as Minister of the Economy, reportedly over an unpopular gas monopoly deal. Netanyahu took over the portfolio, and promised to speed up the deal. Netanyahu resigned his post as Minister of Communications following an investigation into his relationship with the media, and was replaced temporarily by Tzachi Hanegbi. The Ministry for Senior Citizens was renamed Ministry for Social Equality in August 2015.

=== Deputy ministers ===
Portfolio	Minister	Party
Deputy Minister of Defense	Eli Ben-Dahan (May 2015 - Oct. 2019)	The Jewish Home
Deputy Minister of Education	Meir Porush	United Torah Judaism
Deputy Minister of Interior	Meshulam Nahari	Shas
Deputy Minister of Labor, Social Affairs and Social Services	Meshulam Nahari	Shas

== Security cabinet ==
Minister	Party
Benjamin Netanyahu (chairman)	Likud
Naftali Bennett	New Right
Amir Ohana	Likud
Gilad Erdan	Likud
Moshe Kahlon	Kulanu
Israel Katz	Likud
Yoav Gallant	Likud
Aryeh Deri	Shas
Bezalel Smotrich	Union of the Right-Wing Parties
Eli Cohen	Likud
Yuval Steinitz	Likud
Ze'ev Elkin	Likud
Rafi Peretz	Union of the Right-Wing Parties

== Committee chairs ==
Committee	Chairman	Party
Economic Affairs Committee	Eitan Cabel	Zionist Union
Education, Culture, and Sports Committee	Ya'akov Margi	Shas
Ethics Committee	Yitzhak Vaknin	Shas
Finance Committee	Moshe Gafni	United Torah Judaism
Foreign Affairs and Defense Committee	Avi Dichter (Before 10/3/19)	Likud
Foreign Affairs and Defense Committee	Gabi Ashkenazi (since 10/3/19)	Blue and White
House Committee	David Bitan	Likud
Committee for Immigration, Absorption and Diaspora Affairs	Avraham Neguise	Likud
Internal Affairs and Environment Committee	Dudu Amsalem	Likud
Labor, Welfare and Health Committee	Eli Alaluf	Kulanu
Constitution, Law and Justice Committee	Nissan Slomiansky	The Jewish Home
Science and Technology Committee	Uri Maklev	United Torah Judaism
State Control Committee	Karin Elharar	Yesh Atid
Committee on the Status of Women and Gender Equality	Aida Touma-Suleiman	Joint List
Special Committee for Discussion of the Public Broadcast Bill 2015	Stav Shaffir	Zionist Union
Special Committee for Public Petitions	Yisrael Eichler	United Torah Judaism
Special Committee for the Rights of the Child	Yifat Shasha-Biton	Kulanu
Special Committee for the Transparency and Accessibility of Government Information	Stav Shaffir	Zionist Union
Special Committee on Drug and Alcohol Abuse	Tamar Zandberg	Meretz
Special Committee to Discuss the National Authority for Urban Renewal Bill	Eli Cohen	Kulanu
Source: Knesset

== Government agencies and special committees ==
Agency / Committee	Chairman	Party
Israel Land Administration	Yoav Gallant	Likud
World Zionist Organization’s Settlement Division	Avraham Duvdevani	
Israel Atomic Energy Commission	Zeev Shnir	

== Policies ==
=== Economy ===
In June 2015, finance minister Moshe Kahlon announced a temporary measure to increase taxes on second home purchases in order to deter investors from buying up real estate. This tax hike ended in July 2020 when it reverted back to 5%.

In June 2016, the finance ministry reached an agreement with the Bank of Israel to create a committee aimed at improving economic competition in the banking sector. In December, the Knesset passed legislation that would separate credit card companies from banks in three years along with other reforms in the sector.

=== National identity ===
In July 2018, the Knesset passed Basic Law: Israel as the Nation-State of the Jewish People, which defined the State of Israel as the nation state of the Jewish people.
