= Tali Ploskov =

Israeli politician

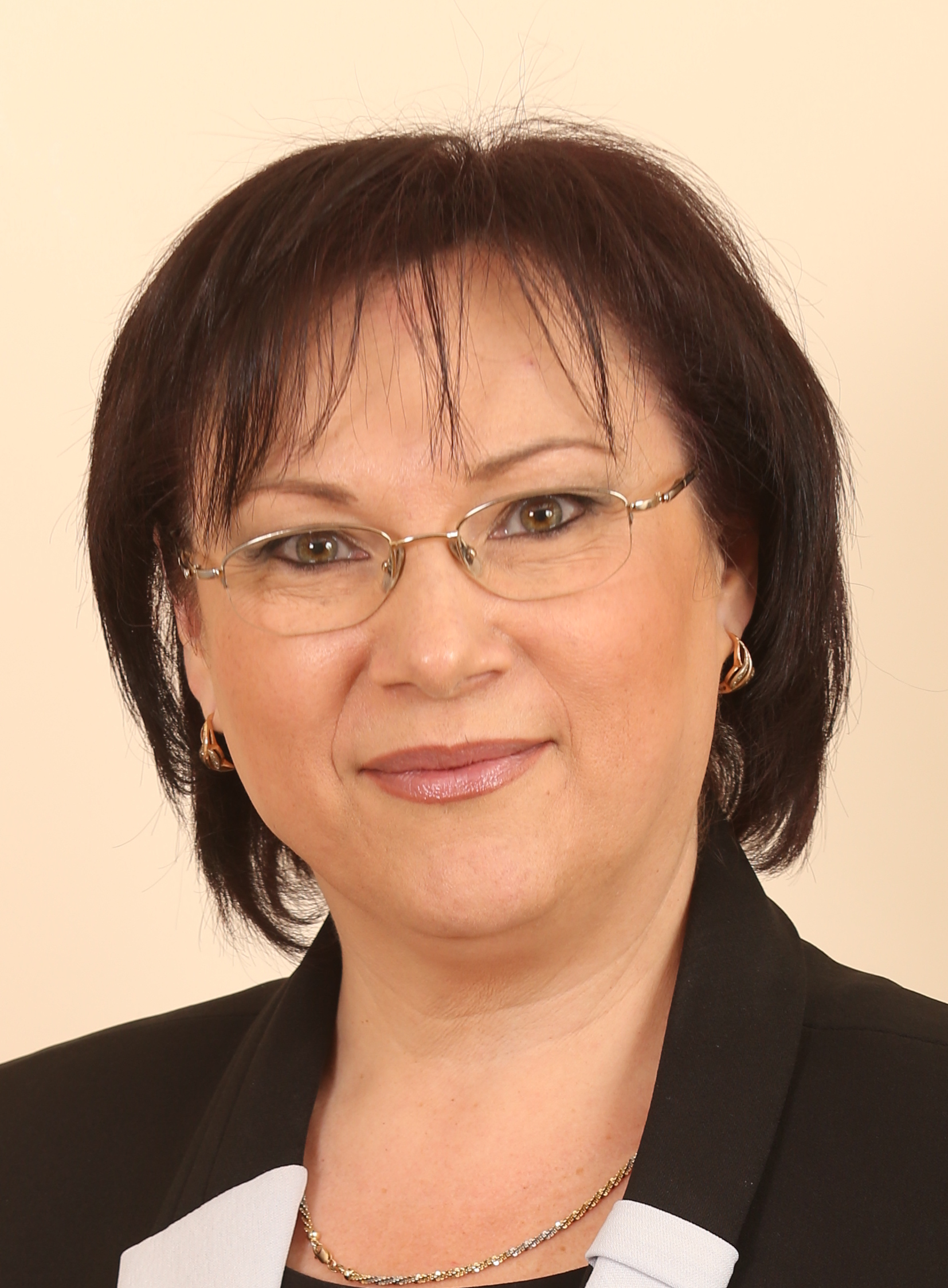
- Ploskov in 2015

Faction represented in the Knesset
- 2015–2019: Kulanu
- 2020–2021: Likud
- 2022: Likud

Personal details
- Born: 30 July 1962 (age 64) Bălți, Soviet Union

Tali Ploskov (Hebrew: טלי פלוסקוב; born 30 July 1962) is an Israeli politician who served as a member of the Knesset for Likud and Kulanu in three spells between 2015 and 2022.

== Early life and education ==
Ploskov was born in Bălți, Moldavian SSR in the Soviet Union (today in Moldova). She worked in the school system in the city until emigrating to Israel in 1991. Ploskov obtained a BA in psychology and is studying economics.

== Career ==
After arriving in Israel she worked as a nurse in a nursing home. She later became a maid at a hotel on the Dead Sea, before starting to work at a bank.

A member of Yisrael Beiteinu, she was elected to Arad City Council, was deputy mayor in 2007, and in 2010 won the city's mayoral election, becoming the first female Soviet immigrant to hold a mayoralty. She was re-elected in 2014 with 55% of the vote.

Prior to the 2015 elections, Ploskov joined the new Kulanu party, and was placed sixth on its list. She was elected to the Knesset as the party won ten seats. During her first term in the Knesset she served as Deputy Speaker of the Knesset. She was fifth on the party's list for the April 2019 elections, but lost her seat as the party was reduced to four seats. She subsequently joined Likud and was elected back to the Knesset in the 2020 elections. Placed thirty-first on the Likud list for the March 2021 elections, she lost her seat as Likud was reduced to 30 seats. However, she re-entered the Knesset in August 2022 after the resignation of Gadi Yevarkan.

Ploskov was placed seventy-first on the Likud list for the 2022 elections and lost her seat.
