= Tsega Melaku =

Israeli author, journalist, community activist and politician

- צֶגָה מֶלָקוּ
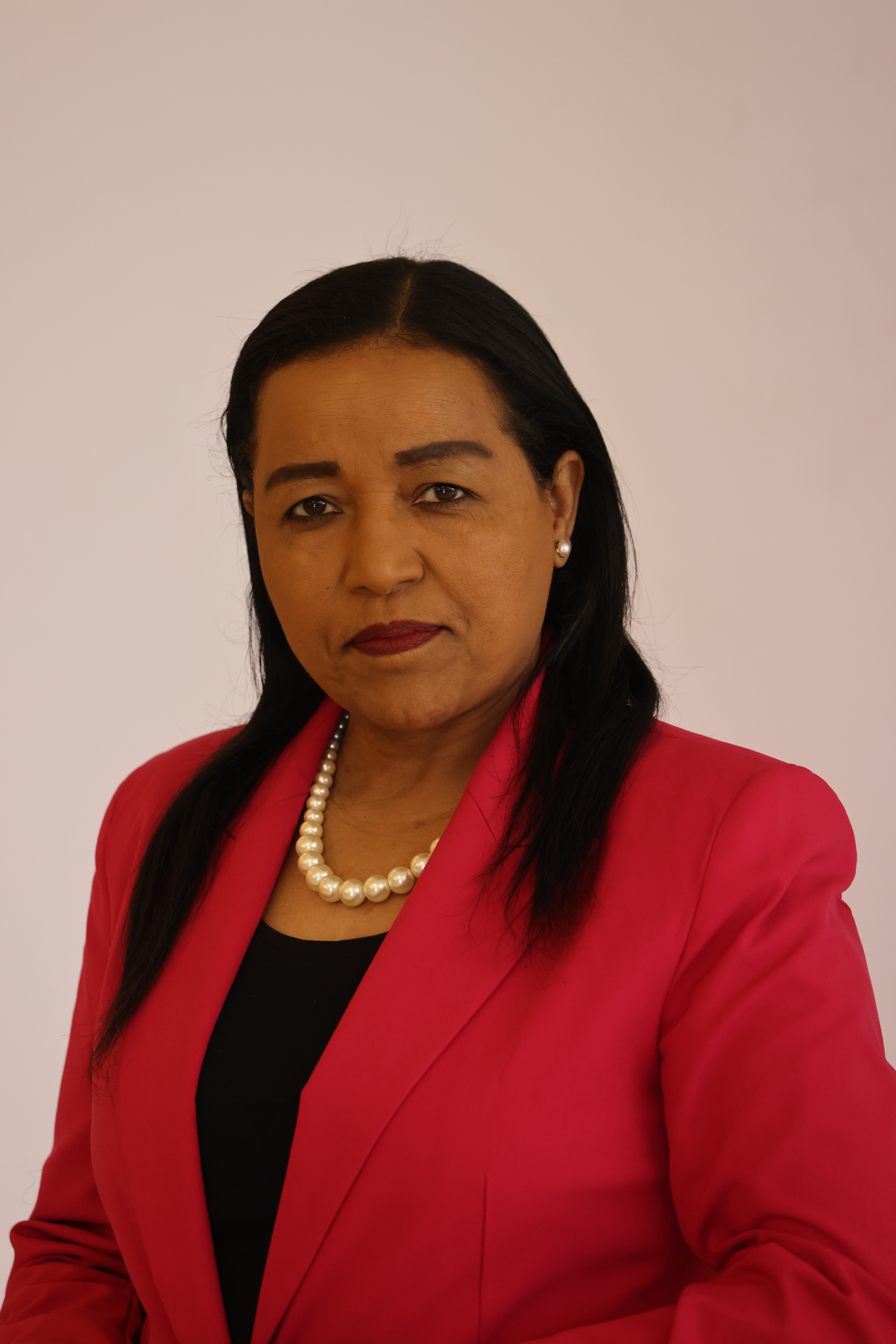
- Tsega Melaku in 2023

Faction represented in the Knesset
- 2023–2026: Likud

Personal details
- Born: Tsega Tseganesh Melaku; 1 January 1966 (age 60) Gondar, Ethiopia
- Citizenship: Israel
- Party: Likud (since 2022)
- Other political affiliations: Kulanu (2015)
- Children: 2
- Education: Bar-Ilan University
- Occupation: Journalist • Politician

Tsega Tseganesh Melaku (Hebrew: צֶגָה מֶלָקוּ; born 1 January 1966) is an Israeli author, journalist, community activist and politician who served as a member of the Knesset for Likud from 2023 to 2026. She is the former director of Kol Yisrael's Reshet Aleph ("Network A") radio station. Melaku was disqualified from running in Israel's 2015 election with the Kulanu party for failing to complete her cooling-off period from government service, where it was believed she could become a Member of the Knesset. She then became an MK in 2023 after running with Likud in the previous year's election. She announced in August 2026 that she would not run in the party's upcoming primary.

== Early life and education ==
Melaku was born in Gondar, Ethiopia, and left her family in her native Ethiopia to emigrate to Israel in 1984 at the age of 16. She recalls that her first defense of her rights in Israel was to insist on keeping her first name, instead of adopting the Hebraicized "Oshra", a name given to her on her arrival. "When we arrived in Jerusalem, we thought that the people would greet us with open arms", she remembers. "But when we got here, everyone looked at us suspiciously and did not believe that we were really Jewish. I was shocked too, because I had never seen white Jews before. It was ironic really because they thought that we were the ones who weren't Jewish."

She attended Bar-Ilan University, where she earned a BA in Political Science and Sociology. Then, while studying at Touro College in Jerusalem for her MA in business, she was one of the first Keren Hanan Aynor scholarship recipients.

== Career ==
In 2008, Melaku was appointed as director of the radio station Reshet Aleph, the first woman or Ethiopian immigrant to hold that role. She described her goals for the station as breaking down "the elitist approach to culture in this country and make sure that everyone can get his say, not just those who are from Tel Aviv. I want everyone to be able to hold the microphone and speak out about issues." She is the manager and a presenter for an Amharic-language radio show on Israel Radio's Reka station. She has had a profound impact on the Ethiopian community, according to Len Lyons: "Under her direction, Amharic radio for the Ethiopian Israeli community has become an essential resource for education and social awareness.

She is a community activist in Israel's Ethiopian community. She was active in 1996 protests against Magen David Adom's policy on Ethiopian blood donations, following the publication of a news story which revealed that blood from Ethiopian Israelis was thrown away due to fears it would contain HIV. Melaku works on behalf of several non-profit organizations that promote higher education for Ethiopian immigrants.

When he announced her candidacy for the Knesset, Moshe Kahlon, the Kulanu party leader, called her a woman of "fortitude and strong will". Melaku articulated her reasons for embracing a political career, which include the corruption and racism she has witnessed: "Until today, everywhere I go, one question follows me: 'Miss, I need my house cleaned twice a week. Are you free for cleaning?'", Melaku said. "Today, I say, 'Yes, I'm free to clean up. Not houses, but corruption. I'm ready to clean up opacity, to clean up seeing others as inferior because of their name, their accent, their skin colour."

After Melaku's candidacy was announced, Judge Salim Joubran, Chairman of the Central Elections Committee, ruled that as a former broadcaster for the Reshet Aleph radio, Melaku would be disqualified from candidacy in the upcoming elections because she did not complete the 100-day "cooling-off" period since leaving her broadcasting job. The party disagreed with the decision, noting that her position as a manager was not a senior appointment and that the hiatus regulation should therefore not apply.

In February 2016, the Israeli Justice Ministry announced that the Israeli government had formed a new inter-ministerial task force to examine racism against Ethiopian-Israelis. The purpose is to create effective tools and methods to combat discrimination. There are three sub-teams within the task force, and Melaku will lead the one focused on raising public awareness of racism and enhancing the visibility of Ethiopian-Israeli Jews in the public sphere.

In 2022, ahead of that year's legislative election, Melaku was given the 37th spot on Likud's electoral list by Benjamin Netanyahu. She was not elected to the Knesset as the party won 32 seats, but subsequently entered the Knesset on 9 February 2023 as a replacement for Ofir Akunis, who resigned under the Norwegian Law.

Melaku, as a member of the State Control Committee, voted in October 2025 against the creation of a commission of inquiry on the 7 October attacks.

She announced in August 2026 that she would not run in the 2026 Likud primary ahead of the 2026 Israeli legislative election.

== Publications ==
Melaku is the author of the book Not in Our School, which documents the racism she faced in her effort to have her children attend a better school.
