= Kulanu =

Israeli centrist political party

Kulanu כולנו
- Leader: Moshe Kahlon
- Founded: 27 November 2014
- Dissolved: 28 May 2019
- Split from: Likud, Kadima
- Merged into: Likud
- Ideology: Consumer protection; Social liberalism
- Political position: Centre to centre-right
- National affiliation: Likud (2019–2020)
- Colours: Sky blue
- Most MKs: 10 (2015)

Election symbol
- כ

Kulanu (Hebrew: כולנו, lit. 'All of Us') was a centrist political party in Israel founded by Moshe Kahlon that focused on economic and cost-of-living issues.

== History ==
The party was established on 27 November 2014 following months of speculation that Kahlon would form a new party after he took a break from politics in 2013. Opinion polls in the summer of 2014 had suggested that a new party formed by Kahlon could win 5–8 seats in the Knesset. When the party was established, its registration forms listed Kahlon, Orna Angel and Avi Gabbay as its founders.

Although the party initially lacked a name, on 10 December 2014 it was announced that it would be named Kulanu. In the week following its establishment, initial opinion polls put it at 10–13 seats. Polls also projected that if Kulanu formed a list with Yesh Atid, the alliance could win 24 seats in the 20th Knesset, which would have made it the largest faction. However, Kahlon and Yesh Atid leader Yair Lapid both denied their parties would form a joint ticket.

Prime Minister Benjamin Netanyahu reportedly offered Kahlon the post of Finance Minister as well as portfolios for others in the next government if he agreed to a joint ticket with Likud, but Kahlon declined. Nevertheless, Likud admitted on the day of the 2015 Israeli elections to having forged a recording of Kahlon promising to support Netanyahu that had been distributed to voters the night prior. Calling the forgery "criminal", Kahlon asked for an investigation by the election committee. On 17 April 2020, a source close to Kahlon told Al-Monitor that Kahlon was speeding up his already-planned retirement from Netanyahu's government and was now planning to resign before a new Israeli government was formed.

== 2015 candidate list ==
The party's candidate list for the 2015 election was:

1. Moshe Kahlon, former Likud MK and Kulanu party founder and chairman.
2. Yoav Gallant, retired IDF major general (remains in reserves) and former head of IDF Southern Command.
3. Eli Alaluf, former head of the Israel anti-poverty commission. Alaluf was originally in the number eight spot, and Tsega Melaku, Ethiopian-born Israeli and Israel Radio broadcaster, was originally in the number three spot. However, Melaku was disqualified by the Israeli Central Elections Committee because she did not resign from her state broadcasting position before the required hundred-day "cooling-off period" in advance of election day.
4. Michael Oren, former Israeli ambassador to the United States (2009–2013). Oren's candidacy was announced by Kahlon early on 24 December 2014.
5. Rachel Azaria, deputy mayor of Jerusalem and feminist leader known for activism against exclusion of women.
6. Tali Ploskov, Moldovan-born Israeli, mayor of Arad and former member of Yisrael Beytenu. Alaluf was formerly in the spot, but he was moved to number three.
7. Yifat Shasha-Biton, education expert and former Kiryat Shemona deputy mayor.
8. Eli Cohen, accountant and vice president of Israel Land Development Company.
9. Roy Folkman, former adviser to Jerusalem mayor Nir Barkat.
10. Meirav Ben-Ari, attorney and Tel Aviv council member.
11. Shai Babad, former CEO of Zim Integrated Shipping Services and former director-general of the Second Authority Broadcasting Company. He resigned in December 2014 in order to run.
12. Akram Hasson, former Kadima party leader.
13. Asher Fentahun Seyoum

Economist and professor Manuel Trajtenberg was reportedly asked by Kahlon to join his list, but declined and chose to run with the Zionist Union alliance (the joint Labor and Hatnuah list) instead.

Orna Angel and Hapoel Be'er Sheva chair Alona Barkat were speculated to be possible candidates with Kahlon, but ultimately they did not appear on the list. Tsega Melaku, previously director of Israel Radio's Reshet Alef station, author and an active member of Israel's Ethiopian community, joined the party and was initially named to its candidate list. However, she was disqualified because she had not left her government position far enough in advance to meet the "cooling off" requirement.

== Politics and ideology ==
Kahlon is known for his support for egalitarian economics and for issues affecting the middle class, although he also maintains a strong working-class appeal. Born himself to an immigrant Libyan family of modest means, Kahlon's target base was lower-middle class Sephardic and Mizrahi Jews in the Tel Aviv metropolitan area. He has posited Kulanu as a centrist party and sought to appeal to both populist and socially liberal camps.

As communications minister, he earned popularity by taking on Israel's wireless cartel and forcing them to lower mobile phone prices by introducing new competitors, a move he hopes to replicate with the banking and real estate sectors. His political focus is on tackling poverty, income inequality and the housing crisis. His platform aims to break up both private and public monopolies as well as lower the high cost of living. Traditionally known for a hard line on security matters, Kahlon has in more recent times suggested support for territorial compromise for a two-state solution. He has said he is "a product of the Likud", but that his "worldview is center, slightly leaning to the right". Within Likud, he was known to be socially liberal. Ari Shavit wrote in January 2015 that Kulanu had the potential to be the true successor to the national liberalism of Ze'ev Jabotinsky and Menachem Begin. Kahlon has said his party represents the Likud of Begin which according to him was socially conscious, had moderate positions, and took a pragmatic approach to peace.

It was not clear with which political bloc his party would be naturally allied. Kahlon considers himself a long-standing member of both Israel's "national camp" and its "social camp". While at times, he has appeared to lean right on questions of national security, during a televised debate, he and Zehava Gal-On, chairwoman of the left-wing Meretz, agreed that due to their similar socio-economic outlook, they could sit in the same coalition. While campaigning in 2015, he would not say whether the party would endorse Benjamin Netanyahu or Isaac Herzog for prime minister, although he and his senior partners Gallant and Oren were said to have privately preferred or publicly hinted preference for Herzog. Kahlon's platform was vaguely centrist and he said he would join any government committed to social justice that would make him finance minister. Although he "flirted heavily" with Herzog's Zionist Union during the campaign, political observers assessed it may be awkward for the former Likud minister to crown the opposition without it having a sufficient lead over Likud, which polls incorrectly had suggested would happen.

=== Economic policy ===
Kulanu's economic platform emphasizes reducing social disparities. The party supports the following proposals:

- Housing
  - Facilitating the residential construction process and removing bureaucratic and infrastructure impediments so that 250,000 units can be built
  - Placing under a single authority all agencies involved in the housing sector
  - Breaking up the Israel Lands Authority and monopolies in the real estate industry
  - Rent control
- Banking and finance
  - Curbing profits in the banking sector, in part by encouraging the growth of the smaller banks and decoupling the link between banks and the credit card firms
  - Instituting an inheritance tax of 20% to 25% on assets of more than ₪10 million
- Other economic issues
  - Increased competition in the food industry, both among suppliers and at the retail level
  - Elimination of monopolistic control of offshore natural gas production by implementing the policy of the anti-trust commissioner
  - Increased competition and reforms to the Israel Electric Corporation and its workforce
  - Severance of the connection between the commissions that agents get and pension fund management fees in an effort to give salaried employees a choice of pension agents at their place of work

=== Foreign policy ===
Despite once being part of the Likud's right-wing flank, Kahlon's diplomatic platform is more moderate. Kahlon has said: "The real Likud knows how to make peace, to give up territory, and on the other hand is conservative and responsible." Kahlon also sees Palestinian actions against Israel at international agencies as inconsistent with those of a partner for peace, but he says Kulanu would support a diplomatic solution to the conflict.

The addition of Michael Oren to the party brought foreign policy credentials to the list, although Kulanu prioritizes reducing the cost of living and not the peace process. Oren supports freezing growth outside the major settlement blocs to keep the prospects of a two-state solution alive while making efforts to improve conditions in the West Bank. He criticized the Netanyahu government's January 2015 decision to issue construction tenders for commercial facilities in the West Bank, adding that it would not help Israel's ability to defend itself or amass international support. Although he has said there is currently no viable Palestinian negotiating partner since the sides cannot agree on terms, Oren believes that the status quo is nevertheless unsustainable and that efforts must be made to lay the groundwork for a final status agreement and a Palestinian state. Oren shares Netanyahu's position on Iran, but he opposed both Netanyahu's speech to the United States Congress on the issue, which he said should be canceled, and Netanyahu's criticism of the president's handling of the nuclear negotiations.

=== Other issues ===
Kulanu was in favor of the following:

- Civil marriage in Israel, including for same-sex couples
- Increased state funding for non-Orthodox Jewish denominations
- Partial operation of public transportation on Saturdays
- Decriminalization of marijuana

It was opposed to the following:

- The nation-state bill
- Attempts at reducing the power of the Supreme Court of Israel

== 20th Knesset ==
The party competed for the first time in the election for the 20th Knesset of Israel. It became the fifth-largest party, earning 315,202 votes, or 7.49% of the total votes cast. The party's showing earned it 10 mandates in the 120 member Knesset.

Kulanu was the only centrist party to join Netanyahu's fourth government. In coalition negotiations, it won control of the Finance Ministry, the Construction and Housing Ministry and the Environmental Protection Ministry; the directorships of the Israel Land Authority and the Planning Authority; and the chairmanship of the Knesset's Labor, Welfare and Health Committee. Kahlon also effectively blocked the advancement of two legislative proposals aimed at weakening the status of the Supreme Court. Despite its control of the Finance Ministry, analysts expected it to be very difficult for the narrow, 61-seat parliamentary majority to pass the economic initiatives championed by Kulanu.

In January 2016, The New York Times published an op-ed by MK Yoav Gallant in which he describes how important he believes it is for Jewish and Arab leaders to come together in promoting peace and equality in their shared country. As part of that effort, he and MK Ayman Odeh, leader of the Joint List alliance of Arab parties, together visited several Arab Israeli towns, noting: "Together, we examined first-hand the challenges facing Arab Israeli communities so that we could bring about solutions."

== Leaders ==
| Leader | Took office | Left office |
|---|---|---|
| Moshe Kahlon | 2014 | 2019 |

== Election results ==
| Election | Leader | Votes | % | Seats | +/– | Government |
|---|---|---|---|---|---|---|
| 2015 | Moshe Kahlon | 315,360 | 7.49 (#5) | 10 / 120 | | Coalition |
| April 2019 | Moshe Kahlon | 152,756 | 3.54 (#10) | 4 / 120 | ▼6 | Caretaker |
