= Eli Alaluf =

Israeli politician (1945–2026)

- אלי אלאלוף
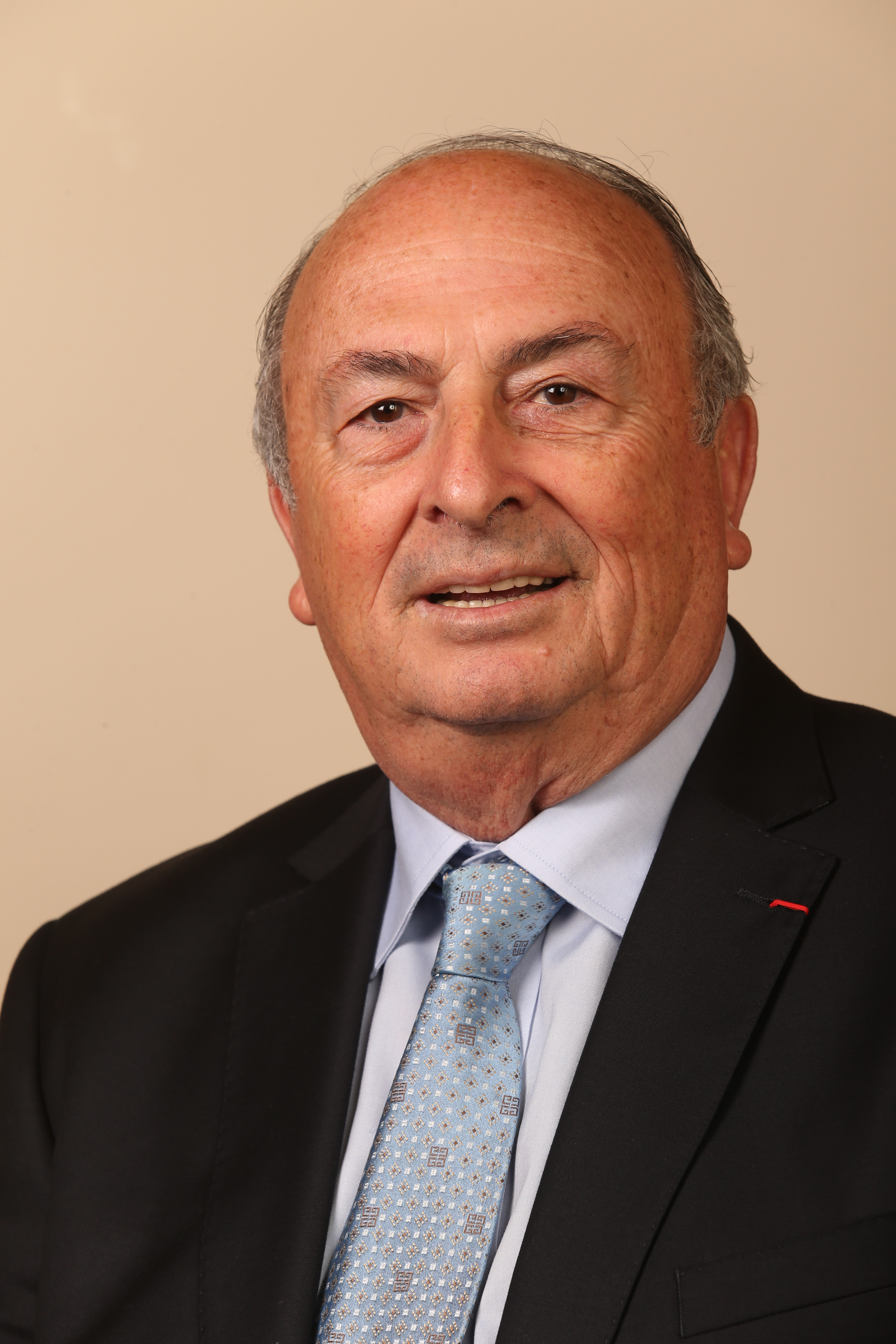

Faction represented in the Knesset
- 2015–2019: Kulanu

Personal details
- Born: 17 February 1945 Fes, French Morocco
- Died: 8 February 2026 (aged 80)

Eli Alaluf (Hebrew: אלי אלאלוף; 17 February 1945 – 8 February 2026) was an Israeli politician. Originally a senior bureaucrat for the Israeli government and Israeli NGOs, he later served as a member of the Knesset for Kulanu.

== Early life ==
Eli Alaluf was born in Morocco in 1945, and immigrated to Israel in 1967. He graduated from the Hebrew University of Jerusalem with a degree in political science.

== Career ==
Alaluf was appointed director of the French-speaking youth division of the World Zionist Organization while attending Hebrew University and held the position until 1978.

Alaluf was a shaliach for Keren Hayesod in Switzerland between 1992 and 1995. Upon his return to Israel, he was appointed director general of the Rashi Foundation, where he served until 2012. In 2013, he was appointed to head the Alaluf Committee to Fight Poverty. While on the committee Alaluf received a 4.8 million NIS retirement package from the Rashi Foundation.

=== Political career ===
From 1989 to 1992, Alaluf served on the city council of Beersheba.

In December 2014, Alaluf joined the new Kulanu party headed by Moshe Kahlon, and was originally placed sixth on the list for the 2015 elections. After Tsega Melaku's disqualification, he moved to the third slot. He did not seek reelection in the April 2019 election.

== Personal life ==
In 2006, Alaluf was honored as one of the torchbearers in the national Israeli Independence Day ceremony. In 2011, Alaluf was awarded the Israel Prize for lifetime achievement and special contribution to society in recognition of his work with the Rashi Foundation.

Alaluf died on 8 February 2026, at the age of 80.
