= Yachad (political party) =

Israeli political party

Yachad יַחַד
- Leader: Eli Yishai
- Founded: 15 December 2014
- Split from: Shas
- Ideology: Orthodox interests Religious conservatism Religious Zionism; Social conservatism National conservatism
- Political position: Right-wing to far-right
- Religion: Ultra-Orthodox Judaism, Orthodox Judaism (Chardal)
- Member parties: Otzma Yehudit (2015)
- Knesset: 0 / 120

Election symbol
- קץ (2015) זנ (2019)

Website
- www.elieyshay.com

Yachad (Hebrew: יַחַד, lit. 'Together') is a Religious Zionist and Hardal political party in Israel formed by former Shas member Eli Yishai. The party combines certain groups of ultra-Orthodox Jews with some religious Zionists.

== History ==
The party was established on 15 December 2014, following a rift between Shas leader Aryeh Deri and former Shas leader Eli Yishai. The two had quarreled greatly after the death of Rabbi Ovadia Yosef, the spiritual leader of Shas. Former Jewish Home member Yoni Chetboun, of the Chardal wing of religious Zionism, announced on 14 December 2014 that he would join the party.

Rabbi Meir Mazuz, the dean of the Kisse Rahamim yeshivah, is the party's spiritual leader.

The party's name was not settled until it submitted its list of candidates for the 2015 elections, with early suggestions being Maran and HaAm Itanu (The Nation is with Us).

On 29 January 2015, the party reached an agreement to run a joint list with the extreme right-wing Otzma Yehudit for the 2015 elections, although it was widely expected they would break up their alliance after the election. The electoral strategy to unite with the far right was criticized by Haredi activists who said the deceased Rabbi Ovadia Yosef would have never approved an alliance with Kahanists.

The party failed to reach the minimum 3.25% electoral threshold, and failed to send any representatives to the Knesset. In 2017, the party announced that they planned on contesting the next elections.

In February 2019, Israeli Prime Minister Benjamin Netanyahu encouraged Yachad to form a joint list with Otzma Yehudit, The Jewish Home, and Tkuma, with Yishai promised a cabinet position if the deal went ahead. As conditions for the deal, Tkuma leader Bezalel Smotrich insisted on Yachad uniting with Tkuma and Jewish Home once elected to the Knesset, and both Smotrich and Jewish Home leader Rafi Peretz insisted on Yachad's Rabbi Meir Mazuz publishing a letter in support of the alliance. Mazuz opposed staying united after the election, reportedly due to the presence of female candidates on the lists of these two parties. In addition, Yishai claimed Shas leader Aryeh Deri had threatened to veto a potential appointment of Yishai to the cabinet. As a consequence, Yishai announced Yachad would run alone. Netanyahu subsequently urged Mazuz to get Yishai to withdraw from the election.

On 27 March 2019, Eli Yishai announced the withdrawal of Yachad from the April 2019 elections, and endorsed United Torah Judaism (UTJ), in exchange for UTJ pushing for his appointment to a position dealing with Haredi housing in a future government. After the election, Yishai claimed that Netanyahu had engineered the alliance by promising him a ministerial post if UTJ won over 8 seats.

Yachad did not contest the September 2019 elections. Yishai subsequently opened talks to join with UTJ, in exchange for a ministerial appointment after the election. Yishai also claimed he could get Noam to drop out of the election, although Noam denied being approached. UTJ stated openness to the proposal, but said the party would need Netanyahu to sign off on it. However, Netanyahu later clarified that he would not offer Yishai a ministerial appointment, after which Yishai opened talks to offer his party's support to Otzma Yehudit.

The Jewish Home party initially reached out to Yachad prior to the 2020 Israeli legislative election, to negotiate an electoral alliance between the two parties, but the terms of the offer made by Yishai were ultimately rejected by Jewish Home.

== Ideology ==
Yachad is a right-wing to far-right party, which advocates for Israeli sovereignty over the West Bank, as well as the encouragement of settlement. The party has also asserted that ultra-Orthodox men who are not devoting themselves to full-time Torah study should be drafted into the military, as long as the military framework has adapted to their needs, or that they should perform national civilian service. The party also opposes the egalitarian prayer space at the Western Wall.

== Leaders ==
Leader	Took office	Left office
Eli Yishai	2014	Incumbent

== Election results ==
=== Knesset ===
Election	Leader	Votes	%	Seats	Status
2015	Eli Yishai (ran with Michael Ben-Ari)	125,158	2.97	0 / 120	Extraparliamentary
