= Meir Mazuz =

Israeli rabbi (1945–2025)

Meir Mazuz מאיר מאזוז
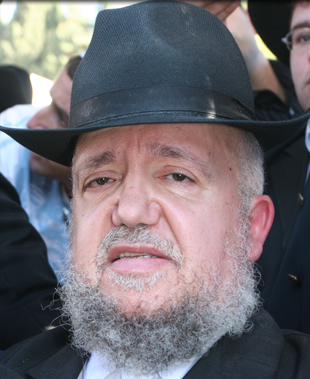
- Mazuz in 2009

Personal life
- Born: 27 March 1945 Tunis, French protectorate of Tunisia
- Died: 19 April 2025 (aged 80)
- Spouse: Esther Mazuz
- Parent: Matsliah Mazuz (father)

Religious life
- Religion: Judaism
- Denomination: Djerban/Tunisian

Meir Nissim Mazuz (also spelled Mazouz; Hebrew: מאיר מאזוז; 27 March 1945 – 19 April 2025) was a Sephardi-Tunisian Haredi rabbi in Israel, rosh yeshiva and a political leader.

Mazuz was the dean of the Kisse Rahamim yeshivah, and the son of rabbi Mazliah Mazuz of Tunis (1912–1971), who was assassinated. Meir Mazuz served as the spiritual leader of Yachad. He was the rabbinic leader (mara d'atra) of the Tunisian Jews.

== Background ==
Mazuz was born in Tunis, Tunisia to noted sage and scholar Rabbi Matsliah Mazuz, who was a judge in the high court of Tunisia and the dean of the original Kisse Rahamim yeshivah in Tunis, which he founded in 1963. Following the murder of Matsliah by an Arab nationalist in 1971, Meir and his brothers Tsemah and Rahamim fled to Israel, where they re-established their father's yeshiva in Bnei Brak.

The yeshiva became an elite institution that, apart from producing knowledgeable scholars, sought to make them into leading rabbis. It follows the traditional approach to learning done in Tunisia for centuries. The yeshiva later started its own press, the Rav Matsliah Institute (Mechon HaRav Matsliah) that prints the works of R. Matsliah Mazuz as well as other Jerban or Tunisian scholars, and prayer books and tikkunim based on the customs of Jerba. The yeshiva is connected to seven Talmud Torahs for Sephardic children throughout the country.

Mazuz died on 19 April 2025 after a long battle with illness and a deterioration in his health. He was 80. His funeral was attended by thousands. His brother Tsemah will succeed him as the dean of Kisse Rahamim.

== Views ==
Mazuz espoused a method of learning traditional to Tunisian Jews (though historically it was common to most Sephardic communities, originating from the influential Darkhe Ha-Talmud of R. Yitshak Campanton (1360–1463)) and was its principal exponent responsible for its dominant position among Sephardic approaches to learning.

Mazuz strongly encouraged the study of Hebrew grammar and of pronouncing the words in prayer and study with precision and clarity. He himself would speak in a highly traditional pronunciation even in his everyday speech. Part of the "Tunisian approach" he taught involves accounting for and understanding the purpose and meaning of every single word of the text being studied.

Mazuz was strongly homophobic, blaming COVID-19 and Meron disaster on homosexuality. Mazuz was also extremely arabophobic, he made comments in 2023 in support of Baruch Goldstein, the Jewish doctor who killed 29 Palestinian worshipers in Hebron in 1994, saying that the mass murder prevented a disaster because “the Arabs put axes, guns and knives under their prayer rugs. There was a big danger. The danger was averted thanks to that Jew.”

== Works ==
Mazuz authored dozens of works on various subjects. Some of these include:

- Commentary on R. Yehuda ha-Levi's piyyut Mi Kamocha;
- Shut Bayit Ne'eman (3 vols.), responsa;
- Bayit Ne'eman, comments on the books of Genesis, Exodus, and Leviticus, including notes on Targum Onkelos and the cantillation;
- Shut Makor Ne'eman, responsa;
- Arim Nissi, collection of hiddushim on various tractates studied in Kisse Rahamim;
- Lo Tashich, hiddushim on the fifth chapter of Bava Metzia, Ezehu Neshech;
- An additional collection of hiddushim on Tractate Kiddushin, published in Et haz-Zamir, 5783;
- Le-Ukme Girsa, notes on the order of prayers;
- Le-Ukme Girsa, glosses on Targum Onkelos;
- Sho'el Umeshiv, responsa intended on teaching how to write responsa, published in Ohr Torah, the journal of Kisse Rahamim;
- A collection of biographical articles on Tunisian Jewish sages;
- Kisse Ham-Melech, notes on Rambam, with commentary on his Mussar Epistle;
- Solet Nekiyya, laws of the Hebrew calendar.

In addition, there was a weekly publication named Bayit Ne'eman based on his popular lectures.
