= Kisse Rahamim yeshivah =

- Founded: 1962; 64 years ago
- Location: Bnei Brak, Israel
- Website: ykr.org.il (in Hebrew) kisserahamim.com (in French)

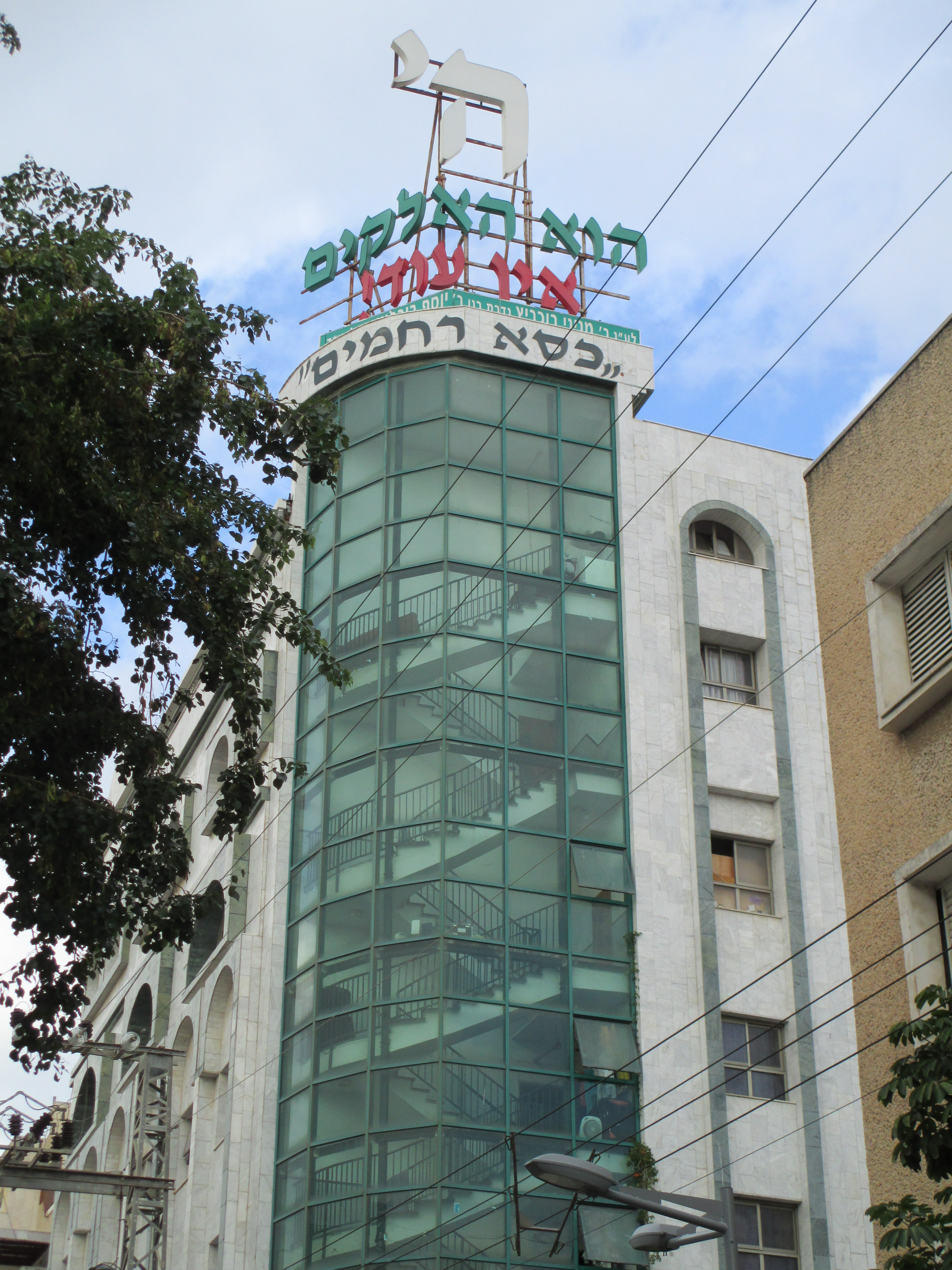
Kisse Rahamim yeshiva, Bnei Brak

Kisse Rahamim yeshivah is an Orthodox yeshivah in Bnei Brak, Israel, which perpetuates the traditions of the Tunisian Jews. It was founded in Tunis in 1962 and moved to Bnei Brak in 1971. Meir Mazuz, a leading Sephardic Rabbi in Israel, is the dean of the Kisse Rahamim yeshivah.

== History ==
The yeshiva was established in 1962 in Tunisia by Rabbi Matsliah Mazuz, who had previously served as a rabbi at the Chabad yeshiva there. He founded the yeshiva to preserve the traditional study method of Tunisian Jewry. The yeshiva is named after his teacher, Rabbi Rahamim Hai Huwita HaKohen.

Rabbi Matsliah Mazuz was assassinated by a Muslim attacker in January 1971. Following this, his family immigrated to Israel, and in July 1971, they announced the relocation of the yeshiva to Bnei Brak in a gathering held at the "Beit Rahamim" synagogue in the city. The head of the yeshiva in Israel is Rabbi Meir Mazuz Zt'l, the son of Rabbi Matsliah Mazuz.

Most of the yeshiva's students are of Tunisian descent, but students from other Sephardic communities also study there. The yeshiva's library is named "Ohel Moshe." In the "Maskil LeDavid" section, named after Rabbi David Idan, there is a large collection of books by scholars from Tunisia and Djerba. Some of these books contain handwritten glosses by Tunisian sages, as well as annotations by the yeshiva's head, Rabbi Meir Mazuz Zt'l.

Major donors to the yeshiva (directly or through companies they control) include the Amar family, owners of the radio station "Kol Berama," and the Shalom and Saban families, owners of "Radio Darom."

== Institutions ==
Since the 1980s, the Kisei Rachamim institutions have expanded and now include a mesivta, a yeshiva ketana and a yeshiva gedolah in Bnei Brak, as well as affiliated yeshivas in Elad, Emanuel, and Netivot. Additionally, Torah schools (eight branches, mostly in central and southern Israel), elementary schools for girls, and a high school for girls in Bnei Brak have been established.
