= Moshe Kahlon =

Israeli politician

- משה כחלון
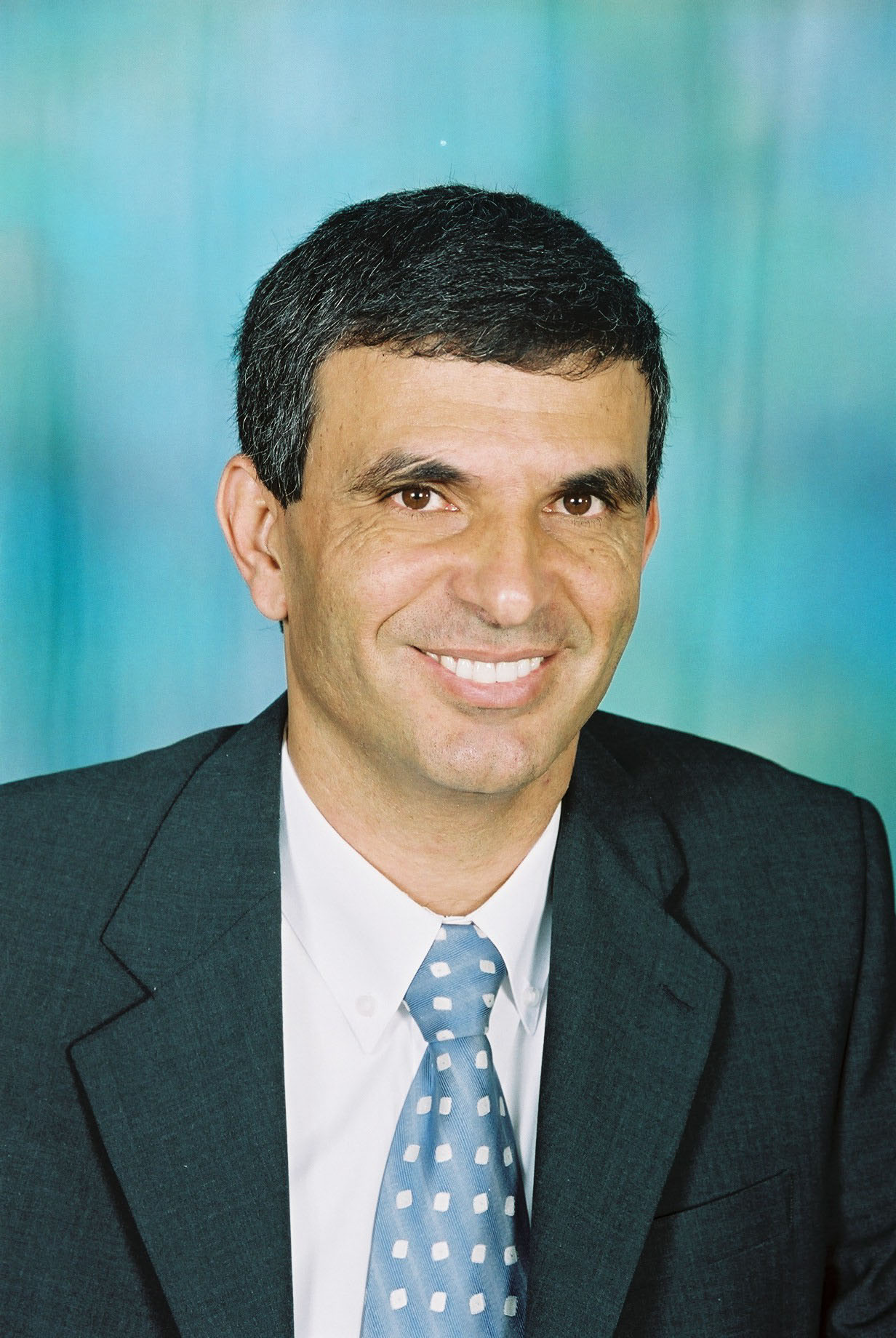

Ministerial roles
- 2009–2013: Minister of Communications
- 2011–2013: Minister of Welfare & Social Services
- 2015–2020: Minister of Finance
- 2016: Minister of Environmental Protection
- 2016–2017: Minister of Economy

Faction represented in the Knesset
- 2003–2013: Likud
- 2015–2019: Kulanu
- 2019–2020: Likud

Personal details
- Born: 19 November 1960 (age 65) Hadera, Israel

Moshe Kahlon (Hebrew: משה כחלון; born 19 November 1960) is a retired Israeli politician. Between 2003 and 2013 he served as a member of the Knesset on behalf of the Likud party, and as Minister of Communications and Minister of Welfare & Social Services. After a temporary hiatus from politics, he founded the Kulanu party in 2014, and returned to the Knesset the following year. In 2015, he was appointed Minister of Finance in the Netanyahu IV cabinet. On 12 January 2020, Kahlon announced that he would be retiring from politics.

He is known for championing socioeconomic issues like the eradication of poverty and income inequality.

== Early life ==
Moshe Kahlon was born in the Givat Olga neighborhood of Hadera. He was the fifth of seven children born to Libyan Jewish parents who had immigrated from Tripoli. His father worked in construction. He served in the Israel Defense Forces from 1978 to 1986, in the Ordnance Corps. After completing his army service he started a business of importing car appliances. He earned a BA in political science and general studies from the University of Haifa before going on to study law and gaining an LLB from the Netanya Academic College. In 2013, he attended the six-week advanced management program at Harvard University.

== Political career ==
Kahlon became politically active in the late 1980s, when he helped Rami Dotan campaign for mayor of Haifa. It was in the context of this election campaign that he met Uzi Landau, who appointed him his Bureau Chief when he became Minister of Public Security in 2001. Kahlon served in this position for a year. Kahlon was first elected to the Knesset in the 2003 elections, and was appointed Deputy Speaker of the Knesset. In the run up to the 2006 elections, he won third place on Likud's list in the party's primaries. He retained his seat again in the 2009 elections after being placed sixth on the Likud list, and was appointed Minister of Communications on 31 March.

In the Knesset, he worked to pass a bill to reduce electricity charges for poor families and headed an inquiry into bank fees. Kahlon was also credited with leading the "Cellular Revolution"; a set of policies that allowed new competitors to enter the cellular communications market in Israel, including Golan Telecom. This drastically reduced cellular communications prices in the Israeli market. On 19 January 2011, he was appointed Minister of Welfare & Social Services after the resignation of Isaac Herzog.

In December 2011, he was awarded the Knight of Quality Government by the Movement for Quality Government in Israel.

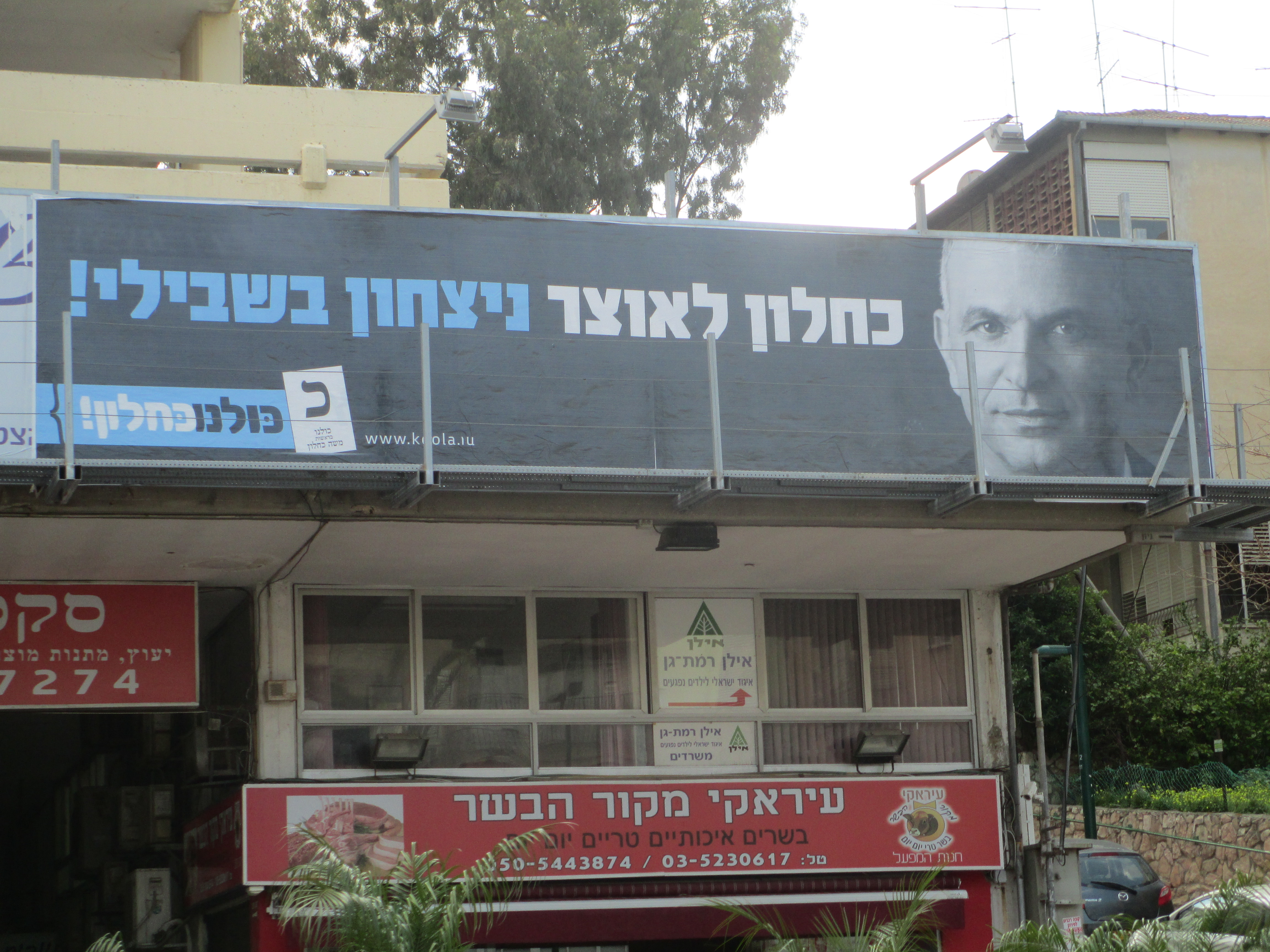
Kulanu election banner featuring Kahlon, 2015

Kahlon announced he would be taking a break from politics, and did not run in the 2013 Knesset elections. In response to reports that he was going to form a new political party, Kahlon announced on 3 November 2013 that he would not. It was subsequently reported that Kahlon would initiate a new party to run in the next Israeli legislative elections; possible running-mates were reported to include Yoav Gallant and Meir Dagan. In April 2014, after a period of silence, Kahlon announced in an interview with the newspaper Yedioth Ahronoth his intention to return to politics "imminently", but that he had not decided on a "framework" for his return. In the same interview, he strongly criticised the socio-economic and diplomatic policies of prime minister Benjamin Netanyahu, adding to speculation that he would attempt to run against Netanyahu in the future elections. In 2014, he indeed founded a new political party, the Kulanu party, ahead of the expected March 2015 elections. He announced several new members of his Knesset list: former ambassador to the US Michael Oren, Israel Prize winner Eli Alaluf, Yifat Sasha-Biton, a former deputy mayor of Kiryat Shmona and Deputy Jerusalem Mayor Rachel Azaria.

Kulanu subsequently won ten seats in the 2015 elections. The party joined Binyamin Netanyahu's coalition government, with Kahlon appointed Minister of Finance on 14 May 2015. He also briefly served as Minister of Environmental Protection from 31 May 2016 to 1 August 2016 and as Minister of the Economy from 1 August 2016 until 23 January 2017. He resigned from the Knesset on 29 January 2016 and was replaced by Akram Hasson, while retaining his ministerial portfolios under the Norwegian Law.

In the April 2019 Israeli legislative election, Kulanu won 4 seats, losing 6. The party merged with Likud on 28 May 2020, with Kahlon placing fifth on the party slate for the following election.

On 27 April 2020, a source close to Kahlon told Al-Monitor that Kahlon was speeding up his retirement and was planning to resign from Netanyahu's government before a new Israeli government was formed. However, he subsequently announced that he would not retire until a new government was formed. Kahlon officially left politics on 17 May 2020 when Israel Katz replaced him as Minister of Finance.

== Career after leaving Knesset ==
In November 2020, it was announced that Kahlon was to head a new investment fund founded with members of the House of Al Falahi in the wake of the Israel–United Arab Emirates normalization agreement.

In May 2021, following a mandatory cooling-off period required after his tenure as Minister of Finance, he was appointed chairman of Unet Credit, with an annual compensation of approximately NIS 8.3 million, the majority of which - NIS 6.1 million - was in equity-based payments. In June 2022, he resigned from this position after the company reported to the Tel Aviv Stock Exchange that “the company may have exposure arising from loans it had extended, which is significantly higher than previously reported.” According to Kahlon, the exposure stemmed from events that occurred prior to his joining the company.

In July 2022, he was questioned under caution by the Israel Securities Authority and released under restrictive conditions. On 17 December 2023, the Israel Securities Authority announced that, according to the findings of its investigation, Kahlon was suspected of reporting offenses, fraud, and breach of trust, and that the case had been transferred to the State Attorney’s Office.

The State Attorney’s Office decided to indict Kahlon, subject to a hearing, on charges of breach of trust in a corporation and failure to report in connection with this affair. In February 2026, it was reported that the prosecution had decided to file an indictment including violations of reporting obligations under the Securities Law. Subsequently, reports indicated that plea bargain negotiations were underway, which would not involve a finding of moral turpitude, enabling Kahlon to participate in the next elections. Kahlon was convicted in the case.

== Other activities ==
- Asian Infrastructure Investment Bank (AIIB), Ex-Officio Member of the Board of Governors (2015-2020)
- European Bank for Reconstruction and Development (EBRD), Ex-Officio Member of the Board of Governors (2015-2020)
- Inter-American Investment Corporation (IIC), Ex-Officio Member of the Board of Governors (2015-2020)

Party political offices
New office	Leader of Kulanu; 2014–2020	Incumbent
