= Eli Yishai =

Israeli politician

- אלי ישי
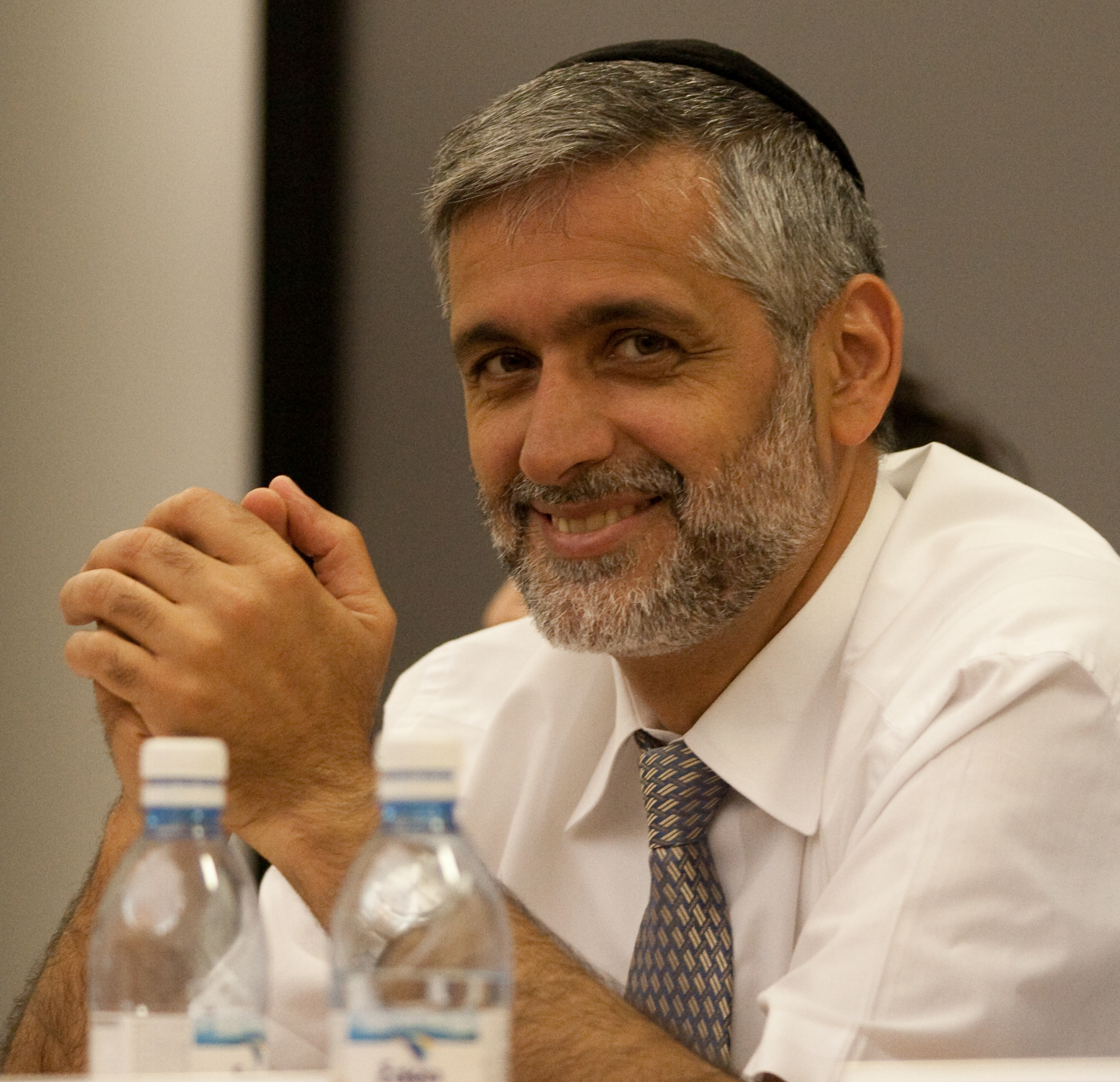
- Yishai in 2009

Ministerial roles
- 1996–2000: Minister of Labor & Social Welfare
- 2001–2002: Deputy Prime Minister
- 2001–2002: Minister of Internal Affairs
- 2002–2003: Deputy Prime Minister
- 2002–2003: Minister of Internal Affairs
- 2006–2013: Deputy Prime Minister
- 2006–2009: Minister of Industry, Trade & Labour
- 2009–2013: Minister of Internal Affairs

Faction represented in the Knesset
- 1996–2014: Shas
- 2014–2015: Yachad

Personal details
- Born: 26 December 1962 (age 63) Jerusalem, Israel

Eliyahu "Eli" Yishai (Hebrew: אליהו "אלי" ישי; born 26 December 1962) is an Israeli politician. A former leader of Shas, he represented the party in the Knesset from 1996 until 2015, also holding several ministerial posts, including being Deputy Prime Minister, Minister of Internal Affairs, and Minister of Industry, Trade, and Labor. In December 2014, he left Shas to establish the Yachad party.

== Personal life ==
Yishai was born in Jerusalem in 1962, to Zion (1933–2004) and Yvette-Fortuna Yishai (1934–2009), who had immigrated to Israel from Tunis in Tunisia. The second of seven children, he studied at the Porat Yosef Yeshiva in Jerusalem, and Yeshivat HaNegev in Netivot. In 1980, Yishai enlisted in the IDF and served until 1983.

Yishai is married, and has five children.

== Political career ==
=== Shas ===
In 1984, he entered political life. He became a member of Jerusalem City Council in 1987, although he left the council the following year. In 1988, Yishai served as an aide to Aryeh Deri who was then Minister of Internal Affairs. Although Yishai did not win a seat in the Knesset in the 1992 election, he was appointed the general secretary of Shas. He was first elected to the Knesset in the 1996 elections, after which he was made Minister of Labor and Social Welfare in Benjamin Netanyahu's government.

He retained his seat in the 1999 elections, and was again appointed Minister of Labor and Social Welfare in Ehud Barak's government. In 2000, Shas leader Deri was convicted of taking $155,000 in bribes while serving as Interior Minister and given a three-year jail sentence. Deri was replaced by Yishai as head of the party. Although Deri's sentence was only for three years, the court ruled that he be banned from entering politics for ten years. As leader of Shas, Yishai was seen as a political hawk and steered the party to the right of where it had been under Deri. Yishai tried to recruit voters from the settlements and took the party out of Ehud Barak's coalition government in advance of the Camp David summit with Yasser Arafat in 2000.

After Ariel Sharon defeated Barak in the 2001 elections for Prime Minister, Yishai was appointed Interior Minister and made a Deputy Prime Minister in Sharon's national unity government. However, Shas was not included in Ariel Sharon's coalition government formed after the 2003 elections.

Following the 2006 elections, Shas was invited to join Ehud Olmert's coalition, and Yishai was made Minister of Industry, Trade, and Labour, as well as Deputy Prime Minister. In the same year, he was subjected to criticism after he claimed that negative results from the 2006 Lebanon War were a consequence of soldiers not being as religiously observant as they were in the past. Yishai remained Deputy Prime Minister following the 2009 elections, and returned to the Internal Affairs portfolio.

In May 2009, he refused to allow the Holy See to exercise jurisdiction over Christian holy sites in Israel, an agreement which would have resolved disputes over the implementation of the 1993 Fundamental Accord. That November, Yishai argued that African refugee migrants to Israel should not be allowed to settle permanently in Israel because they bring in "a range of diseases such as hepatitis, measles, tuberculosis and AIDS." However, The Jerusalem Post reviewed Ministry of Health data, and concluded that there was a relatively low infection rate among asylum-seekers.

In a June 2012 interview with the Israeli daily Maariv, Yishai said: "Muslims that arrive here do not even believe that this country belongs to us, to the white man."

In November 2012, during Operation Pillar of Defense, he was quoted by Haaretz as saying: "The goal of the operation is to send Gaza back to the Middle Ages, only then will Israel be calm for the next 40 years."

In May 2013, some months after the internal rift following Deri's political comeback, Yishai was ousted as party leader, being replaced by Deri. Ovadia Yosef, the Sephardi sage and Shas spiritual leader, said regarding his decision to oust Yishai: "It was a deposit that he held, and now he can redeem it." Yosef also said he had told Deri at the time of his imprisonment that the position of party leader would be returned to him.

=== Yachad ===
In December 2014, Yishai announced that he would be leaving Shas to establish a new religious party, which would run in the 2015 elections. The announcement came after the friction between Deri and Yishai reached breaking point; Nine of Shas' eleven government ministers signed a statement indicating their support for Deri, and Shas' Council of Torah Sages ordered Deri to cancel a weekend meeting with Yishai during which the two planned to attempt a reconciliation.

The new party was named Yachad, and contested the 2015 elections in alliance with the far-right Otzma Yehudit party. However, it received only 2.97% of the vote, failing to cross the 3.25% electoral threshold, and did not win any seats.

Party political offices
Preceded by Position established	Leader of Yachad; 2014–present	Incumbent
