= Lobbying in the United States =

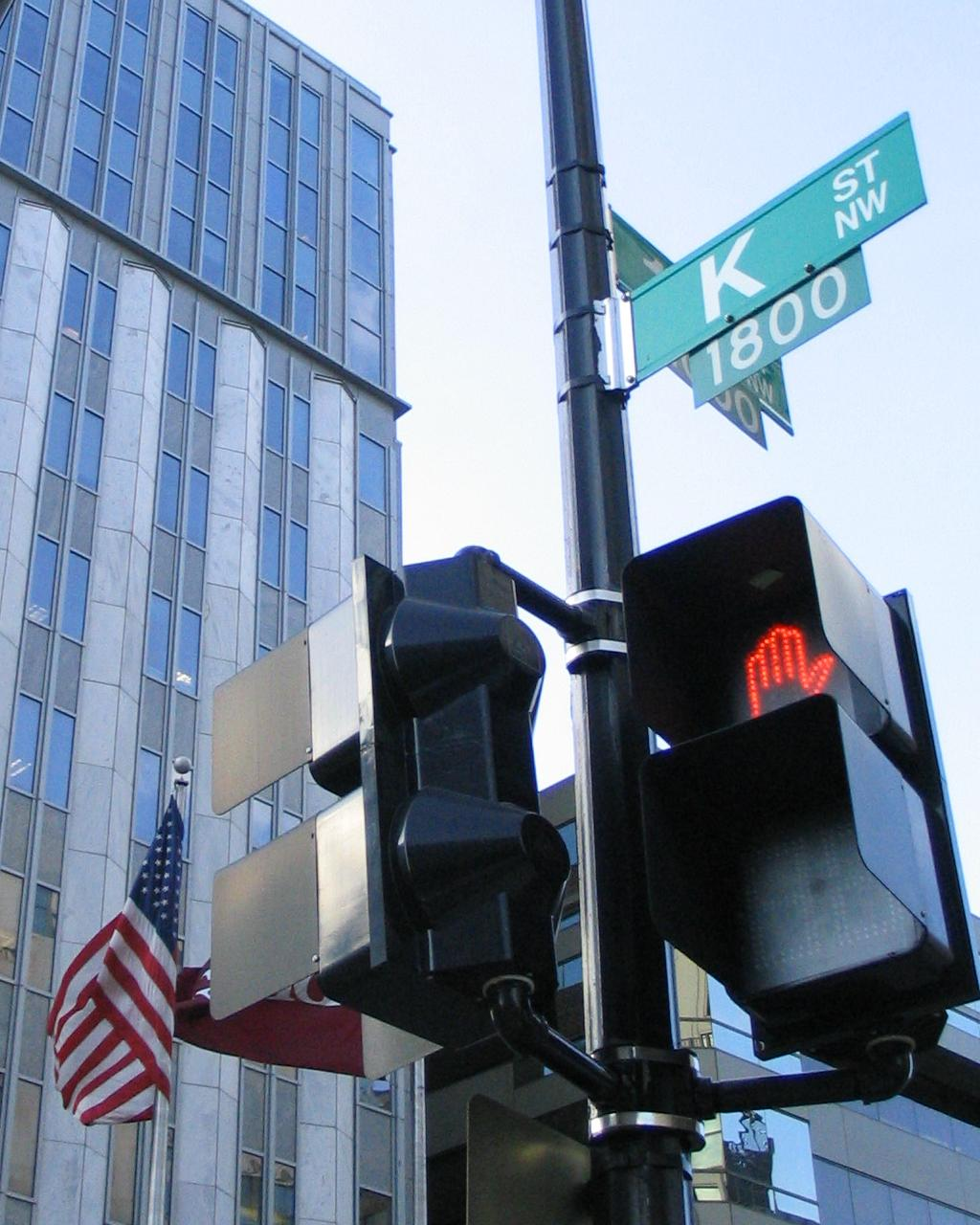
K Street in Washington, D.C., has become a metonym for the American lobbying industry.

Lobbying is a paid activity in which advocacy groups hire well-connected professional advocates, often lawyers, to argue for specific legislation in decision-making bodies such as the United States Congress. It is often perceived negatively by journalists and the American public; critics consider it to be a form of bribery, influence peddling, or extortion. Lobbying was illegal in the United States during the 18th and much of the 19th centuries. It is currently subject to complex rules which, if not followed, can lead to penalties including jail. Lobbying has been interpreted by court rulings as free speech protected by the First Amendment to the U.S. Constitution. Since the 1970s, the numbers of lobbyists and the size of lobbying budgets has grown and become the focus of criticism of American governance.

Lobbying takes place at every level of government: federal, state, county, municipal, and local governments. In Washington, D.C., lobbyists usually target members of Congress, although there have been efforts to influence executive agency officials as well as Supreme Court appointees. Lobbying can have a strong influence on the political system; for example, a study in 2014 suggested that special interest lobbying enhanced the power of elite groups and was a factor shifting the nation's political structure toward an oligarchy in which average citizens have "little or no independent influence".

The number of lobbyists in Washington is estimated to be over 12,000, but most lobbying (in terms of expenditures), is handled by fewer than 300 firms. A report in The Nation in 2014 suggested that while the number of registered lobbyists in 2013 (12,281) decreased compared to 2002, lobbying activity was increasing and "going underground" as lobbyists use "increasingly sophisticated strategies" to obscure their activity. Analyst James A. Thurber estimated that the actual number of working lobbyists was close to 100,000 and that the industry brings in $9 billion annually, mostly from corporations. Wall Street spent a record $2 billion trying to influence the 2016 United States elections.

== Overview ==
Political scientist Thomas R. Dye said that politics is about battling over scarce governmental resources: who gets them, where, when, why and how. Since government makes the rules in a complex economy such as the United States, various organizations, businesses, individuals, nonprofits, trade groups, religions, charities and others—which are affected by these rules—will exert as much influence as they can to have rulings favorable to their cause.

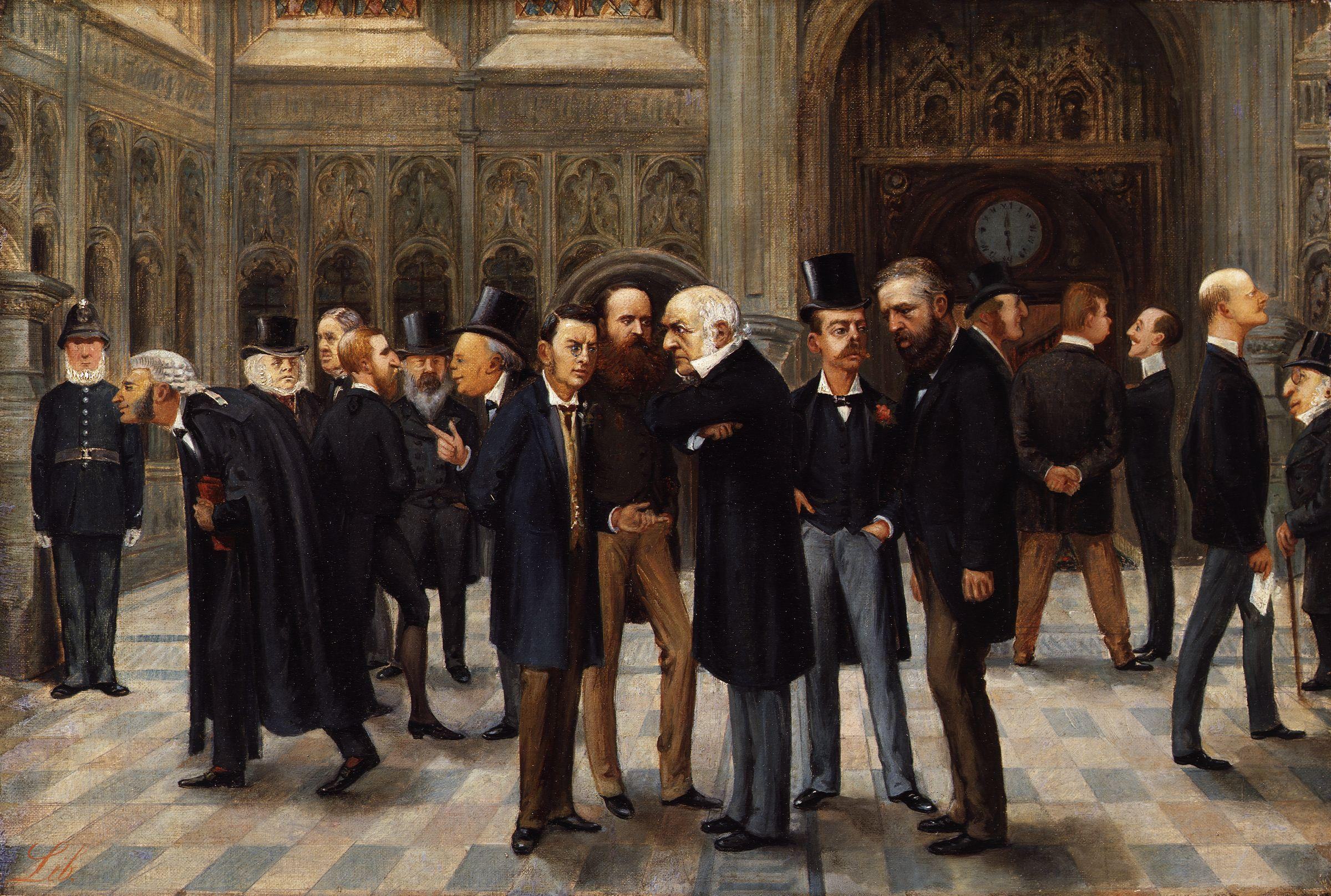
The lobby of the House of Commons. Painting 1886 by Liborio Prosperi.

The term lobby has etymological roots in the physical structure of the British Parliament, in which there was an intermediary covered room outside the main hall. People pushing an agenda would try to meet with members of Parliament in this room, and they came to be known, by metonymy, as lobbyists, although one account in 1890 suggested that the application of the word "lobby" is American and that the term is not used as much in Britain. The Willard Hotel, 2 blocks from the White House at 1401 Pennsylvania Avenue, claims the term originated there: "It was in the Willard lobby that Ulysses S. Grant popularized the term "lobbyist." Often bothered by self-promoters as he sat in the lobby and enjoyed his cigar and brandy, he referred to these individuals as "lobbyists."

The term lobbying suggests advocacy, advertising, or promoting a cause. A person who writes a letter to a congressperson, or even questions a candidate at a political meeting, could be construed as being a lobbyist.

The term "lobbying" generally means a paid activity with the purpose of attempting to "influence or sway" a public official – including bureaucrats and elected officials – towards a desired specific action often relating to specific legislation. If advocacy is disseminating information, then lobbying is when this activity becomes focused on specific legislation, either in support or in opposition.

Lobbyists are intermediaries between client organizations and lawmakers: they explain to legislators what their organizations want, and they explain to their clients what obstacles elected officials face. Some lobbyists work for advocacy groups, trade associations, companies, and state and local governments. A lobbyist may put together a diverse coalition of organizations and people, sometimes including lawmakers and corporations, and the whole effort may be considered to be a lobby; for example, in the abortion issue, there is a "pro-choice lobby" and a "pro-life lobby".

Most federal lobbyists are based in Washington, DC; an estimate from 2018 suggested that the count of registered lobbyists who actually lobbied that year was 11,656. The Washington D.C. lobbying industry is an exclusive one, with serious barriers to entry, since it requires them to have been "roaming the halls of Congress for years and years."

It is possible for foreign nations to influence the foreign policy of the United States through lobbying or by supporting lobbying organizations directly or indirectly.

== Different types of lobbying ==
=== The focus of lobbying efforts ===
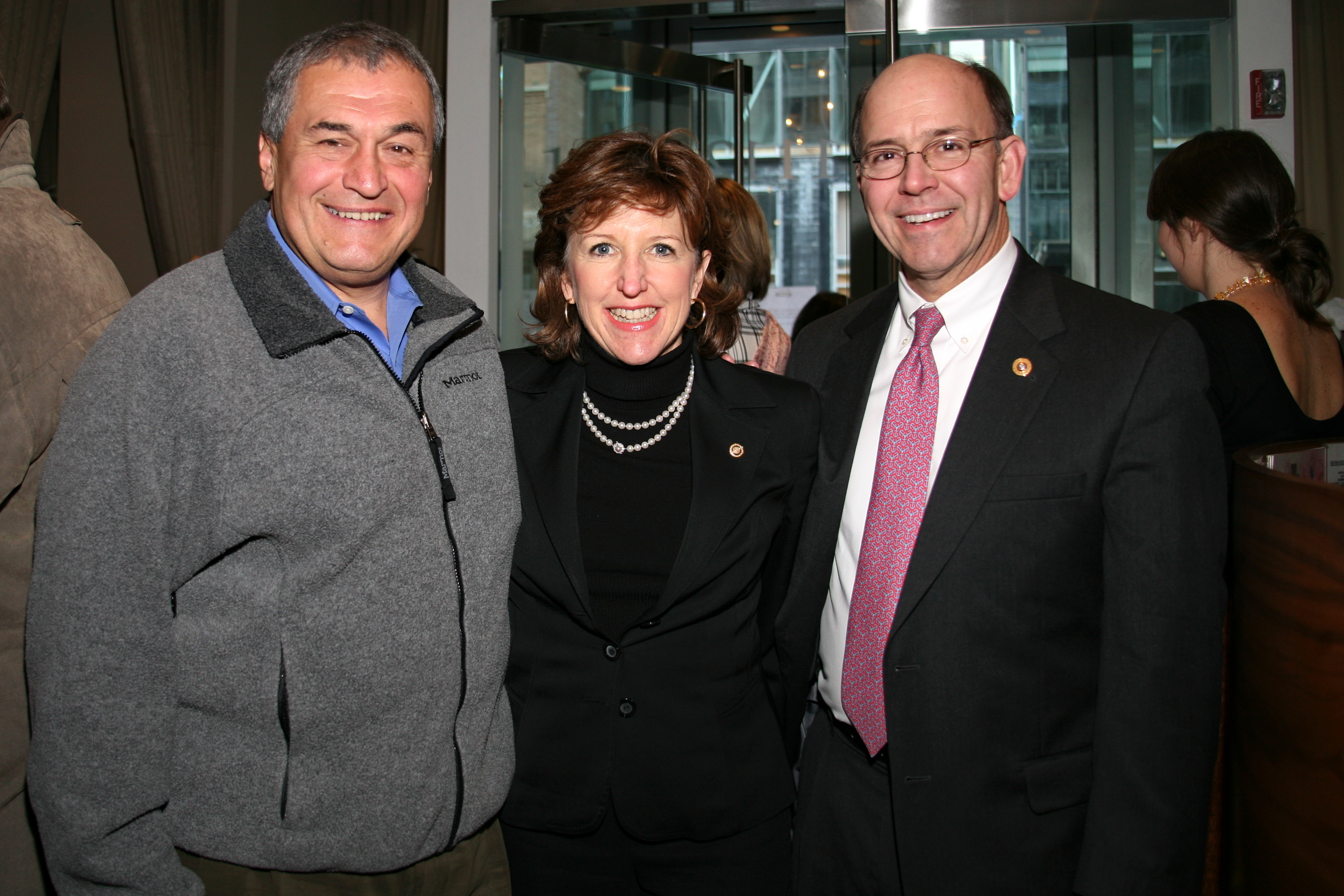
Lobbying depends on cultivating personal relationships over many years. Photo: Lobbyist Tony Podesta (left) with former Senator Kay Hagan (center) and her husband.

Generally, lobbyists focus on trying to persuade decision-makers: Congress, executive branch agencies such as the Treasury Department and the Securities and Exchange Commission, the Supreme Court, and state governments (including governors). Federal agencies are targeted by lobbyists because they write industry-specific rules; accordingly, interest groups spend "massive sums of money" trying to persuade them to make so-called "carve-outs" or try to block specific provisions from being enacted. A large fraction of overall lobbying is focused on only a few sets of issues, according to one report. It is possible for one level of government to lobby another level; for example, the District of Columbia has been lobbying Congress and the president for greater power, including possible statehood or voting representation in Congress; one assessment in 2011 suggested that the district needed to rethink its lobbying strategy, since its past efforts have only had "mixed results". Many executive branch agencies have the power to write specific rules and are a target of lobbying. Federal agencies such as the State Department make rules such as giving aid money to countries such as Egypt, and in one example, an Egyptian-American businessman named Kais Menoufy organized a lobby to try to halt U.S. aid to Egypt. In recent years there has been an increase in sanctions related lobbying, according to The Washington Post. In these lobbying efforts, foreign entities or governments lobby either to roll back sanctions that have been imposed on them by the U.S. government, or to impose sanctions on their rivals.

Lobbyists represent their clients' or organizations' interests in state capitols. An example is a former school superintendent who has been lobbying state legislatures in California, Michigan and Nevada to overhaul teacher evaluations, and trying to end the "Last In, First Out" teacher hiring process. State governments can be lobbied by groups which represent other governments within the state, such as a city authority; for example, the cities of Tallahassee and St. Petersburg lobbied the Florida legislature using paid lobbyists to represent the city's interests. There is lobbying activity at the county and municipal levels, especially in larger cities and populous counties. For example, some Chicago aldermen became lobbyists after serving in municipal government, following a one-year period required by city ethics rules to abstain from lobbying.

=== Paid versus free lobbying ===
While the bulk of lobbying happens by business and professional interests who hire paid professionals, some lobbyists represent non-profits pro-bono for issues in which they are personally interested. Pro bono publico clients offer activities to meet and socialize with local legislators at events like fundraisers and awards ceremonies.

=== Single issue versus multiple issue lobbying ===
Lobbies which push for a single issue have grown in importance during the past twenty years. Corporations generally would be considered as single issue lobbies. If a corporation wishes to change public policy, or to influence legislation which impacts its success as a business, it may use lobbying as a "primary avenue" for this purpose. Lobbies which represent groups such as labor unions, business organizations, and trade associations may be considered multiple issue lobbies, and be willing to accept compromise.

=== Inside versus outside lobbying ===
- Inside lobbying, or sometimes called direct lobbying, describes efforts by lobbyists to influence legislation or rule-making directly by contacting legislators and their assistants, sometimes called staffers or aides.
- Outside lobbying, sometimes called indirect lobbying or grassroots lobbying, includes attempts by interest group leaders to mobilize citizens outside the policymaking community, perhaps by public relations methods or advertising, to prompt them to pressure public officials within the policymaking community. One example of an outside lobbying effort is a film entitled InJustice, made by a group promoting lawsuit reform. Some lobbyists are now using social media to reduce the cost of traditional campaigns, and to more precisely target public officials with political messages.

=== Taxpayer-funded lobbying ===
Taxpayer-funded lobbying is when one taxpayer-funded entity lobbies another taxpayer-funded entity, usually for more taxpayer-funds. In the United States this typically takes place in the form of State-level agencies or municipalities devoting part of their budget to lobby the State government for a larger budget.

=== Three Pathways Lobbyist Influence ===
==== Transactional ====
Lobbyist provide money to public officials in exchange for political access and influence. This form of lobbying is used as a tactic for inside lobbying. The United States in known for using transactional.

==== Persuasion ====
Persuade public officials by providing information, which could lead to a change in officials stances on policy positions. This form of lobbying is used as a tactic for inside lobbying.

==== Mobilization ====
Lobbyist mobilize the public, interest group, stake holders, in order to increase the chance of achieving their goals. This form of lobbying is used as a tactic for outside lobbying. The EU is known for using mobilization.

== History of lobbying ==
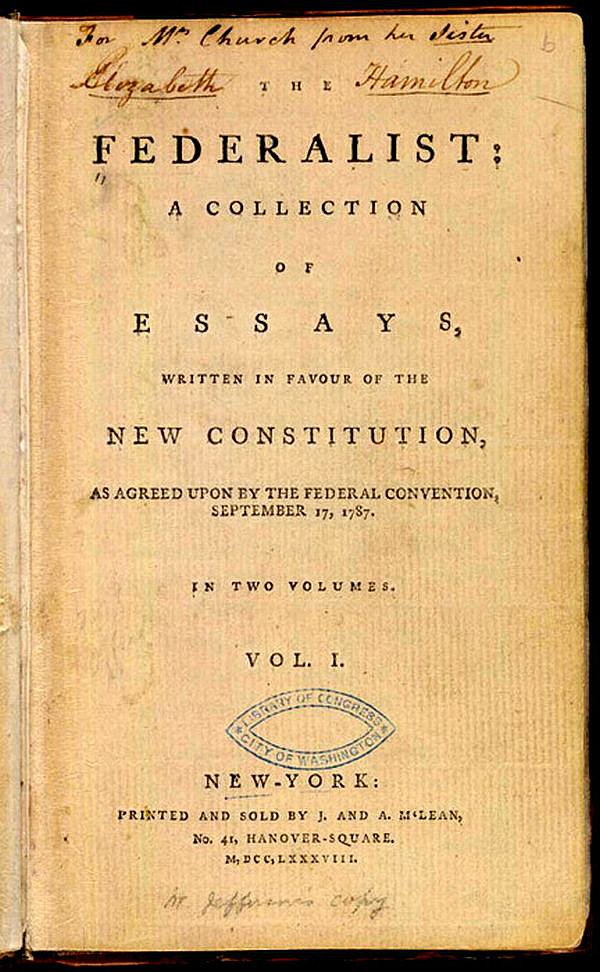
The Federalist Papers, in which Framers Madison, Hamilton and Jay strove to sway public opinion, could be considered according to current usage as an outside lobbying effort.

The Constitution was crafted in part to solve the problem of special interests, today usually represented by lobbies, by having these factions compete. James Madison identified a faction as "a number of citizens, whether amounting to a minority or majority of the whole, who are united and actuated by some common impulse of passion, or of interest, adverse to the rights of other citizens, or to the permanent and aggregate interests of the community", and Madison argued in Federalist No. 10 that there was less risk of injury by a narrowly focused faction in a large republic if any negative influence was counteracted by other factions. In addition, the Constitution protected free speech, including the right to petition the government, and these rights have been used by lobbying interests throughout the nation's history. There has been lobbying at every level of government, particularly in state governments during the nineteenth century, but increasingly directed towards the federal government in the twentieth century. The last few decades have been marked by an exponential increase in lobbying activity and expenditures.

== Lobbying as a business ==
=== Key players ===
==== Lobbyists ====
The number of registered Washington lobbyists is substantial. In 2009, The Washington Post estimated that there were 13,700 registered lobbyists, describing the nation's Capitol as "teeming with lobbyists.". In 2011, The Guardian estimated that in addition to the approximately 13,000 registered lobbyists, thousands more unregistered lobbyists could exist in Washington. The ratio of lobbyists employed by the healthcare industry, compared with every elected politician, was six to one, according to one account. Nevertheless, the numbers of lobbyists actively engaged in lobbying is considerably less, and the ones occupied with lobbying full-time and making significant money is even less.

- Law firms: Several law firms, including Patton Boggs, Akin Gump and Holland & Knight, had sizable departments devoted to so-called "government relations". One account suggested that the lobbying arms of these law firms were not held as separate subsidiaries, but that the law practices involved in government lobbying were integrated into the overall framework of the law firm. A benefit to an integrated arrangement was that the law firm and the lobbying department could "share and refer clients back and forth". Holland & Knight earned $13.9 million from lobbying revenue in 2011. One law firm employs so-called "power brokers" including former Treasury department officials such as Marti Thomas, and former presidential advisers such as Daniel Meyer. There was a report that two law firms were treating their lobbying groups as separate business units, and giving the non-lawyer lobbyists an equity stake in the firm.

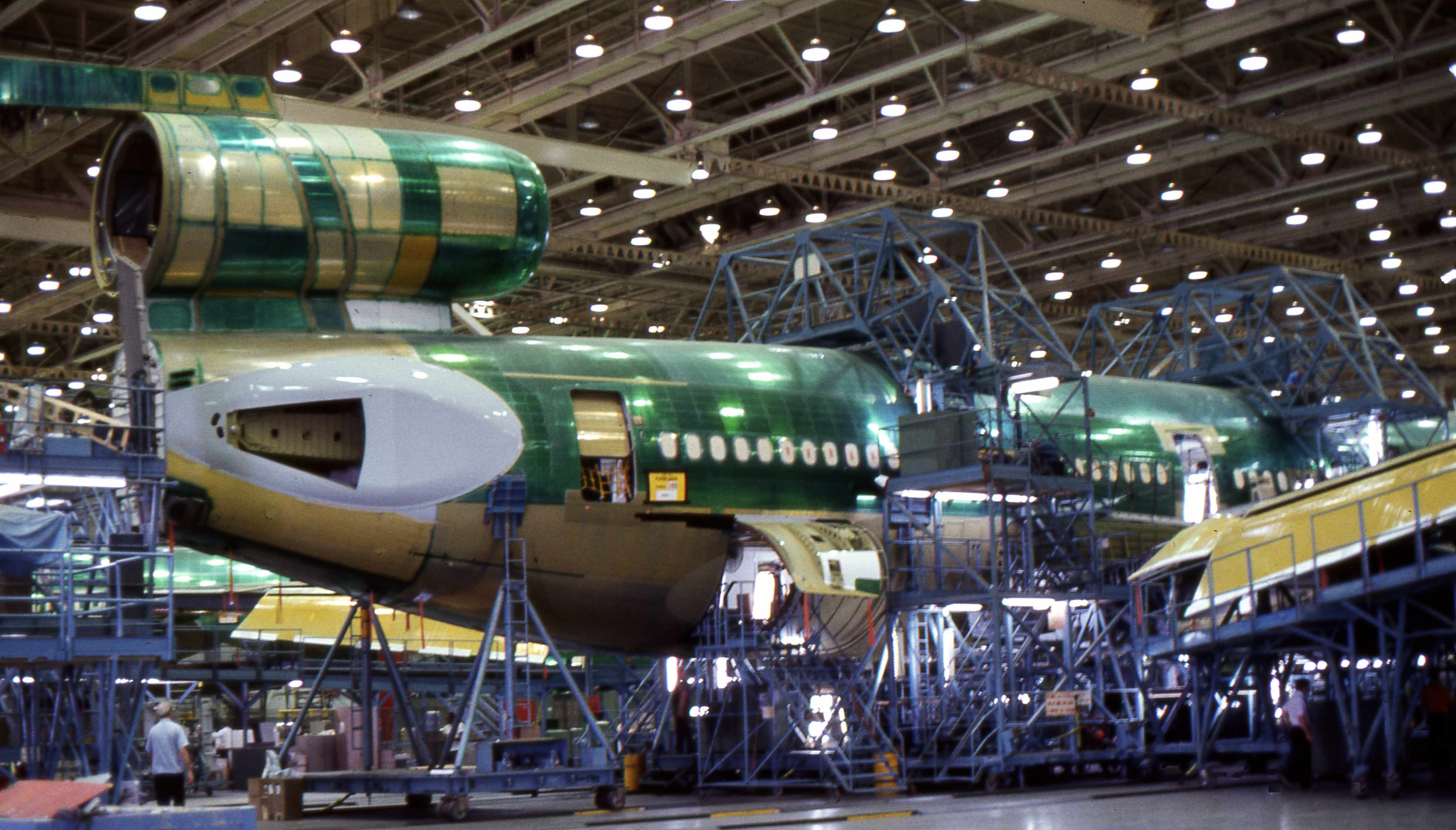
Defense contractors such as Boeing and Lockheed Martin sell extensively to the government and must, of necessity, engage in lobbying to win contracts.

==== Corporations ====
Corporations which lobby actively tend to be few in number, large, and often sell to the government. Most corporations do not hire lobbyists. One study found that the actual number of firms which do lobbying regularly is fewer than 300, and that the percent of firms engaged in lobbying was 10% from 1998 to 2006, and that they were "mainly large, rich firms getting in on the fun." These firms hired lobbyists year after year, and there was not much evidence of other large firms taking much interest in lobbying. Corporations considering lobbying run into substantial barriers to entry: corporations have to research the relevant laws about lobbying, hire lobbying firms, and cultivate influential people and make connections. When an issue regarding a change in immigration policy arose, large corporations currently lobbying switched focus somewhat to take account of the new regulatory world, but new corporations—even ones likely to be affected by any possible rulings on immigration—stayed out of the lobbying fray, according to the study.

Still, of all the entities doing lobbying in Washington, the biggest overall spenders are, in fact, corporations. In the first decade of the 2000s, the most lucrative clients for Gerald Cassidy's lobbying firm were corporations, displacing fees from the appropriations business. Wall Street lobbyists and the financial industry spent upwards of $100 million in one year to "court regulators and lawmakers", particularly since they were "finalizing new regulations for lending, trading and debit card fees." One academic analysis in 1987 found that firms were more likely to spend on lobbying if they were both large and concerned about "adverse financial statement consequences" if they did not lobby. Big banks were "prolific spenders" on lobbying; JPMorgan Chase has an in-house team of lobbyists who spent $3.3 million in 2010; the American Bankers Association spent $4.6 million on lobbying; an organization representing 100 of the nation's largest financial firms called the Financial Services Roundtable spent heavily as well. A trade group representing Hedge Funds spent more than $1 million in one quarter trying to influence the government about financial regulations, including an effort to try to change a rule that might demand greater disclosure requirements for funds. Amazon.com spent $450,000 in one quarter lobbying about a possible online sales tax as well as rules about data protection and privacy. Corporations which sell substantially to the government tend to be active lobbiers. For example, aircraft manufacturer Boeing, which has sizeable defense contracts, pours "millions into lobbying":

Boeing Co. is one of the most influential companies in airline manufacturing and has continually shown its influence in lobbying Congress ... Between January and September, Boeing spent a total of $12 million lobbying according to research by OpenSecrets. Additionally, Boeing has its own political action committee, which donated more than $2.2 million to federal candidates during the 2010 election cycle. Of that sum, 53 percent went to Democrats. ...Through September, Boeing's PAC has donated $748,000 to federal politicians.

— Chicago Sun-Times quoting OpenSecrets.org, 2011

Corporations have a positive correlation when it comes to spending on lobbying. Research has shown that there is a positive impact in market value equity when it comes to lobbying expenditures. Many corporation spend money on lobbying in hopes that it will lead to increased revenue, reduced costs, and lower risks, and hope to influence policies that will benefit their corporation. Some of the highest paying lobbyist are those who were previously employed by senators.

In the spring of 2017, there was a fierce lobbying effort by Internet service providers (ISPs) such as Comcast and AT&T, and tech firms such as Google and Facebook, to undo regulations protecting consumer privacy. Rules passed by the Obama administration in 2016 required ISPs to get "explicit consent" from consumers before gathering browsing histories, locations of businesses visited and applications used, but trade groups wanted to be able to sell this information for profit without consent. Lobbyists connected with Republican senator Jeff Flake and Republican representative Marsha Blackburn to sponsor legislation to dismantle Internet privacy rules; Flake received $22,700 in donations and Blackburn received $20,500 in donations from these trade groups. On March 23, 2017, abolition of privacy restrictions passed on a narrow party-line vote, and the lobbying effort achieved its result. In 2017, credit reporting agency Equifax lobbied Congress extensively, spending $1.1 million in 2016 and $500,000 in 2017, seeking rules to limit damage from lawsuits and less regulatory oversight; in August 2017, Equifax's databases were breached and the confidential data of millions of Americans was stolen by hackers and identity thieves, potentially opening up the firm to numerous class action lawsuits.

Major American corporations spent $345 million lobbying for just three pro-immigration bills between 2006 and 2008. Internet service providers in the United States have spent more than $1.2 billion on lobbying since 1998, and 2018 was the biggest year so far with a total spend of more than $80 million.

From a review in 2020, major food and beverage corporations spent $38.2 million on lobbying to strengthen and maintain big food influence in Washington, D.C.

==== Unions ====
One report suggested the United Food & Commercial Workers International Union spent $80,000 lobbying the federal government on issues relating to "the tax code, food safety, immigration reform and other issues."

==== Other players ====
Other possible players in the lobbying arena are those who might influence legislation: House & Senate colleagues, public opinion in the district, the White House, party leaders, union leaders, and other influential persons and groups. Interest groups are often thought of as "nonparty organizations" which regularly try to change or influence government decision-making.

=== Lobbying methods and techniques ===
Lobbying has much in common with highly people-intensive businesses such as management consulting and public relations, but with a political and legal sensibility. Like lawmakers, many lobbyists are lawyers, and the persons they are trying to influence have the duty of writing laws. That the disciplines of law and lobbying are intertwined could be seen in the case of a Texas lawyer who had been seeking compensation for his unfairly imprisoned client; since his exonerated-prisoner client had trouble paying the legal expenses, the lawyer lobbied the Texas state legislature to raise the state's payment for unfairly imprisoned prisoners from $50,000 per year to $80,000 per year; it succeeded, making it possible for his newly freed client to pay the lawyer's fees.

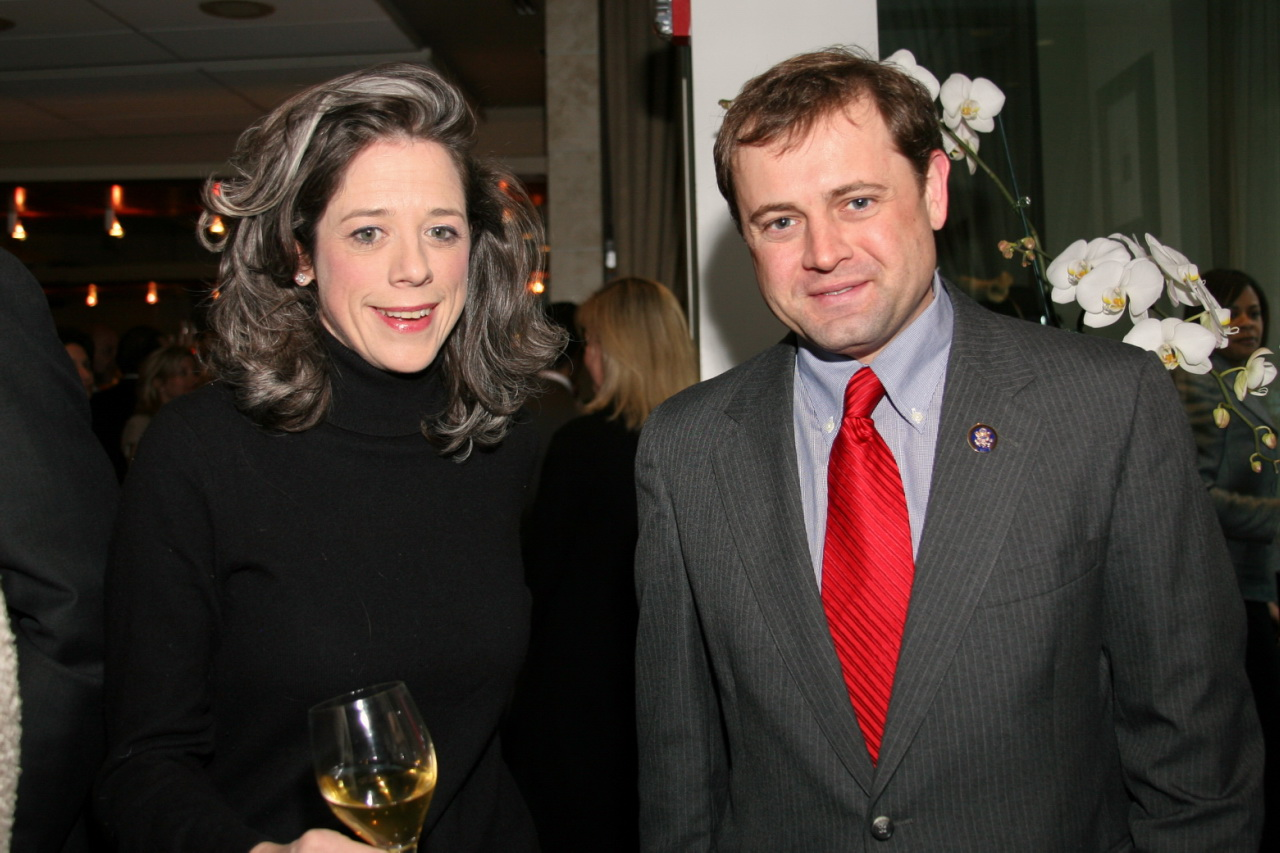
Connections count: Congressman Tom Perriello with lobbyist Heather Podesta at an inauguration party for Barack Obama.

Well-connected lobbyists work in Washington for years, know the issues, are highly skilled advocates, and have cultivated close connections with members of Congress, regulators, specialists, and others. They understand strategy and have excellent communication skills; Lobbyists patiently cultivate networks of powerful people, over many years, trying to build trust and maintain confidence and friendships. When a client hires them to push a specific issue or agenda, they usually form coalitions to exert political pressure. Lobbying, as a result, depends on trying to be flexible to new opportunities, but at the same time, to act as an agent for a client. As one lobbyist put it:

It's my job to advance the interests of my association or client. Period. — comment by a lobbyist

Access is important and often means a one-on-one meeting with a legislator. Getting access can sometimes be difficult, but there are various avenues: email, personal letters, phone calls, face-to-face meetings, meals, get-togethers, and even chasing after congresspersons in the Capitol building:

My style of lobbying is not to have big formal meetings, but to catch members on the fly as they're walking between the House and the office buildings. — a lobbyist commenting on access

When getting access is difficult, there are ways to wear down the walls surrounding a legislator. Jack Abramoff explained:

Access is vital in lobbying. If you can't get in your door, you can't make your case. Here we had a hostile senator, whose staff was hostile, and we had to get in. So that's the lobbyist safe-cracker method: throw fundraisers, raise money, and become a big donor. — Lobbyist Jack Abramoff in 2011

Lobbyists often assist congresspersons with campaign finance by arranging fundraisers, assembling PACs, and seeking donations from other clients. Many lobbyists become campaign treasurers and fundraisers for congresspersons. This helps incumbent members cope with the substantial amounts of time required to raise money for reelection bids; one estimate was that congresspersons had to spend a third of their working hours on fundraising activity. PACs are fairly easy to set up; it requires a lawyer and about $300, roughly. An even steeper possible reward which can be used in exchange for favors is the lure of a high-paying job as a lobbyist; according to Jack Abramoff, one of the best ways to "get what he wanted" was to offer a high-ranking congressional aide a high-paying job after they decided to leave public office. When such a promise of future employment was accepted, according to Abramoff, "we owned them". This helped the lobbying firm exert influence on that particular congressperson by going through the staff member or aide. At the same time, it is hard for outside observers to argue that a particular decision, such as hiring a former staffer into a lobbying position, was purely as a reward for some past political decision, since staffers often have valuable connections and policy experience needed by lobbying firms. Research economist Mirko Draca suggested that hiring a staffer was an ideal way for a lobbying firm to try to sway their old bosses—a congressperson—in the future.

In a one-on-one meeting with a lobbyist, it helps to understand precisely what goal is wanted. A lobbyist wants action on a bill; a legislator wants to be re-elected. The idea is to persuade a legislator that what the lobbyist wants is good public policy. Lobbyists often urge lawmakers to try to persuade other lawmakers to approve a bill.

Still, persuasion is a subtle business. In one instance of a public relations reversal, a lobbying initiative by the Cassidy firm which targeted Senator Robert C. Byrd blew up when the Cassidy-Byrd connection was published in The Washington Post; this resulted in a furious Byrd reversing his previous pro-Cassidy position and throwing a "theatrical temper tantrum" regarding an $18 million facility. Byrd denounced "lobbyists who collect exorbitant fees to create projects and have them earmarked in appropriation bills... for the benefit of their clients."

Since it often takes a long time to build the network of relationships within the lobbying industry, ethical interpersonal dealings are important. A maxim in the industry is for lobbyists to be truthful with people they are trying to persuade; one lobbyist described it this way: "what you've basically got is your word and reputation". An untruth, a lie is too risky to the successful development of a long-term relationship and the potential gain is not worth the risk. One report suggested that below-the-belt tactics generally do not work. One account suggest that groping for "personal dirt" on opponents was counterproductive since it would undermine respect for the lobbyist and their clients. And, by reverse logic, if an untruth is told by an opponent or opposing lobby, then it makes sense to publicize it. But the general code among lobbyists is that unsubstantiated claims are bad business. Even worse is planting an informant in an opponent's camp, since if this subterfuge is ever discovered, it will boomerang negatively in a hundred ways, and credibility will drop to zero. The importance of personal relationships in lobbying can be seen in the state of Illinois, in which father-son ties helped push a smart-grid energy bill, although there were accusations of favoritism. And there is anecdotal evidence that a business firm seeking to profitably influence legislation has to pay particular attention to which lobbyist it hires.

Strategic considerations for lobbyists, trying to influence legislation, include "locating a power base" or a constituency logically predisposed to support a given policy. Timing, as well, is usually important, in the sense of knowing when to propose a certain action and having a big-picture view of the possible sequence of desired actions. Strategic lobbying tries to estimate the possible responses of different groups to a possible lobby approach; one study suggested that the "expectations of opposition from other interests" was a key factor helping to determine how a lobby should operate.

Increasingly, lobbyists seek to put together coalitions and use outside lobbying by swaying public opinion. Bigger, more diverse and deep pocketed coalitions tend to be more effective in outside lobbying, and the "strength in numbers" principle often applies. Interest groups try to build "sustainable coalitions of similarly situated individual organizations in pursuit of like-minded goals". According to one study, it is often difficult for a lobbyist to influence a staff member in Congress directly, since staffers tend to be well-informed and subject to views from competing interests. As an indirect tactic, lobbyists can try to manipulate public opinion which, in turn, can sometimes exert pressure on congresspersons. Activities for these purposes include trying to use the mass media, cultivating contacts with reporters and editors, encouraging them to write editorials and cover stories to influence public opinion, which may have the secondary effect of influencing Congress. According to analyst Ken Kollman, it is easier to sway public opinion than a congressional staff member since it is possible to bombard the public with "half-truths, distortion, scare tactics, and misinformation." Kollman suggests there should be two goals: (1) communicate that there is public support behind an issue to policymakers and (2) increase public support for the issue among constituents. Kollman suggested outside lobbying was a "powerful tool" for interest group leaders. In a sense, using these criteria, one could consider James Madison as having engaged in outside lobbying, since after the Constitution was proposed, he wrote many of the 85 newspaper editorials arguing for people to support the Constitution, and these writings later became the Federalist Papers. As a result of this "lobbying" effort, the Constitution was ratified, although there were narrow margins of victory in four of the state legislatures. Lobbying today generally requires mounting a coordinated campaign, using targeted blitzes of telephone calls, letters, emails to congressional lawmakers, marches down the National Mall, bus caravans, and such, and these are often put together by lobbyists who coordinate a variety of interest group leaders to unite behind a hopefully simple easy-to-grasp and persuasive message.

It is important for lobbyists to follow rules governing lobbying behavior. These can be difficult and complex, take time to learn, require full disclosure, and mistakes can land a lobbyist in serious legal trouble.

Gifts for congresspersons and staffers can be problematic, since anything of sizeable value must be disclosed and generally such gifts are illegal. Failure to observe gift restrictions was one factor which caused lobbyist Jack Abramoff to eventually plead guilty to a "raft of federal corruption charges" and led to convictions for 20 lobbyists and public officials, including congressperson Bob Ney and Bush deputy interior secretary Stephen Griles. Generally gifts to congresspersons or their staffs or federal officials are not allowed, but with a few exceptions: books are permitted, provided that the inside cover is inscribed with the congressperson's name and the name of one's organization. Gifts under $5 are allowed. Another exception is awards, so it is permitted to give a congressperson a plaque thanking them for support on a given issue. Cash gifts payable by check can only be made to campaign committees, not to a candidate personally or to staff; it is not permitted to give cash or stock.

Wealthy lobbyists often encourage other lobbying clients to donate to a particular cause, in the hope that favors will be returned at a later date. Lobbyist Gerald Cassidy encouraged other clients to give for causes dear to a particular client engaged in a current lobbying effort. Some lobbyists give their own money: Cassidy reportedly donated a million dollars on one project, according to one report, which noted that Cassidy's firm received "many times that much in fees from their clients" paid in monthly retainers. And their clients, in turn, had received "hundreds of millions in earmarked appropriations" and benefits worth "hundreds of millions more".

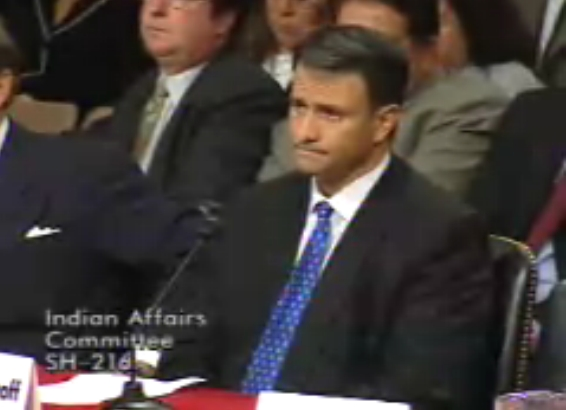
Jack Abramoff was at the center of an extensive corruption investigation.

The dynamics of the lobbying world make it fairly easy for a semi-skilled operator to defraud a client. This is essentially what happened in the Jack Abramoff Indian lobbying scandal. There was a concerned client—in this case, an Indian casino—worried about possible ill-effects of legislation on its gambling business; and there were lobbyists such as Jack Abramoff who knew how to exploit these fears. The lobbyists actively lobbied against their own casino-client as a way to ratchet up their fears of adverse legislation as well as stoke possible future contributions; the lobbyists committed other violations such as grossly overbilling their clients as well as violating rules about giving gifts to congresspersons. Numerous persons went to jail after the scandal. The following are factors which can make fraud a fairly easy-to-do activity: that lobbyists are paid only to try to influence decision-makers, and may or may not succeed, making it hard to tell if a lobbyist did actual work; that much of what happens regarding interpersonal relations is obscure despite rather strict disclosure and transparency requirements; that there are sizable monies involved—factors such as these almost guarantee that there will be future scandals involving fraudulent lobbying activity, according to one assessment. A fraud similar to Abramoff's was perpetrated in Maryland by lobbyist Gerard E. Evans, who was convicted of mail and wire fraud in 2000 in a case involving falsely creating a "fictitious legislative threat" against a client, and then billing the client to work against this supposed threat.

Lobbyists routinely monitor how congressional officials vote, sometimes checking the past voting records of congresspersons. One report suggested that reforms requiring "publicly recorded committee votes" led to more information about how congresspersons voted, but instead of becoming a valuable resource for the news media or voters, the information helped lobbyists monitor congressional voting patterns. As a general rule, lawmakers must vote as a particular interest group wishes them to vote, or risk losing support.

Strategy usually dictates targeting specific office holders. On the state level, one study suggested that much of the lobbying activity targeted the offices of governors as well as state-level executive bureaucrats; state lobbying was an "intensely personal game" with face-to-face contact being required for important decisions.

Lobbying can be a counteractive response to the lobbying efforts of others. One study suggested this was particularly true for battles surrounding possible decisions by the Supreme Court which is considered as a "battleground for public policy" in which differing groups try to "etch their policy preferences into law". Sometimes there are lobbying efforts to slow or derail other legislative processes; for example, when the FDA began considering a cheaper generic version of the costly anti-clotting drug Lovenox, the French pharmaceutical firm Sanofi "sprang into action to try and slow the process." Lobbyists are often assembled in anticipation of a potential takeover bid, particularly when there are large high-profile companies, or a large foreign company involved, and substantial concern that the takeover may be blocked by regulatory authorities.

An example may illustrate. The company Tyco had learned that there had been discussion about a possible new tax provision that might have cost it $4 billion overall. So the firm hired Jack Abramoff and paid him a retainer of $100,000 a month. He assembled dozens of lobbyists with connections to key congressional committees with the ultimate objective being to influence powerful Senator Charles Grassley. Abramoff began with a fundraising effort to round up "every check" possible. He sought funds from his other lobbying clients:

I had my clients understand that just as other clients who had nothing to do with them, would step up and give contributions to congressmen they needed to have some sway with, so similarly they needed to do the same. I went to every client I could, and rounded up every check we could for him.

— Lobbyist Jack Abramoff in 2011

=== Lobbyists as educators and advisors ===
"Government has grown so complex that it is a virtual certainty that more than one agency would be affected by any piece of legislation," according to one view. Lobbyists, therefore, spend considerable time learning the ins and outs of issues, and can use their expertise to educate lawmakers and help them cope with difficult issues. Lobbyists' knowledge has been considered to be an intellectual subsidy for lawmakers. Some lobbyists become specialists with expertise in a particular set of issues, although one study suggested that of two competing criteria for lobbyists—expertise or access—that access was far more important.

Lobby groups and their members sometimes also write legislation and whip bills, and in these instances, it is helpful to have lawyers skilled in writing legislation to assist with these efforts. Lobbyists may write the actual text of the proposed law, and hire lawyers to "get the language down pat"—an omission in wording or an unclear phrase may open up a loophole for opponents to wrangle over for years. Lobbyists can often advise a lawmaker on how to navigate the approval process.

Lobbying firms can serve as mentors and guides. For example, after months of protesting by the Occupy Wall Street, one lobbying firm prepared a memo to its clients warning that Republicans may "turn on big banks, at least in public" which may have the effect of "altering the political ground for years to come." Here are parts of the memo which were broadcast on the MSNBC network.

Leading Democratic party strategists have begun to openly discuss the benefits of embracing the growing and increasingly organized Occupy Wall Street (OWS) movement ... This would mean more than just short-term discomfort for Wall Street firms. If vilifying the leading companies of this sector is allowed to become an unchallenged centerpiece of a coordinated Democratic campaign, it has the potential to have very long-lasting political, policy and financial impacts on the companies in the center of the bullseye. ... the bigger concern should be that Republicans will no longer defend Wall Street companies...

— Clark, Lytle, Geduldig, Cranford, law/lobbying firm, to a Wall Street client

=== A growing billion dollar business ===
Top lobbying sectors 2025
| | Client | Amount Spent |
|---|---|---|
| 1 | Health | $867,539,940 |
| 2 | Finance/insur/RealEst | $711,251,433 |
| 3 | Communic/Electronics | $666,000,817 |
| 4 | Misc Business | $661,387,859 |
| 5 | Energy & Natural Resources | $485,324,539 |
| 6 | Other | $374,038,720 |
| 7 | Transportation | $369,918,339 |
| 8 | Ideological/Single-Issue | $238,907,628 |
| | Total | $4,374,369,275 |
| | Note: Amounts do not include campaign contributions. | |

Since the 1970s, there has been explosive growth in the lobbying industry, particularly in Washington D.C. By 2011, one estimate of overall lobbying spending nationally was $30+ billion dollars. An estimate of lobbying expenses in the federal arena was $3.5 billion in 2010, while it had been only $1.4 billion in 1998. And there is prodigious data since firms are required to disclose lobbying expenditures on a quarterly basis.

The industry, however, is not immune to economic downturns. If Congress is gridlocked, such as during the summer and early fall of 2011, lobbying activity dipped considerably, according to The Washington Post. Lobbying firm Patton Boggs reported drops in revenue during that year, from $12 million in 2010 to $11 million in 2011. To cope with the downturn, some law firms compensated by increasing activity in litigation, regulatory work, and representing clients in congressional investigations.

A sea-change in government, such as a shift in control of the legislature from one political party to the other, can affect the lobbying business profoundly. For example, the primarily Democratic-serving lobbying firm Cassidy & Associates learned that control of Congress would change hands from Democrats to Republicans in 1994, and the firm acquired Republican lobbyists before the congressional handover of power, and the move helped the lobbying firm stay on top of the new political realities.

=== Examples of lobbying ===
There are numerous examples of lobbying activity reported by the media. One report chronicled a somewhat unusual alliance of consumer advocates and industry groups to boost funding for the Food and Drug Administration; the general pattern of lobbying efforts had been to try to reduce the regulatory oversight of such an agency. In this case, however, lobbying groups wanted the federal watchdog agency to have tougher policing authority to avert expensive problems when oversight was lax; in this case, industry and consumer groups were in harmony, and lobbyists were able to persuade officials that higher FDA budgets were in the public interest. Religious consortiums, according to one report, have engaged in a $400 million lobbying effort on such issues as the relation between church and state, civil rights for religious minorities, bioethics issues including abortion and capital punishment and end-of-life issues, and family issues.

=== Lobbying as a career ===
While national-level lobbyists working in Washington have the highest salaries, many lobbyists operating at the state level can earn substantial salaries. The table shows the top lobbyists in one state—Maryland—in 2011.

Top Maryland lobbyists (2011)
| Lobbyist | Income |
|---|---|
| Gerard E. Evans | $1,232,000 |
| Timothy A. Perry | $1,217,793 |
| Joel D. Rozner | $1,215,161 |
| Robin F. Shaivitz | $1,156,368 |
| Gregory S. Proctor Jr. | $1,107,144 |
| John R. Stierhoff | $1,059,766 |
| Michael V. Johansen | $1,050,234 |
| Nicholas G. Manis | $1,016,250 |
| D. Robert Enten | $863,193 |
| Lisa Harris Jones | $857,000 |
| | Source: State Ethics; Commission |

Top power-brokers such as Gerald Cassidy have made fortunes from lobbying:

Cassidy's reaction to his own wealth has been complicated. He lives large, riding around town in his chauffeured car, spending thousands on custom-made clothes, investing big money in, for example, the Charlie Palmer Steak restaurant at the foot of Capitol Hill just for the fun of it. He has fashioned a wine cellar of more than 7,000 bottles. He loves to go to England and live like a gentleman of the kind his Irish antecedents would have considered an anathema.

— journalist Robert G. Kaiser in 2007 in The Washington Post

=== Effectiveness of lobbying ===
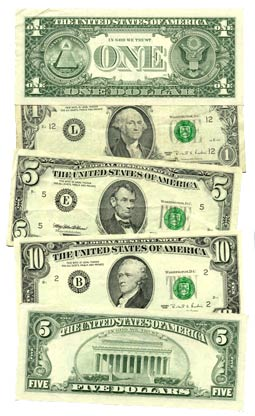
There is general agreement that money is a key variable in lobbying.

The consensus is that lobbying generally works overall in achieving sought-after results for clients, particularly since it has become so prevalent with substantial and growing budgets, although there are dissenting views. A study by the investment-research firm Strategas which was cited in The Economist and The Washington Post compared the 50 firms that spent the most on lobbying relative to their assets, and compared their financial performance against that of the S&P 500 in the stock market; the study concluded that spending on lobbying was a "spectacular investment" yielding "blistering" returns comparable to a high-flying hedge fund, even despite the financial downturn of the past few years. A 2009 study by University of Kansas professor Raquel Meyer Alexander suggested that lobbying brought a substantial return on investment. A 2011 meta-analysis of previous research findings found a positive correlation between corporate political activity and firm performance. There are numerous reports that the National Rifle Association or NRA successfully influenced 45 senators to block a proposed rule to regulate assault weapons, despite strong public support for gun control. The NRA spends heavily to influence gun policy; it gives $3 million annually to the re-election campaigns of congresspersons directly, and gives additional money to PACs and others to influence legislation indirectly, according to the BBC in 2016.

There is widespread agreement that a key ingredient in effective lobbying is money. This view is shared by players in the lobbying industry.

Deep pockets speak; the money trumps it all.

— Anonymous lobbyist, 2002

Still, effectiveness can vary depending on the situational context. One view is that large multiple-issue lobbies tend to be effective in getting results for their clients if they are sophisticated, managed by a legislative director familiar with the art of compromise, and play "political hardball". But if such lobbies became too big, such as large industrial trade organizations, they became harder to control, often leading to lackluster results. A study in 2001 which compared lobbying activity in US-style congressional against European-style parliamentary systems, found that in congressional systems there was an advantage favoring the "agenda-setters", but that in both systems, "lobbying has a marked effect on policies". One report suggested that the 1,000 registered lobbyists in California were highly influential such that they were called the Third House.

Studies of lobbying by academics in previous decades painted a picture of lobbying being an ineffectual activity, although many of these studies were done before lobbying became prevalent in American politics. A study in 1963 by Bauer, Pool, & Dexter suggested lobbyists were mostly "impotent" in exerting influence. Studies in the early 1990s suggested that lobbying exerted influence only "marginally", although it suggested that when lobbying activity did achieve political impacts, that the results of the political choices were sufficient to justify the expenditure on lobbying. A fairly recent study in 2009 is that Washington lobbies are "far less influential than political rhetoric suggests", and that most lobbying campaigns do not change any views and that there was a strong entrenchment of the status quo. But it depends on what is seen as "effective", since many lobbying battles result in a stalemate, since powerful interests battle, and in many cases, merely keeping the "status quo" could be seen as a victory of sorts. What happens often is that varying coalitions find themselves in "diametrical opposition to each other" and that stalemates result.

There is anecdotal evidence from numerous newspaper accounts of different groups battling that lobbying activity usually achieves results. For example, the Obama administration pledged to stop for-profit colleges from "luring students with false promises", but with this threat, the lobbying industry sprang into action with a $16 million campaign, and their efforts succeeded in watering down the proposed restrictions. How did the lobbying campaign succeed? Actions taken included:

1. spent $16 million
2. hired "all-star list" of prominent players including Democrats and Republicans with White House ties
3. plotted strategy
4. worked with "fund-raising bundler" Jamie Rubin, a former Obama communications director
5. won support from influential people including congressperson-turned-lobbyist Dick Gephardt, senator-turned-lobbyist John Breaux, lobbyist Tony Podesta, Washington Post CEO Donald E. Graham, education entrepreneur and University of Phoenix founder John Sperling, others
6. key leaders made "impassioned appeals"
7. mobilization effort produced 90,000 public documents to the Education department advocating against changes

And sometimes merely keeping the status quo could be seen as a victory. When gridlock led to the supposed supercommittee solution, numerous lobbyists from all parts of the political spectrum worked hard, and a stalemate resulted, but with each side defended their own special interests. And while money is an important variable, it is one among many variables, and there have been instances in which huge sums have been spent on lobbying only to have the result backfire. One report suggested that the communications firm AT&T failed to achieve substantial results from its lobbying efforts in 2011, since government antitrust officials rejected its plan to acquire rival T-Mobile.

Lobbying is a practical necessity for firms that "live and die" by government decisions, such as large government contractors such as Boeing. A study done in 2006 by Bloomberg News suggested that lobbying was a "sound money-making strategy" for the 20 largest federal contractors. The largest contractor, Lockheed Martin Corporation, received almost $40 billion in federal contracts in 2003–4, and spent $16 million on lobbying expenses and campaign donations. For each dollar of lobbying investment, the firm received $2,517 in revenues, according to the report. When the lobbying firm Cassidy & Associates began achieving results with earmarks for colleges and universities and medical centers, new lobbying firms rose to compete with them to win "earmarks of their own", a clear sign that the lobbying was exceedingly effective.

== Lobbying controversies ==
Lobbying has been the subject of much debate and discussion. There is general consensus that lobbying has been a significant corrupting influence in American politics, although criticism is not universal, and there have been arguments put forward to suggest that the system is working properly.

=== Unfavorable image ===
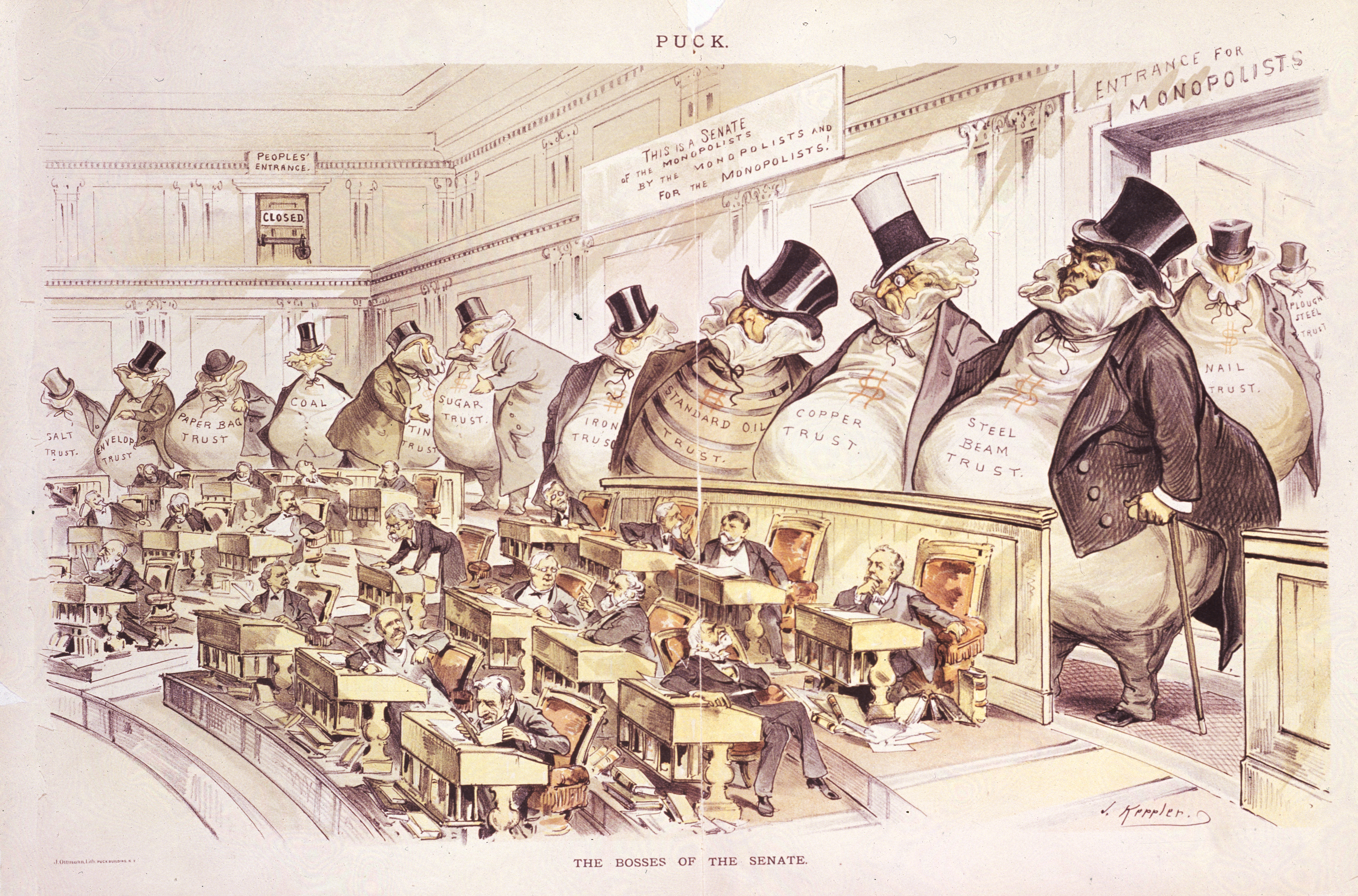
"The Bosses of the Senate", corporate interests as giant money bags looming over senators

Generally the image of lobbyists and lobbying in the public sphere is not a positive one, although this is not a universal sentiment. Lobbyists have been described as a "hired gun" without principles or positions. Scandals involving lobbying have helped taint the image of the profession, such as ones involving lobbyist Jack Abramoff, and congressmen Randy "Duke" Cunningham, and Bob Ney and others, and which featured words such as "bribery", "lobbyist", "member of Congress" and "prison" tending to appear together in the same articles. Negative publicity can sully lobbying's image to a great extent: high-profile cases of lobbying fraud such as Abramoff's; dubious father-son exchange-of-favors ties; public officials such as Newt Gingrich being accused and then denying accusations of having done lobbying and earning $1.6 million from "strategic advice". There are a variety of reasons why lobbying has acquired a negative image in public consciousness. While there is much disclosure, much of it happens in hard-to-disclose personal meetings, and the resulting secrecy and confidentiality can serve to lower lobbying's status.

=== Revolving door ===
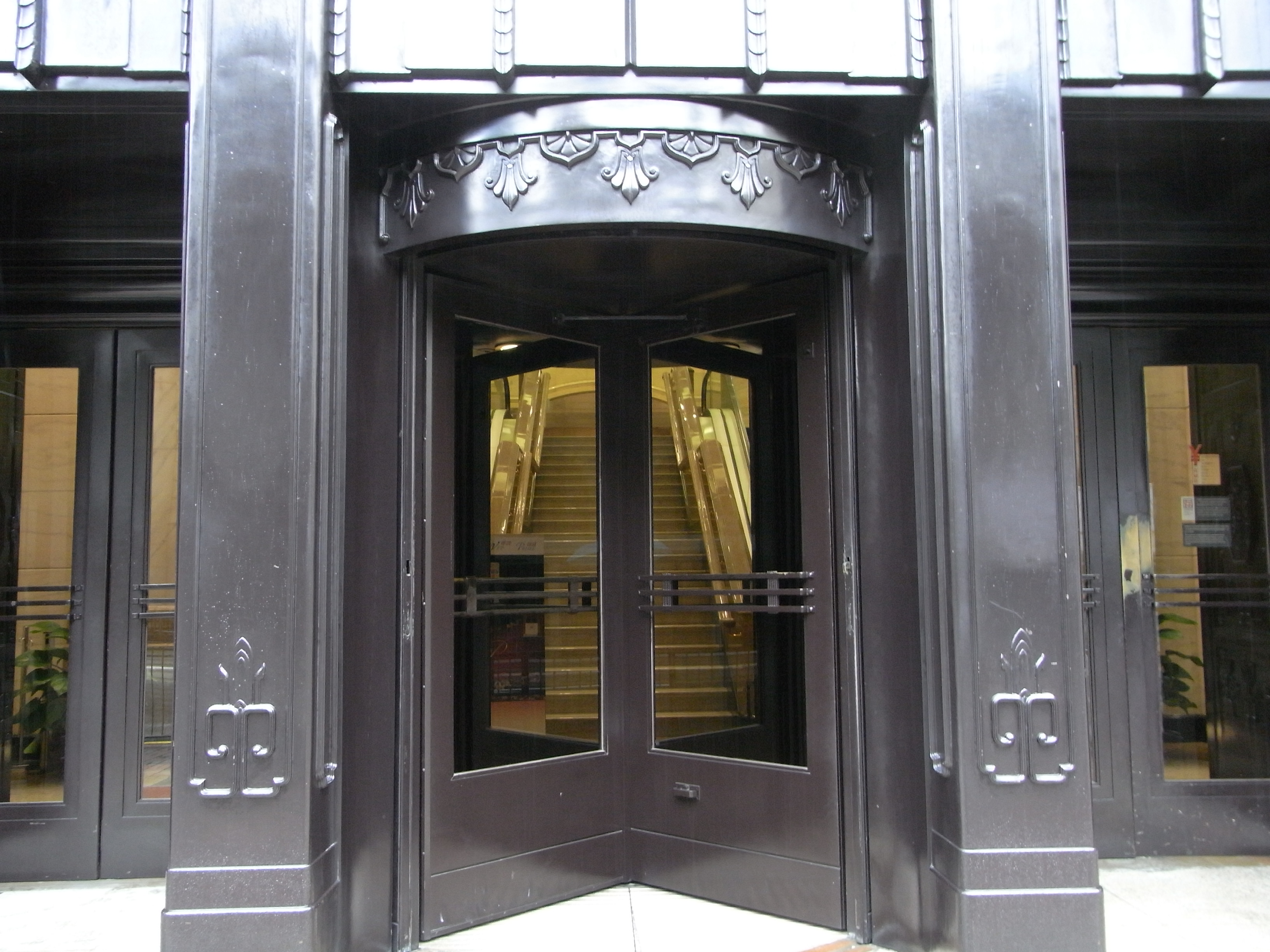
The image of a revolving door has been used to describe the relation between working in government and for lobbyists.

The "lucrative world of K Street" means that former congresspersons with even "modest seniority" can move into jobs paying $1 million or more annually, without including bonuses for bringing in new clients. The general concern of this revolving-door activity is that elected officials—persons who were supposed to represent the interests of citizens—have instead become entangled with the big-money interests of for-profit corporations and interest groups with narrow concerns, and that public officials have been taken over by private interests.

In July 2005, Public Citizen published a report entitled "The Journey from Congress to K Street": the report analyzed hundreds of lobbyist registration documents filed in compliance with the Lobbying Disclosure Act and the Foreign Agents Registration Act among other sources. It found that since 1998, 43 percent of the 198 members of Congress who left government to join private life have registered to lobby. A similar report from OpenSecrets found 370 former members were in the "influence-peddling business", with 285 officially registered as federal lobbyists, and 85 others who were described as providing "strategic advice" or "public relations" to corporate clients. The Washington Post described these results as reflecting the "sea change that has occurred in lawmakers' attitudes toward lobbying in recent years." The report included a case study of former U.S. Representative Bob Livingston, who resigned from congress in 1999 , after stepping down as Speaker-elect and later became a lobbyist. In the six years since his resignation, The Livingston Group grew into the 12th largest non-law lobbying firm, earning nearly $40 million by the end of 2004. During roughly the same time period, Livingston, his wife, and his two political action committees (PACs) contributed over $500,000 to the campaign funds of various candidates. The percentage of former members of Congress who become lobbyists has continued to increase.

=== Revolving Door Phenomenon ===
The Revolving Door Phenomenon refers to someone moving from a private sector to a public sector or from a public sector to a private sector. In 2019 a study showed that approximately 29% of former House of representative members become lobbyist and 34% of former Senators of Congress become lobbyist. Those in public sectors may favor corporations preferentially, in hopes of future employment with the corporation after finishing their tenure.

Numerous reports chronicle the revolving door phenomenon. A 2011 estimate suggested that nearly 5,400 former congressional staffers had become federal lobbyists over a ten-year period, and 400 lawmakers made a similar jump. It is a "symbiotic relationship" in the sense that lobbying firms can exploit the "experience and connections gleaned from working inside the legislative process", and lawmakers find a "ready pool of experienced talent." There is movement in the other direction as well: one report found that 605 former lobbyists had taken jobs working for lawmakers over a ten-year period. A study by the London School of Economics found 1,113 lobbyists who had formerly worked in lawmakers' offices. The lobbying option is a way for staffers and lawmakers to "cash in on their experience", according to one view. Before the 1980s, staffers and aides worked many years for congresspersons, sometimes decades, and tended to stay in their jobs; now, with the lure of higher-paying lobbying jobs, many would quit their posts after a few years at most to "go downtown."

And it is not just staffers, but lawmakers as well, including high-profile ones such as congressperson Richard Gephardt. He represented a "working-class" district in Missouri for many years but after leaving Congress, he became a lobbyist. In 2007, he began his own lobbying firm called "Gephardt Government Affairs Group" and in 2010 it was earning close to $7 million in revenues with clients including Goldman Sachs, Boeing, Visa Inc., Ameren Corporation, and Waste Management Inc. Senators Robert Bennett and Byron Dorgan became lobbyists too. Mississippi governor Haley Barbour became a lobbyist. In 2010, former representative Billy Tauzin earned $11 million running the drug industry's lobbying organization, called Pharmaceutical Research and Manufacturers of America (PhRMA). His bill to provide prescription drug access to Medicare recipients gave major concessions to the pharmaceutical industry: (1) Medicare was prevented from negotiating lower costs for prescription drugs (2) the reimportation of drugs from first world countries was not allowed (3) Medicare D was undermined by a policy of Medigap D. After the bill passed a few months later, Tauzin retired from Congress and took an executive position at PhRMA to earn an annual salary of $2 million. Many former representatives earned over $1 million in one year, including James Greenwood and Daniel Glickman.

=== Insider's game ===
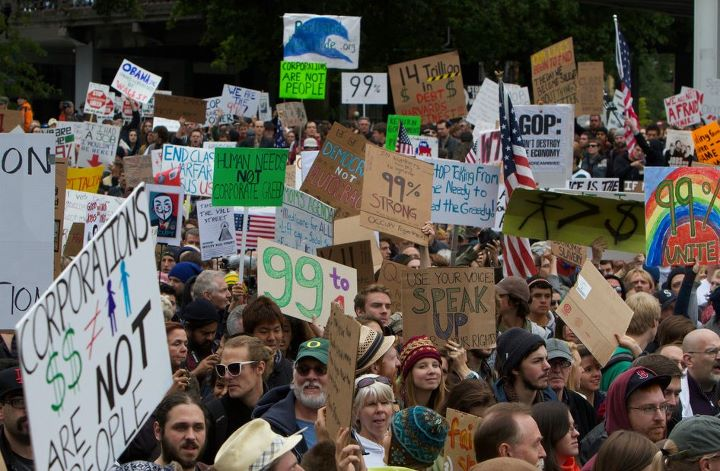
Occupy Wall Street protesters have been critical of lobbying in government.

A similar concern voiced by critics of lobbying is that Washington politics has become dominated by elites, and that it is an "insider's game" excluding regular citizens and which favors entrenched firms. Individuals generally can not afford to lobby, and critics question whether corporations with "deeper pockets" should have greater power than voters. In this view, the system favors the rich, such that the "rich have gotten richer, the weak weaker", admits lobbyist Gerald Cassidy. Those having more money and better political connections can exert more influence than others. There is so much money that it has been described as a "flood" that has a "corrupting influence", so that the United States appears to be "awash" in interest groups. If coalitions of different forces battle in the political arena for favorable treatment and better rules and tax breaks, it can be seen as fair if both sides have equal resources and try to fight for their interests as best they can. Gerald Cassidy said:

In a lot of areas, the stakes are between big companies, and it's hard to argue that one solution is better than another solution with regard to the consumer's interest ... The issue ... is whether Company A's solution, or Company B's solution, based on their technology or their footprint, is the right one.

— Lobbyist Gerald Cassidy

A related but slightly different criticism is that the problem with lobbying as it exists today is that it creates an "inequity of access to the decision-making process". As a result, important needs get left out of the political evaluation, such that there are no anti-hunger lobbies or lobbies seeking serious solutions to the problem of poverty. Nonprofit advocacy has been "conspicuously absent" from lobbying efforts, according to one view. Critics suggest that when a powerful coalition battles a less powerful one, or one which is poorly connected or underfunded, the result may be seen as unfair and potentially harmful for the entire society. The increasing number of former lawmakers becoming lobbyists has led Senator Russ Feingold (D-WI) to propose paring back the many Capitol Hill privileges enjoyed by former senators and representatives. His plan would deprive lawmakers-turned-lobbyists of privileges such as unfettered access to otherwise "members only" areas such as the House and Senate floors and the House gym.

=== Choice-making problems ===
A concern among many critics is that influence peddling hurts overall decision making. According to this criticism, proposals with merit are dropped in favor of proposals backed by political expediency. An example cited in the media is a 2011 battling between food industry lobbyists and healthcare lobbyists regarding school lunches. A group supported by the United States Department of Agriculture proposed healthier lunches as a way to combat childhood obesity by limiting the number of potatoes served, limiting salty foods, and adding more fresh vegetables, but this group was countered by a strong food lobby backed by Coca-Cola, Del Monte, and makers of frozen pizza. The food lobbyists succeeded in blocking the proposed reforms, even writing rules suggesting that the tomato paste on a pizza qualified as a vegetable, but overall, according to critics, this case appeared to be an example where business interests won out over health concerns. Critics use examples such as these to suggest that lobbying distorts sound governance. A study by IMF economists found that the "heaviest lobbying came from lenders making riskier loans and expanding their mortgage business most rapidly during the housing boom," and that there were indications that heavy-lobbying lenders were more likely to receive bailout funds. The study found a correlation between lobbying by financial institutions and excessive risk-taking during 2000–2007, and the authors concluded that "politically active lenders played a role in accumulation of risks and thus contributed to the financial crisis". Another study suggested that governments tend to protect domestic industries, and have a habit of shunting monies to ailing sectors; the study suggested that "it is not that government policy picks losers, it is that losers pick government policy." One critic suggested that the financial industry has successfully blocked attempts at regulation in the aftermath of the 2008 financial collapse.

=== Governmental focus ===
Critics have contended that when lawmakers are drawn into battles to determine issues such as the composition over school lunches or how much an ATM fee should be, more serious issues such as deficit reduction or global warming or social security are neglected. It leads to legislative inertia. The concern is that the preoccupation with what are seen as superficial issues prevents attention to long-term problems. Critics suggested that the 2011 Congress spent more time discussing per-transaction debit-card fees while neglecting issues seen as more pressing.

=== Methodological problems ===
In this line of reasoning, critics contend that lobbying, in and of itself, is not the sole problem, but only one aspect of a larger problem with American governance. Critics point to an interplay of factors: citizens being uninvolved politically; congresspersons needing huge sums of money for expensive television advertising campaigns; increased complexity in terms of technologies; congresspersons spending three days of every week raising money; and so forth. Given these temptations, lobbying came along as a logical response to meet the needs of congresspersons seeking campaign funds and staffers seeking personal enrichment. In a sense, in competitive politics, the common good gets lost:

I know what my client wants; no one knows what the common good is.

— Anonymous lobbyist

A lobbyist can identify a client's needs. But it is hard for a single individual to say what is best for the whole group. The intent of the Constitution's Framers was to have built-in constitutional protections to protect the common good, but according to these critics, these protections do not seem to be working well:

The structure of representative government, elected by the people, was to be our system's built-in protection of the whole of us—fairly elected officeholders were to represent their constituent groups, free from any obligations to special interests. Unfortunately, money has corrupted the system and compromised both the fairness of the electoral process as well as the independence and impartiality of elected officials.

— Barry Hessenius in Hardball Lobbying for Nonprofits, 2007

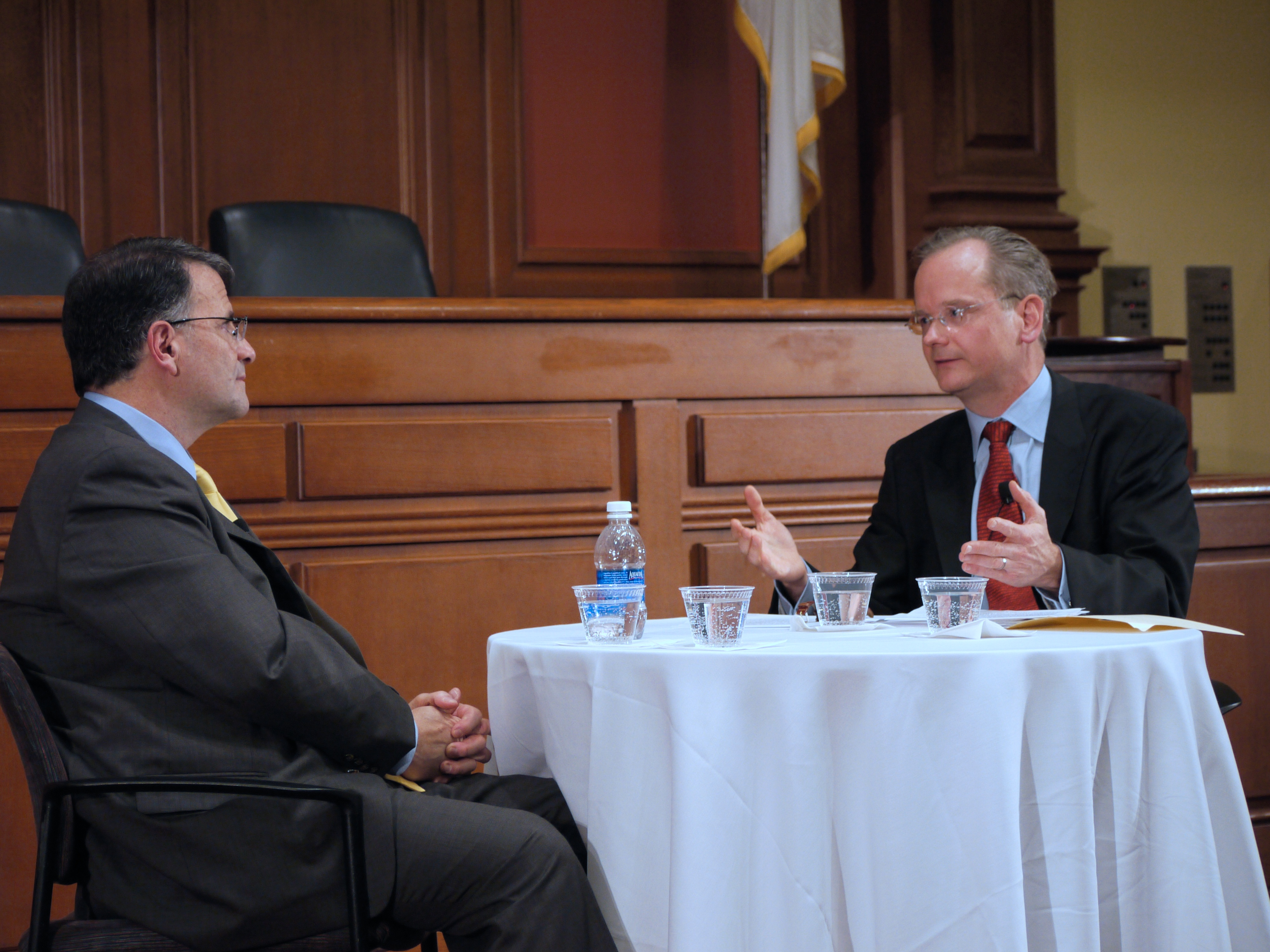
Former convicted lobbyist Jack Abramoff (left) listens to Harvard law professor Lawrence Lessig in 2011.

Lawrence Lessig, a professor at Harvard Law School and author of Republic, Lost, suggested that the moneyed persuasive power of special interests has insinuated itself between the people and the lawmakers. He quoted congressperson Jim Cooper who remarked that Congress had become a "Farm League for K Street" in the sense that congresspersons were focused on lucrative lobbying careers after Congress rather than on serving the public interest while in office. In a speech, Lessig suggested the structure of incentives was such that legislators were tempted to propose unnecessary regulations as a way to further lobbying industry activity. According to one view, major legislation such as proposed Wall Street reforms have spurred demand for "participating in the regulatory process." Lessig suggested the possibility that it was not corporations deciding to take up lobbying, but Congress choosing to debate less-than-important issues to bring well-heeled corporations into the political fray as lobbyists. As a result of his concerns, Lessig has called on state governments to summon a Second Constitutional Convention to propose substantive reform. Lessig believes that a constitutional amendment should be written to limit political contributions from non-citizens, including corporations, anonymous organizations, and foreign nationals.

Our current tax system with all its complexities is in part designed to make it easier for candidates, in particular congressmen, to raise money to get back to congress ... All sorts of special exceptions which expire after a limited period of time are just a reason to pick up the phone and call somebody and say 'Your exception is about to expire, here's a good reason for you to help us fight to get it to extend.' And that gives them the opportunity to practice what is really a type of extortion – shaking the trees of money in the private sector into their campaign coffers so that they can run for congress again.

— Lawrence Lessig, 2011

Scholars such as Richard Labunski, Sanford Levinson, Glenn Reynolds, Larry Sabato, as well as newspaper columnist William Safire, and activists such as John Booth of RestoringFreedom.org have called for constitutional changes that would curb the powerful role of money in politics.

=== Expansion of lobbying ===
Law in the United States is generally made by Congress, but as the federal government has expanded during much of the twentieth century, there are a sizeable number of federal agencies, generally under the control of the president. These agencies write often industry-specific rules and regulations regarding such things as automobile safety and air quality. Unlike elected congresspersons who are constantly seeking campaign funds, these appointed officials are harder to influence, generally. However, there are indications that lobbyists seek to expand their influence from the halls of Congress deeper into the federal bureaucracy.

President Obama pledged during the election campaign to rein in lobbying. As president in January 2009, he signed two executive orders and three presidential memoranda to help ensure his administration would be more open, transparent, and accountable. These documents attempted to bring increased accountability to federal spending and limit the influence of special interests, and included a lobbyist gift ban and a revolving door ban. In May 2009, the Recovery Act Lobbying Rules. The Executive Branch Reform Act, H.R. 985, was a bill which would have required over 8,000 Executive Branch officials to report into a public database nearly any "significant contact" from any "private party." The purpose was to identify lobbying activity. The bill was supported by proponents as an expansion of "government in the sunshine" including groups such as Public Citizen.

But the proposals ran into serious opposition from various groups including the lobbying industry itself. Opponents argued that the proposed reporting rules would have infringed on the right to petition, making it difficult not just for lobbyists, but for regular citizens to communicate their views on controversial issues without having their names and viewpoints entered into a government database. Opposition groups suggested that although the proposed rules were promoted as a way to regulate "lobbyists," persons described as a "private party" could be practically anybody, and that anybody contacting a federal official might be deemed to be a "lobbyist". The U.S. Department of Justice raised constitutional and other objections to the bill. Opponents mobilized over 450 groups including the U.S. Chamber of Commerce and National Association of Realtors with letter writing campaigns against the proposed restrictions. Lobbyist Howard Marlowe argued in a "stern letter" that the restriction on gift-giving to federal employees would create "fear of retribution for political donations":

Since your announcement to seek the Presidency you have consistently attacked the honorable profession of lobbying ... Lobbyists play an important role in the legislative process, serving as educators to elected officials. It is in the best interest to government to have informed individuals who serve as experts in every arena of public policy. Our ability to access and navigate the legislative process and push issues forward through a bureaucratic cluster is a vital service to the nation. The Draft Order would inhibit one of the most vital tools in the advocate's arsenal by creating fear of retribution for political donations. Making this kind of disclosure a part of the bidding process tarnishes a competition based on qualifications, adds an unneeded level of bureaucracy, and endangers the protection of free speech afforded to all Americans by the First Amendment of the Constitution...

— Howard Marlowe, president of the All American League of Lobbyists, in a letter to President Obama, May 31, 2011

In 2011, there were efforts to "shift regulatory power from the executive branch to Congress" by requiring that any "major rule" which may cost the economy more than $100 million must be decided by Congress with an up-or-down vote. But skeptics think that such a move proposed by Republican lawmakers could "usher in a lobbying bonanza from industry and other special-interest groups" to use campaign contributions to reshape the regulatory milieu.

=== Potential for reform ===
Critics suggest that Congress has the power to fix itself, but is reluctant to sacrifice money and power. One report suggested that those in control had an "unbroken record of finding ways to navigate around reform laws or turn regulatory standards to their own advantage."

=== Arguments for lobbying ===
According to the Madisonian view of politics—in which factions were supposed to compete with other factions—the system is working exactly as it should. Sometimes powerful financial interests lose the battle.

Since lobbyists often become highly knowledgeable about a specific issue by studying it in depth over years, they can bring considerable expertise to help legislators avoid errors as well as grasp the nuances of complex issues. It has been argued that lobbyists can help Congress by possibly raising "red flags" about proposed rulings.

Another argument in support of lobbying is that different interest groups and lobbyists, while trying to build coalitions and win support, often amend or soften or change their positions in this process, and that interest groups and lobbyists regulate each other, in a sense.

But a more general sentiment supporting the lobbying arrangement is that every citizen can be construed as being "represented" by dozens of special interests:

Every citizen is a special interest... Blacks, consumers, teachers, pro-choicers, gun control advocates, handicapped people, aliens, exporters, and salesmen – are all special interests... There is not an American today who is not represented (whether he or she knows it or not) by at least a dozen special interest groups. ... One person's special interest is another person's despotism...

— Donald E. deKieffer, author of The Citizen's Guide to Lobbying Congress, 2007

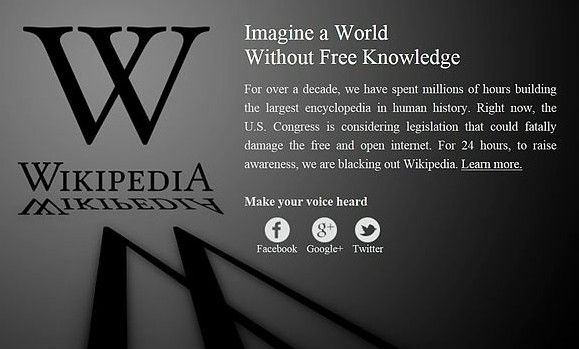
This is what users saw when they tried to access the English Wikipedia on January 18, 2012. It participated in a lobbying campaign by blacking out the encyclopedia for a day, and encouraged users to contact congresspersons to support positions it favored as part of an outside lobbying effort.

If powerful groups such as the oil industry succeed in winning a battle in government, consumers who drive gas-powered cars can benefit a bit, according to this view. Even readers of Wikipedia could be conceived as being a special interest and represented by various lobbies. For example, opponents of the Stop Online Piracy Act believed that the act might restrict sites such as Wikipedia; on January 18, 2012, as a form of protest and as a way to encourage readers and contributors of English Wikipedia to write their congresspersons, the online encyclopedia was "blacked out for a day as part of an effort to lobby the government.

Another view in support of lobbying is that it serves a helpful purpose as helping guard against extremism. According to this view, lobbying adds "built-in delays" and permits and encourages opposing lobbies to battle. In the battling, possibly damaging decrees and incorrect decisions are stymied by seemingly unhelpful delays and waits.

A slightly different view is that lobbying is no different from other professions:

Lobbying is no more perfect than is the practice of law or the practice of medicine.

— Lobbyist Gerald S. J. Cassidy, 2007

== The regulatory environment ==
=== Disclosure and domestic regulations ===
Generally, the United States requires systematic disclosure of lobbying, and it may be one of the few countries to have such extensive requirements. Disclosure in one sense allows lobbyists and public officials to justify their actions under the banner of openness and with full compliance of the law. The rules often specify how much a lobbyist can spend on specific activities, and how to report expenses; many of the laws and guidelines are specified in the Lobbying Disclosure Act of 1995. Transparency and disclosure requirements mean that there are volumes of statistics available for all kinds of analyses—by journalists, by the public, by rival lobbying efforts. Researchers can subdivide lobbying expenditures by numerous breakdowns, such as by contributions from energy companies.

Sometimes defining clearly who is a "lobbyist" and what precisely are lobbying activities can be difficult. According to the Lobbying Disclosure Act, several authorized definitions include:

- Lobbying activities means "lobbying contacts and efforts in support of such contacts, including preparation and planning activities, research and other background work that is intended, at the time it is performed, for use in contacts, and coordination with the lobbying activities of others."
- Lobbying contact means "any oral or written communication (including an electronic communication) to a covered executive branch official or a covered legislative branch official".

Still, distinguishing lobbyists from a strategic adviser can be difficult, since the duties of each can often overlap and are hard to define precisely. There have been issues raised about what constitutes the difference between a lobbyist and a bundler; one report described bundlers as "supporters who contribute their own money to his campaign and solicit it from others", and there was a question whether such persons were really lobbyists involved with raising campaign monies for the election of Barack Obama, and whether Obama had broken his own pledge not to receive money from lobbyists. The legal ramifications of lobbying are further intertangled with aspects of campaign finance reform, since lobbyists often spend time seeking donations for the reelection efforts of congresspersons; sorting out these issues can pose ethical challenges.

There are numerous regulations governing the practice of lobbying, often ones requiring transparency and disclosure. People paid to lobby must register with the secretary of the Senate and the clerk of the House of Representatives within 45 days of contacting a legislator for the first time, or 45 days after being employed. An exception is that lobbyists who earn less than $3,000 per client for each fiscal quarter, or whose total lobbying expenses are less than $11,500 each quarter, do not need to register. Part-time lobbyists are exempt from registering unless they spend more than 20% of their working hours doing lobbying activities in any quarter. If lobbyists have two or more contacts with a legislator as a lobbyist, then they must register. Generally, nonprofit organizations, other than churches, are exempt from registering if they hire an outside lobbying firm.

States are moving in the direction of greater disclosure and transparency regarding lobbying activities. California has an online database called Cal-Access although there were reports that it has been underfunded. Money collected from registration fees are often used to pay for the disclosure services such as Cal-Access. There were complaints in Illinois that the disclosure requirements were often not rigorous enough and allowed lobbyists to work "without public notice" and with possible "conflicts of interest". Many local municipalities are requiring legislative agents register as lobbyists to represent the interests of clients to local city council members such as in the swing state of Ohio cities such as Columbus and Cincinnati.

Laws requiring disclosure have been more prevalent in the twentieth century. In 1946, there was a so-called "sunshine law" requiring lobbyists to disclose what they were doing, on whose behalf, and how much they received in payment. The resulting Federal Regulation of Lobbying Act of 1946 governed lobbying rules up until 1995 when the Lobbying Disclosure Act replaced it. The Federal Election Campaign Act of 1971, later amended in 2002 as the McCain Feingold Act, had rules governing campaign contributions. Each branch of Congress has rules as well. Legislation generally requires reports containing an accounting of major expenditures as well as legislation that was influenced; the wording of some of the pertinent laws can be found in 2 U.S.C. ch. 26.

Lobbying law is a constantly evolving field; the American Bar Association published a book of guidelines in 2009 with over 800 pages. The laws are often rather specific, and when not observed, can lead to serious trouble. Failing to file a quarterly report, or knowingly filing an incorrect report, or failing to correct an incorrect report, can lead to fines up to $200,000 and imprisonment up to five years. Penalties can apply to lobbyists who fail to list gifts made to a legislator. In other situations, the punishment can be light: for example, Congressional aide-turned-lobbyist Fraser Verrusio spent a few hours in jail after pleading guilty to taking a client to a World Series baseball game and failing to report it. Tax rules can apply to lobbying. In one situation, the charity Hawaii Family Forum risked losing its tax-exempt status after it had engaged in lobbying activity; federal tax law requires charities such as that one to limit their lobbying to 20% of their overall expenditures or else be eligible for being taxed like a for-profit corporation.

Lobbyists sometimes support rules requiring greater transparency and disclosure:

Our profession is at a critical point where we can either embrace the constructive changes and reforms by Congress or we can seek out loopholes and continue the slippery slide into history along side the ranks of snake oil salesmen.

— Lobbyist Gerald S. J. Cassidy, 2007

Scandals can spur impetus towards greater regulation as well. The Jack Abramoff Indian lobbying scandal, which started in the 1990s and led to a guilty plea in 2006, inspired the Legislative Transparency and Accountability Act of 2006 (S. 2349). According to Time Magazine the Senate bill:

1. barred lobbyists themselves from buying gifts and meals for legislators, but left a loophole in which firms and organizations represented by those lobbyists could still dole out gifts and perks;
2. allowed privately funded trips if lawmakers got prior approval from a commissioned ethics committee;
3. required lobbyists to file frequent and detailed activity reports and have them posted publicly. The bill was approved in 2006 by a 90–8 vote.

In 1995, the 104th Congress tried to reform Lobbying by passing the Lobbying Disclosure Act of 1995 which defines and requires lobbyists who are compensated for their actions to register with congressional officials. The legislation was later amended by the Lobbying Disclosure Technical Amendments Act of 1998. There were subsequent modifications leading to the Honest Leadership and Open Government Act of 2007. The Lobbying Transparency and Accountability Act of 2006 (H.R. 4975) legislation modified Senate rules, although some senators and a coalition of good-government groups assailed the bill as being too weak. The Honest Leadership and Open Government Act of 2007 was a comprehensive ethics and lobbying reform bill, (H.R. 2316), which passed in 2007 in the House and Congress by a large majority. A parallel Senate version of the legislation, (S. 1), passed in 2007 by a nearly unanimous vote. After the House & Senate resolved their differences and passed an amended revision, President Bush signed the enrolled bill into law (Pub. L. 110–81 (text) (PDF)).

Some states have considered banning government employees permanently from lobbying on issues they had worked on. For example, there was a proposal along these lines to prevent county employees in Maryland from ever lobbying on issues they had worked on. The proposal insisted that county officials post financial disclosures as well as prohibit gifts from contractors.

Jack Abramoff, emerging from prison, has spoken publicly about lobbying. In his view, regulations designed to rein in the excesses of lobbying have not been effective, and reforms and regulations have not cleaned up the system "at all". Abramoff said lobbyists could "find a way around just about any reform Congress enacted", and gave an example:

You can't take a congressman to lunch for $25 and buy him a hamburger or a steak or something like that ... But you can take him to a fund-raising lunch and not only buy him that steak, but give him $25,000 extra and call it a fund-raiser – and have all the same access and all the same interactions with that congressman.

— Jack Abramoff, commenting on 60 Minutes, according to CNN

A similar view suggested that lobbying reform efforts have been "fought tooth and nail to prevent its passage" since the people with the power to reform would curtail their own powers and income flows.

=== Foreign lobbying ===
Since commerce worldwide is becoming more integrated, with firms headquartered in one country increasingly doing business in many other countries, it is logical to expect that lobbying efforts will reflect the increasing globalization. Sometimes foreign-owned corporations will want to lobby the United States government, and in such instances, new rules can apply, since it can be particularly thorny resolving whether national security interests are at stake and how they might be affected.

In 1938, the Foreign Agents Registration Act required an explicit listing of all political activities undertaken by a lobbyist on behalf of any foreign principal. There were serious concerns about lobbying firms representing foreign entities – and potentially values opposed to American principles – after Axis power agitprop was planted in American soils during World War II through the efforts of public-relations specialist Ivy Lee's proxy firm "German Dye Trust". As a result, in 1938, the Foreign Agents Registration Act or FARA was passed by Congress, and this law required foreign lobbyists to share information about their contracts with the Justice Department. FARA's mandate was to disclose to policymakers the sources of information that influenced public opinions, policies, and law. However, the goal was not to restrict the speech of the lobbyist or the content of the lobbying. Nonetheless, it was estimated that less than half of foreign lobbyists who should have registered under FARA actually did so.

By the 1960s, perceived failures in FARA's enforcement led to public outcry against lobbying excesses, while revelations of foreign bribery circulated regularly well into the early 1970s. This prompted legislation proposed to reduce the autonomy of foreign firms, most of which was not ratified for concerns over a lack of constitutionality. While the House of Representatives passed a rule to increase public scrutiny of foreign lobbying, one estimate was that about 75% of lobbyists were exempt from a registration requirement, including individuals representing foreign interests.

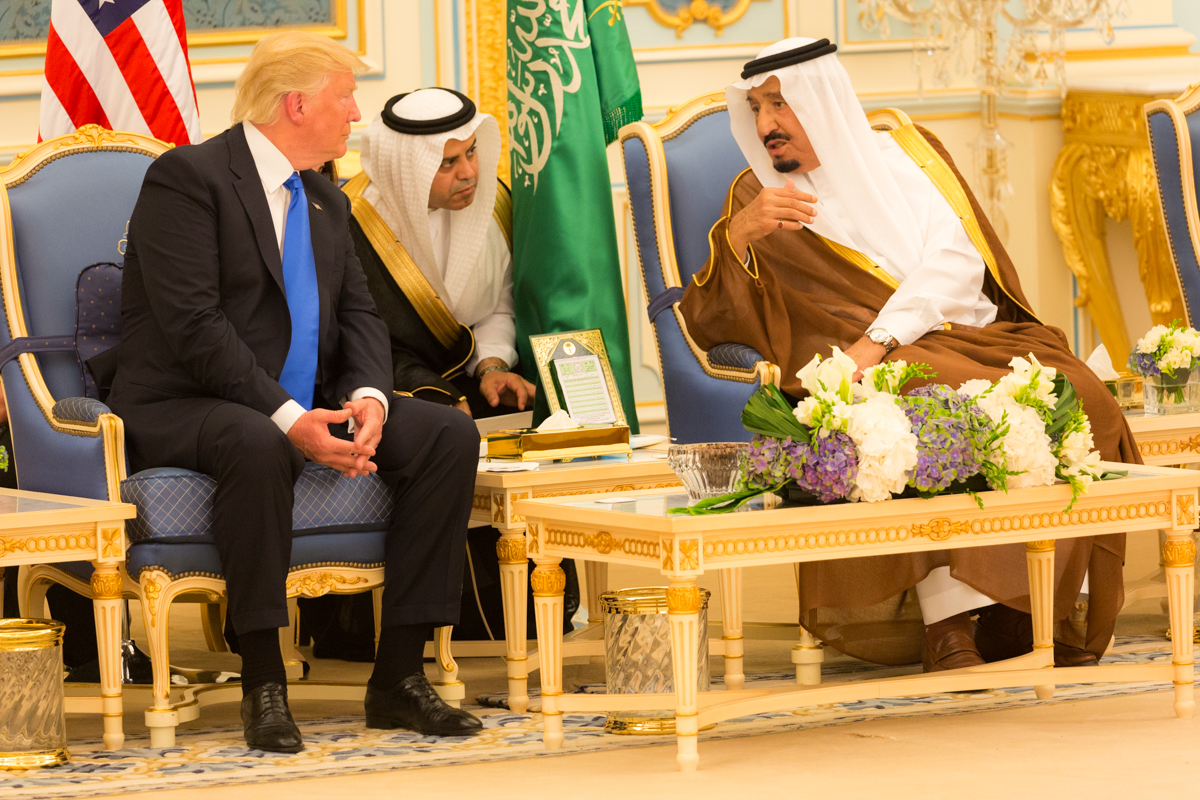
Saudi Arabia spent at least $7.5 million lobbying against the Justice Against Sponsors of Terrorism Act.

A general trend is that the number of lobbyists representing foreign companies is rising. The case of Washington's APCO Worldwide, a firm which represented the dictatorship of General Sani Abacha of Nigeria in 1995 whose regime had hanged nine pro-democracy activists, attracted negative publicity. While current law forbids foreign nations from contributing to federal, state, or local elections, loopholes allow American subsidiaries of foreign corporations to establish so-called separated segregated funds or SSFs to raise money. According to one view, the definition of which firms are defined as "foreign" was unclear, and the lack of clarity undermines the ability to regulate their activity. Foreign-funded lobbying efforts include those of Israel, Saudi Arabia, Turkey, Egypt, Greece, Pakistan, Libya, and China lobbies. In 2010, foreign governments spent approximately $460 million on lobbying Congress and the U.S. Government. Between 2015 and 2017, the Saudi Arabia paid $18 million to 145 registered lobbyists to influence the U.S. government.

While Congress has tried to quell criticisms against the leverage of domestic lobbying firms by updating domestic lobbying legislation – such as the revision of the Lobbyist Disclosure Act in 1997)—there was a report that its inaction in rectifying loopholes in foreign lobbying regulation has led to scandals. In 2008 Chinese diplomats lobbied the California legislature against a pro-Tibet resolution. There was a report of an upsurge of lobbying by foreign-owned U.S. subsidiaries against Democratic efforts to limit campaign spending in early 2010. The proposed was to restrict lobbying by U.S. subsidiaries of foreign firms. In 2011, the Chinese firm Alibaba hired a lobbying firm in Washington when it began contemplating a purchase of the U.S. firm Yahoo!. There was a case in which a lobbying effort described as "extraordinary" was trying to change the designation of a fringe Iranian opposition group from being a terrorist organization to being a benign organization. Lobbyists seeking to downgrade the designation hired influential foreign affairs officials, including former CIA directors, a former FBI director, and others to advocate for the change of designation. But there have been others accused of illegally lobbying for foreign nations or who failed to register as a foreign agent who may face prison time as a result.

== See also ==
- United States Chamber of Commerce
- History of lobbying in the United States
- Political action committee
- Citizens United
- Honest Leadership and Open Government Act of 2007
- Direct lobbying in the United States
- Campaign finance in the United States
- Fossil fuels lobby
- Opposition research
- OpenSecrets
- Jack Abramoff Indian lobbying scandal
- Jerry Lewis – Lowery lobbying firm controversy
- Lobbying Disclosure Act of 1995
- Military-industrial complex
- United States v. Harriss
- NARFE (National Active and Retired Federal Employees)
- Dark money
- Bribery
- Project Endgame

More...

== Notes ==
1. Federalist No. 10. p. 56 of the Dawson edition at Wikisource.
2. Federalist No. 10. p. 58 of the Dawson edition at Wikisource.
3. Federalist No. 10. p. 60 of the Dawson edition at Wikisource.
