= Robert G. Kaiser =

American journalist and author (born 1943)

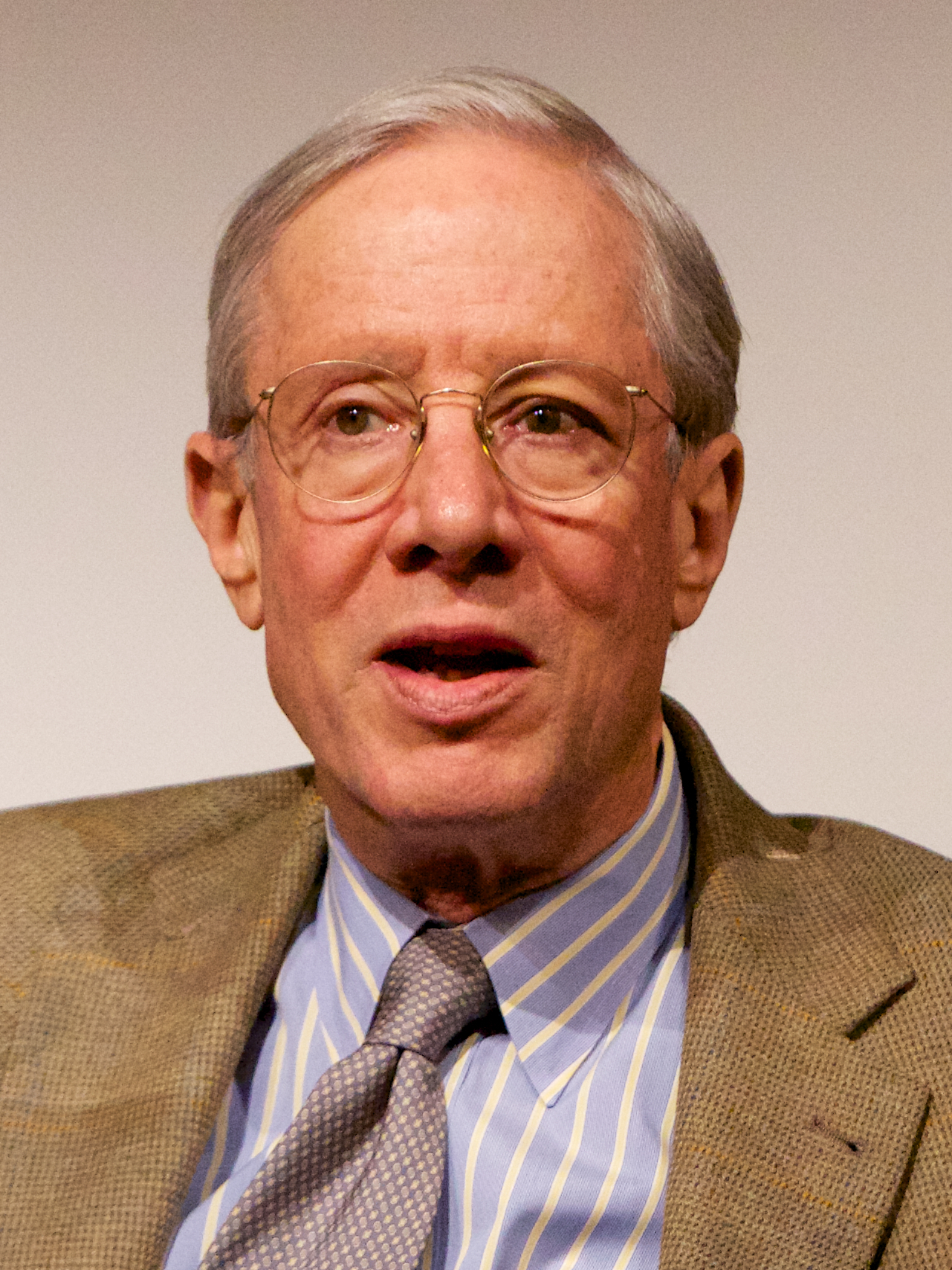
- Kaiser in 2014
- Born: 1943 (age 82–83); Washington, D.C., U.S.
- Education: Yale University; London School of Economics
- Occupations: Associate editor and senior correspondent of The Washington Post

Robert Greeley Kaiser (born 7 April 1943) is an American journalist and author. He retired from The Washington Post in early 2014 after a career of more than 50 years on the paper. During his career he served as managing editor (1991–98) and associate editor and senior correspondent (1998–2014). He is the author or co-author of eight books. After retiring he wrote a much-discussed article for the Post explaining his decision to move away from Washington D.C. after living there for most of 70 years.

== Career ==
Kaiser began at The Washington Post as a summer intern while still a college student. He has served as a special correspondent in London (1964–67), a reporter on the city desk in Washington, D.C. (1967–69), foreign correspondent in Saigon (1969–70) and Moscow (1971–74). He returned to the national staff in Washington and worked as a reporter for seven years, covering labor, the U.S. Senate, the 1980 presidential campaign and the first Ronald Reagan administration.

In January 1980, Kaiser authored an editorial column endorsing a boycott of the upcoming Moscow Olympics. The column was influential in motivating the administration of President Jimmy Carter to officially pursue an Olympic boycott; National Security Advisor Zbigniew Brzezinski made sure Carter read it.

In 1982 Kaiser became associate editor of The Washington Post and editor of "Outlook", a Sunday section of commentary and opinion. He also wrote a column for the section. From 1985 to 1990 he was assistant managing editor for national news, in charge of the paper's coverage of politics and the federal government. From 1990 to 1991 he was deputy managing editor, and from 1991 to 1998 served as the paper's managing editor.

In 2007, he wrote a series of articles there based on interviews of lobbyist Gerald Cassidy on the topic of lobbying in the United States. Later he published a book on lobbying, So Damn Much Money, based in part on Cassidy's career.

From late 2008 through 2009, Kaiser followed Rep. Barney Frank (D-MA) and Sen. Chris Dodd (D-CT) as they wrote and passed the Dodd–Frank Wall Street Reform and Consumer Protection Act. Both men and their staffs allowed Kaiser an inside view of the legislative process. Kaiser's 2013 book, Act of Congress: How America's Essential Institution Works, and How It Doesn't, was based on this unusual access.

Kaiser's work has appeared in the New York Review of Books, Esquire, Foreign Affairs, and many other publications. He has been a commentator on NPR's All Things Considered, and has appeared often on Meet the Press, the Today show and other television programs.

Kaiser also was a digital visionary, at least in the newspaper world. In 1992, he wrote a prescient memo about the digital threats and opportunities newspapers would face in the future. The memo led to the Post's early investment in creating a separate digital subsidiary, which launched the Post's Digital Ink product in 1994, followed soon after by washingtonpost.com.

== Family ==
Kaiser is the son of the late diplomat Philip Mayer Kaiser, who served as United States ambassador to Senegal and Austria. His brother is the journalist Charles Kaiser.

== Bibliography ==
External videos
- Booknotes interview with Kaiser on Why Gorbachev Happened, June 2, 1991, C-SPAN
- Book party hosted by The Washington Post for The News About the News, February 22, 2002, C-SPAN
- Book party hosted by the Chautauqua Institution for The News About the News, July 25, 2002, C-SPAN
- Presentation by Kaiser on So Damn Much Money, February 4, 2009, C-SPAN
- Panel discussion on Act of Congress, May 24, 2013, C-SPAN

Kaiser is the author of numerous books:

- Cold Winter, Cold War (1974).
- Russia, The People and the Power (1976).
- Great American Dreams (with Jon Lowell, 1978).
- Russia from the Inside (with Hannah Jopling Kaiser, 1980).
- Why Gorbachev Happened (1991)
- The Geography of Nationalism in Russia and the USSR. (1994).
- The News About the News: American Journalism in Peril (with Leonard Downie, Jr., 2002).
- So Damn Much Money: The Triumph of Lobbying and the Corrosion of American Government (2009).
- Act of Congress: How America's Essential Institution Works, and How It Doesn't (2013).

== Awards ==
The News About The News won Harvard University's Goldsmith prize for the best book of 2002 on politics and the news media. His dispatches from Moscow won the Overseas Press Club award for best foreign correspondence of the year in 1975. In 2003, he won the National Press Club prize for best diplomatic reporting of the year.

== See also ==
- Gerald Cassidy
- Lobbying in the United States
