= Gerald Cassidy =

Gerald Cassidy may refer to:

- Gerald Cassidy (lobbyist)
- Gerald Cassidy (artist)

== See also ==
- Gerard Cassidy, member of the Massachusetts House of Representatives
