= Lobbying Disclosure Act of 1995 =

United States law about lobbying

- Long title: An Act to provide for the disclosure of lobbying activities to influence the Federal Government, and for other purposes.
- Acronyms (colloquial): LDA
- Enacted by: the 104th United States Congress
- Effective: December 19, 1995

Citations
- Public law: 104-65
- Statutes at Large: 109 Stat. 691

Codification
- Titles amended: 2 U.S.C.: Congress
- U.S.C. sections created: 2 U.S.C. ch. 26 § 1601 et seq.

Legislative history
- Introduced in the Senate as S. 1060 by Carl Levin (D–MI) on July 21, 1995; Committee consideration by House Judiciary, House Government Reform and Oversight, House Rules, House Ways and Means; Passed the Senate on July 25, 1995 (98-0, Roll call vote 328, via Senate.gov); Passed the House on November 29, 1995 (passed voice vote, provisions of H.Res. 269); Signed into law by President Bill Clinton on December 19, 1995

The Lobbying Disclosure Act of 1995 (2 U.S.C. § 1601) was legislation in the United States aimed at bringing increased accountability to federal lobbying practices in the United States. The law was amended substantially by the Honest Leadership and Open Government Act of 2007. Under provisions which took effect on January 1, 1996, federal lobbyists are required to register with the Clerk of the United States House of Representatives and the Secretary of the United States Senate. Anyone failing to do so is punishable by a civil fine of up to $50,000. The clerk and secretary must refer any acts of non-compliance to the United States Attorney for the District of Columbia.

A consequence of the act is that the act "removed from Foreign Agents Registration Act a class of agents who are engaged in lobbying activities and who register under the LDA. This Act was administered by Congress."

== Background ==
Before the Lobbying Disclosure Act was passed, the Federal Regulation of Lobbying Act was the only act that regulated lobbying. The Federal Regulation of Lobbying Act was considered ineffective in achieving its objective (regulating lobbying). The FRLA was considered ineffective due to its vagueness and lack of clarity. During this time, lobbying had increased, which created the need for effective legislation for regulating lobbying. Along with the lack of coherent regulations towards lobbying, public and constituent pressure increased the urgency of creating the LDA. The rise of lobbying and lack of regulation raised a concern in the general public and specifically within Congress itself. This raised the concern about lobbying practices in a bipartisan manner, which led to even further pressure to address the problem. All these factors contributed to applying pressure to the government to come up with a bill, which led to the Lobbying Disclosure Act being enacted.

== Legislative History ==
The Lobbying Disclosure Act of 1995 was introduced on January 4, 1995, in the House and Senate and was passed on at the end of the year on December 29, 1995. The LDA went through many stages;

- On January 9, 1995, the Foreign Agents Registration Act was introduced in the House along with the Ramspeck Repeal Act in the Senate.
- No major changes happened to the legislation until May 8, 1995, when the Subcommittee on Post Office and Civil Service, Committee on Governmental Affairs in the Senate reviewed the Ramspeck Act.
- Later in the month on May 23 and 24, 1995, the Subcommittee on Constitution in the House held a hearing on the Reform of Laws Governing Lobbying, and later held the Ramspeck Act: Repeal, Reform, or Retention hearing.
- Two months later on July 24 and 25, 1995, the Senate held a debate on the consideration of S. 1060, followed by the consideration and passage of S. 1060.
- On September 7, 1995, the House held a hearing on the Lobbying Disclosure Reform Proposal.
- Several months later on November 14, 1995, there was a Committee Report with the committee on the judiciary in the House on the Lobbying Disclosure Act of 1995.
- In that same month on the November 16, 1995, the House floor debated H.R. 2564.
- The H.R. 2564 was debated again on the House floor on November 29, 1995, and tabled along with a hearing on the consideration and passage of S. 1060.
- Finally on December 29, 1995, the legislation was signed by the president and the Lobbying Disclosure Act of 1995 became law.

These steps illustrate legislative process the lobbying disclosure act undertook to become finalized as law.

== Bill provisions ==
=== Definitions ===
The LDA defines a number of provisions attempting to maintain a degree of transparency in the activities of lobbyists. The legislation defines a client as "any person or entity that employs or retains another person for financial or other compensation to conduct lobbying activities on behalf of that person or entity. A person or entity whose employees act as lobbyists on its own behalf is both a client and an employer of such employees." The legislation also defines "lobbyist": "The term "lobbyist" means any individual who is employed or retained by a client for financial or other compensation for services that include more than one lobbying contact, other than an individual whose lobbying activities constitute less than 20 percent of the time engaged in the services provided by such individual to that client over a three-month period". Also included in the legislation are the definitions of what actions must be disclosed which includes lobbying to certain members of the Executive and Legislative branches.

=== Exceptions ===
The legislation does not include those lobbyists whose "activities constitute less than 20 percent of the time engaged in services", thus failing to regulate grassroots (small donors) lobbying. The LDA includes a number of other "thresholds" that define what must be recorded. Any organization that spends more than $10,000 towards lobbying activities must also be registered. Amounts even slightly below this threshold are exempt from reporting. The outline for registration includes "name, address, business telephone number, and principal place of business of the registrant, and a general description of its business or activities", as well as for the client. The register must also include a statement of what issues the registrant expects to lobby or what may have already been lobbied.

After recording, the records are maintained by the Clerk of the House and the Secretary of the Senate. Due to severe understaffing, these two offices are unable to check for illegal activities or corrupt practices, which is the most glaring shortcoming of the legislation.

During a hearing before the Senate Committee on Rules and Administration, Senator Christopher Dodd stated that "[s]ince 2003, the Office of Public Records has referred over 2,000 cases to the Department of Justice, and nothing's been heard from them again".

=== Amendment ===
The Honest Leadership and Open Government Act of 2007 brought significant changes to the Lobbying Disclosure Act of 1995. It mandated quarterly filing of lobbying reports, introduced electronic filing requirements, and expanded disclosure obligations for registered lobbyists. The Act required disclosure of lobbyists' contributions, prohibited certain gifts and travel provided by lobbyists to government officials, and imposed stricter enforcement measures, including increased civil penalties and criminal sanctions for non-compliance. Additionally, it aimed to enhance transparency in lobbying activities by making lobbying activity reports readily accessible to the public online and by addressing conflicts of interest among government officials.

== See also ==
- Lobbying in the United States
- 1996 United States campaign finance controversy
- Federal Regulation of Lobbying Act of 1946
