= Honest Leadership and Open Government Act =

United States lobbying law

Honest Leadership and Open Government Act of 2007
- Other short titles: Commission to Strengthen Confidence in Congress Act of 2007; Congressional Pension Accountability Act; Legislative Transparency and Accountability Act of 2007
- Long title: An Act to provide greater transparency in the legislative process.
- Acronyms (colloquial): HLOGA
- Enacted by: the 110th United States Congress
- Effective: September 14, 2007

Citations
- Public law: 110-81
- Statutes at Large: 121 Stat. 735

Codification
- Titles amended: 2 U.S.C.: Congress
- U.S.C. sections amended: 2 U.S.C. ch. 26 § 1601 et seq.

Legislative history
- Introduced in the Senate as S. 1 by Harry Reid (D–NV) on January 4, 2007; Passed the Senate on January 18, 2007 (96-2, Roll call vote 19, via Senate.gov); Passed the House on July 31, 2007 (411-8, Roll call vote 763, via Clerk.House.gov) with amendment; Senate agreed to House amendment on August 2, 2007 (83-14, Roll call vote 294, via Senate.gov); Signed into law by President George W. Bush on September 14, 2007

The Honest Leadership and Open Government Act of 2007 (Pub. L. 110–81 (text) (PDF), 121 Stat. 735, enacted September 14, 2007) is a law of the United States federal government that amended parts of the Lobbying Disclosure Act of 1995. It strengthens public disclosure requirements concerning lobbying activity and funding, places more restrictions on gifts for members of Congress and their staff, and provides for mandatory disclosure of earmarks in expenditure bills. The bill was signed into law by President George W. Bush on September 14, 2007.

== Bill sponsors ==
Main Sponsor: Sen Reid, Harry M.

Co-sponsors:

- Sen Bennett, Robert F. [UT] – 1/4/2007
- Sen Brown, Sherrod [OH] – 1/8/2007
- Sen Cantwell, Maria [WA] – 1/4/2007
- Sen Collins, Susan M. [ME] – 1/4/2007
- Sen Durbin, Richard [IL] – 1/4/2007
- Sen Feinstein, Dianne [CA] – 1/4/2007
- Sen Lautenberg, Frank R. [NJ] – 1/4/2007
- Sen Leahy, Patrick J. [VT] – 1/4/2007
- Sen Lieberman, Joseph I. [CT] – 1/4/2007
- Sen Lott, Trent [MS] – 1/4/2007
- Sen McConnell, Mitch [KY] – 1/4/2007
- Sen Menendez, Robert [NJ] – 1/4/2007
- Sen Mikulski, Barbara A. [MD] – 1/4/2007
- Sen Salazar, Ken [CO] – 1/9/2007
- Sen Schumer, Charles E. [NY] – 1/4/2007
- Sen Stabenow, Debbie [MI] – 1/4/2007
- Sen Webb, Jim [VA] – 1/4/2007

== Details of the bill ==
Closing the revolving door

- Prohibits senators from gaining undue lobbying access by increasing the "cooling off" period for senators from one to two years before they can lobby Congress.
- Prohibits Cabinet secretaries and other very senior executive personnel from lobbying the department or agency in which they worked for two years after they leave their position.
- Prohibits senior Senate staff and Senate officers from lobbying contacts with the entire Senate for one year, instead of just their former employing office.
- Prohibits senior House staff from lobbying their former office or committee for one year after they leave House employment.
- Requires that executive and legislative branch employees who leave government positions and seek to lobby on behalf of Indian tribes face the same revolving door provisions as others. It exempts those who serve as elected or appointed officials of Indian tribes.

Ending the "K Street Project"

- Prohibits Members and their staff from influencing hiring decisions of private organizations on the sole basis of partisan political gain. Subjects those who violate this provision to a fine and imprisonment for up to 15 years.

Prohibiting gifts by lobbyists

- Prohibits lobbyists from providing gifts or travel to Members of Congress with knowledge that the gift or travel is in violation of House or Senate Rules.

Full public disclosure of lobbying activity

- Requires lobbyist disclosure filings to be filed twice as often, by decreasing the time between filing from semi-annual to quarterly.
- Requires lobbyist disclosures in both the Senate and House to be filed electronically and requires creation of a public searchable Internet database of such information.
- Increases civil penalty for knowing and willful violations of the Lobby Disclosure Act from $50,000 to $200,000 and imposes a criminal penalty of up to five years for knowing and corrupt failure to comply with the Act.
- Requires the Government Accountability Office to audit annually lobbyist compliance with disclosure rules.
- Requires lobbyists to certify they have not given gifts or travel that would violate Senate or House rules.
- Requires the disclosure of businesses or organizations that contribute more than $5,000 and actively participate in lobbying activities by certain coalitions and associations.

New transparency for lobbyist political donations, bundling and other financial contributions

- Requires disclosure to the Federal Election Commission when lobbyists bundle over $15,000 semiannually in campaign contributions for any federal elected official, candidate (including Senate, House and Presidential), or leadership PAC.
- Requires lobbyists to disclose to the Secretary of the Senate and the House Clerk their campaign contributions and payments to Presidential libraries, Inaugural Committees or entities controlled by, named for or honoring Members of Congress.

Congressional pension accountability

- Denies Congressional retirement benefits to Members of Congress who are convicted of bribery, perjury, conspiracy or other related crimes in the course of carrying out their official duties as a Member of Congress.

Prohibited use of private aircraft

- Requires that candidates, other than those running for a seat in the House, pay the fair market value of airfare (charter rates) when using non-commercial jets to travel. (This affects senate, presidential and vice-presidential candidates)
- Requires candidates for the House to comply with rule XXIII (15), which prohibits use of non-commercial aircraft.

Toughening penalties for falsifying financial disclosure forms

- Increases the penalty for Members of Congress, Senior Staff and Senior Executive officials for falsifying or failing to report financial disclosure forms from $10,000 to $50,000 and establishes criminal penalties of up to one year of imprisonment.

=== Amending House ethics rules ===
Disclosure by Members and staff of employment negotiations

- Prohibits Members from engaging in any agreements or negotiations about future employment until a successor has been selected unless the Member files a statement with the Committee on Standards of Official Conduct; and requires that Members recuse themselves from any matter in which there is a conflict of interest or appearance of a conflict.

Requires senior staff to notify the Committee on Standards of Official Conduct within three days if they engage in negotiations or agreements for future employment or compensation.

- Prohibition on Lobbying Contacts with Spouses who Are Registered Lobbyists

Requires that Members prohibit their staff from having any lobbying contact with the Member's spouse if such individual is a registered lobbyist or is employed or retained by a registered lobbyist to influence legislation.

Posting of travel and financial disclosure reports on the Internet

- Requires that travel by members financed by outside groups be posted on a searchable, sortable and downloadable website by August 1, 2008.
- Requires that Members' financial disclosure forms be posted on a searchable, sortable and downloadable website by August 1, 2008.

Participation in lobbyist-sponsored events during political conventions

- Prohibits Members from attending parties held in their honor at national party conventions if they have been sponsored by lobbyists, unless the Member is the party's presidential or vice presidential nominee.

=== Amending Senate ethics rules ===
Procedural reform

- Allows the Senate to delete "dead of night" additions from conference reports (when the new matter was not approved by either House) unless 60 senators vote in favor of keeping the matter in the conference report.
- Seeks to end secret Senate holds by requiring the senator placing a hold on a legislative matter or nomination publicly disclose that hold within five days.
- Requires that Senate committees and subcommittees post video recordings, audio recordings or transcript of all public meetings on the Internet.
- Expresses that conference committee processes should be open and transparent.

Congressionally directed spending reform

- Requires that all congressionally directed spending items, limited tax benefits and limited tariff benefits are identified in bills, resolutions, conference reports and managers' statements be identified and posted on the internet at least 48 hours before a vote.
- Requires that senators certify that they and their immediate family will not financially benefit from a congressionally directed spending item, limited tax benefits and limited tariff that they are seeking.
- Requires that committees, to the greatest extent practicable, disclose in unclassified language the funding level and the name of the sponsor of congressionally directed spending included in classified portions of bills, joint resolutions and conference reports.
- Allows the Senate to delete new directed spending in a conference report (when the new spending was not approved by either House) unless 60 senators vote in favor of keeping the provision.

Post-employment restrictions

- Prohibits senators from lobbying Congress for two years after they leave office.
- Prohibits officers and senior employees from lobbying the Senate for one year after they leave Senate employment.

Disclosure by senators and staff of employment negotiations

- Requires senators to disclose within three business days any negotiations they engage in to secure future employment before their successor is elected and prohibits them from seeking employment as a registered lobbyist before they leave office.
- Requires senior staff to notify the Ethics Committee within three days of beginning negotiations for future employment and to recuse themselves should employment negotiations create a conflict of interest.

Elimination of floor, parking and gym privileges for former Members who become lobbyists

- Revokes floor privileges and the use of the Members' exercise facilities and parking for former senators, former Secretaries of the Senate, former Sergeants at Arms of the Senate and former Speakers of the House who are registered lobbyists.

Influencing hiring decisions (K Street Project)

- Prohibits members from influencing hiring decisions of private organizations on the sole basis of partisan political gain.

Ban on gifts from lobbyists and entities that hire lobbyists

- Prohibits senators and their staff from accepting gifts from registered lobbyists or entities that hire or employ them.
- Requires entertainment and sports tickets to be valued at market rates.

National party conventions

- Prohibits senators from attending parties held in their honor at national party conventions if they have been sponsored by lobbyists, unless the senator is the party's presidential or vice presidential nominee.

Restrictions on lobbyist participation in travel

- Prohibits senators and their staff from accepting private travel from registered lobbyists or the entities that hire them.
- Limits lobbyists from organizing, arranging, requesting or participating in travel by senators or their staff.
- Allows senators and their staff, with pre-approval from the Ethics Committee, to accept travel by entities that employ lobbyists if it is necessary to participate in a one-day meeting, speaking engagement, fact-finding trip or similar event.
- Allows senators and their staff to accept travel provided by 501(c)(3) organizations if the trip has been pre-approved by the Ethics Committee.
- Requires senators and their staff to disclose the expenses reimbursed by a private entity not later than 30 days after the travel is completed.
- Requires that the Ethics Committee be provided with a written certification that the trip will not be financed, planned, organized, requested or arranged in any part by a registered lobbyist and that the traveler will not be accompanied on any segment of the trip by a registered lobbyist.
- Requires that senators pay the fair market value (charter rates) for flights on private jets not operated or paid for by an air carrier that is certified by the Federal Aviation Administration.

Attendance at constituent events

- Allows senators and their staff to accept free attendance at a conference, site visit, dinner or other event in their home state if it is sponsored and attended by a group of constituents, provided that there are no registered lobbyists in attendance, and that the cost of any meal served is less than $50.

Senate privately paid travel public website

- Requires that travel by members financed by outside groups be posted on a searchable website by January 1, 2008.

Lobbying contact with spouses or immediate family members who are registered lobbyists

- Prohibits Senate spouses who are registered lobbyists from engaging in lobbying contacts with any Senate office. It exempts Senate spouses who were serving as registered lobbyists at least one year prior to the most recent election of their spouse to office, or at least one year prior to their marriage to that Member.

Prohibits senators' immediate family members who are registered lobbyists from engaging in lobbying contacts with their family member's staff.

Mandatory Senate ethics training for members and staff

- Requires the Ethics Committee to conduct ongoing ethics training and awareness programs for senators and Senate staff.

Annual reports on ethics enforcement

- Directs the Ethics Committee to issue annual reports listing the number of: alleged violations of Senate rules, alleged violations that were dismissed, alleged violations that led to a preliminary inquiry, alleged violations that resulted in an adjudicatory review, alleged violations that the committee dismissed; and the number of letters of admonition issued and the number of matters resulting in disciplinary sanction.

== Criticism ==
In April 2014, the Sunlight Foundation opined that the HLOGA of 2007 drove lobbyists underground. In January 2015, a report by the Sunlight Foundation and OpenSecrets found that of 104 former congressional members and staffers whose "cooling off" period ended during the first session of the 114th Congress which opened January 6, 2015, 29 were already in government relations, "public affairs," or serve as counsel at a firm that lobbies, and 13 of those are even registered as lobbyists.

== Notes ==
Both 2008 presidential candidates Barack Obama and John McCain offered amendments to the act, although neither were official cosponsors of the final act. The bill passed easily by an 83–14 margin, with Obama voting for and McCain voting against.
