= Cassidy & Associates =

US government relations firm

- Type: Private
- Industry: Government Relations
- Founded: 1977
- Key people: Gerald S. J. Cassidy, Founder
- Website: Official website

Cassidy & Associates is a Washington, D.C.-based government relations firm established in 1977 by Gerald S. J. Cassidy. The firm focuses on lobbying the United States government for corporations and organizations.

== History ==
Cassidy & Associates worked to obtain Congressional support for the 1995 visit of Lee Teng-hui to the United States to speak at Cornell University. Lee's statements during the visit led to the Third Taiwan Strait Crisis.

=== 1999–2010 ===
In 1999 and 2000, Cassidy & Associates led all lobbying firms in reported income.

In 2004, Cassidy & Associates began representing Equatorial Guinean president Teodoro Obiang, labeled "one of Africa's most notorious dictators," according to Mother Jones magazine. According to the U.S. Department of Justice, Obiang paid Cassidy & Associates at least $120,000 per month. Mother Jones described the firm as almost "a shadow foreign ministry" for Equatorial Guinea.

In 2007, The Washington Post reported, "Cassidy helped invent the new Washington" and had become the "creator and proprietor of the most lucrative lobbying firm in Washington."

Kai Anderson, former deputy chief of staff to the U.S. Senate Majority Leader Harry Reid, serves as the firm's chief executive officer, and Barry Rhoads, former deputy general counsel to the 1991 Department of Defense Base Realignment and Closure Commission (BRAC), serves as its chairman.

=== 2011–2019 ===
In 2015, the firm's founder and namesake, Gerald S. J. Cassidy, stepped down after 38 years of leading the firm.

The firm reported earning $12.85 million in 2015, according to records filed under the Lobbying Disclosure Act (LDA) with the Secretary of the U.S. Senate and Clerk of the U.S. House of Representatives.

In 2017, medias reports stated that the firm had been hired by Egyptian intelligence services. The Egyptian government had been accused of human rights violations and had hired Cassidy & Associates and Weber Shandwick, the firm's parent company. Weber Shandwick stopped working with Egypt in July 2017.

In June 2017, Cassidy announced a management buyout from The Interpublic Group (IPG), returning it to an independent firm.

In 2018, the company received $14,170,000 in income from various companies for lobbying the United States government. According to The Washington Post, its founder, Gerald Cassidy, was once worth $125 million, possibly the richest Washington lobbyist.

=== 2020s ===
In December 2023, Cassidy & Associates announced hiring two new senior legislative and policy experts. Among them were James Sauls, former chief of staff to Senator Dianne Feinstein (D-CA), and Neil Kornze, former Bureau of Land Management Director. Both Sauls and Kornze joined the firm as senior vice presidents, bringing their experience in government and policy to Cassidy & Associates.
