= Gerald Cassidy (lobbyist) =

American lawyer

- Born: 1940 (age 85–86)
- Education: Villanova University; Cornell Law
- Occupation: Lobbyist
- Known for: Co-founder of Cassidy & Associates

Gerald S. J. "Gerry" Cassidy (born 1940) is a lobbyist in Washington, D.C. He is the co-founder and CEO of Cassidy & Associates. Cassidy is a central figure in the 2009 book on lobbying, So Damn Much Money: The Triumph of Lobbying and the Corrosion of American Government.

Cassidy was born 1940, the son of a self-reliant practical nurse with a shakey marriage; she moved him and his three sisters from house to house in Brooklyn and Queens throughout his childhood.

He is a graduate of Villanova University (B.S. 1963) and Cornell Law (J.D. 1967).

Cassidy & Associates pioneered the use of congressional earmarks, used to obtain grants for university clients; Cassidy himself sat on the board of Villanova University and Boston University. Cassidy was also an aide to Sen. George McGovern and general counsel of the Democratic National Committee's Party Reform Commission.

In March 2000, Cassidy was named #52 on the Forbes "The Power 100." In early 2007, he became the subject of an extensive Washington Post series, addressing details of his personal life and professional success.

In 2013, Cassidy stepped down from the day-to-day leadership of Cassidy & Associates and became chairman emeritus.
