= Direct lobbying in the United States =

Direct lobbying in the United States are methods used by lobbyists to influence United States legislative bodies. Interest groups from many sectors spend billions of dollars on lobbying.

Three laws govern U.S. lobbying. These require that a lobbying entity must be registered, allow nonprofit organizations to lobby, require organizations to present quarterly reports about their lobbying, restricts gifts to members of Congress, and require earmarks to be disclosed in expenditure bills.

Many former federal employees – for example, members of the Federal Communications Commission (FCC) – become lobbyists and vice versa, a practice known as the revolving door.

== Theory ==
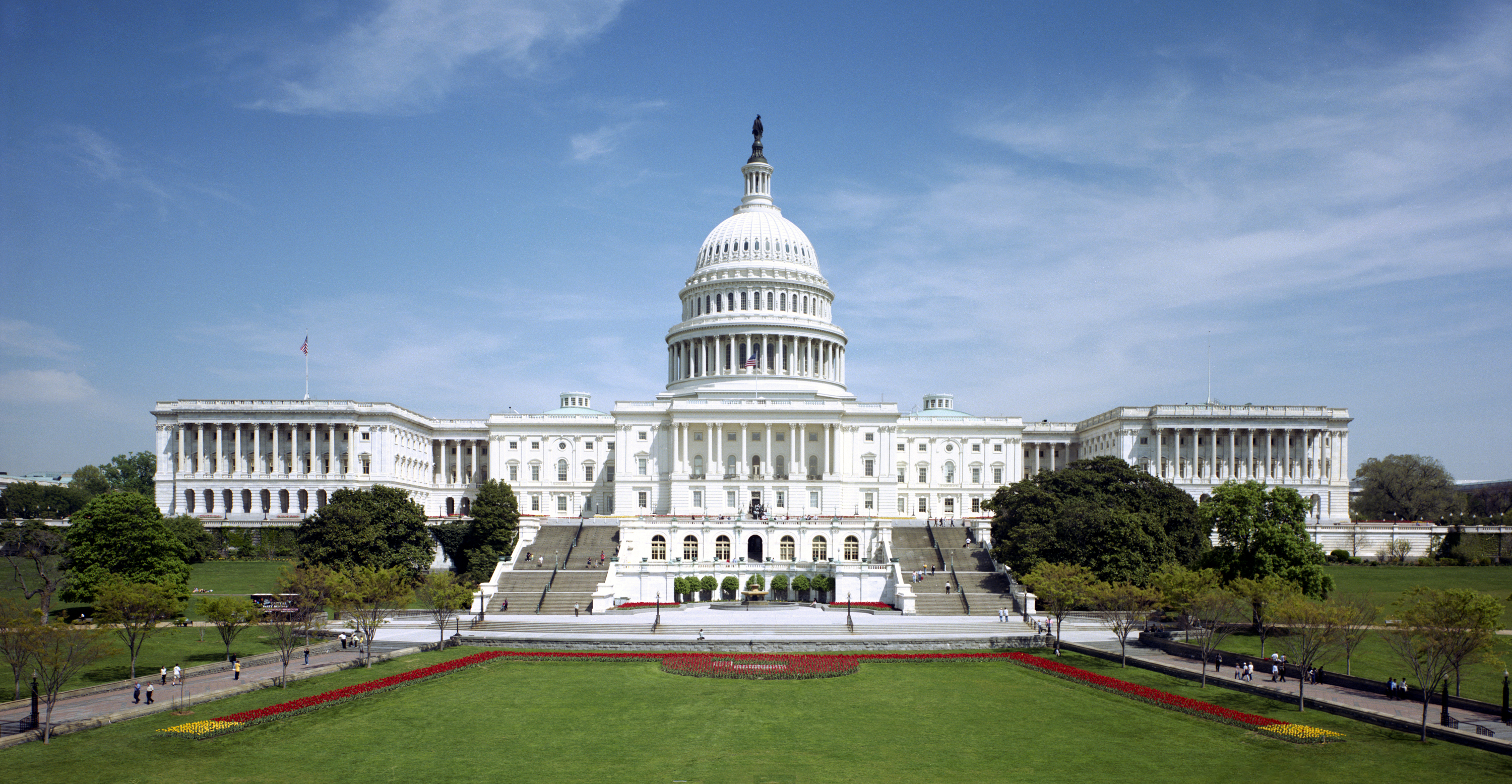
Washington, D.C. is home to 11,140 registered lobbyists and an estimated 90,000 unregistered lobbyists

Lobbying, a standard method used to influence or change a piece of legislation, is a common practice at all levels of legislature, including the United States Congress and local legislation. In the U.S., direct lobbying involves direct methods used by a lobbyist when attempting to influence a legislative body. It is done either through direct communication with members or employees of the legislative body, or with a government official who participates in formulating legislation. During the direct lobbying process, the lobbyist introduces statistics that will inform the legislator of any recent information that might otherwise be missed, makes political threats or promises, and supplies favors. A common use of direct lobbying is to persuade the general public about a ballot proposal. In this case, the public is considered to be the legislator. This aspect of direct lobbying attempts to alter the legislature before it is placed on the ballot. Communications regarding a ballot measure are also considered direct lobbying. Direct lobbying is different from grassroots lobbying, a process that uses direct communication with the general public, who in turn, contacts and influences the government. Washington, D.C. is the home to many firms that employ these strategies, with 11,140 registered lobbyists currently residing in the area.

The goals of lobbyist most commonly used are:

- To facilitate market entry through the adoption of new rules, or the repeal or revision of old ones.
- To remove regulatory obstacles to the growth of ones company.
- To stop others from attaining regulatory changes that would harm ones company's business or cause.

According to a meta-analysis, it was discovered that direct lobbying is used alongside grassroots lobbying. There is evidence that groups are much more likely to directly lobby previous allies rather than opponents. Allies are also directly lobbied if a counter lobby is brought to light. The results suggest that groups lobby in ways designed obtain the most influence for their view. When groups have strong ties to a legislator's district, those groups will use a combination of grassroots and direct lobbying, even if the legislator's original position does not support theirs, which may help groups expand their supportive coalitions. When strong district ties are not present, groups tend to rely on direct lobbying with committee allies, because they assume that their political friends will be drawn to participate with the lobbyist view.

== Spending ==
=== Lobbying sectors ===
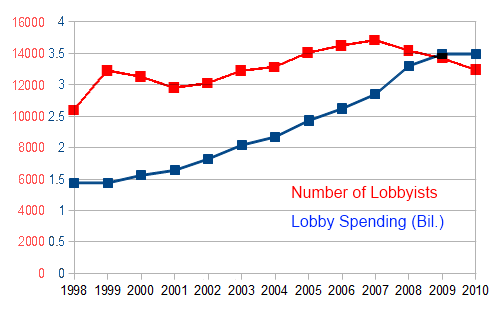
Direct lobbying statistics in the United States from 1998 to 2010

In 2010, the total amount spent on lobbying in the U.S. was $3.50 billion. The top sectors for lobbying as of 2010 are financial, insurance, real estate, with $4,405,909,610 spent on lobbying. The financial, insurance, real estate sector is the largest source of campaign contributions. The sector includes insurance companies, securities and investment firms, real estate interests and commercial banks. During the 2008 real estate crisis, the sector spent $468.8 million on lobbying.

Health is the second largest sector by spending, with $4,369,979,173 recorded in 2010. An increase in spending was seen in 2009 with the legislature formation of Health bills, and health insurance laws. Over 1 million per day is spent on influencing health legislature starting in 2009.

The top lobbying clients from 1998–2010 are the US Chamber of Commerce with $738,825,680, American Medical Association with $243,277,500, and General Electric with $236,580,000.

=== Interest groups ===
An array of interest groups take part in political influence, whenever an opportunity arises, such as a health care reform, election, and economic reform. These groups include opposing view-points, such as support or opposition to legal abortion care, and other strongly controversial issues.

Abortion policy interest groups spend significant money on lobbying. Pro-choice groups spend more on lobbying than anti-abortion groups. When anti-abortion groups donate to politicians, they donate most of their funds to Republican Party representatives. During the 2008 election period, pro-choice organizations spent $1.7 million on lobbying efforts and anti-abortion groups spent approximately $607,550. Anti-abortion groups such as the Susan B. Anthony List contributed $1,937,124 and the National Pro-Life Alliance contributed $241,999 in the 2009–2010 fiscal year. Two of the most active pro-choice groups, Planned Parenthood and NARAL Pro-Choice America, spent a total of $1,237,197 on lobbying in 2009–2010.

Education centers, such as school districts, colleges, and universities are not allowed to directly lobby, however they are allowed to be represented by associated individuals in the field. The education interest group does not include teacher unions. Spending from the education group increases around election periods, and has been increasing in the last couple of years. During the 2008 election period, education donated 82% of $54.7 million to the Democratic Party, with increases in Democratic support by the education group in the following years. University of California spent $1,264,704 on lobbying, making it the top spender in the education group for the 2009–2010 fiscal year period. It is followed by, Harvard University with $709,532 and Stanford University with $618,475.

The oil and gas sector companies are among the groups that are the biggest spenders on lobbying, especially with the recent Deepwater Horizon oil spill putting restrictions on their ability to do offshore drilling. During the 2008 elections, oil companies spent a total of $132.2 million into lobbying for law reform. The three biggest spenders from the oil and gas sector group are Koch Industries ($1,931,562), Exxon Mobil Corporation ($1,337,058) and Chief Oil & Gas ($1,192,361).

Interest group lobbying is split by political affiliation. In 2010, the top industries spending for the Democratic Party are lawyers and law firms with $49,226,482, followed by health professionals with $22,000,497 and the retirement industry with $21,674,025. The largest percentage supporters of the party are industrial unions (98% Democratic, 2% Republican), building trade unions (93% Democratic, 8% Republican), and the public sector unions (91% Democratic, 9% Republican). In 2010, the top industries spending for the Republic Party are the retirement industry ($17,304,174), health professionals ($16,080,916) and investment industries ($12,151,945). The largest percentage supporters of the party are business services (70% Republican, 30% Democratic), and lawyers and law firms (82% Republican, 18% Democratic).

== Lobbying laws ==
=== Lobbying Disclosure Act ===
The Lobbying Disclosure Act of 1995 was passed by the U.S. Senate and signed into law by President Bill Clinton on December 15, 1995. Under a revision done on January 1, 2006, the Act state that any lobbying entity must be registered with the Secretary of the Senate and the Clerk of the House of Representatives. The registration must occur within 45 days after the individual lobbyist makes a first plan to contact, or lobby, to the President, Vice President, or any highly ranked Federal official. Those that do not follow in accordance with the Disclosure Act are penalized, including fines of over $50,000 and being reported to the United States Attorney.

=== Public Charity Lobbying Law ===
Logo of the Internal Revenue Service

The Public Charity Lobbying Law gives nonprofit organizations the opportunity to lobby without losing their nonprofit status with the Internal Revenue Service. Under Section 501(c)(3) of the Internal Revenue Code, nonprofit organizations are not allowed to use a "substantial" part of their spending on lobbying, with substantial spending amounting to about 5% of the organization's revenue. Organizations must elect to use the Public Charity Law, and when so doing, the spending on lobbying may increase to 20% for the first $500,000 of their annual expenditures, followed by 15% for the next $500,000, up to 1 million dollars. Organizations must file a Form 5768 with the IRS to monitor the expenses of the organization. Another aspect to the elected law are the spending restrictions between direct lobbying and grassroots lobbying. No more than 20% can be spent on grassroots lobbying at any given time, while 100% of the lobbying expenditures can be on direct lobbying.

=== Honest Leadership and Open Government Act ===
The Honest Leadership and Open Government Act is a bill that was signed on September 15, 2007 by President George W. Bush, amending the Lobbying Disclosure Act of 1995. Included in the bill are certain provisions that require a quarterly reports on lobby spending by organizations, places restrictions on gifts for Congress members and provides for mandatory disclosure of earmarks in expenditure bills. This act places restrictions on the revolving door in direct lobbying.

We recommend the U.S. Attorney for the District of Columbia complete efforts to develop plans for a structured approach to focus limited resources on those lobbyists that continually fail to file as required or are otherwise not in compliance.

— Recommendation of the General Accounting Office to Congress in September 2008

== Revolving door ==
In lobbying, the revolving door is the cycling of former federal employees into jobs as lobbyists while former K Street employees are pulled into government positions. Government officials can only work certain terms in their positions, for example senators, and afterwards they form valuable connections that could help influence future law making. The other form of the revolving door is pushing lobbyists into government positions, and then developing connections and returning into the lobbying world to use said connections. This is a controversial issue in the political lobbying world.

A U.S. Congress member has a limited amount of serving time, and has the possibility of not being re-elected, or stepping down. During the 2010 elections there was an increase in Congress members leaving Capitol Hill. Out of the 120 previous members, 72 have found employment. 21.8% employed at lobbying firm, while 11.5% became a lobbying client. 326 revolving door lobbyists are part of the Barack Obama Administration. 527 revolving door lobbyist were part of the Bush Administration, compared to 358 during the Clinton Administration.

Industries use lobbyists to influence their positions during legislature, certain industries seek out a specific type of lobbyist. These industries seek out revolving door lobbyists that have connections with their specific industry. The top industries for using revolving door lobbyists are Beer, Wine & Liquor (79.9% profiled lobbyists), Tobacco (78% profiled lobbyists), and Finance/Credit Companies (76.7% profiled lobbyists).

=== Examples ===
- In 1999, Jeffrey Shockey joined a lobbyist firm, Copeland, Lowery, Jacquez, Denton & Shockey after having worked for Representative Jerry Lewis for eight years as a Congressional staffer in Capitol Hill. After working for the lobbyist firm for six years, Shockey returned to work for Lewis, after Lewis gained the Appropriations Committee chairmanship in the House of Representatives. In 2006, there was controversy after he gained the job with Lewis because of payout money he received from the lobbying firm. The payout money amounts to nearly $2 million.
- Bill Richardson, a former governor of New Mexico, ended his term as a governor and entered the revolving door. He took up a job with APCO Worldwide.

== Corporate media lobby ==
The American corporate media lobby has been involved in the shaping of media ownership regulations since the early days of the industry. In that time, they have repeatedly sought their own interests by direct lobbying, in many cases at the expense of the public interest.

=== Contemporary corporate media lobby ===
Logo of the Federal Communications Commission

Throughout most of its history, the FCC has been a relatively invisible part of the U.S. government, known mostly to industry stakeholders, lobbyists, and officials. With the general public not knowing its practices and responsibilities, this has given a tremendous advantage to those knowledgeable of the FCC's practices and organized enough to influence them. Jeff Chester, the executive director of Center for Digital Democracy, "The FCC has long been the second home to a legion of (lawyers and lobbyists) ... whose occupation is convincing the staff and commissioners to approve policies that benefit a particular company or industry."

There is evidence that the FCC continues to be influenced by the corporate media lobby. The strong, direct relationships that have developed over the years between regulators and corporate media lobbyists, is essential to greater influence. It goes much deeper than the idea that the lobby has simply been around for a while. Members of the FCC have traditionally had strong connections to industry. As the job of an FCC commissioner or staffer is often highly technical, and specific knowledge of the dynamics of the telecommunications and media industries must be known, commissioners are often plucked out of high-paying jobs in the industry. History has shown, due to the fact that FCC Commissioners are appointed only to five-year terms, that there is a revolving door between the Commission and industry.

[T]hey usually go directly to work for the media or telecommunications businesses after they leave office.

—Jeff Chester, executive director of Center for Digital Democracy

FCC commissioners often become influential lobbyists after their terms expire. Many of the lobbyists that frequent the FCC's office are, "not infrequently including ex-commissioners and ex-chairs"; Chester remarked that all of the former FCC commissioners in the last thirty years moved over into the lobbying sector soon after.

Politicians and businesses want the most knowledgeable and well-connected individuals working for them, which keeps the pool of potential hires quite small. The most influential lobbying strategy – access – is an advantage of the corporate media lobby.

==== Examples ====
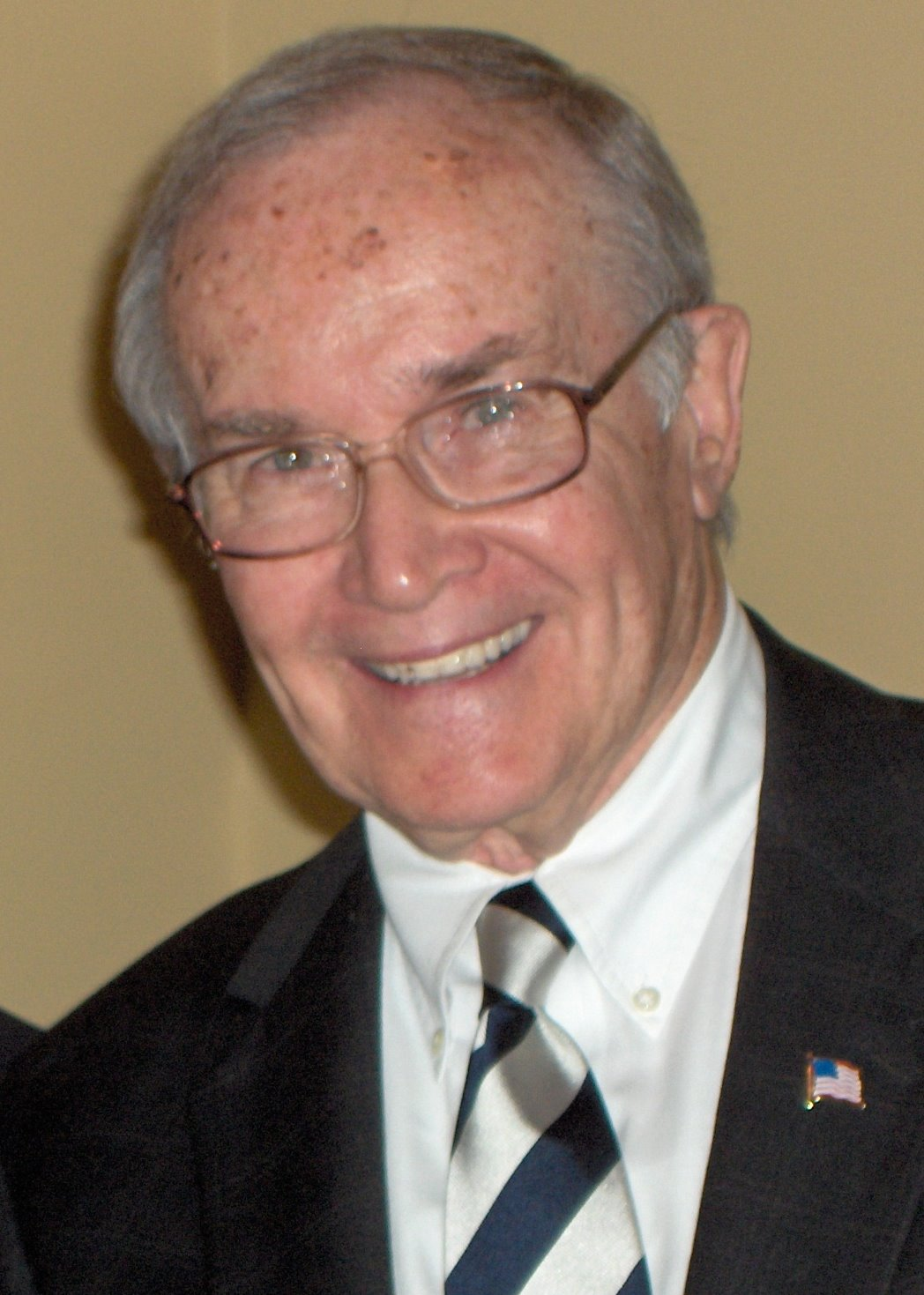
Newton Minow, chairman of the FCC from 1961 — 1963.

- Newton Minow — After leaving the FCC where he was chairman from 1961 — 1963, he became a partner at Sidley Austin LLP, one of US' largest law firms. In more recent years, he has served on the boards of media companies such as CBS and Chicago Tribune. He has also worked with advertising companies including Foote, Cone & Belding.
- E. William Henry — Chairman from 1963 through 1966 who became an industry lawyer after leaving FCC.
- Dean Burch — Chairman from 1969 to 1974 who also became an industry lawyer after leaving FCC. After practicing as an industry lawyer, he left his practice to run Intelsat, an organization that manages global communications satellites.
- Richard Wiley — Chairman from 1974 to 1977. He is still described today as the FCC's "sixth commissioner". His law firm Wiley Rein & Fielding LLP has represented both industry advocacy groups as well as numerous media conglomerates including Time Warner, Gannett, Clear Channel, CBS, Verizon, Microsoft and General Electric. In recent years, Wiley has become extremely influential and has "supplied more lawyers to the important telecommunications posts in the Bush administration than any other firm". Former Wiley Rein & Fielding associates were also appointed to important posts in the White House as well as various cabinet positions during the Bush administration. Other former Wiley associates have also been advisers to some US Senators, including Bill Frist. Even former FCC chairman Kevin Martin worked for Wiley Rein & Fielding at one point.
