= Copeland Lowery =

- Company type: Lobbying firm
- Founded: 1992; 34 years ago
- Founder: James Copeland
- Headquarters: California, United States

Copeland Lowery Jacquez Denton & White is a California lobbying firm founded by James Copeland in 1992, which was the subject of a federal investigation into earmarks granted to its clients by Rep. Jerry Lewis. In June 2006, the firm changed its name to Innovative Federal Strategies following the resignation of the Democratic partners.

Former congressman Bill Lowery, a close friend of Lewis became a partner in 1993.

In 1999, Jeff Shockey, who had worked for Lewis since 1991 left Lewis' employ to join Copeland Lowery, where he would work for the next six years. Shockey's wife, Alexandra Shockey, who had been on Lewis' personal staff since 1992, continued to work for Lewis. (She eventually left Lewis' staff to start a family.)

On January 8, 2003, Letitia White, who had worked for Lewis for 21 years, including as chief of staff, and was known as his "gatekeeper", left Lewis' employ, and government service. She too went to work for Copeland Lowery, registering as a lobbyist on January 9, 2003.

In February 2005, Alexandra Shockey was hired as a subcontractor by Copeland Lowery, taking over some of her husband's clients. Other clients went to White.

In response to a federal investigation begun in May 2006, the firm amended their filings. According to those documents, the firm had "failed to disclose at least $755,000 in income from 17 nonprofit organizations and governmental entities, and $635,000 from 18 other clients between 1998 and 2005."
