= Grassroots lobbying =

Lobbying which asks the general public to contact legislators

Grassroots lobbying, or indirect lobbying, is lobbying with the intention of reaching the legislature and making a difference in the decision-making process. Grassroots lobbying is an approach that separates itself from direct lobbying through the act of asking the general public to contact legislators and government officials concerning the issue at hand, as opposed to conveying the message to the legislators directly. Companies, associations and citizens are increasingly partaking in grassroots lobbying as an attempt to influence a change in legislation.

The unique characteristic of grassroots lobbying, in contrast to other forms of lobbying, is that it involves stimulating the politics of specific communities. This type of lobbying is different from the more commonly known direct lobbying, as it is naturally brought upon by the organization.

== Tactics ==
There are several tactics used by groups in order to promote or advocate different issues politically, but the main two tactics used in grassroots or "outside" advocacy are education of constituents through holding press conferences or organizing press releases, and mobilizing targeted people who will be impacted negatively or positively to create a movement.

=== Media Lobbying ===
Grassroots lobbying often implement the use of media to expand their outreach. Campaigns are developed and are published in all forms of media ranging from television to magazines and internet. Because grassroots lobbying is geared toward local organizations and communities, these types of media outlets are used mainly by large associations that can afford them. Smaller organizations tend to use free media on public television, radio and other smaller outlets. Other forms of free media that make a large impact are things like boycotting, protesting and demonstrations.

==== Social media ====
The trend of the past decade has been the use of social media outlets to reach people across the globe. Social media are by nature grassroots organizers. They provide a way for communities, not only to interact, but to form around topics. Implementing social media tactics in grassroots lobbying would provide a much broader outreach and would allow activists to not only inform but interact with various people about their cause.

Some advocates are now using social media to reduce the cost of traditional campaigns, and to more precisely target public officials with political messages.

An example of the use of social media as a tool of grassroots lobbying is in the Black Lives Matter movement. Social media created platforms for broad discourse that allowed for the information sharing of both policy issues and solutions as well as mobilization. In interviews conducted by Mundt and Ross, social media administrators for BLM groups emphasized the importance of promoting action plans for members on social media to achieve concrete results. These action plans include grassroots lobbying in the form of directly contacting legislators about policy reform.

Another example is Urban Legend, a Virginia-based startup launched in 2020 by former Trump administration staffers that recruited social media influencers including makeup artists, Nascar drivers, home improvement gurus, mommy bloggers, NFL athletes and Olympians.

=== Mass movements ===
By mobilizing the group that the lobby has built, this puts pressure on the legislature to listen and take notice of what concerns they may have. These tactics are used after the lobbying group gains a portion of the publics trust and support through speaking out in crowded areas, passing out flyers and even campaigning through web and television outlets. More recently, due to the potential of other modern communication devices, grassroots lobbying is expected to only increase as a form of shaping public opinion.

In India, examples of successful mass movements include the Mazdoor Kisan Shakti Sangathan's campaign to introduce the 2005 Right to Information Act and Anna Hazare's anti-corruption campaign to introduce the 2011 Lokpal Bill.

==== Tea Party ====
Several grassroots lobbying groups have become popular over time, due to their prominent stances and eye catching tactics to get the publics attention. Most recently in the United States, the Tea Party Movement of 2011 wished to limit government spending. Most of the movements started by the group have to do with less government, tax cutting; something they believe will bring the United States back to what it used to stand for.

Due to the Tea Party's tactics in grassroots, they get their point across and potentially sway the general public on a large scale; indirectly, the Tea Party holds a deal of influence over legislation. This has gone as far as penetrating Congress with candidates personally supported by the Tea Party Movement, thereby giving them a direct outlet for their ideals.

=== Large company campaigns ===
Large companies take advantage of grassroots lobbying as a means of impacting change in legislation. There are certain steps that need to be implemented before the outcome of the lobbying can take place.

- The first step is a 'legislative action program'. This is the role of the management to make the action important in the eyes of the rest of the organization. Not only must they identify specific legislation concerns to the rest of the company, the lobbyists must also perform a type of study identifying the sectors of the public that are being affected.
- The second step is to sensitize the members of the organization to writing, calling or visiting officials and the Member of Congress as soon as an 'alert' is given. This will bring about internal communication with levels of authority.
- Finally, the third step is media planning. There must be use of advertising, posting articles, commercials and TV programming that feature people impacted by the specific cause. These will be geared to those representatives of a Congressional district.

== Trends ==
Trends in the past decade have led to a rise in membership among many grassroots lobbying campaigns. This has been due, in part, to an increase in recruiting of volunteers and starting lobbying campaigns earlier. With the advancement of modern communication techniques, lobbying groups have been able to create interactive web pages to email, recruit volunteers, assign them to tasks and maintain their stated goals. Social media platforms such as Facebook and Twitter, have furthered the ease with which Grassroots lobbyists reach people more directly and develop a strong base for their issues to be heard.

However, there is concern that trends in grassroots lobbying in the digital age could weaken the success of interest groups. An experiment completed by John Cluverius, published in Political Research Quarterly, found that due to the ease and inexpensive nature of emails, legislatures are now untrusting of mass lobbying efforts. Cluverius found that astroturfing and the grassroots movement efforts of interest groups have a negative effect on legislators’ perception of issue salience because their inauthenticity provides no information about constituencies. The research finds that interest groups have more success utilizing grassroots mobilization to influence campaigns and elections rather than policy matter. Concerns about the efficacy of grassroots lobbying were existent before the digital age as well. Legislator are subject to a diverse group of influences, weakening any potential impact of grassroots organization. Fowler and Shaiko found that members of Congress are partial to the stances of their party within their constituency while also balancing policy disputes on focal issues. Their study of the influence of environmentalists on Senate voting found that the general opinion of the lobbyists did not influence the members of Congress, it was their personal partisanship in addition to their policy position that had the most influence. Representatives favored lobbyists within their coalition which hurt the environmentalists in the study who were attempting to appeal to republican Congressmen without being in the party themselves.

== Hot topics for lobbyists ==
The major concerns of the general public do not reflect those of the lobbying groups. This is why the lobbying groups feel that they must use the aforementioned tactics to sway the public a certain way on an issue that they may never knew existed. To the general public, crime is the number one problem in nation, followed by the state of the economy and international affairs. However, the main concern for lobbying groups in the past has been on health concerns. A study done in 2009 shows that over 20 percent of lobbying groups put health concerns such as disease prevention, Medicare, or prescription drugs as a top priority. This interest in health is followed closely by environmental concerns as well. Although Grassroots lobbying has changed the stage of such advocacy, it is still concerning the same issues as other more traditional or direct lobbying.

Grassroots lobbyists typically differ from traditional lobbyists in their funding as well as their ideological goals. Typical lobbying is done on behalf of a corporation with the intentions of swaying legislation in their favor for economic gain. A study by JAMA Internal Medicine found that from 1999-2018 the pharmaceutical and health product industry spent the most money on lobbying and campaign contributions in the US, totaling $4.7 billion. Personal medical expenditures in the US, the costs of prescription drugs, and the efficiency of Medicare remain prominent policy issues. Congress passed a 2019 repeal of taxes in relation to the Affordable Care Act which benefits medical device manufacturers and health insurance companies. While grassroots organizations are concerned about issues like health and medical policy in the US, it is typically from a disadvantages stance.For example, Patients Against Affordable Drugs is an independent organization that promotes the mobilization of Americans against monopoly pricing of pharmaceutical products. Unlike traditional corporations who have the funding to directly influence legislators through campaign donations and partisan financing, interest groups are often nonprofit and rely on outreach efforts to successfully influence policy decisions. Debra Salazar at Western Washington University completed a study comparing mainstream environmental interest groups vs grassroots groups in Washington. The study found that the institutionalized groups were more concerned with political tactics and bureaucratic practices whereas grassroots organizations were primarily concerned with mobilization resources. The study also found that the grassroots groups receive less external funding and reliance on member sponsorship discourages the conservation actions of the group. In grassroots organizations, member participation is the most important factor to achieve outreach goals and to promote conservation in this environmental example.

== Regulations ==
Lobbying and the stimulation of grassroots lobbying, is protected by the First Amendment rights of speech, association, and petition. Federal law does not mandate grassroots lobbying disclosure, yet, 36 states regulate grassroots lobbying. 22 states define lobbying as direct or indirect communication to public officials, and 14 additional states define lobbying as any attempt to influence public officials. A group or individual classified as a lobbyist must submit regular disclosure reports. Reports accurately disclose activities and all financial support, however, reporting requirements vary from state to state. Some states disclosures are minimal and require only registration, while some states disclosure requirements are extensive, including but not limited to: filing of monthly to quarterly expense reports, including all legislative activity relevant to the individual or groups activities, amounts of contributions and donations, as well as the names and addresses of contributors and specified expenses. The grassroots lobbying disclosure law in Washington requires that any person or group that spends more than $500 per month or $1000 in three months from grassroots lobbying expenditures is required to file with the states Public Disclosure Commission and disclose his or hers name/ groups name, business, occupation, and address. Also the names and addresses of anyone or any group the grassroots lobbyists are working with, as well as anyone who contributes more than $25 towards lobbying efforts. Part-time employment or expenses of $500 per month on communications efforts is a common onset for disclosure reports, varying from states. Penalties range from civil fines to criminal penalties if regulations are not complied.

=== IRS ===
Grassroots lobbying is classified under Schedule C (form 990 or 990-EZ), Political Campaign and Lobbying Activities. Schedule C is used by Section 501 (c) and Section 527 organizations. These organizations are required to use Schedule C to provide additional information on political campaign activities and lobbying activities.

== Astroturfing ==
A common misconception about the grassroots style lobbying is that it goes hand in hand with what is known as Astroturf lobbying or Astroturfing. Astroturf-style activism has been deemed by many as "artificial", being because it uses techniques different from the original grassroots style of over-all citizen participation. Unlike genuine grassroots activism which tends to be money-poor but people-rich, astroturf campaigns are typically people-poor but cash-rich. The lobbyists in charge of this type of activism usually come from non-governmental organizations and political public relations firms. Inside these Astroturf organizations are workers hired to rally up people to support a particular cause and instruct them on how to take political action. Many times grassroots organizations have felt interference by these organizations when their efforts are reorganized with an Astroturf –Lobbying approach. Although many don't agree with this form of activism because it somewhat dismisses the general public's involvement, Astroturf lobbying groups defend their position, saying that monitoring the collection of peoples voices would infringe on First Amendment rights.

== See also ==
- Activism
- Advocacy
- Advocacy Evaluation
- Advocacy group
