= Lewis–Lowery lobbying controversy =

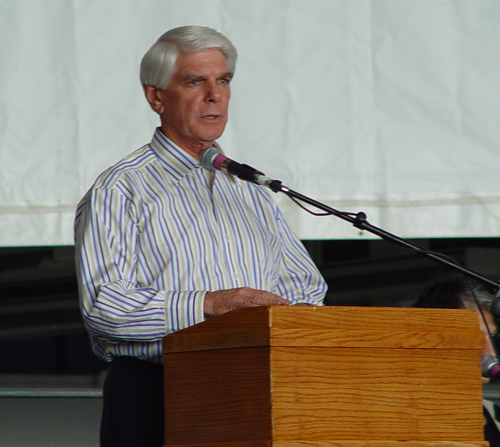
Congressman Jerry Lewis

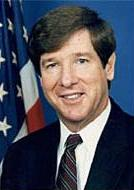
Former Congressman, now partner in lobbying firm, Bill Lowery

The Jerry Lewis – Lowery lobbying firm controversy stems from the relationship between Congressman Jerry Lewis (R-CA) and a lobbying firm, known as Copeland Lowery Jacquez Denton & White, where good friend and former U.S. Congressman Bill Lowery was a partner from 1993 to 2006.

The basic allegations are that Lewis, by virtue of his chairmanship of the House Appropriations Committee (since January 2005), and his prior chairmanship of the Defense Appropriations Subcommittee, was able, through earmarks and other methods, to steer hundreds of millions of dollars to clients of Lowery's firm. Lowery and his firm have earned millions of dollars in fees from these clients. Lowery and others in his firm, in turn, have given hundreds of thousands of dollars to Lewis' campaign committee and political action committee. Defense contractors who are clients of the lobbying firm have also given hundreds of thousands of dollars. Lewis, who has not faced serious opposition in his re-election campaigns in the past ten years, has used his campaign and PAC funds in support of other Republicans, something that helped him become chairman of the House Appropriations Committee.

The Justice department ultimately dropped its investigation into the firm and Mr. Lewis. A spokesman for the department had no further comment.

In addition, two key individuals on Lewis' staff (Letitia White and Jeff Shockey) went to work for Copeland Lowery, earning millions of dollars for themselves; Richard White, Letitia's husband, has seen a steep increase in his income since he switched to being a lobbyist for defense firms; Lewis' stepdaughter has benefited from his ties to the lobbyists; and Jeff Shockey, upon returning to work of Lewis in 2005, was paid two million dollars by Copeland Lowery as "severance", based upon projected revenues of the lobbying firm for the eleven months following his departure.

== Federal investigation ==
No individual has been formally charged with any wrongdoing, but there is now an ongoing federal investigation being run by the U.S. Attorney's office in Los Angeles, and a federal grand jury in Los Angeles has issued at least 10 subpoenas. As of early July 2006, one of Lowery's two ex-wives, Melinda Morrin, has been interviewed twice by the FBI about her ex-husband's dealings.

On June 1, 2006, the San Bernardino Sun reported that the City of Redlands, California and San Bernardino County, California, both clients of Lowery's law firm, had been subpoenaed in the federal investigation into possible lobbying and earmarking abuses by Lowery's firm and Lewis. Four days later it was revealed that two other clients of the law firm, California State University San Bernardino and Riverside County, California, had also been subpoenaed. On June 6, three more California cities, Loma Linda, Yucca Valley, and Twentynine Palms stated that they had been issued subpoenas. On June 14, Highland, California announced it had been issued a subpoena.

On June 28, 2006, an official of ESRI said that the company had also received a federal subpoena as part the ongoing investigation into the ties between Lewis and Copeland Lowery. "We have no concerns," ESRI spokesman Don Berry said. "We retain a lobbyist and it is not an issue for us." On September 5, 2006, the Associated Press reported that federal investigators were looking into a donation of 41 acres (170,000 m^{2}) of land to the city of Redlands by the owners of ESRI in 2001, land adjacent to the home of Lewis.

On December 4, 2010, the New York Times reported that the Justice Department had ended its investigation on the relationship between Mr. Lewis and Copeland Lowery. "The D.O.J. response confirms what I've known from Day 1 — that the facts and the truth of this matter will ultimately prevail," Mr. Lewis said in a statement.

== Chronology ==
=== The early years ===
- From January 1985 to January 1993, Congressmen Jerry Lewis and Bill Lowery served together on the House Appropriations Committee, where they became friends.
- In 1993, Lowery became a lobbyist and partner in a lobbying firm that James Copeland helped found in 1992.
- Since 1993, Lewis and Lowery have celebrated birthdays together, vacationed together and often shared meals at restaurants near their Capitol Hill homes. Lewis was the best man at Lowery's second marriage. Lowery emceed a gala for Lewis in Redlands, California in 2004. Their day-to-day contacts are made convenient by Lowery's special access to Capitol Hill. As a former congressman, he can exercise at the House gym and walk onto the House floor.
- In January 1995, Lewis became chairman of the Veterans Affairs, Housing and Urban Development and Independent Agencies Appropriations subcommittee.

=== Lewis moves up; staff moves out (and back) ===
- In January 1999, Lewis became chairman of the Defense Appropriations Subcommittee, which oversees more discretionary spending than any other congressional subcommittee. That year, Jeff Shockey, who had worked for Lewis since 1991 left Lewis' employ to join Copeland Lowery, where he would work for the next six years. Shockey's wife, Alexandra Shockey, who had been on Lewis' personal staff since 1992, continued to work for Lewis. (She eventually left Lewis' staff to start a family.)
- In 2000, Richard White, the husband, of Letitia White, a key Lewis staffer, stopped lobbying for the Brown & Williamson tobacco company and registered to do defense lobbying.
- On January 8, 2003, Letitia White, who had worked for Lewis for 21 years, including as chief of staff, and was known as his "gatekeeper", left Lewis' employ, and government service. She too went to work for Copeland Lowery, registering as a lobbyist on January 9, 2003.
- In 2003, Lewis became the fundraising chairman for the National Republican Congressional Committee.
- In January 2005, Lewis became chairman of the House Appropriations Committee, which oversees about $900 billion in federal spending each year.
- That same month (January 2005), Jeff Shockey left Copeland Lowery, where he was a partner, to become deputy chief of staff of the committee. He received approximately $2 million from Copeland Lowery as a "separation/buy-out agreement" (see below). After Shockey left Copeland Lowery, the firm changed its name (removing "Shockey"), with White becoming a name partner in the firm.
- Lewis said White is so dedicated to public service that she also asked to rejoin his staff when he became chair of the appropriations committee. But according to Lewis, he said no, because he wanted White, whose husband is in his early 70's, to build some financial security. "I said, 'Letitia, I'm afraid you shouldn't do that,'" Lewis said.
- In February 2005, Alexandra Shockey was hired as a subcontractor by Copeland Lowery, taking over some of her husband's clients. Other clients went to White.
- In February 2005, Julia Willis-Leon, one of Lewis' stepdaughters, became head of a newly registered political action committee, Small Biz Tech PAC. The PAC address was a townhouse half-owned by Letitia White and her husband. During the first 17 months of the PAC's existence, 40% of the $114,000 in revenues for the PAC came the Whites and from small defense contractors represented by Copeland Lowery.

=== The end of Copeland Lowery; the federal investigation begins ===
- On December 23, 2005, the San Diego Union Tribune published a lengthy article on Lewis, Lowery, the Whites, and the Shockeys.
- In late May 2006, the FBI sent a special agent from its office in Riverside, California, to the Cannon House Office Building to retrieve documents as federal prosecutors in Southern California were issuing a series of subpoenas to towns and counties in Lewis' Congressional district, all of which were represented at one time or another in lobbying activities by a current or former Lewis staffer. (See above for details.) The FBI obtained financial disclosure forms from 1999 through 2004 for both Lewis and his wife, Arlene Willis, who is chief of staff for Lewis in his personal office.
- In late May or early June 2006, Lewis hired a high-profile legal team from a Los Angeles-based law firm. The team includes former Solicitor General Ted Olson; Robert Bonner, who once led the U.S. attorney's office in Los Angeles and was once head of Customs and Border Protection; Mel Levine, a former Democratic congressman from California; and Joseph Warin, a former federal prosecutor.
- In June 2006, Copeland Lowery amended 35 prior government filings which reported the firm's lobbying revenues and clients between 1998 and 2005. The firm had failed to disclose at least $755,000 in income from 17 nonprofit organizations and governmental entities, and $635,000 from 18 other clients.
- In June, the firm split into two. Democratic Party partners Copeland and Jacquez formed a firm called CJ Strategies. Republicans Lowery, Denton and White formed a firm called Innovative Federal Strategies.
- In early July, a spokesman said that "The firm is continuing to review its lobbying disclosure forms," and that "The firm is planning to amend the 2003 and 2004 statements involving [San Bernardino County] in the coming days," with underreported income in the hundreds of thousands of dollars.
- By October 2006, according to documents filed with the Federal Election Commission, Lewis had spent about $800,000 of his campaign funds for lawyers.

== The earmarks ==
After Lewis became chairman of the defense appropriations subcommittee in 1999, earmarks in defense bills exploded. "We used to think that Mr. Lewis would be a champion for smart spending," said Keith Ashdown of the watchdog group Taxpayers for Common Sense. "But he brought us the biggest increase in defense earmarking in history." A study by that group found that Lowery's clients have had a remarkable success rate before Lewis' committee. "Hundreds of millions of dollars have gone to this one firm's clients," says Ashdown.

Such earmarks are normally done openly. For example, on November 8, 2005, Lewis' office sent out a press release by email announcing that the congressman had secured $10.75 million in federal funding for a number of recipients, including at least five that are clients of Copeland Lowery.

Lewis has helped secure more than $1 billion for projects across Inland Southern California in recent years. Lewis has aided more than 250 Inland projects with allocations ranging from $81,000 to help move the Big Bear Zoo to nearly $100 million to ESRI, a Redlands mapping company working on reconstruction plans in Iraq. Federal funding has paid for flood-control and transportation projects, community services, and advanced technology for area businesses and agencies. Lewis is credited with bringing tens of millions of federal dollars for cancer research in Loma Linda and helping reverse factors that led to unprecedented fire danger in the San Bernardino National Forest.

=== Brent Wilkes ===
During the 1995-2005 period, some of the two dozen firms in San Diego and Virginia owned by Brent R. Wilkes received about $100 million in federal contracts. Most of Wilkes' government work came from earmarks.

In November 2005, Wilkes was described as "co-conspirator No. 1" in a plea agreement signed by Representative Randy Cunningham, a California Republican on the House Appropriations Committee. In the plea deal, Cunningham admitted accepting more than $2.4 million in cash and gifts from Wilkes and other contractors.

Since 1993, Lewis has received $88,000 in contributions from Wilkes and his associates. Lewis has subsequently given $56,000 of that to Habitat for Humanity. Wilkes paid Lowery's firm $160,000 in fees, according to original filings by Copeland Lowery. In fact, those fees were substantially underreported: the firm's fees had increased to $25,000 a month by 2005, and total fees were underreported by at least $225,000.

In an August 2006 interview, Wilkes said he considered dropping the firm, but that Lowery threatened to block future projects if their relationship ended. Wilkes said Lowery had warned several times that doing so could prompt Lewis to cut off earmarks, saying, "You don't want me telling those guys on the committee that you are moving on without me." That meant, Wilkes said, "I'd be out of business."

Wilkes described the system bluntly: "Lowery would always say, 'It is a two-part deal,'" he recalled. "'Jerry will make the request. Jerry will carry the vote. Jerry will have plenty of time for this. If you don't want to make the contributions, chair the fund-raising event, you will get left behind.'" Barbara Comstock, a spokeswoman for Lewis, said the congressman was unaware of any conversations like those Wilkes described having with Lowery.

In 1998, Lewis traveled to the Poway, California, offices of one of those firms, ADCS, shortly before it received one of its first major government contracts. He met with executives and got a briefing on the company, which was formed a few years earlier and sought government contracts to convert paper records to electronic format, including a project in the Panama Canal Zone. In February 1999, Wilkes met with Shockey, then a Lewis aide, to ask the Lewis's office to intervene on a project paid through the Department of Veterans Affairs (VA). On April 15, 1999, three months after Lewis was named chairman of the House defense appropriations subcommittee, he received $17,000 in campaign contributions from Wilkes and his associates. Around that time, when a VA accounting officer complained about questions from a congressman on ADCS's behalf, a Wilkes aide, Mike Williams, wrote back that Lewis was "a close personal friend of Brent's." The letter offered to "have the congressman's office contact the V.A. to put this issue to rest."

In early 2006, Lewis has said that he barely knew Wilkes and that he did not remember seeing him in nearly a decade. But Wilkes says their relationship was closer than that. Ever since they went on a scuba-diving trip together in 1993, he said, Lewis had referred to him as his "diving buddy." They occasionally dined together or met at political functions, Wilkes said. At a Las Vegas fund-raiser in April 2005, Wilkes said, Lewis greeted him as "Brento" and hugged him as Wilkes surprised Lewis with $25,000 in campaign contributions.

=== Other companies that benefited from earmarks ===
The following are some of the other companies that paid Copeland Lowery for lobbying services and received earmarked government contracts.

- Redlands-based mapping company Environmental Systems Research Institute (ESRI). Between 2001 and 2006, Lewis earmarked more than $90 million for ESRI projects that included defense intelligence systems such as database mapping to assist in rebuilding war-torn Iraq. Work included such efforts as building software that assesses the fire danger of the San Bernardino Mountains, helping move troops in the Iraq war, and assisting in reconstruction after Hurricane Katrina. From 1998 to 2003, the company also received another $60 million in defense contracts outside of those earmarks. ESRI has paid Lowery's firm $320,000 since 1998. Jack Dangermond, the president and founder of ESRI, and his wife, Laura, have consistently been two of the top individual contributors to Lewis' campaign fund, giving a combined $13,900 between 2000 and 2005. The couple has donated a combined $32,900 to the campaign fund and Lewis' PAC since the 2000 election cycle. In late June, ESRI became "the first private company reported to be subpoenaed by investigators from the U.S Attorney's Office in Los Angeles." On September 5, 2006, the Associated Press reported that federal investigators were looking into a donation of 41 acres (170,000 m^{2}) of land to the city of Redlands by the owners of ESRI in 2001, land adjacent to the home of Lewis.
- Lewis fought for a decade on behalf of San Diego, California contractor General Atomics, forcing the Pentagon to spend hundreds of millions of dollars on GA's Predator UAV, which the generals didn't want. In return, General Atomics donated generously to Lewis' campaign and PAC, and hosted at least one fundraiser for Lewis. In April 2002, General Atomics paid for White and her husband to take a 10-day, all-expenses-paid trip to Italy, at a reported cost of nearly $8,500. In January 2003, White became a lobbyist for the company, one day after Lewis' employ. In May 2003, the company paid for Lewis and his wife to go on a trip to New York City. In the three years (2003–2005) after White became a lobbyist, GA paid Copeland Lowery over $300,000. General Atomics has given $15,000 to Lewis' campaign and PAC in recent years. In October 2004, Lewis and now-convicted Representative Duke Cunningham, Representative Duncan Hunter, had a joint fund-raiser at the company's San Diego headquarters.
- Isothermal Systems and Tessera Technologies partnered on a defense project that received $4.5 million in earmarks over 2003 and 2004. Isothermal had Letitia White as a lobbyist; Tessera had her husband, Richard. Tessera paid Richard White $300,000 in fees between 2003 and 2005.
- Orincon, a defense contractor now owned by Lockheed Martin, grew slowly after it was founded in the mid-1970s by former UCSD professor Daniel Alspach. In the late 1990s, after it signed on with Lowery's firm, the company's growth curve turned sharply upward: sales went from about $10 million per year to $52 million in 2003, when it was sold. In April 1999, Lewis, Lowery, White, and White's husband traveled to San Diego at the company's expense; the purpose was a tour of the company's headquarters. The group stayed two nights at one of La Jolla's most prestigious resort hotels; Lewis' suite cost $700 a night.

Orincon paid $720,000 to Copeland Lowery between 1998 and 2003. Alspach and his Orincon colleagues gave at least $47,000 to Lewis' political action committee between 2001 and 2003; Lewis' PAC and his campaign got at least $102,000 between 1998 and 2003.

- Virginia-based Trident provides hardware and software systems to military and commercial clients. It was founded in 1985 but grew slowly until 2003. 2005 revenues were about $30 million; as of 2006, nearly 90 percent of the company's revenue came from federal contracts. Between 2002 and 2006 Trident received at least $23.6 million in defense-related earmarks inserted into appropriations bills that Lewis supervised. In April 2003, three months after White began representing the firm, $8.4 million for Trident was earmarked into an emergency spending bill for the Iraq war. In addition, Trident had been a beneficiary of Lewis-backed funds to support small-business contracts with the Defense Department: the company has received tens of millions in grants from the Small Business Innovation Research Program since 2002, including five in 2005 and at least one in 2006, for $9.62-million.

In the first three years that White represented Trident, her firm billed the company $340,000. In the 2000-02 election cycle, Nicholas Karangelen, Trident's owner, gave just $15,500 in campaign contributions. But in the 2004-2006 period, he contributed $104,000. The biggest individual recipient was Jerry Lewis, whose PAC and campaign fund received $72,000 from Karangelen and Karangelen's wife.

Until 2006, Trident conducted no business in Lewis' district or anywhere in the state of California. In June 2006 the company opened a development center in an office building in Redlands, the home town of Lewis.

=== Local governments, colleges, hospitals, and other agencies that benefited from earmarks ===
From 1998 through 2005, non-profit hospitals, state and local governments and other agencies paid Copeland Lowery at least $13.5 million for federal lobbying.; Many, if not most of these were in the Inland Empire (central and southern California), within or near the district that Lewis represents. The agencies paid the fees because they felt it would help them get federal money from a congressman whose door was already - in theory - open to them.

The following are some of those organizations and some of the earmarked government funding they received:

- Dr. Clifford Young, who oversees federal relations for California State University San Bernardino, estimates that the school has received $60 million to $70 million for earmarked projects since it retained Copeland Lowery in late 1999. Since hiring the firm, the university has paid the firm about $490,000, according to disclosure reports initially filed by Copeland Lowery; university records showed $702,500 paid. As the earmarks started arriving, Young began receiving calls from other universities and from town and county governments across the Inland Empire of central and southern California. "They were asking, 'Who are you using (in Washington)? What are they doing for you? How are they doing it for you?' I get a lot of those calls."
- Loma Linda University's medical center got millions of dollars earmarked into NASA's budget for research projects. Since 1988, the small Seventh-day Adventist school has received more than $160 million in earmarks. Some Lewis staffers call it "Loma Lewis University". Between 1998 and 2004, the medical center paid Copeland Lowery $440,000 in fees. A 2001 study found that the school had received $150.6 million in earmarks since 1988. That placed the school, with an enrollment of 3,000, among the nation's top 10 academic recipients of earmarked federal money.
- In a 1999 meeting of the Redlands, California city council, Councilman Kasey Haws urged that the Copeland Lowery be hired because "it is expected that (the cost) will be returned many times over in federal funds received." The initial contract in January 2000 was for $30,000. One year later, the city reported that more than $6 million in federal funding had been dedicated to local interests, including San Timoteo Creek, the Redlands Trolley, a regional crime mapping and analysis project hosted by the police department, and the Redlands Community Center. The city has continued to pay the firm $30,000 per year. (The Center for Public Integrity's database shows "less than $10,000" in fees paid for both 2003 and 2004; the difference was presumably part of the underreporting that was identified in June 2006.) In all, the city estimated that Copeland Lowery helped Redlands secure at least $36.7 million in federal money in six years.
- Riverside County initially paid the firm $30,000 each month, beginning in 1999, but later reduced that amount $15,000. (The Center for Public Integrity shows only $120,000 in fees - $10,000 per month - for 2004, and 2003 is also below $15,000 per month.; the difference was presumably part of the underreporting that was identified in June 2006.)
- San Bernardino City Councilwoman Susan Longville told the local Sun newspaper about her gratitude for more than $1 million in Environmental Protection Agency funds that Lewis earmarked to create a lake. "It has been the generous earmarks that Congressman Lewis has provided for us that has allowed us not to dip into the general fund or redevelopment fund," she said. Since 1998, Copeland Lowery has charged the San Bernardino Valley Municipal Water District $160,000 in fees.
- The county museum of San Bernardino County received more than $1 million for a Hall of Paleontology and a heritage center. The county also got $50,000 earmarked for a wading pool. The county hired Copeland Lowery in late 2002 at the monthly rate of $12,500. In mid-2006, the county was paying $16,500 per month to the firm.; the increase came around January 2005, when Lewis became head of the House Appropriations Committee. in all, between late 2002, when it initially signed a contract, and May 2006, the county paid the firm over $565,000 in fees and expenses. (The Center for Public Integrity shows only $60,000 in fees in 2004 and "less than $10,000" for 2003.; the difference was presumably part of the underreporting that was identified in June 2006.)
- The city of San Diego paid Copeland Lowery $960,000 to seek federal funding for transportation, sewage treatment, summer youth employment and other projects between 1998 and 2002. A number of projects were funded.
- Since 2002, the San Diego State University Foundation and Loma Linda University have used a series of earmarks in the Department of Navy budget to form the Center for the Commercialization of Advanced Technology, which operates out of both schools and tries to find nonmilitary markets for new technologies. The foundation pays about $200,000 a year to Copeland Lowery for its lobbying services.
- Lewis helped the University of Redlands secure $4 million for endangered species research, $7.5 million for Salton Sea research and $10 million for a new science center. The school named one of the buildings in the science center after Lewis. From 1999 through the end of 2005, the school paid Copeland Lowery $680,000 in lobbying fees.
- The town of Yucca Valley has had a contract with Copeland Lowery since January 2003. The town initially paid $3,000 per month plus expenses; that was increased in August 2005 to $3,500. (The Center for Public Integrity shows "less than $10,000" in fees for both 2003 and 2004.; the difference was presumably part of the underreporting that was identified in June 2006.) Since contracting with Copeland Lowery, the town has received nearly $4.4 million in federal funds, with money going toward road improvements, better flood control and two solar projects for municipal buildings. The firm lobbies not only Lewis, but also California's two U.S. senators and others who may have a role in issues of concern, Town Manager Andy Takata said. "We felt they have done a good job for us," Takata said. "Jerry Lewis has been a very good Congressman for us all these years." That was true long before the town hired Copeland Lowery, he said.

Lewis spokesman Jim Specht said the congressman has never recommended to anybody that they need a lobbyist to speak with him. "Many members of city councils, mayors and even city staff call our office all the time," Specht said.

== Benefits to Lewis ==
=== Campaign contributions from lobbyists and their clients ===
For Lewis, the relationship with Lowery has eased the burden of fundraising, which he calls "the last thing I want to do with my time."

Many of Lowery's defense-contractor clients also contribute to Lewis as part of their lobbying strategy. In total, Lowery's lobbying firm and its clients contributed $480,000 to Lewis' political action committee in the 2000-2005 period, 37 percent of the $1.3 million raised by PAC during those six years. Since 1997, Lewis has received more than $917,000 from Copeland Lowery lobbyists and their for-profit clients.

Lowery, his partners, and their spouses have contributed $135,000 to Lewis' campaigns and political action committee over the past decade, routinely giving the maximum allowed by law. Lowery also had organized and hosted Lewis fundraisers.

- Since 2003, the Whites have given $30,000 to Lewis campaigns and his PAC. They also gave $40,000 to the National Republican Congressional Committee and thousands more to PACs established to retain Republican control of the House.
- Between 1999 and 2005, the Shockeys contributed more than $170,000 of their income to Republican causes, including $40,000 to Lewis.

In all, between 1997 and 2005, Copeland Lowery's for-profit clients made $48.2 million in political contributions to nearly 1,300 federal candidates and committees. At least $6.2 million went to the campaigns and political action committees of House Appropriations Committee members, including Lewis. Slightly over $1 million of that $6.2 million went to the members' political action committees. Lewis' Future Leaders PAC got about $520,000 of that $1 million. It is legal for lobbyists to direct companies to make contributions, as long as they are not given in exchange for official, specific action by members of Congress.

==== Campaign contributions used for re-election campaigns ====
Lewis was originally elected to the U.S. House in 1978 with 61 percent of the vote. Between 1980 and 1998, he received at least 60 percent of the vote at each election.

Since the 1998 election, Lewis has collected more than three-quarters of million dollars in campaign funds in each two-year election cycle. He has not needed this money to win re-election:

- In 2000 he won with 80 percent of the vote, running against two minor party candidates who reported no campaign expenditures.

In 2002, he won with 67 percent; his Democratic opponent reported no campaign spending. Lewis had $1.1 million in his campaign fund after the election.

- In 2004 he again had no Democratic opponent in the general election.

==== Campaign contributions used for other Republicans ====
What the campaign contributions have done for Lewis is to provide him influence with other Republicans. Lewis said he lost his chairmanship of the Republican Conference, then the No. 3 post in the House Republican hierarchy, in January 1993 partially because of weak fundraising.

In the 2000 election cycle, Lewis gave $350,000 from his campaign and PAC to other candidates; in the 2002 cycle he gave $475,000; and in the 2004 cycle he gave $530,000. These figures do not include money to party committees. For example, in 2004, Lewis's campaign had $1.56 million in total receipts, and he gave the Republican leadership $650,000 in excess campaign funds to help maintain Republican control of the House.

==== Winning the position of Chairman of the House Appropriations Committee ====
The money that Lewis gave to other Republicans was part of his successful effort to win their backing for his becoming chairman of the House Appropriations Committee in 2005. He acknowledges that fundraising "played a very significant role" in winning the post.

In 2003 and 2004, Lewis, then chairman of the defense appropriations subcommittee, was in a fierce competition for the chairmanship. The Republican leadership had begun assigning chairmanships in part based on how much campaign money a member had raised for other members. Mr. Lewis and his rivals for the post, Representatives Ralph Regula of Ohio and Harold Rogers of Kentucky, each began a fund-raising blitz. And each concentrated on the industry that had benefited from spending appropriated by their subcommittee, which in Mr. Lewis's case was defense.

White, at Copeland Lowery, organized a steady stream of fund-raisers for Lewis and other Republicans. "We'd get e-mails from her asking us to go to her events about once a week," an in-house lobbyist for a major defense firm recalled. "We all kind of laughed about it. But everyone in town noticed how active she was." Lewis raised more than $800,000 for his political action committee in the 2004 election cycle and got the chairmanship, although Regula was more senior.

Lewis called his selection be Chairman "the highlight of my career in public affairs", and said:

We have a historic opportunity and a unique responsibility to reform the appropriations process and change the culture of the committee. I intend to lead a committee that is dedicated to fiscal restraint and committed to being an integral part of our Republican leadership's effort to rein in spending and balance the federal budget.

=== Improved neighborhood ===
On September 5, 2006, the Associated Press reported that federal investigators were looking into a donation of 41 acres (170,000 m^{2}) of land to the city of Redlands by Jack Dangermond, the president and founder of ESRI, and his wife, Laura. The land, worth more than $2 million, was donated in September 2001, about six months after the Dangermonds bought it. The donation required the city to agree to keep the property as open space or parkland. The land, some of which sits directly across from Lewis' home, is part of a scenic canyon in one of Redlands' wealthiest neighborhoods. Keeping the land free of development helps ensure property values remain high.

ESRI had hired Copeland Lowery in 2000, the year before the purchase and donation. In 2002, the year after the donation, the defense appropriations subcommittee, which Lewis chaired, provided a $15 million earmark for the National Imagery and Mapping Agency to acquire software from ESRI.

The Dangermonds said in a statement that they didn't know Lewis lived in the neighborhood when they decided to buy the land and donate it. A spokeswoman for Lewis' attorneys said the congressman was unaware the Dangermonds owned the land and did not know the terms under which it was given to the city.

=== Lewis' stepdaughter ===
Julia Willis-Leon is the daughter of Arlene Willis, who is Lewis' wife and his chief of staff. Before they were married, Arlene Willis was her husband's top aide when he came to Capitol Hill in 1979. Lewis and Willis have four children of their own and three children from prior marriages; Julia Willis-Leon is one of those three.

==== Small Biz Tech PAC ====
Willis-Leon is the director of the Small Biz Tech PAC. The PAC took in about $113,700 between February 2005, when it registered, and June 2006. Of that, more than $42,000 was used to pay the salary and expenses of Willis-Leon. (Willis-Leon has disputed the amount of her compensation — which was calculated from government records by OpenSecrets, a political watchdog group — but would not say what the correct amount was). Of the $113,700 in revenues, $46,000 came from Letitia White, her husband Richard, and small defense contractors represented by Copeland Lowery.

In March 2005, the PAC sponsored a luncheon for Lewis As of June 2006, the PAC had given $15,600 to candidates or other PACs.

The address that the PAC used when it registered in 2005, and the address listed on its website (as of early June 2006) is a three-story, million-dollar Capitol Hill townhouse. Willis-Leon said she works from her home in Las Vegas, that the PAC used the townhouse address only in its initial stages, and that it maintains no office there. FEC records indeed show that the Capitol Hill address was the organization address in their initial filing of February 3, 2005, and an amended filing later showed a different address. Nevertheless, a year later, the web site still showed the Capital Hill address

The townhouse was purchased in December 2003 by Letitia White and one of White's clients, Trident Systems founder and president Nicholas Karangelen, and their spouses. Karangelen also has the position of chairman of the board of the PAC. Karangelen has described the house as an investment property. Friends of White say she sometimes stays in the town house and uses it for fund-raisers and events related to her lobbying business.

Patrick Dorton, a spokesman for Copeland, Lowery, declined comment on the Small Biz Tech PAC and characterized the townhouse purchase as a private matter. "It was not connected in any way to any fee arrangement or any work for Trident," he said.

==== "Strategic partner" of another lobbyist ====
Willis-Leon, who lives in Las Vegas, is a "strategic partner" of the lobbying firm of Potomac Partners DC LLC, President Richard Alcalde said in an interview in June 2006. Alcalde said he has paid Willis-Leon $40,000 to $50,000 over the last year for advice on several clients. Six of Alcalde's thirteen clients have business before the Appropriations Committee, according to reports of his lobbying activity.

==== Work prior to the PAC and Potomac partners ====
Willis-Leon's lawyer said that his client has a background in event planning and met Alcalde, as well as leaders of the Small Biz Tech PAC, through contacts that included Letitia White. The lawyer said that Willis-Leon had also worked part-time for General Atomics as well as for groups representing alternative fuel users and charter schools, before she met Alcalde. It is known that she was a wedding planner.

== Benefits to the lobbyists ==
=== The firm ===
From 1998 to 2004, the annual revenues of Copeland Lowery more than tripled, from $1.58 million to $5.11 million, according to the Center for Public Integrity. In 1998, the firm had 28 clients; as of December 2005, it had 101.

In 2005, Copeland Lowery reported income of $7.4 million, ranking it one of Washington's top 50 lobbying firms. In the second half of 2005, it ranked number 32 nationwide. As of mid-2006, prior to its disbanding, the firm had five partners (James Copeland, Lowery, Lynn Jacquez, White, and Jean Denton) and 14 other employees.

Copeland Lowery had no written partnership agreement and functioned under an "eat what you kill" arrangement. Its partners kept the revenue they collected from their clients less overhead costs, which were divided among them based on the percentage of total firm revenue that each of them brought in. Overhead costs in 2004 were about 18 percent.

=== Lowery ===
Lowery earned about $850,000 in 1997. In 2003, he earned just under $2 million. The growth of his firm made Lowery a very wealthy man. He now owns two homes - a townhouse on Capitol Hill and a 14.3-acre (58,000 m^{2}) property in King William County, Va.

In 2003, Lowery received part of the proceeds of the sale of Orincon, a defense firm that was a client of Copeland Lowery, when that company was purchased by Lockheed Martin. Lowery had been on the board of directors of Orincon, and owned several thousand shares of the company's stock.

=== Letitia White ===
White, 48, joined Lewis' staff as a receptionist and rose to become his top aide on defense issues. White was able to begin lobbying Lewis' committee, and Lewis, in January 2003, immediately after she left his employ, despite a federal law that bars certain "senior staff" from such lobbying for one year after they leave. White's salary - $112,420 - was $80 less than the threshold of $112,500 (75 percent of a House members' salary, which was $150,000 at the time) that defined "senior staff".

White was paid $122,536 in 2001. Exactly when White took a pay cut is unclear, how her pay was cut, and why, is unclear. By one report, she received an $11,000 pay cut shortly before she left. Another report said that her salary decreased in February 2002, but also quoted a spokesman as saying that the main difference in pay between the years was because she got a bonus in 2001 but not 2002.

At Copeland Lowery, White quickly acquired a client roster of two dozen defense firms for which she sought earmarks and other special treatment. Indeed, the day after leaving the Hill, White signed up a major client, General Atomics, along with one of its aeronautics subsidiaries. The companies received several multimillion-dollar earmarks that year in the defense spending bill for the 2004 fiscal year. In 2003 her clients reported paying her lobbying fees totaling $850,000; in 2004 she brought in $1.44 million; in 2005, it was more than $3.5 million Nearly all the firms were defense contractors, according to records at politicalmoneyline.com. If White was a partner during those three years, she would have been paid $4–5 million for her work during the period.

In addition, according to the former chief financial officer of Trident (a company that is client of Copeland Lowery), the owner of Trident (Nicholas Karangelen) had an arrangement with White where she would get a bonus based on the company's profitability. The former executive said she and two other company officials were fired after they questioned the company's financial relationship with White.

At the request of Copley News Service, budget watchdog Keith Ashdown examined appropriations bills to see how White's clients had fared. Ashdown said he was astonished at her success in getting earmarks. The overall success rate for earmark requests submitted to Congress is 1 in 4, Ashdown said. In baseball terms that's a .250 average. "Letitia White is hitting about .600 or .700," Ashdown said. "She might be the lobbyist batting champion. If I were looking for an earmark, I'd hire her in a heartbeat." "Special interests want to buy influence," he said. "People know that if you keep Letitia White happy, you keep Jerry Lewis happy."

For the fiscal year 2006 federal budget, Ashdown identified more than $230 million of earmarks benefiting more than two-thirds of White's 53 clients in 2005. The earmarks have financed projects such as machine cognition research in Florida and ammunition manufacturing in Kansas.

=== Richard White ===
In 2000, Richard White, Letitia's husband, began lobbying for "defense spending items". He continued to work from home, as he had when he was a tobacco lobbyist. Rather than being paid directly by defense contractors and other clients, he was paid by another lobbying firm, R.C. Whitner & Associates, whose principal and sole lobbyist is Richard Whitner. From 2000 to 2005, White received $205,000 from the group. It's not clear which of the Whitner's clients White was working for, so it is impossible to tell if any got earmarks or other support from Lewis. Further, Whitner did not register as a lobbyist starting in 2002, so the clients that White was lobbying for (via Whitner) are totally unknown.

In 2003, Richard White began getting defense contractors directly as clients, without going through Whitner, for whose clients he continued to work. In 2005, he reported having six defense clients and receiving $280,000 in fees.

=== Jeff Shockey ===
During 1999–2004, while working at Copeland Lowery, Jeff Shockey helped win at least $150 million in earmarks and government funding for clients of the firm, according to Taxpayers for Common Sense. In 2004, clients represented by Shockey, one of Copeland Lowery's named partners, provided 33 percent of the firm's revenue. For 2005, after Shockey had left the firm (in January) to become deputy chief of staff of the House Appropriations Committee, his former clients paid 39 percent of the firm's $7.4 million in revenue.

When Shockey left the firm in January 2005 to return to work for Lewis, he accepted a salary of just under $160,000. That put him among the best-paid congressional employees, but it was a big reduction from the $1.5 million he earned at Copeland Lowery in 2003, and the $2.0 million in 2004.

Shockey, however, did not have to live on a government salary in 2005. In late 2004, just before leaving the firm, he received about $600,000 from the firm; he also got two more payments in 2005, while a government employee, for a total of $1.96 million. According to Shockey's financial disclosure form that was filed in June 2006, the payments were part of a "separation/buy out" agreement for "ownership in and undistributed profits" from the firm. Shockey's lawyers said that they sent a letter to the House ethics committee in April 2005, in what they said was an effort to make sure the severance payments made to Shockey were "appropriate." His attorneys said that the partisan fight that effectively shut down the ethics panel for eighteen months may have played role in explaining why they never received a follow-up letter from the committee giving its approval of the arrangement.

On June 9, 2006, attorneys for Shockey said that the $1.96 million was based on a projection by the firm that Shockey would have billed clients for $3 million in 2005 if he had remained a lobbyist, a 76 percent increase from the $1.7 million in his billings in 2004. According to Roll Call, the jump in revenue wasn't because Shockey was expected to bring in more clients—it jumped because the clients he already had were projected to pay more, sometimes a lot more, for his services. In other words, Shockey was worth a lot more to his clients on the Hill than on K Street, where Copeland Lowery is located.

Shockey is not barred from doing work related to his own former clients (assuming they are being represented someone other than his wife, a lobbyist), but Lewis spokesman John Scofield said that Shockey nonetheless informally recuses himself from such activity.

=== Alexandra Shockey ===
In 2002 and 2004, Alexandra Shockey, who had left Lewis' employ to raise a family, reported her occupation as "homemaker" when she made contributions to the campaigns of Representative Mary Bono and President George W. Bush. For another donation in 2004, she listed her occupation as "retired".

In February 2005, just weeks after her husband left Copeland Lowery to rejoin the Appropriations Committee, she apparently went back to work. She registered Copeland Lowery as a client for her lobbying firm, called Hillscape Associates, becoming a subcontractor to Copeland Lowery. Hillscape's address on federal disclosure forms is identical to that of the Lowery firm.

Jeff Shockey's disclosure forms and lobbying records show that Letitia White took over at least 19 of Shockey's local clients after he left the firm. According to Lewis' spokesman, Jim Specht, Alexandra Shockey, as a subcontractor, was the one actually handling some of her husband's Inland Empire clients. One of those was the city of Redlands, California, whose records have been subpoenaed.

Hillscape initially reported receiving less than $20,000 in lobbying fees from Copeland Lowery and another client during the first half of 2005, according to disclosure reports filed in 2005. Hillscape filed amended disclosure reports in February 2006, less than two months after the first Lewis-Lowery story appeared in newspapers, that showed the company was paid $80,000 by Copeland Lowery from January 1 to June 30, 2005, plus another $40,000 by a second client, itself a California-based lobbying firm.

The April 2005 letter that Jeff Shockey's lawyers sent to the House ethics committee concerning his severance agreement also covered the issue of Shockey's relationship to his wife. "This letter also asks the Committee to confirm that steps Mr. Shockey has taken to avoid any appearance of conflict of interest with his wife's government relations consulting business are sufficient to satisfy applicable House rules". The letter also said that "Mrs. Shockey may represent clients before the Appropriations Committee from time to time, but she and Mr. Shockey have agreed that she will not appear before or seek any official action from him on behalf of a client," the lawyers also wrote.

Attorney William Oldaker - also an earmark specialist who has served as treasurer for several political action committees - said that the couple sought his legal advice in 2005 about their working arrangement and he assured them they were complying with House ethics rules "in letter and spirit." In May 2005, Congressman Lewis sent a letter to the House Ethics Committee, which Oldaker said he drafted, stating that "When I hired Mr. Shockey, I directed him, the Committee's other majority staff members, and my personal staff as follows: that Mr. Shockey will not take any action or otherwise involve himself in any matter in which his spouse is representing a client." The letter also said "This includes asking his colleagues to meet with his spouse or her clients on any matter in which she is representing them."

== Benefits to Congressional staff, and other Congressional PACs ==
Lowery has cultivated relationships with the House Appropriations committee staff and with the staffs of some Representatives on that committee. For example, when the committee worked late one night to meet a legislative deadline, he sent the staff about $300 worth of sandwiches. The House Appropriations committee staff, meanwhile, has invited Lowery to birthday parties, going-away parties and baby showers. Over the years Lowery has become an active member of what Lewis calls "the Lewis family."

Lowery also contributed significant amounts to Congressional PACs. All told, between 1997 and 2006, Lowery and his clients gave Cunningham's political campaign committees $459,000 and Lewis's committees $917,000.

== Lewis and Lowery statements on the controversy ==
- Lewis on his actions: "I have never recommended a lobbyist to any constituent, contractor or anyone seeking federal funds. I have absolutely never told anyone to provide 'stock options' or any other sort of compensation to someone who is their advisor or lobbyist. To do so would be extremely unethical, and it goes entirely against all of my principles of good governing." "It is outrageous and false to suggest that I might have supported a program in order to provide some illicit benefit for a friend."
- Lewis on the FBI investigation:' "I encourage a thorough review of any project I have helped secure for my constituents. I am sure they all meet the highest standards of public benefit." "Throughout my career, I have also made every effort to meet the highest ethical standards, and I am absolutely certain that any review of my work will confirm this."
- Copeland Lowery on their work: "Like many other firms, we work on routine bread-and-butter, run-of-the-mill appropriations that benefit cities and towns and hospitals and schools across the country. Our work is consistent with the laws, rules and regulations that govern Capitol Hill lobbying and is similar to work done every day, every month and every year by many in Washington." (Patrick Dorton, a spokesman for the Copeland Lowery Jacquez Denton and White lobbying firm, in a statement to NBC News.)
- Lewis on government employees who become lobbyists: Lewis views Jeff Shockey's decision to rejoin the House Appropriations committee staff not as another turn of Washington's revolving door, but as proof of the idealism he says is characteristic of the Shockeys, the Whites and Bill Lowery. "I'm very proud of the fact that these people basically are motivated by ... public service," Lewis said. "They didn't come to Washington to get rich. Instead, they came to Washington because they actually wanted to serve.

== Split-up of Copeland Lowery ==
In mid-June 2006, the two Democratic partners, James M. Copeland and Lynnette R. Jacquez, of the firm Copeland Lowery Jacquez Denton & White, told their Republican partners that they were leaving the firm. The reason, they said, was that ethical and legal questions surrounding Lowery and the firm threatened to destroy their professional reputations and ruin their commercial prospects.

Copeland Lowery said in a written statement that "Partners Bill Lowery, Jean Denton, and Letitia White will continue to lead the existing full service consulting firm, while partners James M. Copeland and Lynn Jacquez will form a separate partnership." The Democrats and the Republicans in the firm were already operating separately for the most part: The Republicans worked on the eighth floor of the downtown District of Columbia building they occupy, and the Democrats worked on the fifth floor.

In June, Copeland and Jacquez formed a firm called CJ Strategies. Lowery, Denton and White formed a firm called Innovative Federal Strategies.
