= Jeff Shockey =

American lobbyist

Jeffrey Shockey is an American lobbyist and former congressional staffer. He worked for Republican Representative Jerry Lewis until 1999. In 2011, he founded the lobbying firm of Shockey Scofield Solutions with John Scofield. In 2014, Shockey was appointed as staff director of the House Intelligence Committee under incoming Chairman Devin Nunes. In 2016, Shockey became vice president of federal legislative affairs for Boeing.

== Biography ==
Shockey received a Bachelor of Arts in Political Science in 1988, and an MPA in 1994 from California State San Bernardino. He then received a congressional appointment to become deputy staff director for the House Appropriations Committee. Shockey spent six years as a partner in the Washington, D.C.–based law firm of Copeland, Lowery, Jacquez, Denton & Shockey. He served on Congressman Jerry Lewis's personal office staff as legislative assistant, legislative director and appropriations associate from 1991 to 1999.

== See also ==
- Jerry Lewis – Lowery lobbying firm controversy
