= Lobbying =

Efforts to affect public policy through direct government contact

Lobbying is a form of advocacy that legally attempts to influence policy decisions made by legislators, members of regulatory agencies in the executive branch, or in some cases judges. Lobbying, the main and most well known component of government relations on the other hand, consists of "directly advocating for or against particular legislation or regulations."

The work of advocates and lobbyists generally include activities that require direct contact with lawmakers, policymakers, or their staff; most often professional lobbyists require entry in a lobby register as a registered lobbyist, while most other advocates do not. Although the profession of government relations, as well as the public affairs industry, are not exclusive to lobbyists, it also includes advocates and non-lobbyist government relations professionals that assist lobbyists or other influence efforts but are not legally classified as such. A principal is a person or organization that hires a lobbyist, or is a senior member of an organization or advocacy group that is advocating on behalf of itself or coordinates constituent meetings with lawmakers on behalf of interested individuals from the general public.

== History ==
In pre-modern political systems, royal courts provided incidental opportunities for gaining the ear of monarchs and their councilors.

Historian William Dalrymple writes that corporate lobbying may have been invented by the British East India Company, which heavily influenced the English and British Parliaments and whose finances were important to the England and the United Kingdom.

== Etymology ==
That architectural sense of lobby is believed to originate from the medieval Latin lobia or lobium, which refers to a gallery, hall, or portico. This architectural sense was later adopted to describe the practice of advocating or debating in such spaces.

In a report carried by the BBC, an OED lexicographer has shown that "lobbying" finds its roots in the gathering of Members of Parliament and peers in the hallways ("lobbies") of the United Kingdom Houses of Parliament before and after parliamentary debates where members of the public can meet their representatives.

One story held that the term originated at the Willard Hotel in Washington, D.C., where it was supposedly used by President Ulysses S. Grant to describe the political advocates who frequented the hotel's lobby to access Grant—who was often there in the evenings to enjoy a cigar and brandy—and then tried to buy the president drinks in an attempt to influence his political decisions. Although the term may have gained more widespread currency in Washington, D.C., by virtue of this practice during the Grant Administration, the OED cites numerous documented uses of the word well before Grant's presidency, including use in Pennsylvania as early as 1808.

The term "lobbying" also appeared in print as early as 1820:

Other letters from Washington affirm, that members of the Senate, when the compromise question was to be taken in the House, were not only "lobbying about the Representatives' Chamber" but also active in endeavoring to intimidate certain weak representatives by insulting threats to dissolve the Union.

— April 1, 1820

== Overview ==
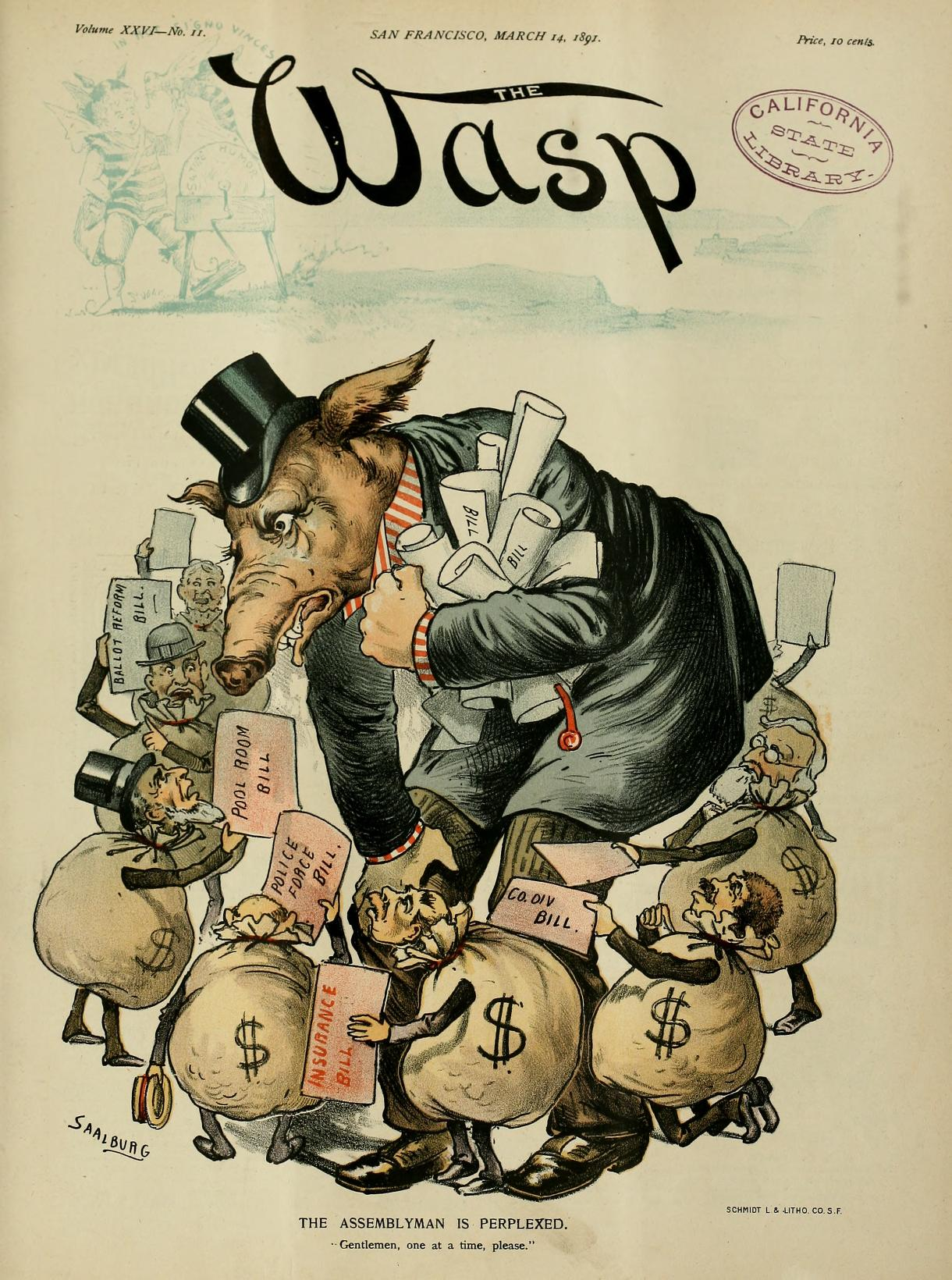
An 1891 cartoon about lobbying an American assemblyman

Lobbying involves direct meetings with legislators to influence policy decisions based on their political interests and goals. Lobbying can be carried out by various entities, including individuals acting as constituents, corporations pursuing business interests, nonprofits, NGOs through advocacy groups, interest groups, and political action committees.

Some government relations practices may include the use of campaign finance by contributing endorsements for political candidates and proposed public policies to achieve a group's political interests.

While there are different types of lobbying, the main form of lobbying to influence government action is by meeting with legislators. Groups that hire lobbyists will endorse expenditures, which refers to the total dollars spent on lobbying activity. These expenditures usually go towards setting up direct meetings with lawmakers, extensive data and research on policies, drafting proposals, and testimonies. During these meetings, lobbyists will share case studies, research, and relevant data in order to frame their policy strategy and solution as highly credible to legislators. Credibility is a huge factor in lobbyist-legislator relationships as it builds a sense of trust and cooperation in the policy making process aiming to advance or block certain policies.

When government relations work is done in-house among non-profit organizations, humanitarian aid organizations, trade unions, professional associations, trade associations, or chambers of commerce, it is referred to as policy and advocacy; where lobbying alongside litigation, public education, coalition building, capacity building, and other types of advocacy, is known as one of several components to the activity known as policy advocacy. It is also an industry known by many of the aforementioned names, and has a near-complete overlap with the public affairs industry.

Legislative relations can include legislators influencing each other or government officials in the executive and judicial branch agencies reporting to or interacting with the legislative branch through their respective offices of legislative affairs.

=== Methods ===
Lobby groups generally concentrate their efforts on legislatures, the process in which laws and policies are passed, as well as at the executive branch, where laws are enforced by regulatory agencies; but may also use the judiciary to advance their causes. For example by acting as parties or amici curiae (intervenors) in lawsuits. For example, the National Association for the Advancement of Colored People (NAACP), filed suits in state and federal courts in the 1950s in aims to challenge segregation laws. Their efforts resulted in the Supreme Court declaring such laws as unconstitutional.

Lobbyists and non-lobbyists may use a legal device known as amicus curiae (lit. 'friend of the court') briefs to try to influence court cases. Briefs are written documents filed with a court, typically by parties to a lawsuit. Amici curiae briefs are briefs filed by people or groups who are not parties to a suit. These briefs are entered into the court records and give additional background on the matter being decided upon. Advocacy groups use these briefs both to share their expertise and to promote their positions.

In 2013, the director general of the World Health Organization, Margaret Chan, illustrated the methods used in lobbying against public health issues:

Efforts to prevent noncommunicable diseases go against the business interests of powerful economic operators. In my view, this is one of the biggest challenges facing health promotion. [...] it is not just Big Tobacco anymore. Public health must also contend with Big Food, Big Soda, and Big Alcohol. All of these industries fear regulation, and protect themselves by using the same tactics. Research has documented these tactics well. They include front groups, lobbies, promises of self-regulation, lawsuits, and industry-funded research that confuses the evidence and keeps the public in doubt. Tactics also include gifts, grants, and contributions to worthy causes that cast these industries as respectable corporate citizens in the eyes of politicians and the public. They include arguments that place the responsibility for harm to health on individuals, and portray government actions as interference in personal liberties and free choice. This is formidable opposition. [...] When industry is involved in policy-making, rest assured that the most effective control measures will be downplayed or left out entirely. This, too, is well-documented, and dangerous. In the view of WHO, the formulation of health policies must be protected from distortion by commercial or vested interests.

Lobbying can be categorized as inside lobbying, which directly interacts with decision-makers, or outside lobbying, which pressures decision-makers through mobilization of public opinion.

=== Effects ===
According to a 2025 review of research on lobbying, three effects of lobbying have been documented in the academic literature:

First, in line with public suspicions, lobbyists have transactional relationships with public officials in which they exchange money for political access and influence. Second, lobbyists persuade public officials by providing information that changes the positions taken by policymakers. Third, successful mobilization of citizen support or lobbying coalitions helps lobbyists attain policy aims.

=== Public affairs industry ===
Public affairs generally refers to the engagement efforts between organizations, often times in the context of building business or governmental relationships. The industry has developed over recent years and is normally considered a branch or sub-discipline of public relations (PR). Having such a broad range of coverage regarding its definition, public affairs is, by nature, a hybrid of disciplines that relies heavily on strategic communication. While often equated with lobbying, this is usually only a small part of what a public affairs practitioner might do. Other typical functions include research, strategy planning and providing advice. Dr. Juan-Carlos Molleda writes, "Many types of organizations virtually and physically interact and communicate with publics or audiences outside of their own country of origin to build a dynamic set of relationships. Trade, direct foreign investment, political coalitions, worthy global causes, information flow, and social networking, among other phenomena, are increasing the complexity of those relationships dramatically".

Organizations who make use of public affairs are typically large companies, charities, trade unions, membership organizations and interest groups. They will either have staff working directly for them or employ a firm of public affairs consultants. Very often public affairs staff will work with their non-PR colleagues who are experts in a given field. Public affairs fundamentally has a global impact, and it is necessary to view it through the lens of the perspective nation in which it is being practiced.

Given public affairs' current development, there is still a common perception among those not within the industry that synonymize public affairs with lobbying, as well as public relations. Within the Global North, public affairs entails not only the former, but additionally information monitoring, media management, event planning and organization, political marketing, and of course, networking. The industry itself is expected to grow in employment opportunities by 7% between 2019 and 2029 in the US, faster than the average for all other occupations, and can mostly be contributed to the growing need for organizations to maintain their public image in such a media-abundant society. It is difficult to determine the size of the public affairs industry in the United Kingdom. Studies suggest the industry is becoming more professionalized, and that it is more widespread than often assumed. The Chartered Institute of Public Relations (CIPR), which is the UK's professional body for public relations including public affairs, estimates there are around 48,000 people involved in PR, of which 30% are involved in public affairs. This research is limited as it only measures specific job titles and those who declare themselves to be working in PR. There are large numbers of professionals providing public affairs services while working under different job titles across a wide variety of sectors. The job titles of public affairs practitioners may vary, depending on the focus of their role, but may include, "public affairs", "external affairs/relations", "corporate communications", "government/parliamentary affairs" and "policy".

Worldwide, the industry is expected to grow from $63.8 billion in 2018 to $93.07 billion by 2022. North America is currently holding the largest segment of that value, and is expected to maintain its standing, followed by Europe, with an increased investment in digital programmatic public relations efforts overall. Globally, governments are continuing to enforce data protection laws in order to protect individuals against unfair government or business practices, through regulations such as the General Data Protection Regulation (GDPR) in the European Union. In the United States, President Barack Obama has introduced several measures intended to increase transparency in public affairs. In an attempt to close the "revolving door" of executive-branch officials becoming lobbyists immediately following the expiration of their federal appointments, he issued Executive Order 13490 on January 21, 2009, dictating, among other things, a two-year ban on lobbying for former top executive branch officials related to any issue that they worked on during their final year in government employment. He also introduced a ban on verbal communication between lobbyists and the federal agencies tasked with awarding economic recovery funds. These measures have proved controversial and while some argue they are a positive and necessary step, others have deemed the policies as failures due to various loopholes.

The importance of media and the distribution of information in public affairs industry has experienced a myriad of trends over the last few decades. Between the 1950s and 1970s, studies found that there was an increase in the consumption of news through television broadcasting, while the newspaper decreased in circulation during this period. A study done in 1970 by Peter Clarke and Lee Ruggles also found that during this evolution from print to radio and television news, people still would turn to print or newspapers for local news, more often than national or international news on public affairs as it was considered easier to follow and understand. Moving into the 1980s and 1990s, the increased exposure to the readily available coverage of politics and public affairs, it was found that those who were interested in such information, readily sought it out and enjoyed discussing it with others. This sense of community and interest in conversing about such topics continues to evolve and has resulted into what is known today as social media. In fact, in the last decade or so, particularly among younger people, the consumption of news in general has declined and there is a reliance on getting information through social media. Thus, social media outlets such as Facebook and Twitter being some of the most popular, in addition to news apps, are increasingly becoming the main sources of political and public affairs news, and news in general.

=== Criticism ===
The ethics and morals involved with legally lobbying or influence peddling are controversial. Lobbying can, at times, be spoken of with contempt, when the implication is that people with inordinate socioeconomic power are corrupting the law in order to serve their own interests. When people who have a duty to act on behalf of others, such as elected officials with a duty to serve their constituents' interests or more broadly the public good, can benefit by shaping the law to serve the interests of some private parties, a conflict of interest exists. Many critiques of lobbying point to the potential for conflicts of interest to lead to agent misdirection or the intentional failure of an agent with a duty to serve an employer, client, or constituent to perform those duties. The failure of government officials to serve the public interest as a consequence of lobbying by special interests who provide benefits to the official is an example of agent misdirection. Lobbying can shift elected politicians away from the median voter. Politicians tend to vote against the preferred position of their constituency when there is more special interest money and less attention to politics. Lobbying can incentivise lax enforcement of laws. That is why lobbying is seen as one of the causes of a democratic deficit.

== Regulations ==
Nonprofit organizations, advocacy groups, volunteer coalitions, and political action committees may also engage in lobbying as part of their mission-related activities. Governments often define "lobbying" for legal purposes, and regulate organized group lobbying that has become influential. Requiring disclosure of financial expenditures, the identities of clients, and the specific issues being lobbied in order to promote transparency and limit potential conflicts of interest.

The international standards for the regulation of lobbying were introduced at four international organizations and supranational associations: 1) the European Union; 2) the Council of Europe; 3) the Organization for Economic Cooperation and Development; 4) the Commonwealth of Independent States.

Governments can define and regulate organized group lobbying as part of federal laws to prevent political corruption, thereby establishing transparency about possible influences by public lobby registers.

The Lobbying Disclosure Act (LDA), established in 1995, is a comprehensive reporting and disclosure framework that all registered lobbyists in the United States must follow. This act requires all lobbying firms to report expenditures that meet lobbying activity criteria. These disclosure statements must be filed every quarter corresponding to the two year legislation period and are accessible by the public.

Laws that regulate lobbying are extremely important for political and public transparency. Requiring registered lobbyists to file their activities allows for these contributions to be tracked, transparency of which groups are spending the most on lobbying, and which policies are receiving the most expenditures. Although these reports do not specify the policies certain groups are lobbying on, citizens are able to find out which groups are actively participating in lobbying and who spends the most in each sector. Having laws regulating lobbying holds lobbyists accountable by making their actions visible and prevents political corruption through public oversight.

=== Implications ===
As there are laws regulating lobbying, there are often loopholes in these frameworks. The Lobbying Disclosure Act (LDA) has several loopholes and weaknesses that allow lobbying influences to occur with limited transparency.

A significant implication of the LDA is the narrow definition of what is considered lobbying activity. To fall under these criteria, an individual must spend 20% or more of their time lobbying for a client and have more than one lobbying contact in a six month period. This means that firms that do not meet the 20% criteria are not required to disclose their lobbying activity. The time spent lobbying include time spent on policy research, strategizing for policy outcome, testimony, and drafting language. As a result of this, many firms deliberately structure jobs for employees to stay at 19% or less lobbying time on paper to directly avoid reporting their activities. In doing so, many firms also split lobbying work across multiple employees to avoid one single client reaching the 20% threshold.

Reform advocates of the LDA argue that this criterion focuses on the technical behavior of lobbying activities rather than policy influence. Many propose eliminating the 20% threshold and instead require that all registered lobbying activity is reported.

The LDA has been somewhat effective in encouraging lobbying transparency, however it is weakly enforced. The LDA authorizes the Department of Justice to enforce compliance, violations of the act can result in civil penalties and fines, even criminal penalties resulting in jail time. These penalties are often weakly enforced because the LDA depends on self-reporting files from lobbying firms which can be unreliable.

The revolving door concept disproportionately affects the lobbying industry. This is the cycle of former congress members switching between the roles as legislators and regulators, and with the roles of the industries affected by legislation and regulation. This is a major implication because one of the main assets for successful lobbying is the ability to directly contact and influence government officials. "Revolving door" lobbyists are able to use their inside knowledge on current legislation and use established personal relationships from their previous government jobs to sway policy outcomes. This climate is attractive for ex-government officials as it can bring substantial monetary rewards for lobbying firms, government projects, and contracts worth millions of dollars for those they represent.

When there are large corporations and groups competing to sway policy outcomes to reach their objectives, there is the implication of public interests being overshadowed. Lobbying can overshadow public interests when well-funded groups have more access to legislators, influence, and resources than ordinary citizens. Industries with high financial budgets are able to hire teams of lobbyists, fund political campaigns through PACs, and ultimately support candidates likely to align and protect their private political interests. This creates a system in which lawmakers might prioritize donor concerns over voters. On the contrary, the general public often have limited influence through voting, petitions, and lack direct access to lawmakers.

Industries with high levels of lobbying activity mean that the specific industry spends a lot of money, time, and effort attempting to influence laws and regulations that affect that industry. Many industries with heavy political influence, such as the pharmaceutical, oil/gas, technology, and finance industries will actively try to shape laws passed by Congress, regulations written by agencies, tax policies, and government contracts by hiring lobbyists to shape their market.

About 70% of all lobbying activity are from business groups. According to OpenSecrets in 2025, the US Chamber of Commerce spent about $53.7 million in lobbying activities as the number one top spender. Second, the National Association of Realtors spent about $38.4 million and third Pharmaceuticals of America spending at about $29.7 million. This reflects that industries and corporations that spend the most on lobbying have more at stake if certain policies are passed or not. The goal is to strategize policy outcomes to favor their respected industry.

Public perception of lobbying and support for lobbying regulation varies by country.

== Types of practitioners ==
In government relations, and advocacy in general, practitioners may fall into several different categories.

A "principal", is a person, organization, or member of an organization that hires a lobbyist to represent their interests before lawmakers or their staff in direct lobbying settings, or a (paid grassroots staff member or unpaid volunteer) "senior member" of an organization or advocacy group that is advocating for a certain cause on their own behalf without a registered lobbyist and coordinates constituent meetings between advocates, the legislators that represent them individually, and on behalf of interested individuals from the general public when conducted in grassroots lobbying settings.

"Advocates" (also known as "amateur lobbyists" or "volunteer lobbyists") who are practitioners of grassroots lobbying, such as individual voters/voter blocs within an electoral district, community organizers, (paid or unpaid) grassroots staff members, or amateur non-professional volunteers at advocacy groups and political organizations, who are there either as "constituent advocates" (i.e. constituents) ready to share their views and concerns with the lawmaker(s) that represent(s) them, or as principals and "non-constituent advocates" ("NC") reaching out to legislators' offices for which they are not a constituent of with the goal of advocating for specific causes the coordinating organization supports. In a legal sense advocates and amateur lobbyists may not even be classified as lobbyists at all due to not meeting the threshold for registration.

"Professional lobbyists" (most often simply referred to as "lobbyists" with no qualifier) are practitioners of direct lobbying, they engage in lobbying as a business or profession by trying to influence legislation, regulations, government decisions, actions, or policies on behalf of a group or individual who hires them and are generally required to enter their names into a lobby register as "registered lobbyists".

Then there are "non-lobbyist government relations and public affairs professionals" (such as consultants, administrative/program/project/secretarial/legislative support staff, researchers, lawyers, government relations specialists, legislative assistants, legislative coordinators, and, public relations/communications professionals, among others) who work on behalf of professional lobbyists but may not actively engage in directly influencing or face-to-face meetings with targeted individuals to the extent required for registration as lobbyists, operating within the same professional circles as registered lobbyists (i.e. not all government relations professionals are lobbyists, while all lobbyists are generally considered government relations professionals).

== Lobbying by country ==
=== Australia ===
Since the 1980s, lobbying in Australia has grown from a small industry of a few hundred employees to a multi-billion dollar per year industry. Previously associated with major corporations, it has expanded to local businesses as well. For example, Urban Taskforce Australia has morphed into an industry that employs over 10,000 people and represents every facet of human endeavour.

Academic John Warhurst from the Australian National University noted that over this time, retired politicians have increasingly turned political lobbyists to leverage their networks and experience for private gain. In 2018 he noted that two of the top three Howard government ministers had become lobbyists: Alexander Downer and Peter Costello, and that the trend could be traced back to the Hawke government of 1983. Mick Young stated that by 1983 the lobbying profession was an established part of the democratic political process in Canberra. Warhurst attests that by 2018, "political leader-lobbyists" were an established part of the same process. During the 1980s, political leaders traded on their own names, like Bob Hawke, or joined the "respectable" end of the lobbying spectrum, working for law firms or banks, like former New South Wales premiers Nick Greiner and Bob Carr. In 2008, Alexander Downer formed the lobbying firm Bespoke Approach, along with former Labor minister Nick Bolkus and Ian Smith, who is married to former Australian Democrats leader, Natasha Stott-Despoja. Peter Costello carried two former staffers to work with him in his lobbying firm, ECG Consulting: Jonathan Epstein and David Gazard. Politicians can become exposed to allegations of conflicts of interest when they both lobby and advise governments. Examples include Peter Costello.

Political party staff often form lobbying firms or dominate their ranks. Former Howard chief-of-staff Grahame Morris is the director of Barton Deakin Government Relations. His colleagues there include David Alexander (former Costello staffer), Sallyanne Atkinson (former Lord Mayor of Brisbane and former federal Liberal Party candidate), Howard staffer John Griffin and former New South Wales Liberal Party leader, Peter Collins. The Labor "sister" company is Hawker Britton, so named as both firms are owned by STW Group. In 2013, Hawker Britton had 113 client companies on its books.

In 2013, there were just under 280 firms on the Federal Australian Register of Lobbyists. Steve Carney of Carney Associated said that lobbyists "try to leave no thumbprints on the glass, no footprints in the sand. The best lobbying is when nobody knows you were there." Mark Textor of campaign advisory group Crosby Textor described political lobbying as a "pathetic miserable industry".

New state laws which came into operation in South Australia on 1 July 2025, have banned political donations, instead funding parties and candidates with taxpayer funds. The effect of the changes mean that minor parties and independents will be at a disadvantage, while incumbent parties will be well funded to run their campaigns with public money, although the legislation includes provisions such as advance payments to new entrants, who will be entitled to receive donations of up to $5,000 and will also be subject to a spending cap. According to The Australia Institute, around 75 per cent of public funding will go to the major parties, and only 1-2 per cent to new entrants. South Australia's changes have gone further than any other state, and possibly any other country, with this legislation.

==== Supermarket sector lobbying ====
Supermarket chains in Australia engage lobbying firms with political weight in their ranks. Australian Supermarket giant Coles is represented by both ECG Consulting and Bespoke Approach, while its own parent company, Wesfarmers, has former West Australian premier Alan Carpenter in charge of corporate affairs. Competitor Woolworths has a government relations team composed of former Labor and Liberal advisers, under the direction of a former leader of the National Party, Andrew Hall. Aldi engages GRA (Government Relations Australia), one of Australia's largest lobbying firms, whose staff includes former Federal Labor treasurer, John Dawkins.

==== Public lobbyist registers ====
A register of federal lobbyists is kept by the Australian Government and is accessible to the public via its website. Similar registers for State government lobbyists were introduced between 2007 and 2009 around Australia. Since April 2007 in Western Australia, only lobbyists listed on the state's register are allowed to contact a government representative for the purpose of lobbying. Similar rules have applied in Tasmania since 1 September 2009 and in South Australia and Victoria since 1 December 2009. A criticism of the lobbyist register is that it only captures professional third-party lobbyists, not employees of companies which directly lobby government. An example of this is BHP, which employs Geoff Walsh, a key advisor to Bob Hawke as an in-house lobbyist.

In 2022, The Mercury published a complete list of lobbyists registered at the Tasmanian Parliament. The field was dominated by former politicians, advisers and journalists in 2016.

=== Azerbaijan ===
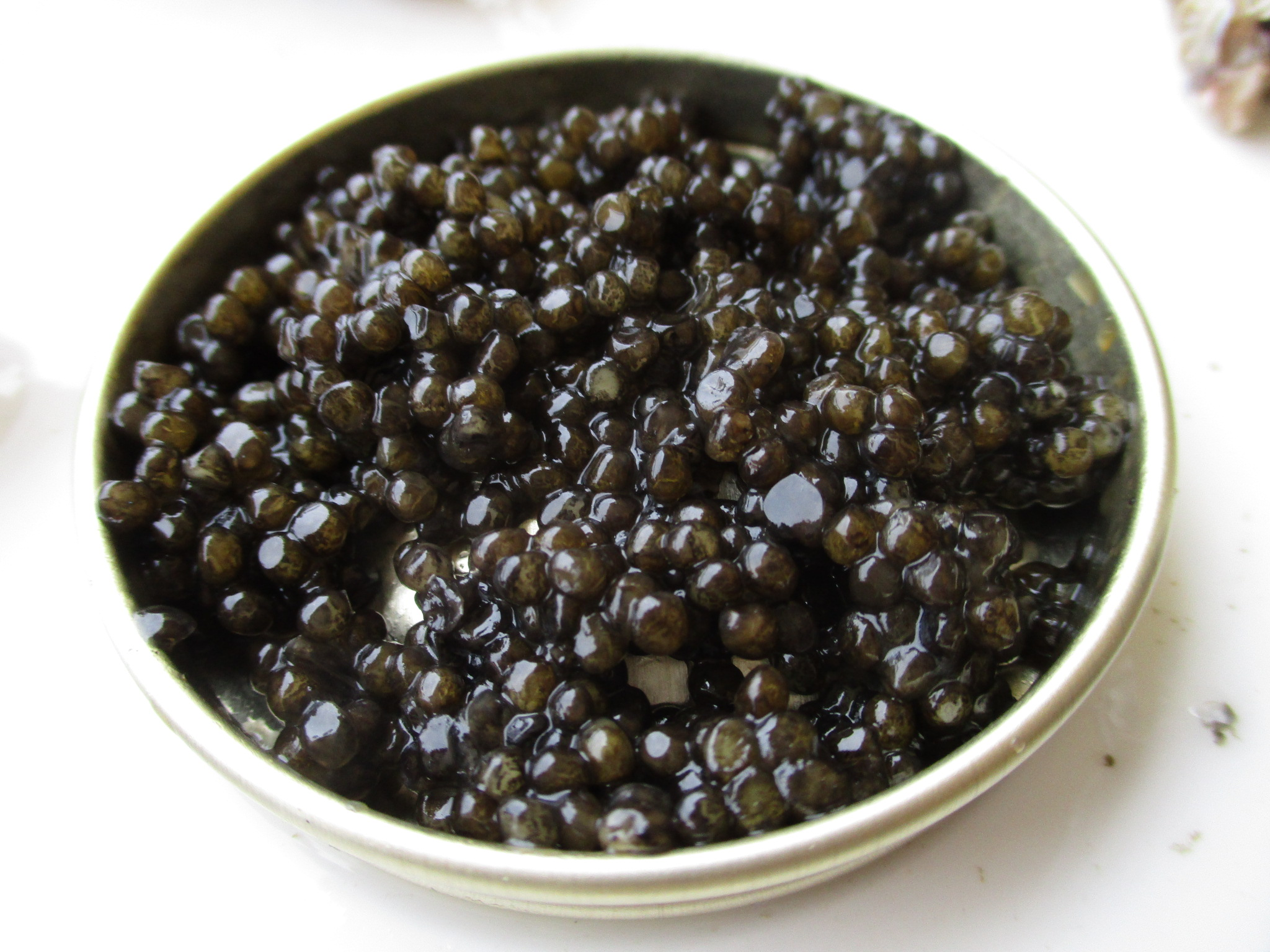
A bowl of Caviar

Caviar diplomacy is a lobbying strategy of Azerbaijan, consisting of costly invitations and bribes to foreign politicians and employees of international organizations to Azerbaijan at the expense of the host country. Caviar diplomacy also includes expensive gifts presented as "a tribute to the Eastern tradition."

=== Bahrain ===
In December 2022, Bahrain's lobbying efforts were reflected in a report by The Guardian, which involved the name of a senior Czech MEP Tomáš Zdechovský. The controversy concerned the European Parliament's "friendship groups", the unofficial bodies operating with no formal regulations and sometimes under sponsored lobbyists and foreign governments. The European Parliament was preparing to vote on a resolution to call for the release of a Bahraini political prisoner Abdulhadi al-Khawaja. However, the chair of the European Parliament's Bahrain friendship group, Zdechovský came under question for visiting Bahrain in April 2022, without declaring. In a separate resolution, Zdechovský's EPP failed to call for Khawaja's release and instead called him a "political opponent". Director of BIRD, Sayed Ahmed Alwadaei accused the Czech MEP of acting as a mouthpiece for Bahrain.

=== Canada ===
Canada maintains a Registry of Lobbyists. As of 2018, more than 5,000 people worked as registered lobbyists at Canada's federal level. Lobbying began as an unregulated profession, but since the late 20th century has been regulated by the government to increase transparency and establish a set of ethics for both lobbyists, and those who will be lobbied. Canada does not require disclosure of lobbyist spending on lobbying activities.

=== European Union ===
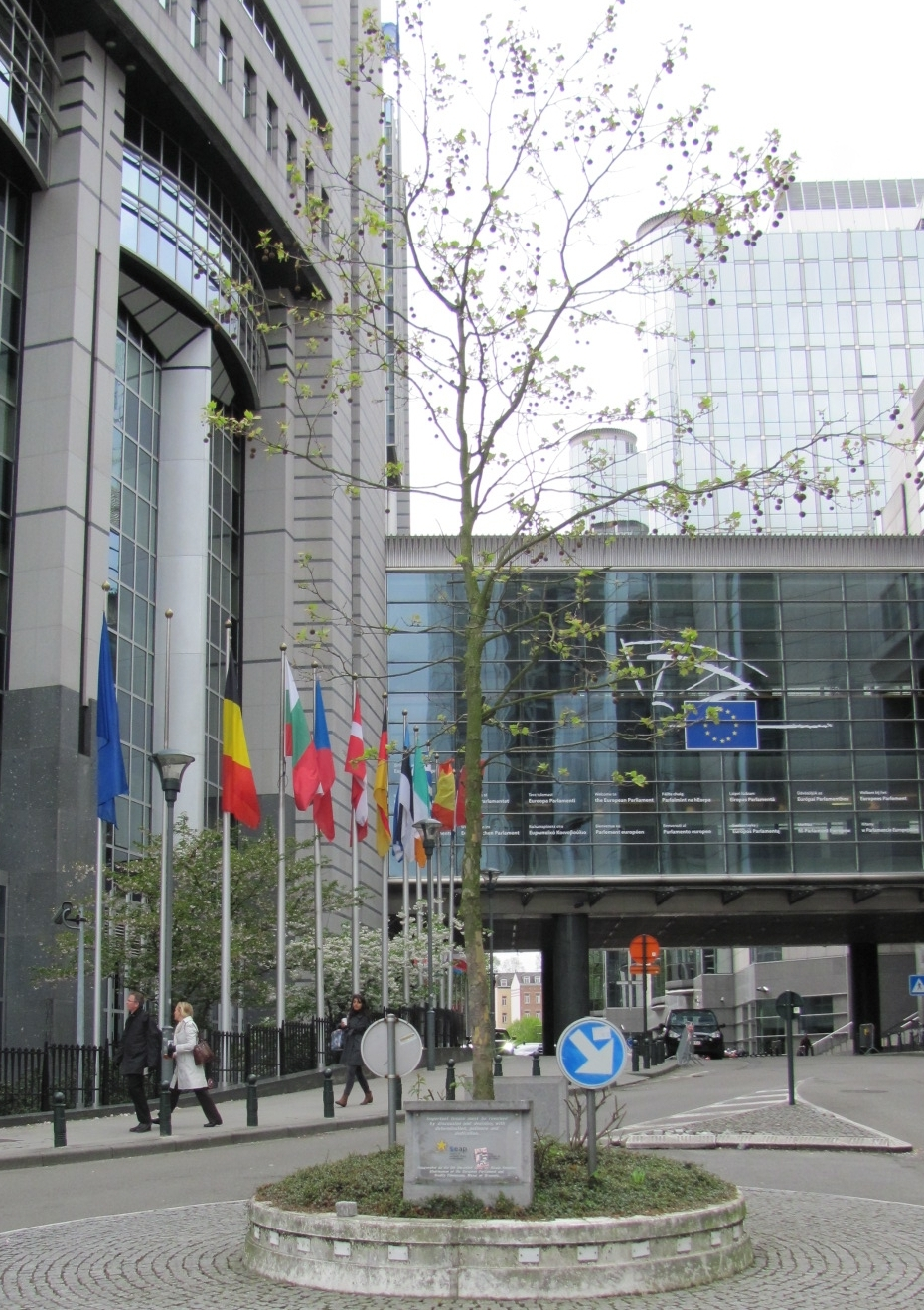
The "lobby tree", planted in 2001 by SEAP, the professional organization of lobbyists, at Wiertzstraat in Brussels, in front of the main entrance of the European Parliament

The first step towards specialized regulation of lobbying in the European Union was a Written Question tabled by Alman Metten, in 1989. In 1991, Marc Galle, Chairman of the Committee on the Rules of Procedure, the Verification of Credentials and Immunities, was appointed to submit proposals for a Code of conduct and a register of lobbyists. Today lobbying in the European Union is an integral and important part of decision-making in the EU. From year to year lobbying regulation in the EU is constantly improving and the number of lobbyists increases. This increase in lobbying activity is a result of the growing recognition of lobbying as a critical discipline at the intersection of politics, economics, and society.

In 2003 there were around 15,000 lobbyists (consultants, lawyers, associations, corporations, NGOs etc.) in Brussels seeking to influence the EU's legislation. Some 2,600 special interest groups had a permanent office in Brussels. Their distribution was roughly as follows: European trade federations (32%), consultants (20%), companies (13%), NGOs (11%), national associations (10%), regional representations (6%), international organizations (5%) and think tanks (1%), (Lehmann, 2003, pp iii).

In addition to this, lobby organisations sometimes hire former EU employees (a phenomenon known as the revolving door) who possess inside knowledge of the EU institutions and policy process. This practice of hiring former EU employees is part of what lobbyist Andreas Geiger describes as lobbying's vital role in shaping law and decision-making processes, given the unique insights and access these individuals provide. A report by Transparency International EU published in January 2017 analysed the career paths of former EU officials and found that 30% of Members of the European Parliament who left politics went to work for organisations on the EU lobby register after their mandate and approximately one-third of Commissioners serving under Barroso took jobs in the private sector after their mandate, including for Uber, ArcelorMittal, Goldman Sachs and Bank of America Merrill Lynch. These potential conflicts of interest could be avoided if a stronger ethics framework were established at the EU level, including an independent ethics body and longer cooling-off periods for MEPs.

In the wake of the Jack Abramoff Indian lobbying scandal in Washington, D.C., and the massive impact this had on the lobbying scene in the United States, the rules for lobbying in the EU—which until now consisted of only a non-binding code of conduct—may also be tightened.

Eventually, on 31 January 2019, the European Parliament adopted binding rules on lobby transparency. Amending its Rules of Procedure, the Parliament stipulated that MEPs involved in drafting and negotiating legislation must publish online their meetings with lobbyists. The amendment says that "rapporteurs, shadow rapporteurs or committee chairs shall, for each report, publish online all scheduled meetings with interest representatives falling under the scope of the Transparency Register"- the database of the EU.

The European allies were being lobbied by the UAE and Saudi Arabia to regain diplomatic ties with the Syrian government. The two Arab countries lobbied the European Union for months, pushing them to ease the sanctions on Syria for the revival of its collapsed economy. The UAE and its neighbour country argued that without the ease of sanctions, the diplomatic efforts to end the Syrian war would be ineffective. However, the EU nations, including France and Germany, turned down the idea of restoring ties with Syria, stating that it would legitimize the regime that is accused of massacring its own people.

==== France ====
There is currently no regulation at all for lobbying activities in France. There is no regulated access to the French institutions and no register specific to France, but there is one for the European Union where French lobbyists are able to register themselves. For example, the internal rule of the National Assembly (art. 23 and 79) forbids members of Parliament to be linked with a particular interest. Also, there is no rule at all for consultation of interest groups by the Parliament and the Government. Nevertheless, French National Assembly Motion for a Resolution No. 3399 was launched on November 21, 2006, to establish a register for representatives of interest groups and lobbyists who intend to lobby the MPs.

==== Germany ====
In Germany, lobbying has existed since 1956, when the Federal Constitutional Court issued a ruling legalizing it. A mandatory lobby register (German: Lobbyliste) was introduced in Germany effective 1 January 2022, along with a code of conduct. These rules were criticized as insufficient by several opposition party members and representatives from the Council of Europe, who argued that they did not adequately address issues of transparency and potential conflicts of interest. Stricter rules were initially scheduled to come into effect on January 1, 2024, however these legal alterations did not come into force until March 1, 2024.

==== Italy ====
Italy does not have lobbying legislation at the national level nowadays, even though there have been proposals by lawmakers over the years. In 2016, the Chamber of Deputies added an addendum that introduced a Regulation of interest representation. The Regulation expired in late 2017, when the term of the sitting Parliament expired. With the rise of the new parliamentary term in 2018, the Regulation was not being readopted. At the subnational level, only six regions have legislations about lobbying: Tuscany (2002), Molise (2004), Abruzzo (2010), Calabria (2016), Lombardy (2016) and Puglia (2017). These regional legislations have similar structure, but only Tuscany took a step forward to implement this legislation and create a public register.

In Italy, over the years, lobbies and power groups have obstructed the liberalization of markets and favored the protection of existing privileges. Despite various attempts to promote competition, such as the Law for the Market and Competition passed a year ago, the process has been riddled with delays, amendments and compromises that have weakened the law. Pressure from various lobbies led to the deletion of several important provisions. For example, due to pressure from pharmacists, the sale of Band C drugs in supermarkets and para pharmacies was skipped. Other provisions removed include the portability of pension funds, the sale of boxes or garages worth less than one hundred thousand euros without a notarized deed, the protected energy market, and the Postal Service monopoly. In addition, the rule on RCA tariffs was withdrawn after protests from insurance companies, while the diatribe between taxi drivers and Uber was postponed for a separate measure. Professional associations, such as lawyers and dentists, opposed measures that undermined their interests, such as the requirement for lawyers to have a quote or the requirement that dental companies be at least two-thirds owned by registered members. Other categories, such as hoteliers, called for a ban on Airbnb in the country. The lack of competitive markets is one of the main reasons Italy has not experienced economic growth in recent years. However, pressure groups continue to defend their privileges, hindering economic liberalization. The International Monetary Fund study indicates that true liberalization could grow Italy's GDP in a few years, but lobbies seem to be able to prevent such changes.

A 2016 study found evidence of significant indirect lobbying of then-Prime Minister Silvio Berlusconi through business proxies. The authors document a significant pro-Mediaset (the mass media company founded and controlled by Berlusconi) bias in the allocation of advertising spending during Berlusconi's political tenure, in particularly for companies operating in more regulated sectors. Using advertising data from the Nielsen AdEx database, the behavior of companies buying advertising space on Mediaset television channels during Berlusconi's tenure as prime minister was analyzed. It is hypothesized that some companies are more likely to advertise on Mediaset channels when Berlusconi is in power, indicating a potential correlation between advertising behavior and political influence.

A model of the Italian television advertising market was developed, distinguishing between regulated firms (interested in government actions) and unregulated firms (less interested in specific public policy changes). The model predicts that advertising prices on Mediaset increase when Berlusconi is in power and that the mix of advertisers on Mediaset channels shifts toward regulated firms during his tenure. To assess the impact of Berlusconi's political influence, industries were ranked according to their regulatory score, obtained from a survey of Italian economists. Highly regulated industries, such as telecommunications, pharmaceuticals, and manufacturing, showed a greater tendency to allocate a portion of their advertising budgets to Mediaset during Berlusconi's tenure. Despite higher prices for advertising space on Mediaset channels during Berlusconi's tenure, companies continued to advertise, suggesting that they expect significant political benefits from supporting the network. Mediaset's advertising partners are estimated to have paid about 1.9 billion euros more during Berlusconi's three terms, indicating the expected political value of their indirect lobbying efforts. This study provides evidence of market-based lobbying, in which companies strategically allocate their advertising budgets to gain political influence. It also highlights the additional conflict of interest that politicians with corporate holdings face and raises important questions about the role of money in politics beyond direct campaign contributions.

Another relevant case of lobbying that has been going on for at least 16 years concerns owners of beach establishments. Beaches are the Italian State's properties: since 2022, owners have had to pay a fee of 2698 euros to keep a public concession of a beach establishment. This is an amount of money that would be paid back just by renting for three months 2 beach umbrellas for 15 euros each (and in many cases, the renting prices are higher). The Court of Accounts has declared an imbalance between the fee and the gains from the beach establishment. Until 2009, according to a 1949 law, people who had public concessions had the right to keep them if there was no opposition from third parties. In 2009 this law was abolished under the menace of legal procedure from the EU for infraction of a 2006 directive, that established mandatory public procedures that were impartial and transparent. Anyhow, since then, governments continuously postponed any decision regarding modifying laws on public concessions for beach establishments. Under the government of Mario Draghi, the deadline for all concessions was established for 31 December 2023: anyhow, the new Prime Minister Giorgia Meloni assured in a letter of November 3, 2022, that "their government would defend the families that work in that sector", and delayed the deadline of the concessions. Some politicians claim that the families involved in the issue represent a significant and influential number of electors.

Finally, lobbying from taxi drivers represents a growing issue. The current situation in Italy regarding taxi services is regulated by Law No. 21 of 1992. According to this law, the responsibility for determining the number of taxi licenses, shifts, and fares is given to the municipalities. Taxi licenses are held by artisan business owners who have passed a driver's exam and are registered with the Chamber of Commerce. After holding a license for five years, reaching the age of 60, or due to illness, license holders can transfer their license to someone else upon indicating their preference to the municipality. In case of death, the license can be passed to one of the heirs or their designated individuals. Italy has an average of one taxi for every 2,000 inhabitants, whereas countries like France and Spain have ratios of 1,160 and 1,028 taxis per 2,000 inhabitants, respectively. This suggests that Italy has a relatively lower number of taxis available compared to its population. In August 2019, the then Transport Councillor Marco Granelli acknowledged the need to increase the number of taxi licenses by 450 to meet the demand. Data showed that a significant percentage of calls for taxis were going unanswered during peak hours and weekends. However, the issue was put on hold due to the COVID-19 pandemic, and it remains uncertain when it will be addressed.

==== Romania ====
Romanian legislation does not include an express regulation on lobbying activity. The legislative proposals initiated by various parliamentarians have not been finalized.

Attempts to regulate lobbying in Romania have appeared in the context of the fight against corruption. Anti-corruption strategies adopted in 2011 and 2004 mentions the purposes of the elaboration of a draft law on lobbying, as well as ensuring transparency in the decision-making activity.

In 2008 and 2011, the emphasis was mainly on transparency in the decision-making activity of the public authorities, regulation of lobbying activities no longer appeared as a distinct or expressly mentioned objective.

The Romanian Lobby Registry Association (ARRL) was founded in June 2010 to popularize and promote lobbying activity. ARRL is a non-profit legal entity that works under private law.

The majority of lobbying companies represent non-governmental organizations which activities include education, ecology, fundamental freedoms, health, consumer rights etc. Other entities that deal with lobby practice are multinational companies, Romanian companies, law firms and specialized lobby firms.

=== India ===
In India, where there is no law regulating the process, lobbying has traditionally been a tool for industry bodies like the National Association of Software and Service Companies, the Confederation of Indian Industry, the Federation of Indian Chambers of Commerce and Industry, the Associated Chambers of Commerce and Industry of India and other pressure groups to engage with the government ahead of the national budget and legislation in parliament. Lobbying activities have frequently been identified in the context of corruption cases, for example, the 2010 controversy surrounding leaked audio transcripts of conversations between the corporate lobbyist Niira Radia and senior journalists and politicians. Besides private companies, the Indian government has been paying for the services of a US firm since 2005 to lobby, for example, in relation to the India-US civilian nuclear deal. In India, there are no laws that defined the scope of lobbying, who could undertake it, or the extent of disclosure necessary. Companies are not mandated to disclose their activities and lobbyists are neither authorized nor encouraged to reveal the names of clients or public officials they have contacted. The distinction between lobbying and bribery still remains unclear.

In 2012, Walmart revealed it had spent $25 million since 2008 on lobbying to "enhance market access for investment in India". This disclosure came weeks after the Indian government made a controversial decision to permit foreign direct investment in the country's multi-brand retail sector.

Successful grassroots lobbying campaigns include the Mazdoor Kisan Shakti Sangathan's campaign to pass the 2005 Right to Information Act and Anna Hazare's anti-corruption campaign to introduce the 2011 Lokpal Bill.

=== New Zealand ===
There is no register for lobbying activity and no cooling off period for public officials before they can enter the lobbying industry in New Zealand, allowing politicians and Parliamentary staffers to immediately become lobbyists after leaving office. Kris Faafoi joined a lobbying firm just three months after leaving Parliament, where he had been justice and broadcasting minister. Lobbyists also move directly into staffer positions. Gordon-Jon Thompson took a leave of absence from his lobbying firm to work as chief of staff to Prime Minister Jacinda Ardern for four months before returning to his lobbying firm. Andrew Kirton resigned from his lobbying company on 31 January 2023 and the next day was announced as chief of staff for Prime Minister Chris Hipkins.

Some ad hoc provisions against revolving door politics exist in relation to certain industries. The Immigration Advisers Licensing Act 2007, for example, prohibits Ministers of Immigration, Associate Ministers of Immigration and immigration officials from becoming a licensed immigration adviser for one year after leaving government employment.

Transparency International (TI) criticized the lack of oversight in the New Zealand lobbying industry in a November 2022 report as lax.

=== United Kingdom ===
In the UK, lobbying plays a significant role in the formation of legislation. Various commercial organisations, lobby groups "lobby" for particular policies and decisions by Parliament and other political organs at national, regional and local levels.

The phrase "lobbying" comes from the gathering of Members of Parliament and peers in the hallways (or lobbies) of Houses of Parliament before and after parliamentary debates. The now-defunct UK Public Affairs Council (UKPAC) defined lobbying as:

in a professional capacity, attempting to influence, or advising those who wish to influence, the UK Government, Parliament, the devolved legislatures or administrations, regional or local government or other public bodies on any matter within their competence. Formal procedures enable individual members of the public to lobby their Member of Parliament but most lobbying activity centres on corporate, charity and trade association lobbying, where organisations seek to amend government policy through advocacy.

In the United Kingdom a 2021 poll found 69% support for increasing lobbying regulation.

=== United States ===
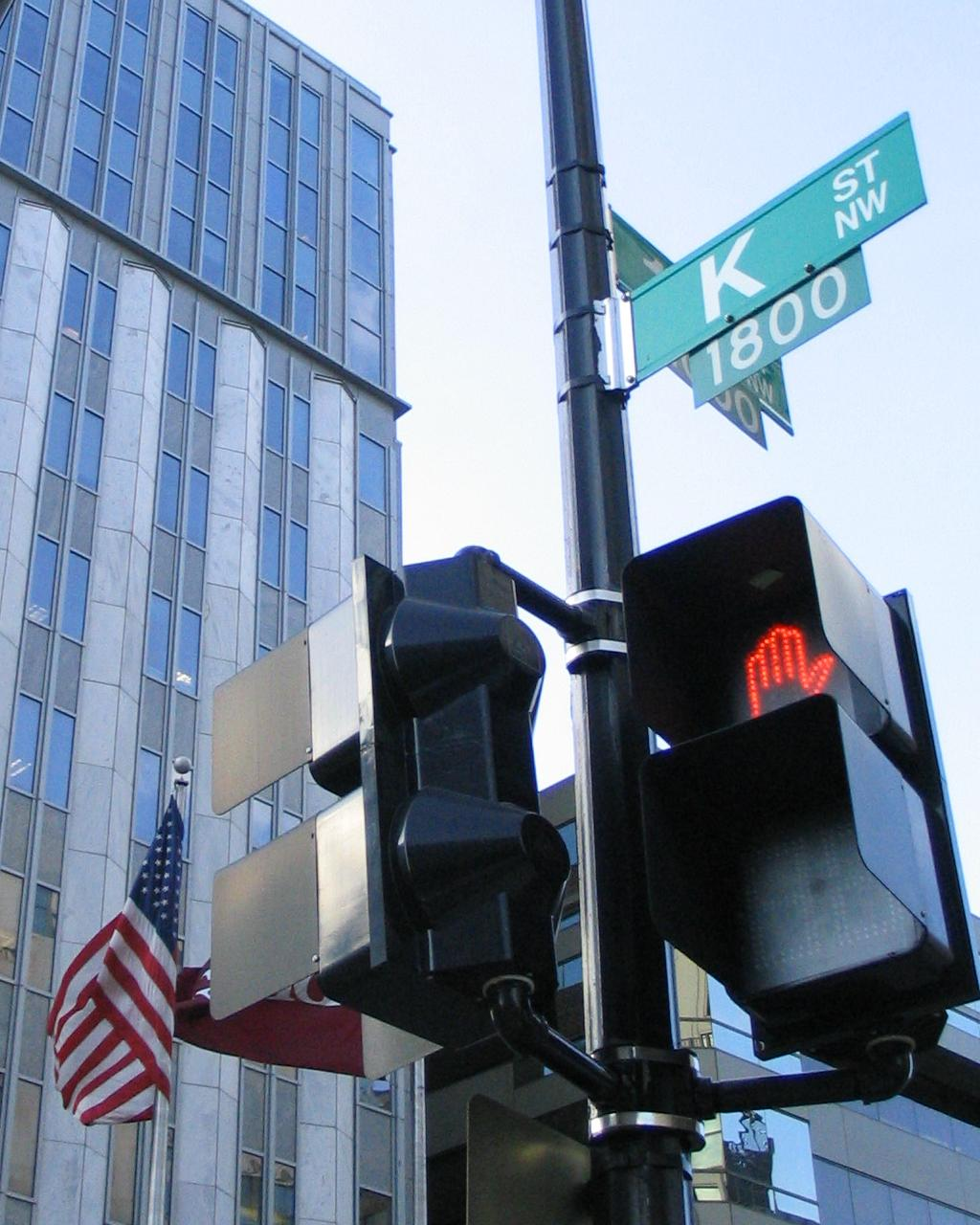
K Street NW at 19th Street in Washington, D.C., part of downtown Washington's maze of high-powered "K Street lobbyist" and law firm office buildings

In the United States, some special interests hire professional advocates to argue for specific legislation in decision-making bodies, such as Congress. Some lobbyists are now using social media to reduce the cost of traditional campaigns, and to more precisely target public officials with political messages.

A 2011 study of the 50 firms that spent the most on lobbying relative to their assets compared their financial performance against that of the S&P 500, and concluded that spending on lobbying was a "spectacular investment" yielding "blistering" returns comparable to a high-flying hedge fund, even despite the financial downturn. A 2011 meta-analysis of previous research findings found a positive correlation between corporate political activity and firm performance. A 2009 study found that lobbying brought a return on investment of as much as 22,000% in some cases. Major American corporations spent $345 million lobbying for just three pro-immigration bills between 2006 and 2008. A review of 30 food and beverage companies spent $38.2 million on lobbying in 2020 to strengthen and maintain their influence in Washington, D.C.

A study from the Kellogg School of Management found that political donations by corporations do not increase shareholder value. The authors posit a few reasons that firms continue giving despite little returns, including signaling firm values to investors and consumption value for individual managers.

Wall Street spent a record $2 billion trying to influence the 2016 United States presidential election.

==== Foreign lobbying ====
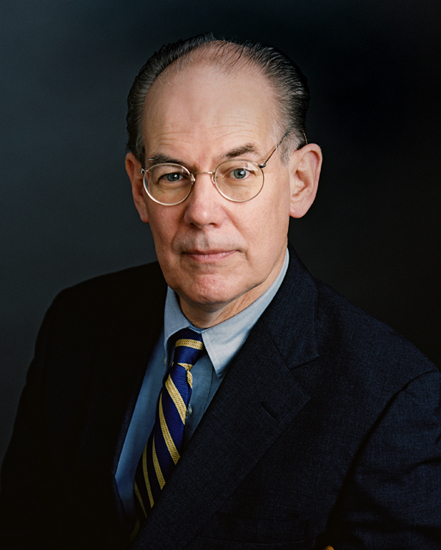
John Mearsheimer thematized the influence of lobbyists in his book called The Israel Lobby.

Foreign-funded lobbying efforts include those of Israel, Saudi Arabia, Turkey, Egypt, Pakistan, and China lobbies. In 2010 alone, foreign governments spent approximately $460 million on lobbying members of Congress and government officials.

In the US, lobbying for foreign governments is not illegal, but it requires registering as a foreign agent with the Justice Department under the Foreign Agents Registration Act (FARA). However, this legal requirement is able to be circumvented, most notably by AIPAC. Unofficially, according to Politico, 'many lobbyists try to avoid representing countries that have tense relationships with Washington or troubled human rights records'. Between 2015 and 2017, around 145 registered lobbyists were paid $18 million by Saudi Arabia to influence the U.S. government.

In January 2017, an order by Donald Trump led to a lifetime ban on administration officials from lobbying for foreign governments and a five-year ban on other forms of lobbying. However, the rule was revoked by Trump right before the end of his presidency. A number of Trump allies were found guilty of lobbying on behalf of foreign governments during the 2016 US elections, including Paul Manafort; Elliott Broidy pleaded guilty in October 2020 to failing to register as a lobbyist for a foreign individual. On January 19, 2021, President Trump granted Mr. Broidy a full and unconditional pardon.

=== United Arab Emirates ===
The United Arab Emirates has a long history of lobbying government and politicians in the West for its conflict of interest concerning building influence and using it to impact the country's foreign policy. In November 2022 it was accused of hiring PR and lobbying firms in order to promote to the politicians in the United States about its selection to host the COP28 Climate Conference. The problem was that the promotion started even before Egypt hosted 2022's COP27 Climate event. Fleishmann Hillard were hired to compose letters that proposed the idea of Emirati ministers attending conferences and events and using the phrase "the UAE is hosting COP28 next year". Whereas, Akin Gump Strauss Hauer & Feld were hired to reach out to US politicians particularly pushing the environmental policies or favouring fossil fuels in addition to informing them about the UAE hosting COP28. The Gulf nation even declared its intentions of achieving net zero emissions by 2050, even though 30% of their GDP relies on oil and gas directly, while the remaining relies upon industry run on heavy energy consumption.

In February 2024, New Westminster Mayor Patrick Johnstone faced scrutiny after attending the COP28 conference. Johnstone's expenses, including the conference fees, travel and accommodation, were incurred by C40 Cities Climate Leadership Group, of which Dubai is a member of the sterling committee. Councillors Daniel Fontaine and Paul Minhas filed a complaint against Johnstone for breaking the state's code of conduct. The investigation was assigned to Commissioner Jennifer Devins, who, in her October 2024 report, stated that Johnstone's trip provided personal benefits, which councillors are restricted from accepting. While Devins did not impose sanctions, she recommended Johnstone to take training on the laws of country.

A firm based in UAE, Alasriya Media Consultancy paid $10,000 a former CIA analyst Larry Johnson to run his podcast Counter Currents. The podcast discusses global politics, including a pro-Russian narrative of the Ukraine war and US foreign policy in the Middle East. The contract was signed in May 2024, but was not disclosed in FARA filing until November. The Emirati firm is represented by a Lebanese celebrity journalist, Ghina Amyouni, whose reason for funding the podcast was unclear.

In April 2025, a European Microscope for Middle East Affairs report uncovered the UAE's lobbying scandal in Europe, involving two human rights organizations– the African Meeting for the Defense of Human Rights (RADDHO) and TACUDU for Culture and Development. RADDHO, which claims to advocate for African human rights, accepted bribes from UAE-linked lobbyists to influence its activities. It was accused of aligning with the UAE's geopolitical agenda under the direction of Abu Dhabi, raising concerns over its neutrality. RADDHO received over half a million euros from the UAE-linked sources to promote negative campaigns against regional rivals, particularly Qatar, while neglecting human rights abuses in the UAE and its allies. TACUDU was also accused of exploiting its UN consultative status and receiving €350,000 from sources linked to the UAE embassy in Geneva to target Qatar through political campaigns. This led to calls for the United Nations Human Rights Council to suspend TACUDU's consultative status for violating norms expected of NGOs holding UN consultative status.

=== Other ===
- Israel (1994) – a unique lobby which is called "Lobby 99" is working at the Israeli parliament. This is a lobby which is funded by the people by crowdfunding and working for the people, the 99 percent who are not among the elites which most lobbying companies represent.
- Ukraine: Ukrainian President Volodymyr Zelenskyy has signed into law the much-anticipated legislation on lobbying, officially known as draft law No. 10337
- Kazakhstan: Since 1998, Kazakhstan has been trying to pass a law on lobbying. The National Chamber of Entrepreneurs of Kazakhstan "Atameken" is one of the first official lobbying structures in the country, but there are other examples.
- South Korea: In South Korea, lobbying is viewed as a form of corruption and is illegal.
- United Nations are relevant to NGO lobbying.

== See also ==
- Activism
- Policy advocacy
- Public affairs industry
- Legislative assistant
- Legislative coordinator
- Advocacy Evaluation
- Bribery
- Campaign finance
- Competition law
- Client politics
- Fossil fuels lobby
- European Women's Lobby
- Exit, Voice, and Loyalty Model
- Issue advocacy ads
- Kickback
- Money loop
- Outline of public affairs
- Political accountability
- Pharmaceutical lobby

== Bibliography ==
- "The Lobbying Disclosure Act at 20: Analysis and Issues for Congress". Apertacontrada.
- Joos, Klemens: Lobbying in the new Europe. Successful representation of interests after the Treaty of Lisbon, 244 pages, ISBN 978-3-527-50597-5, Wiley VCH 2011
- Nesterovych V. (2015) EU standards for the regulation of lobbying. Prawa Człowieka. nr 18: 97–108.
- Nesterovych, Volodymyr (2010). "Legalization, accreditation, control and supervisory activity concerning lobbyists and lobbying organizations: prospects for Ukraine Archived 2020-08-03 at the Wayback Machine". Power. Man. Law. International Scientific Journal. No. 1: 96–105.
- Geiger, Andreas: EU Lobbying handbook, A guide to modern participation in Brussels, 244 pages, ISBN 3-9811316-0-6, Helios Media GmbH, 2006
- GLOSSARY – Alphabetical list of terms associated with the Lobbying industry
- The Bulletin, 16 March 2006, p. 14, Lobbying Europe: facts and fiction
- The European Lawyer, December 2005/January 2006, p. 9, The lobbyists have landed
- Financial Times, 3 October 2005, p. 8, Brussels braces for a U.S. lobbying invasion
- Public Affairs News, November 2004, p. 34, Judgement Call
- The European Lawyer, December 2004/January 2005, p. 26, Lifting the lid on lobbying
- Pier Luigi Petrillo, Democracies under Pressures. Lobbies and Parliaments in a comparative public law, Giuffrè 2011 (www.giuffre.it)
- Pietro Semeraro, I delitti di millantato credito e traffico di influenza, ed. Giuffre, Milano, 2000.
- Pietro Semeraro, Trading in Influence and Lobbying in the Spanish Criminal Code, PDF
- Wiszowaty, Marcin: Legal Regulation of Lobbying in New Members States of the European Union, Arbeitspapiere und Materialien – Forschungsstelle Osteuropa an der Universitat Bremen, No. 74: Heiko Pleines (ed.): Participation of Civil Society in New Modes of Governance. The Case of the New Member States. Part 2: Questions of Accountability. February 2006 (PDF)
- Heiko Kretschmer/ Hans-Jörg Schmedes: Enhancing Transparency in EU Lobbying? How the European Commission's Lack of Courage and Determination Impedes Substantial Progress, Internationale Politik und Gesellschaft Archived 2021-03-14 at the Wayback Machine 1/ 2010, S. 112–122
- "Lobbying". BBC News: Politics. London: BBC. 22 December 2005.
- "Police loans inquiry is widenened". London: BBC News. 30 March 2006.
