= Embassy of the United States, Riyadh =

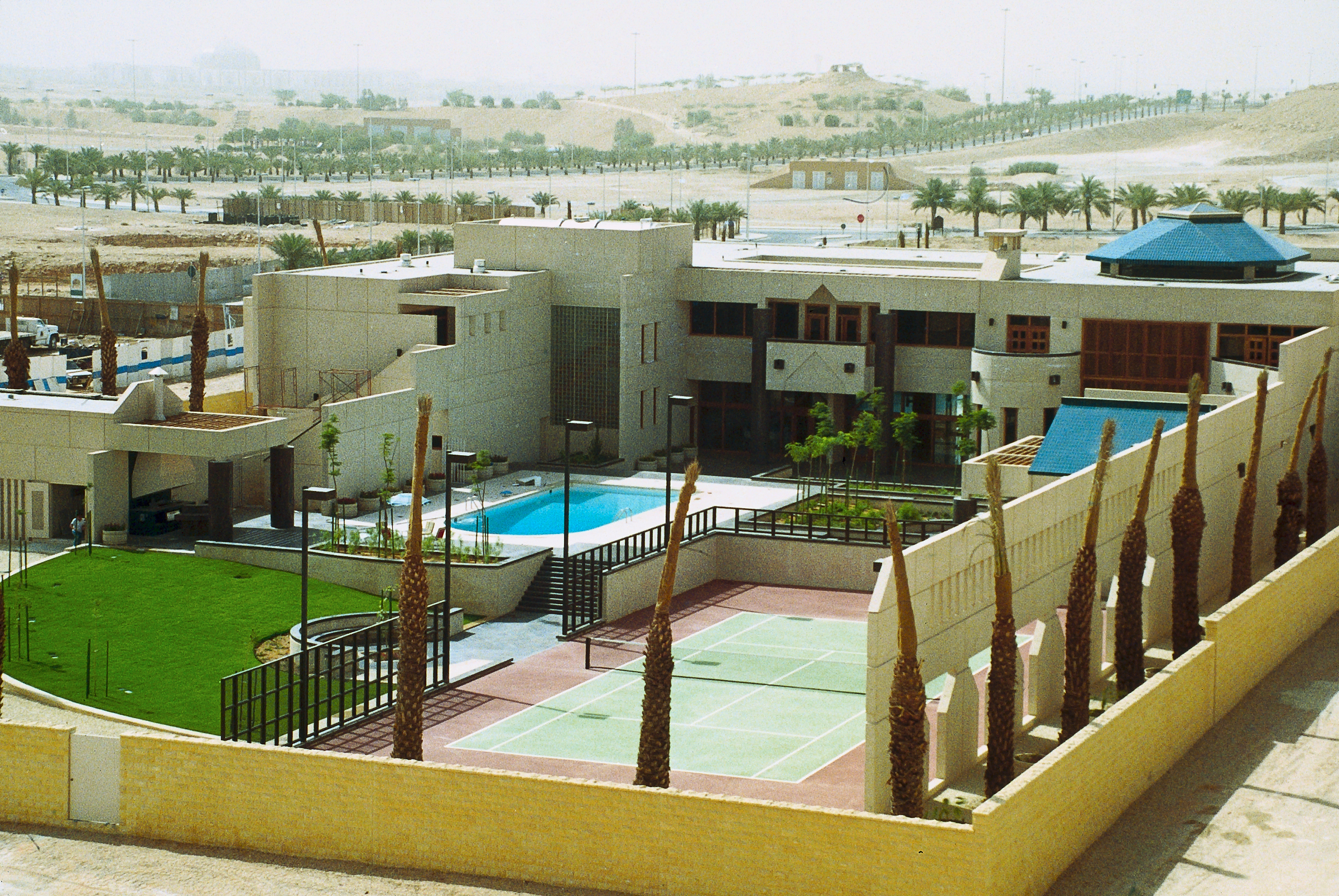
- Location: Riyadh, Saudi Arabia
- Address: Abdullah Ibn Hudhafah As Sahmi Street Roundabout no. 9, Diplomatic Quarter Riyadh, Saudi Arabia
- Coordinates: 24°40′53″N 46°37′17″E
- Chargé d'affaires: Jennifer Larson
- Website: https://sa.usembassy.gov

The Embassy of the United States, Riyadh is the embassy of the United States located in the capital city of Riyadh, Saudi Arabia.

The relationship between the United States and Saudi Arabia is of importance due to a confluence of economic, strategic, and geopolitical factors. Central to this bond are energy interests, with Saudi Arabia being one of the world's leading oil producers and exporters.

== History ==
Diplomatic relations between the United States and the Kingdom of Saudi Arabia were officially established on February 14, 1940, after the United States recognized the Kingdom of Hejaz and Nejd and its Dependencies on May 1, 1931. The first envoy, Bert Fish, presented his credentials as U.S. Envoy Extraordinary and Minister Plenipotentiary to King Abdulaziz in 1940 while being resident in Cairo, Egypt.

A U.S. Legation was opened in Jeddah on May 1, 1942, with James S. Moose, Jr. serving as Chargé d'Affaires ad interim. On March 18, 1949, the Legation was elevated to an Embassy as J. Rives Childs presented his credentials as the first Ambassador Extraordinary and Plenipotentiary.

In 1984, amid the urban development of the Kingdom's capital, the U.S. Embassy was relocated from Jeddah to Riyadh; the Jeddah mission became a Consulate General.

In 2026, the embassy was damaged and set on fire by two Iranian drones during Iran's retaliatory attacks during the 2026 Iran war. Initial reports by Saudi authorities spoke of a limited fire and minor material damage to the building. The Embassy issued a "shelter in place" alert following the attack, and closed the facility, as well as the Kuwait embassy. A month later, press research by the Wall Street Journal pointed to substantial damage and a more sophisticated attack, with the first drone destroying a wall and a second drone entering the building through that opening, exploding inside. Three levels of the building were severely damaged and a fire burned for several hours.

== Gallery ==
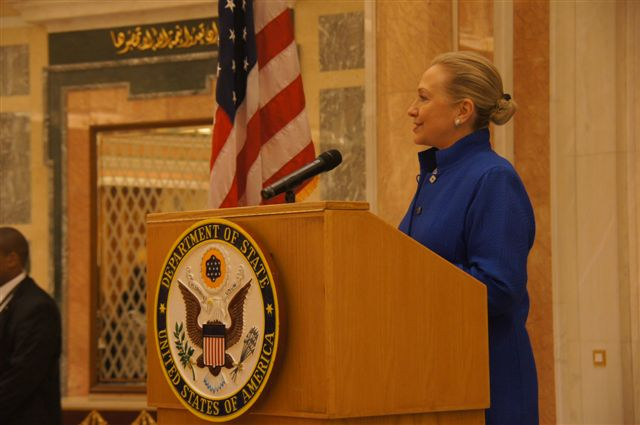
Hillary Clinton delivers remarks to U.S. Embassy staff in 2012

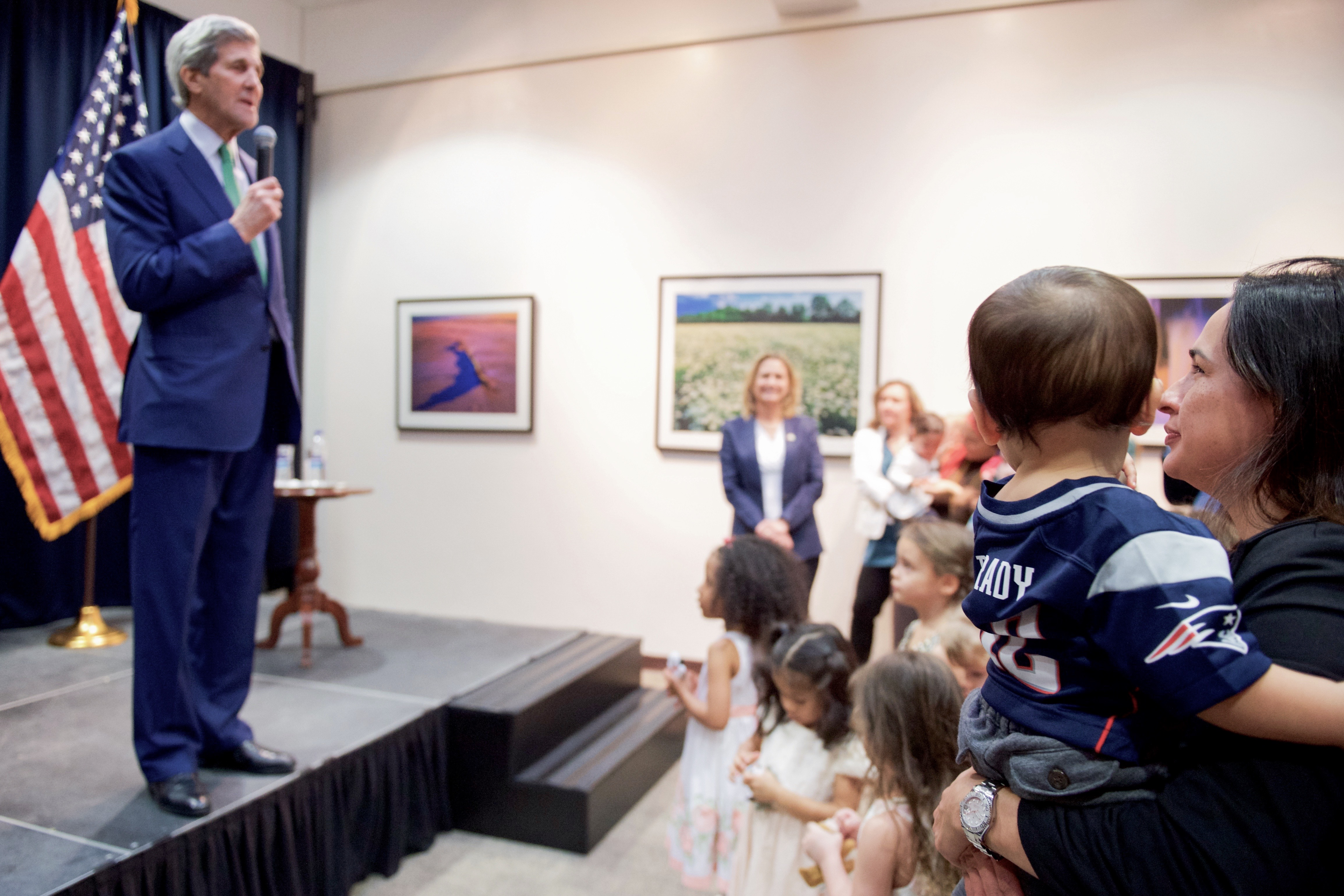
John Kerry addresses embassy workers in 2016

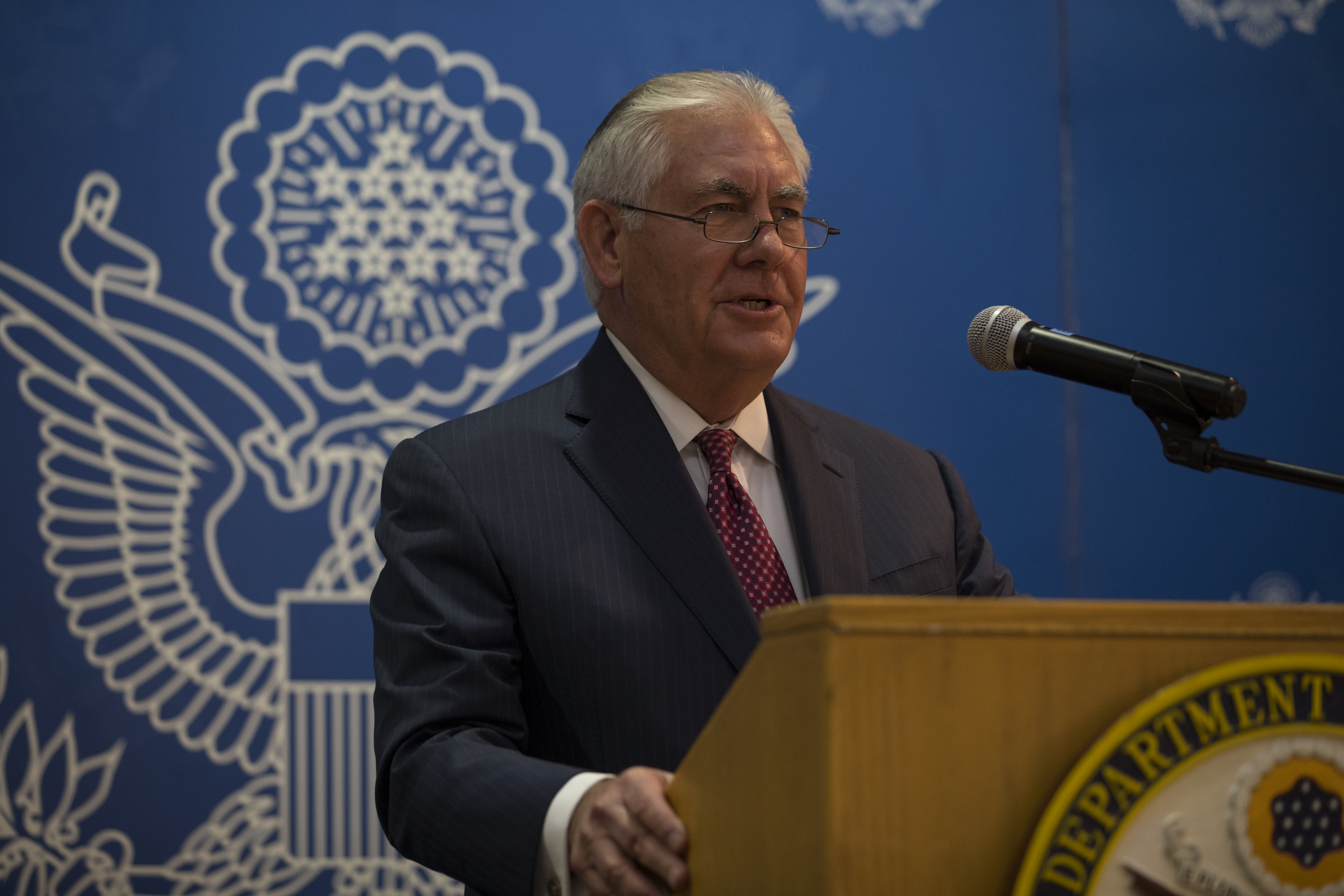
Rex Tillerson speaks to U.S. Embassy staff and their families in 2017

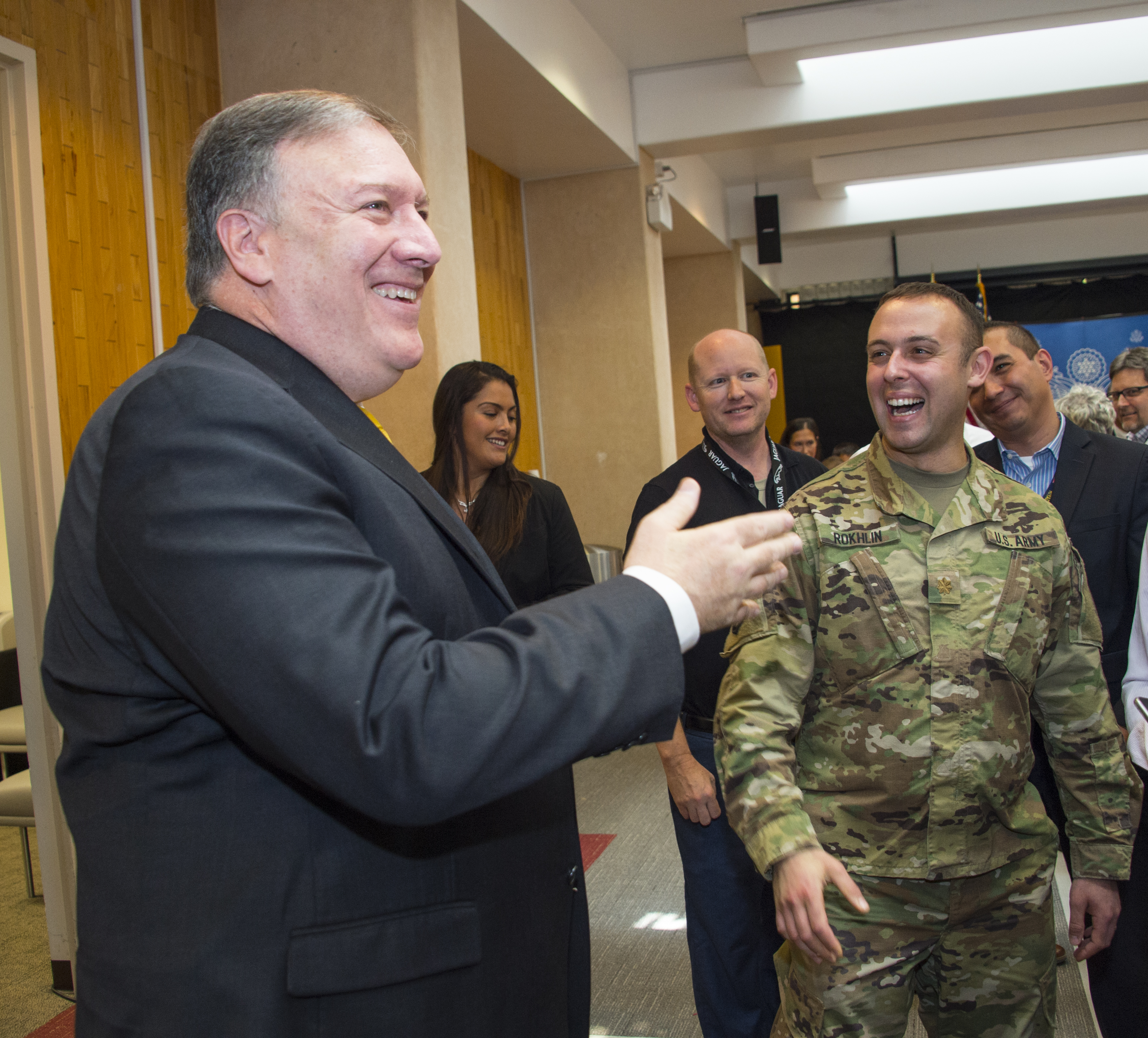
Mike Pompeo meets with staff and families from U.S. Embassy Riyadh in 2018

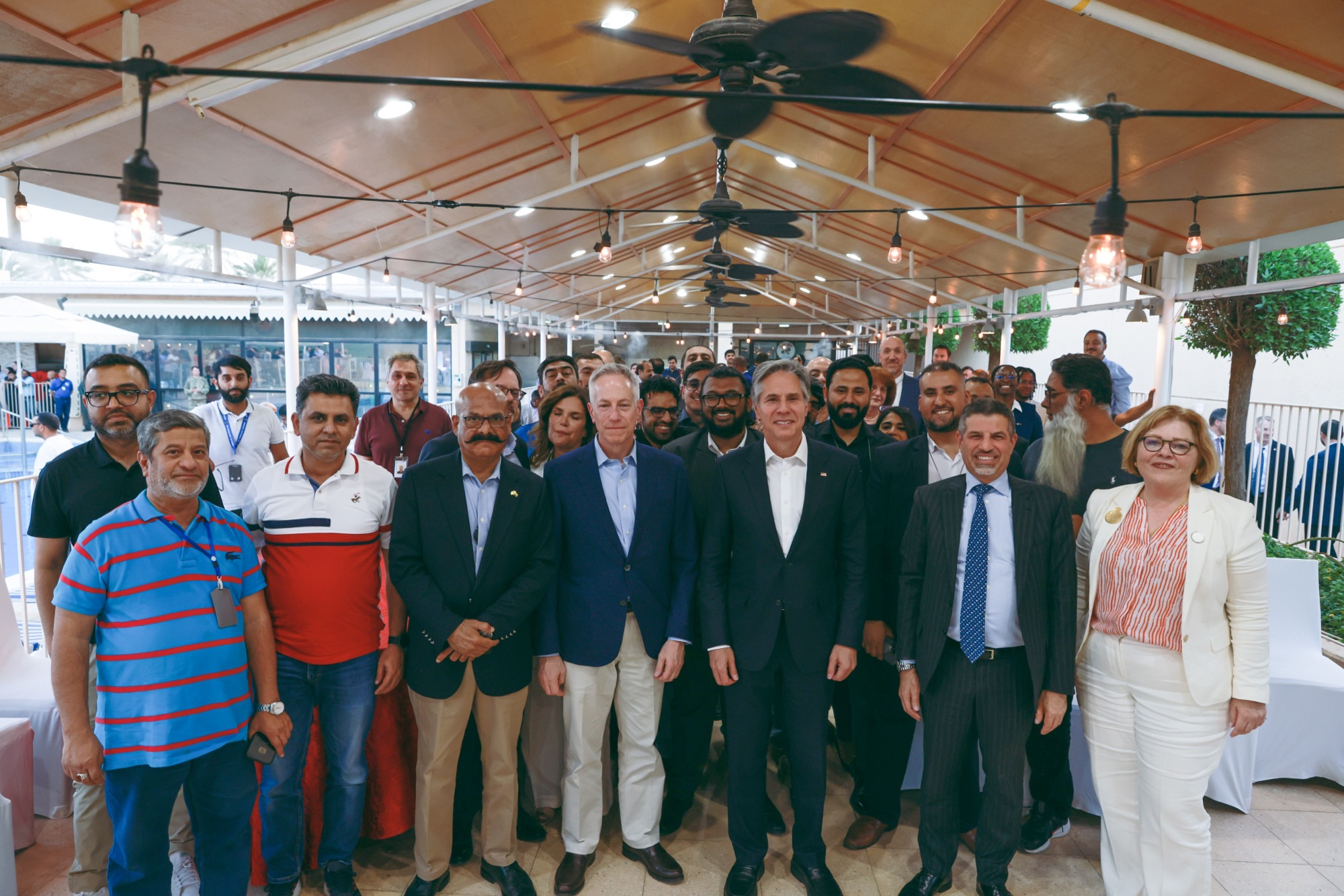
Antony J. Blinken holds a meet and greet with employees in 2023

== See also ==
- Embassy of Saudi Arabia, Washington, D.C.
- List of ambassadors of the United States to Saudi Arabia
- Saudi Arabia–United States relations
- United States Ambassador to Saudi Arabia
