= Saudi Arabia–United States relations =

- Saudi Arabia: United States

Diplomatic mission
- Embassy of Saudi Arabia, Washington, D.C.: Embassy of the United States, Riyadh

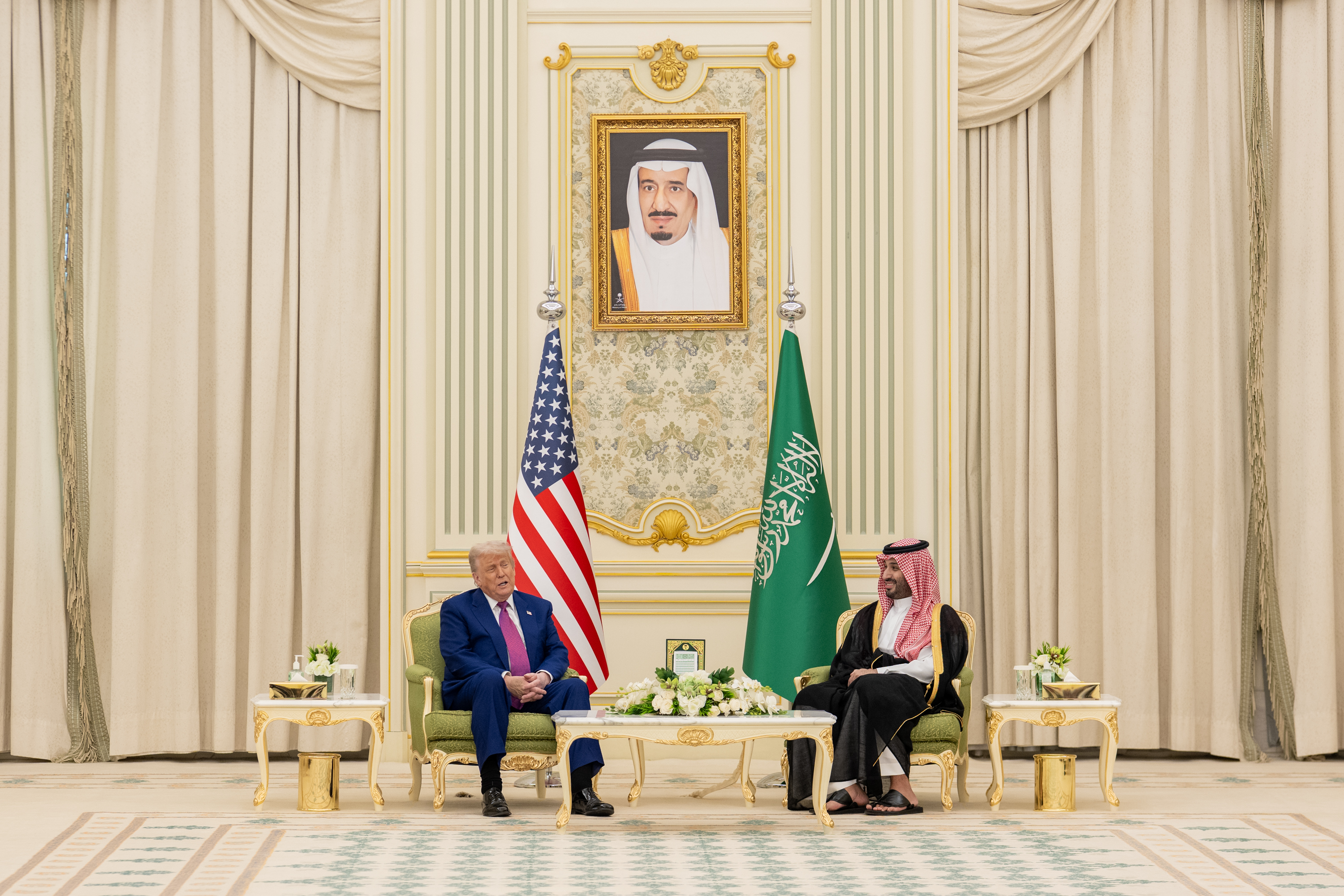
U.S. President Donald Trump with the Crown Prince of Saudi Arabia Mohammed bin Salman in Riyadh in May 2025.

Bilateral relations between Saudi Arabia and the United States began in 1933 when full diplomatic relations were established. These relations were formalized under the 1951 Mutual Defense Assistance Agreement. Despite the differences between the two countries—an Islamic absolute monarchy versus a secular constitutional republic—the two countries have been allies ever since. The U.S. provides military protection to the Kingdom in exchange for a reliable oil supply, pricing of oil in U.S. dollars, and support for American foreign policy.

Ever since the modern relationship began in 1945, the U.S. has been willing to overlook some of the kingdom's domestic and foreign policy aspects as long as it maintained oil production and supported American national security policies. These aspects include Wahhabism, its human rights record, and alleged state-sponsored terrorism. After the Soviet invasion of Afghanistan in 1979, the alliance deepened, as both countries jointly supported Afghan resistance militias during the 1980s. The Gulf War (1990–1991) marked a high point in the relationship when both countries and the UK jointly led an international military coalition in response to the Iraqi invasion of Kuwait. While the two countries continue to enjoy strong ties, critical disagreements have emerged over the years. Examples include Israel, the 1973 oil embargo, the 2003 U.S.-led invasion of Iraq, the "war on terror", and Saudi influence after the September 11 attacks. In recent years, particularly since the Barack Obama administration, the relationship has become strained and witnessed a major decline.

Saudi-U.S. relations were strengthened by the Trump administration's trip to Saudi Arabia in May 2017. In October 2018, Saudi dissident and Washington Post journalist Jamal Khashoggi was assassinated in a Saudi consulate in Turkey. This became a breaking point in relations and caused a serious rift between the two countries. The United States sanctioned some Saudi nationals, and Congress attempted to cut off U.S. weapons sales to Saudi Arabia related to the war in Yemen. However, this was unsuccessful due to opposition from the Trump administration. Turkish authorities and U.S. intelligence agencies concluded that the killing was ordered by Mohammed bin Salman, the crown prince of Saudi Arabia.

During his election campaign, Biden had pledged to make Saudi Arabia "a pariah". The Biden Administration emphasized its human rights policy as the key arbiter of the U.S. relationship with Saudi Arabia. Diplomatic relations hit a new low after a February 2021 U.S. intelligence report accused the crown prince of being directly involved in the assassination of Khashoggi. During Russia's invasion of Ukraine, Saudi Arabia defied U.S. efforts to isolate Vladimir Putin and instead strengthened relations with Russia by coordinating to reduce oil output of OPEC countries in October 2022. This event triggered a strong backlash in the United States, with relations sinking to an "all-time low" and tensions exacerbating further. American officials have criticized Saudi Arabia for actively enabling Russians to bypass US-EU sanctions and for undermining Western efforts to isolate Vladimir Putin. Saudi Arabia has also defied the United States' China containment policy. In December 2022, Saudi Arabia hosted Chinese leader Xi Jinping for a series of summits to sign a "comprehensive strategic partnership agreement" which elevated Sino-Arab relations. However, after Trump returned to the presidency in 2025, he chose to visit the Kingdom again as his first visit, while calming the friction caused by the previous administration.

== History ==
=== Early history and recognition ===
The founder of Saudi Arabia, King Abdulaziz Al Saud (a.k.a. Ibn Saud), developed close ties with the United States. After unifying his country in 1928, he set about gaining international recognition. Great Britain was the first country to recognize Saudi Arabia as an independent state. In May 1931, the U.S. officially recognized Saudi Arabia by extending full diplomatic recognition. At the same time, Ibn Saud granted a concession to the U.S. company Standard Oil of California and allowed them to explore for oil in the country's Eastern Province, al-Hasa.

In November 1931, a treaty was signed by both nations which included favored nation status. However, the relationship was still weak because America did not have an interest in establishing missions in Saudi Arabia. At the time, Saudi affairs were handled by the U.S. delegation in Cairo, Egypt. In 1943, the U.S. finally sent a resident ambassador.

=== World War II ===
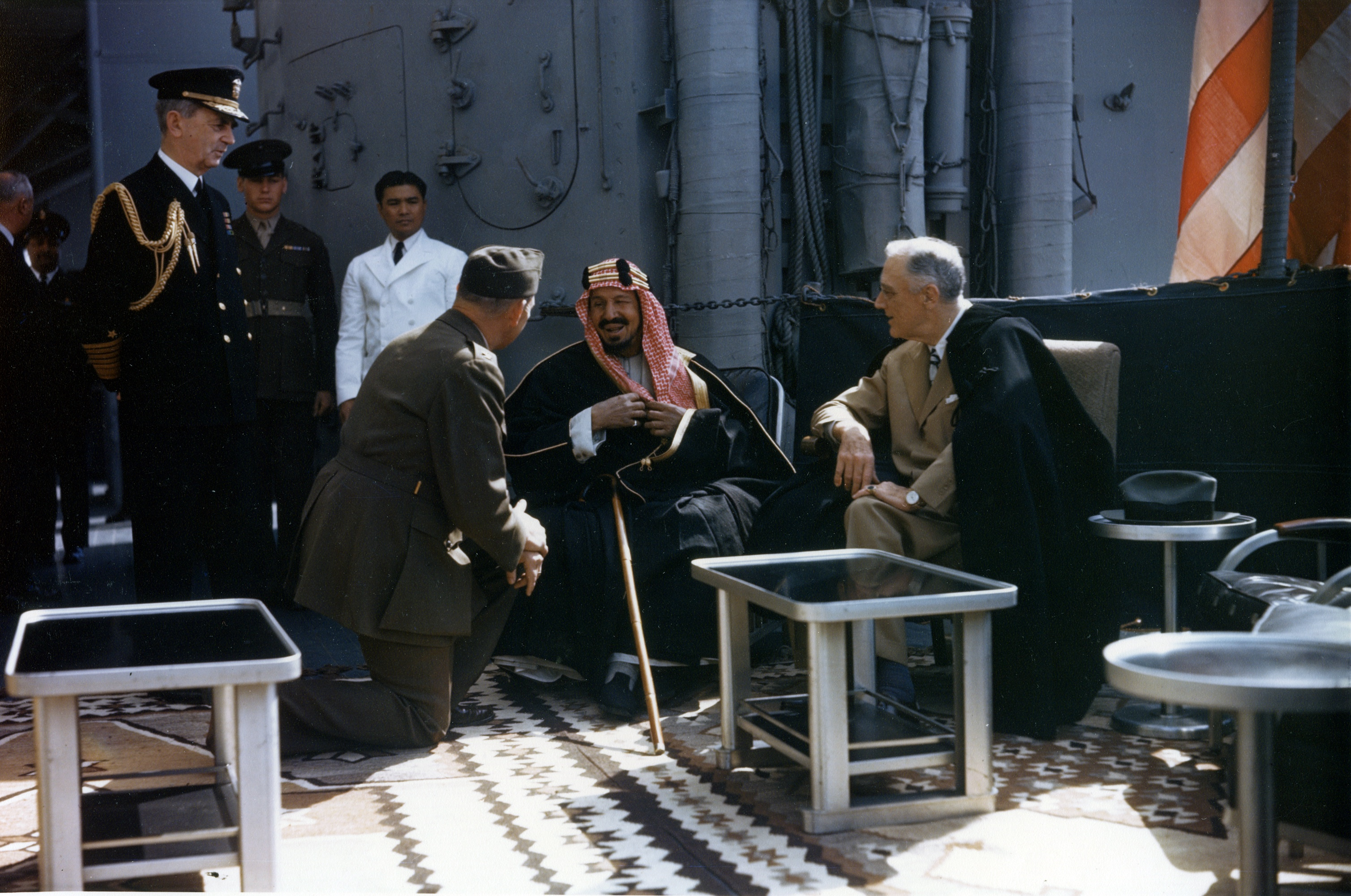
King Ibn Saud converses with President Franklin D. Roosevelt on board the USS Quincy, after the Yalta Conference in 1945.

As the U.S.–Saudi relationship was growing slowly, World War II was beginning its first phase, with Saudi Arabia remaining neutral. The U.S. was deeply involved in World War II, and U.S.–Saudi relations were put on the 'back burner' as a result. This negligence left Saudi Arabia vulnerable to attack. Italy, an Axis power, bombed a CASOC oil installation in Dhahran and crippled Saudi Arabia's oil production. This attack left Bin Saud scrambling to find an external power that would protect the country. He feared that further attacks would cease not only the country's oil production but also the flow of pilgrims coming into Mecca to perform Hajj, the basis of Saudi power and its economy at that time.

However, as World War II progressed, the United States began to believe that Saudi oil was of strategic importance. As a result, in the interest of national security, the U.S. began to push for greater control over the CASOC concession. On February 16, 1943, President Franklin D. Roosevelt declared that "the defense of Saudi Arabia is vital to the defense of the United States" and, thereby, extended the Lend-Lease program to the kingdom. Later that year, the president approved the creation of the state-owned Petroleum Reserves Corporation, with the intent that it purchase all CASOC stock and thus gain control of Saudi oil reserves in the region. However, the plan was met with opposition and ultimately failed. Roosevelt continued to court the government, and, on February 14, 1945, he met with King Ibn Saud aboard the USS Quincy. They discussed topics such as the two countries' security relationship and the creation of a Jewish country in the Mandate of Palestine.

Bin Saud approved the U.S.'s request to allow the U.S. Air Force to fly over and construct airfields in Saudi Arabia. Oil installations were rebuilt and protected by the U.S. Pilgrimage routes were also protected, and the U.S. gained a much needed direct route for military aircraft heading to Iran and the Soviet Union. The first American consulate was opened in Dhahran in 1944.

=== After World War II ===
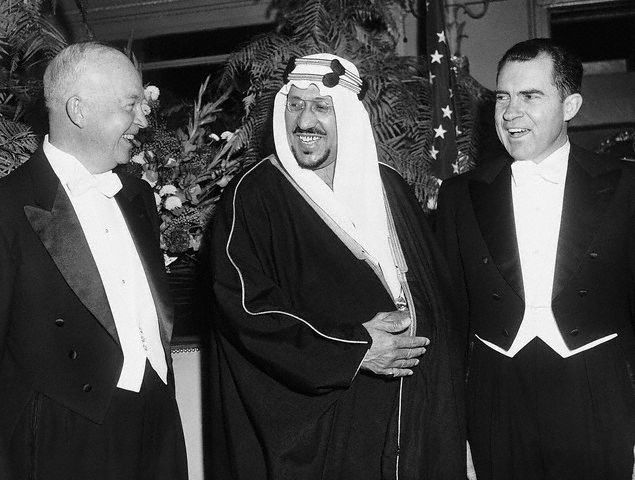
President Eisenhower and Vice President Richard Nixon with their host, King Saud of Saudi Arabia, at the Mayflower Hotel in 1957

In 1945, after World War II, Saudi citizens began to feel uncomfortable with U.S. forces still operating in Dhahran. In contrast, the Saudi government saw the U.S. forces as a major component of its military defense strategy. Ibn Saud balanced the two perspectives by changing the demands on U.S. forces as danger increased and subsided. At this time, the Cold War was starting, and the U.S. was greatly concerned about Soviet communism and strategized to 'contain' its spread within the Arabian Peninsula. Saudi security was at the top of Washington's list of priorities. The Truman administration promised Bin Saud protection from Soviet influence, and, as a result, the U.S. increased its presence in the region, This greatly strengthened the security relationship between Saudi Arabia and the U.S.

=== Foundation of Aramco ===
The relationship has historically been shaped by security cooperation and energy interests. Throughout the 1950s and 1960s, the relationship between the two nations grew significantly stronger. In 1950, Aramco and Saudi Arabia agreed on a 50/50 profit distribution of the oil discovered in Saudi Arabia. In 1951, the Mutual Defense Assistance Agreement was put into action.This allowed for the U.S. arms trade to Saudi Arabia, along with a United States military training mission centered in Saudi Arabia.

=== King Saud comes to power (1953) ===
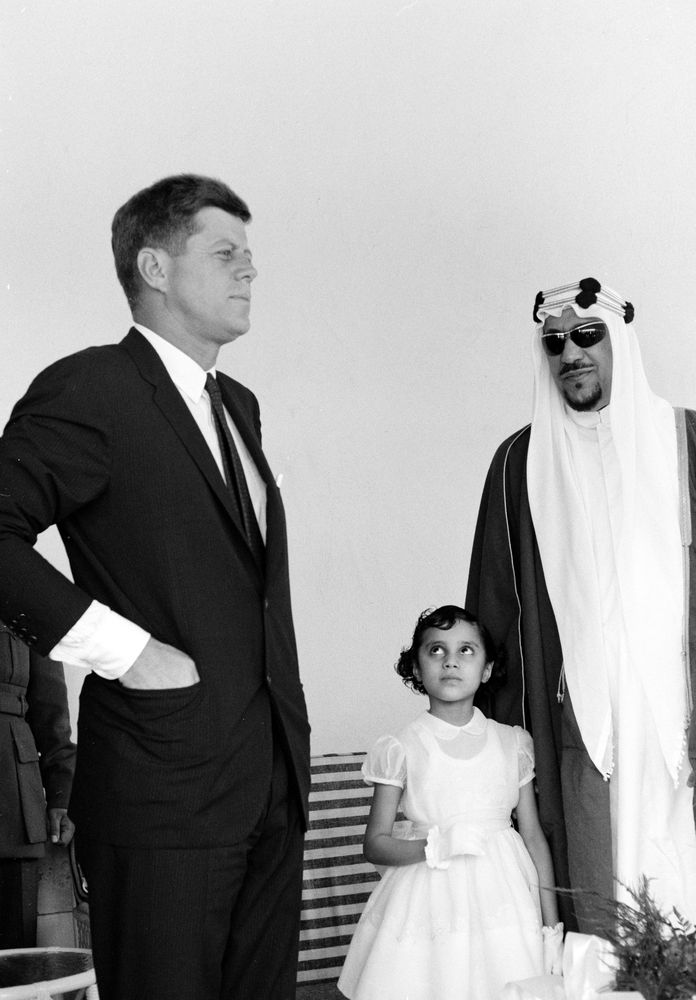
King Saud and John Kennedy meet at the king's mansion in Palm Beach, Florida in 1962

In 1953, King Saud, the eldest son of Ibn Saud, came to power after his father's death. During his reign, U.S.–Saudi relations faced many obstacles concerning the U.S.'s anti-communism strategy. President Dwight D. Eisenhower's new anti-Soviet alliance had combined most of "the kingdom's regional rivals and foes". This heightened Saudi suspicions, and, in October 1955, Saud joined Egyptian president Gamal Abdel Nasser in his pro-Soviet strategy. Furthermore, Saud dismissed the U.S. forces stationed in the Kingdom and replaced them with Egyptian ones. But in 1956, during the Suez Crisis, King Saud decided to start cooperating with the U.S. again after Eisenhower stopped Israeli, British, and French forces from seizing the canal.

=== Cold War and Soviet containment ===
In 1957, Saud decided to renew the U.S. base in Dhahran. But in less than a year, after the Egyptian–Syrian unification in 1958, Egypt returned to its pro-Soviet strategy. Saud once again joined their alliance, which brought U.S.–Saudi relations to a low point. This was especially the case after Saud announced in 1961 that he had changed his mind on renewing the U.S. base. In 1962, however, Egypt then attacked Saudi Arabia from bases in Yemen during the 1962 Yemeni revolution because of Saudi Arabia's anti-revolution propaganda. This caused Saud to seek U.S. support. President John F. Kennedy immediately responded to Saud's request by sending U.S. warplanes in July 1963 to stop the attack. At the end of the war, shortly before Prince Faisal became king, the relationship between the U.S. and Saudi Arabia became healthy again. In 1962, due to international and domestic pressure, President Kennedy put pressure on Saudi Arabia to introduce "modernization reforms", a request which was heavily directed against slavery in Saudi Arabia and resulted in its abolition.

As the United Kingdom withdrew from the Persian Gulf region in the late 1960s and early 1970s, the U.S. was reluctant to take on new security commitments. Instead, the Nixon administration sought to rely on local allies to "police" American interests (see Nixon Doctrine). In the Persian Gulf region, this meant relying on Saudi Arabia and Iran as the "twin pillars" of regional security. Whereas in 1970 the U.S. provided less than $16 million to Saudi Arabia in military aid, by 1972 that number had increased to $312 million. As part of its "twin pillars" strategy, the U.S. also attempted to improve relations between the Saudis and the Iranians. For example, this included persuading Iran to remove its territorial claim to Bahrain. The rise in oil prices during 1970-1971 enabled the Saudi government to increase its U.S. weapons purchases from $15.8 million in 1970 to $312.4 million in 1972.

=== Oil embargo and energy crisis ===
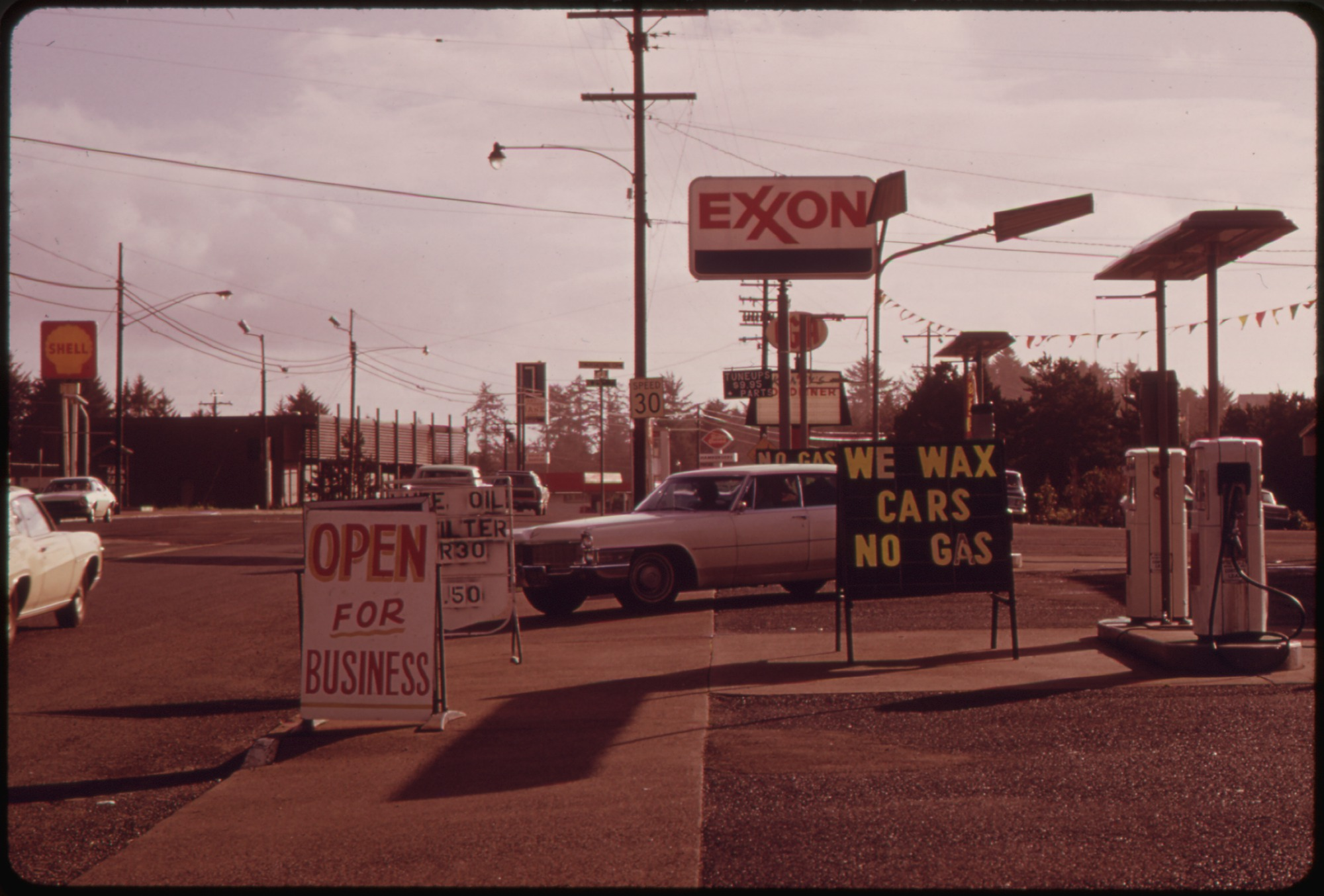
"No Gas" signs in Lincoln city, Oregon, 1973

In November 1964, Faisal became the new king of Saudi Arabia after a conflict with his brother Saud, the erstwhile king. The U.S. was not sure about the outcome of such an unplanned change in the Saudi monarchy. A low point in Saudi-U.S. relations came as Faisal decided to launch an oil embargo against the U.S. and Europe during the Fourth Arab-Israeli War. The oil embargo triggered an energy crisis in the U.S. In an interview with international media, Faisal said, "America's complete Israel support against the Arabs makes it extremely difficult for us to continue to supply the United States with oil, or even remain friends with the United States."

During an OPEC meeting held in Kuwait on October 16, 1973, the governments of Saudi Arabia, Iran, Iraq, Kuwait, Qatar and United Arab Emirates jointly announced a policy to increase the price of oil by 70%. On October 20, 1973, the Saudi government declared a total oil embargo against the United States. Because of Saudi Arabia's close partnership with the U.S. since 1945, King Faisal's decision to launch the oil embargo has become regarded as the most dynamic and aggressive aspect of the crisis.

The oil embargo, which lasted until March 1974, generated the most diplomatic hostility the Saudi-U.S. relationship had seen thus far. American oil companies operating in Saudi Arabia became subjected to the direct supervision of the Saudi government. The policies implemented by the Arab oil-producing countries resulted in a rapid increase in oil prices. As the energy crisis began to adversely impact the American economy, officials from the Nixon administration threatened Saudi Arabia with direct military intervention.

Despite the tensions caused by the oil embargo, the U.S. wished to resume relations with the Saudis. As the economic importance of oil became increasingly emphasized in its bipartisan foreign policy, the U.S. government began pursuing a deeper partnership with Saudi Arabia. The vast oil wealth accumulated from price increases enabled the Saudis to purchase large sums of American military technology. The embargo was lifted in March 1974 after the U.S. pressured Israel into negotiating with Syria over the Golan Heights. Three months later, "Washington and Riyadh signed a wide-ranging agreement on expanded economic and military cooperation." In the 1975 fiscal year, the two countries signed $2 billion worth of military contracts, including an agreement to send Saudi Arabia 60 fighter jets. A key part of the agreement was for Saudi to price oil in terms of dollars, and to invest billions of its dollars in U.S. Treasury notes.

=== 1980s ===
==== Military sales ====
After the initiation of the U.S.-brokered Camp David Accords between Egypt and Israel in 1978, the Saudi and the U.S. governments began to further reduce bilateral rifts and deepen strategic co-operation. Additionally, both Saudi Arabia and the United States shared common geo-political goals such as countering the influence of the Soviet Union during the Cold War. The Saudis' increase in oil production to stabilize the oil price and its support of anti-communism contributed to closer relations with the U.S. In January 1979, the U.S. sent F-15 fighters to Saudi Arabia as part of its anti-communist campaign. Furthermore, the U.S. and Saudi Arabia were both supporting anti-communist groups in Afghanistan and various countries.

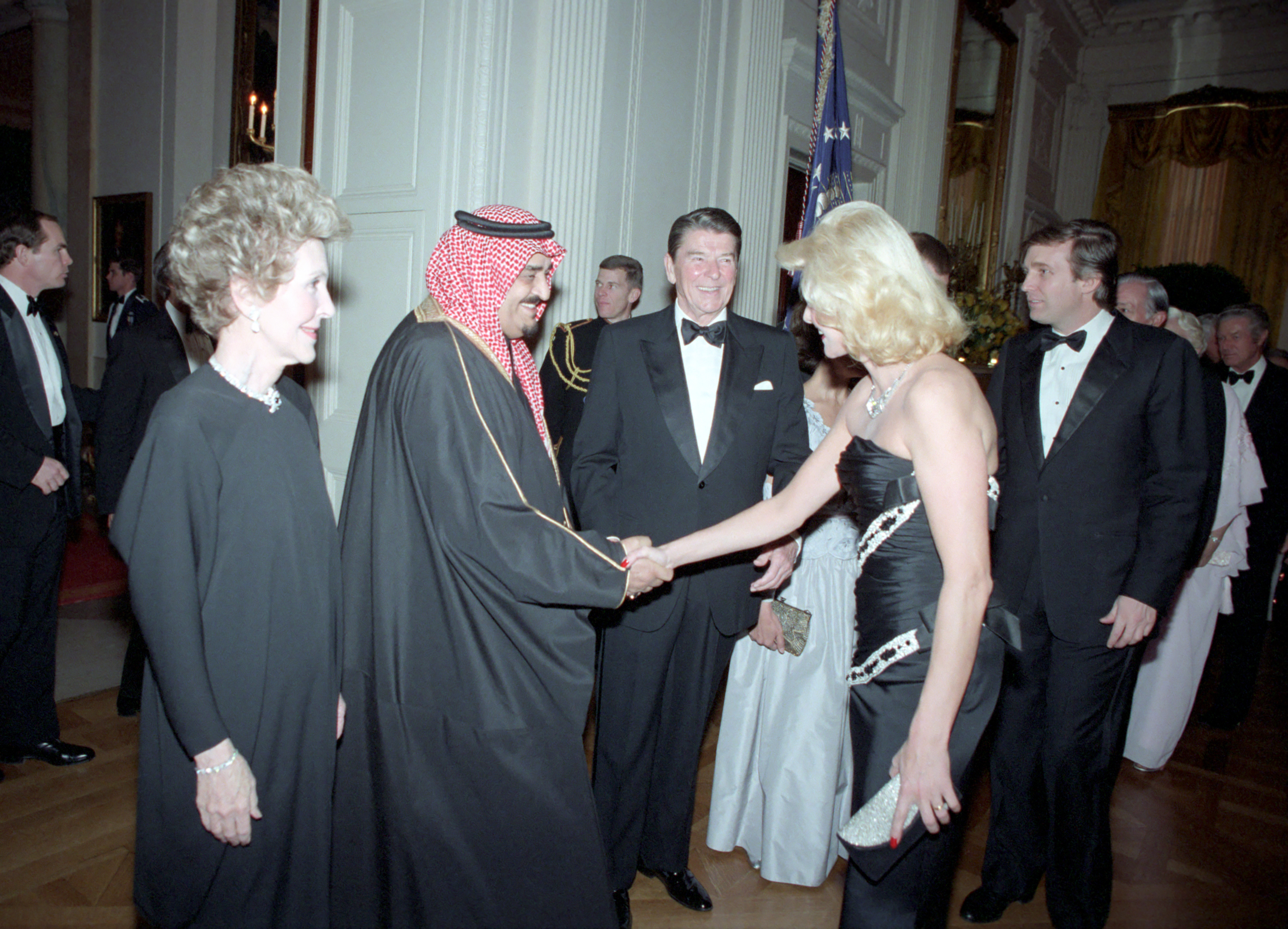
King Fahd with U.S. President Ronald Reagan and Ivana and Donald Trump in 1985. The U.S. and Saudi Arabia supplied money and arms to the anti-Soviet fighters in Afghanistan.

After the Cold War, U.S.–Saudi relations were improving. U.S. and Saudi companies were both actively engaged and paid handsomely for taking on and managing projects in Saudi Arabia. Saudi Arabia transferred $100 billion to the United States for administration, for construction, for weapons and, in the 1970s and 1980s, for higher education scholarships to the U.S. During that era, the U.S. built and administrated numerous military academies, navy ports, and military airbases. Many of these military facilities were influenced by the U.S., with the needs of cold war aircraft and deployment strategies in mind. Also, the Saudis purchased a great deal of weapons that varied from F-15 war planes to M1 Abrams main battle tanks that later proved useful during the Gulf War.

In December 2021, the US Senate voted against a proposal to stop $650 million in sales of advanced medium-range air-to-air missiles to Saudi Arabia. The proposal was meant to discourage Saudi Arabia from its military intervention in Yemen.

==== Joint support to anti-Soviet guerillas ====
After the Soviet invasion of Afghanistan in December 1979, relations between Saudi Arabia and the United States further strengthened as both governments began jointly co-ordinating to assist Afghan resistance militias, which waged guerilla warfare against Soviet occupation forces across Afghanistan.

=== The Gulf War ===
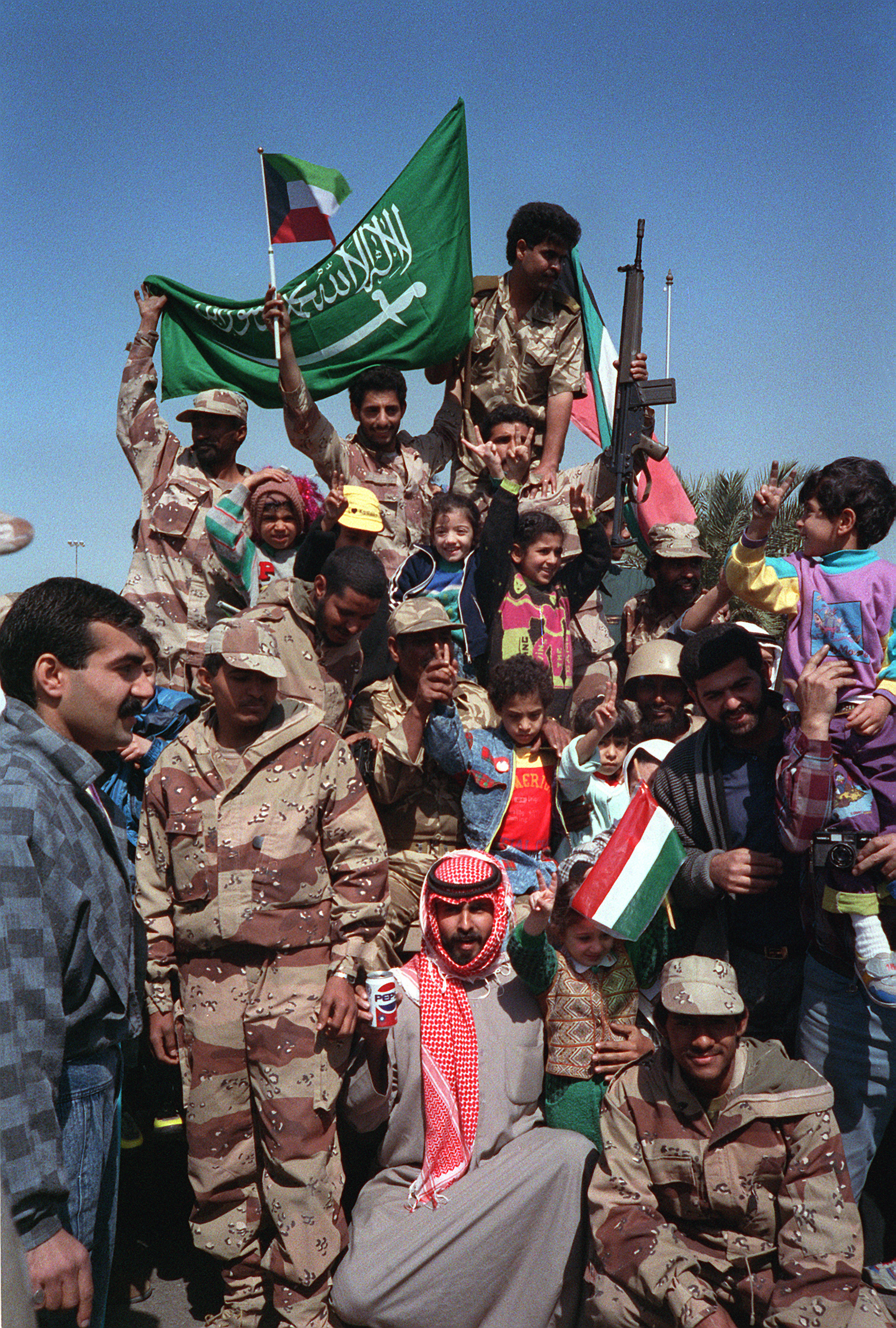
Civilians and coalition military forces wave Kuwaiti and Saudi Arabian flags as they celebrate the retreat of Iraqi forces from Kuwait, February 1991

Relations between the two nations solidified even further when the U.S. sent nearly 500,000 soldiers to Saudi Arabia to aid in protection against Iraq. Following Operation Desert Shield, which was a response by U.S. President George H. W. Bush to Iraq's invasion of Kuwait in 1990, America kept 5,000 troops in Saudi Arabia to maintain their protection and trade relations. The Gulf War of 1990–91, which aligned with the climax of the Cold War, also marked the apex of friendly relations between the governments of Saudi Arabia and the United States.

Iraq's invasion of Kuwait in August 1990 led to the Gulf War, and the security relationship between the U.S. and Saudi Arabia was greatly strengthened during that time. Concurrently with the U.S. invasion, King Fahd declared war against Iraq. The U.S. was concerned about the safety of Saudi Arabia against Saddam's intention to invade and control the oil reserves in the region. As a result, with King Fahd's approval, President Bush deployed a significant amount of American military forces (up to 543,000 ground troops by the end of the operation) to protect Saudi Arabia from a possible Iraqi invasion; this operation was called Desert Shield. Furthermore, the U.S. sent additional troops, with nearly 100,000 Saudi troops sent by Fahd, to form a U.S.–Saudi army alliance. Alongside troops from other allied countries, this alliance was deployed to attack Iraqi troops in Kuwait and to stop further invasion. During the ground campaign of Operation Desert Storm, the Iraqi troops were defeated within four days and retreated back to Iraq.

=== 1990s ===
After the collapse of the Soviet Union in 1991, the United States emerged as the dominant global power and led a unipolar international order until the late 2010s. During the 1990s, Saudi Arabia continued its bilateral partnership with the United States.

After the Gulf War, the U.S. had a continued presence of 5,000 troops stationed in Saudi Arabia—a figure that rose to 10,000 during the 2003 U.S. invasion of Iraq. Operation Southern Watch enforced the no-fly zones over southern Iraq set up after 1991, and the country's oil exports through the shipping lanes of the Persian Gulf are protected by the U.S. Fifth Fleet, based in Bahrain.

=== September 11 attacks ===
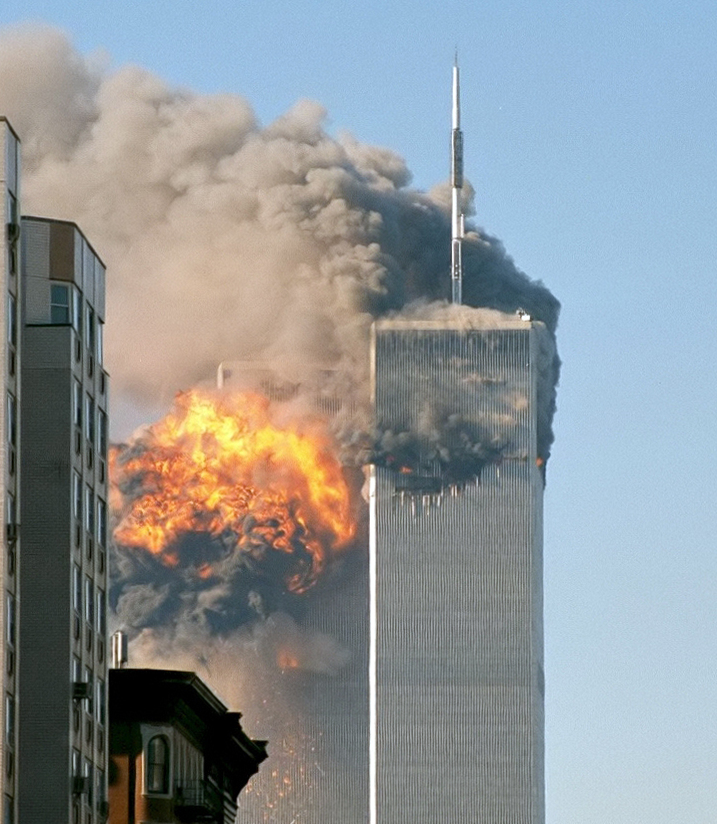
15 out of 19 September 11 terrorists were Saudi Arabian nationals

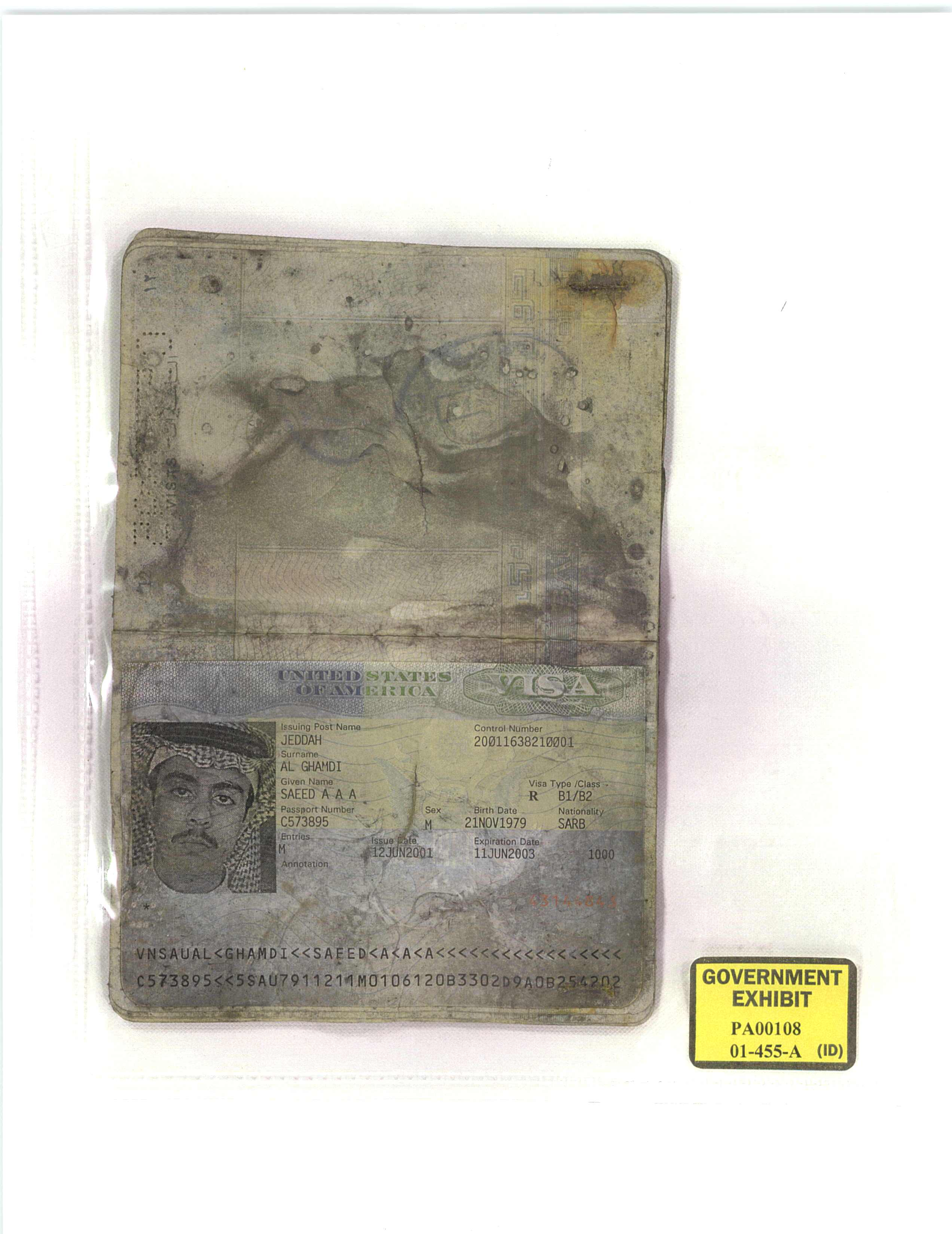
Visa page from Saeed al-Ghamdi's Kingdom of Saudi Arabia passport recovered from the United Airlines Flight 93 crash site

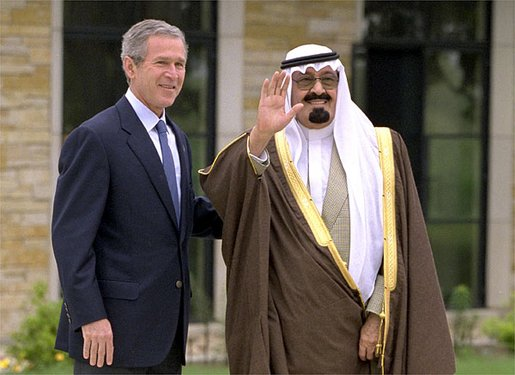
U.S. President George W. Bush and Crown Prince Abdullah of Saudi Arabia in Crawford, Texas, April 25, 2002

On September 11, 2001, terrorist attacks by four hijacked planes, occurred in New York City, Washington, D.C., and in a field near Shanksville, Pennsylvania. The attacks killed 2,977 victims and caused an estimated $150 billion in property and infrastructure damage and economic impact, exceeding the death toll and damage caused by the Japanese attack on Pearl Harbor 60 years earlier. 15 of the 19 hijackers came from Saudi Arabia, as did their leader Osama bin Laden. In the U.S., there followed considerable negative publicity for, and scrutiny of, Saudi Arabia and its teaching of Islam. There was also a reassessment of the "oil-for-security" alliance with the Al Saud. A 2002 Council on Foreign Relations Terrorist Financing Task Force report found that "for years, individuals and charities based in Saudi Arabia have been the most important source of funds for al-Qaeda. And for years, Saudi officials have turned a blind eye to this problem."

In the backlash against Saudi Arabia and Wahhabism, the Saudi government was portrayed in the media, Senate hearings, and elsewhere as:

a sort of oily heart of darkness, the wellspring of a bleak, hostile value system that is the very antithesis of our own. America's seventy-year alliance with the kingdom has been reappraised as a ghastly mistake, a selling of the soul, a gas-addicted alliance with death.

There was even a proposal at the Defense Policy Board, an arm of Department of Defense, to consider 'taking Saudi out of Arabia' by forcibly seizing control of the oil fields, giving the Hijaz back to the Hashemites, and delegating control of Medina and Mecca to a multinational committee of moderate non-Wahhabi Muslims.

Likewise in Saudi Arabia, anti-American sentiment was described as "intense" and "at an all-time high".

A Saudi intelligence survey of "educated Saudis between the ages of 25 and 41" taken shortly after the 9/11 attacks "concluded that 95 percent" of those surveyed supported Bin Laden's cause. (Support for Bin Laden reportedly waned by 2006, and by then the Saudi population become considerably more pro-American after Al-Qaeda linked groups staged attacks inside Saudi Arabia.) The proposal at the Defense Policy Board to "take Saudi out of Arabia" was spread as the secret U.S. plan for the kingdom.

In October 2001, The Wall Street Journal reported that Crown Prince Abdullah sent a critical letter to U.S. President George W. Bush on August 29: "A time comes when peoples and nations part. We are at a crossroads. It is time for the United States and Saudi Arabia to look at their separate interests. Those governments that don't feel the pulse of their people and respond to it will suffer the fate of the Shah of Iran."

For over a year after 9/11, Saudi Minister of the Interior (a powerful post whose jurisdiction included domestic intelligence gathering) Prince Nayef bin Abdulaziz Al Saud, insisted that the Saudi hijackers were dupes in a Zionist plot. In December 2002, a Saudi government spokesman declared that his country was the victim of unwarranted American intolerance bordering on hate.

In 2003, several terror attacks occurred which targeted U.S. compounds, the Saudi ministry of interior, and several other places inside Saudi Arabia. As a result of these attacks, the U.S. decided to redevelop Saudi law enforcement agencies by providing them with anti-terrorism education, the latest technologies, and interactions with U.S. law enforcement agencies.

American politicians and media have accused the Saudi government of supporting terrorism and tolerating a jihadist culture. They noted that Osama bin Laden and fifteen out of the nineteen (or 78 percent of) 9/11 hijackers were from Saudi Arabia.

Some analysts have speculated that Osama bin Laden, who had his Saudi nationality revoked in 1994 and was expelled, had chosen 15 Saudi hijackers on purpose to break up U.S.–Saudi relations, as the U.S. was still suspicious of Saudi Arabia. The Saudis decided to cooperate with the U.S. on its war on terror. "Terrorism does not belong to any culture, or religion, or political system", said King Abdullah at the opening address of the Counter-terrorism International Conference (CTIC) held in Riyadh in 2005. The cooperation grew broader and covered financial, educational, and technological aspects both in Saudi Arabia and Muslim-like countries to prevent pro-Al-Qaeda terrorists' activities and ideologies. "It is a high time for the Ulma (Muslim Scholars), and all thinkers, intellectuals, and academics, to shoulder their responsibilities towards the enlightenment of the people, especially the young people, and protect them from deviant ideas" said Sheikh Saleh bin Abdulaziz Alsheikh, Minister of Islamic Affairs, in the CTIC.

Almost all members of the CTIC agreed that Al-Qaeda targeted less educated Muslims by convincing them that they are warriors of God but used them only to accomplish their political goals. Three years after the Saudi government took a serious and active role in anti-terrorism, Al-Qaeda began launching multiple attacks targeting Saudi government buildings and U.S. compounds on Saudi grounds. These attacks tried to corrode and destroy the U.S.–Saudi relationship and also exhibited Al-Qaeda's desire for revenge against Saudi Arabia for its co-operation with US anti-terrorism.

After these changes, the Saudi government was better prepared in preventing terrorist activities. They caught a large number of Saudi terrorists and terrorists from other countries (some of them American) that had connections with al-Qaeda in one way or another. Some of these criminals held a high rank in their respective terrorist organizations, which helped diffuse many terrorist cells. In a matter of months, Saudi law enforcement officials were successfully able to stop and prevent terrorist activities. Also, they were successful in finding the source of terrorist financing.

In March 2018, a U.S. judge formally allowed a lawsuit, brought by 9/11 survivors and victim's families, to move forward against the Saudi Arabian government.

In May 2021, 22 federal lawmakers from New York and New Jersey pressured President Joe Biden to release the classified FBI documents that cite the role of Saudi Arabia in the 9/11 terror attacks. In their letter to the US Attorney General Merrick Garland, the lawmakers' Ione Republican Nicole Malliotakis and NY Sens. Chuck Schumer and Kirsten Gillibrand challenged the "state secrets privilege" that was invoked by former US Presidents to restrict the classified FBI report from being released. The evidence of Saudi Arabian involvement in the September 11 attacks first surfaced in a 2012 FBI memo during the Operation Encore investigation.

=== 2013 rift ===
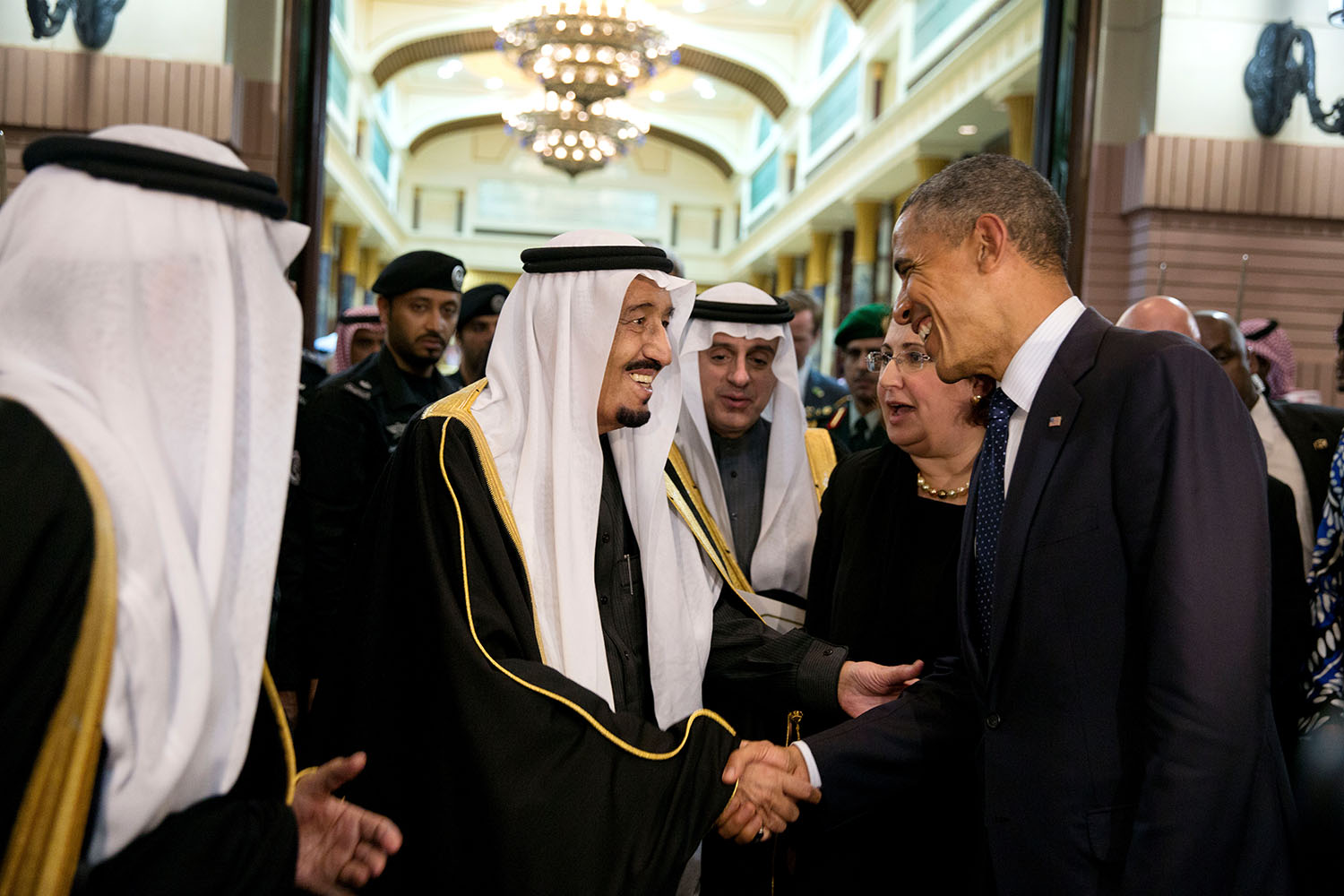
U.S. President Barack Obama shakes hands with King Salman in Riyadh, January 2015

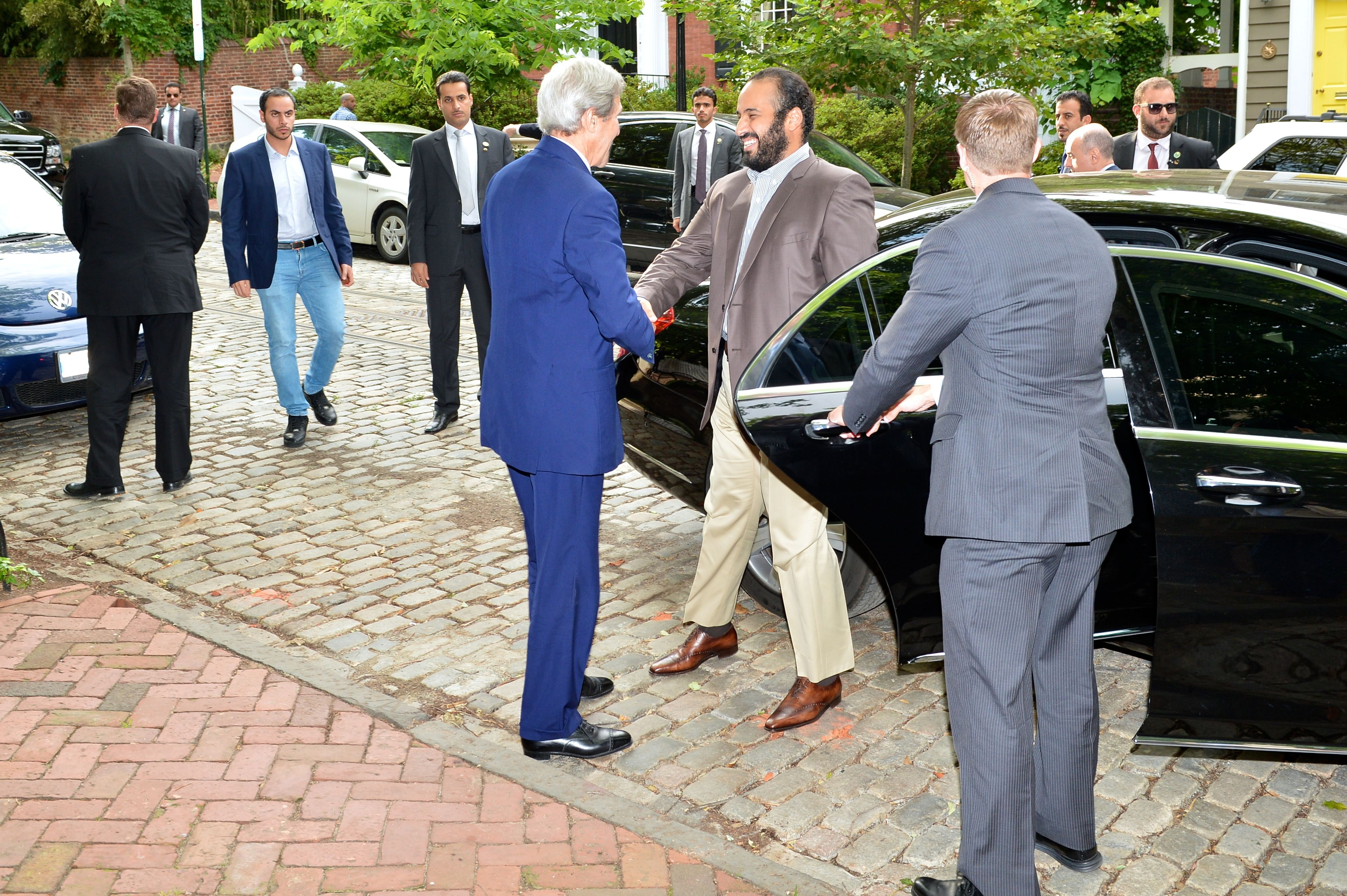
Prince Mohammad bin Salman with U.S. Secretary of State John Kerry in Washington, D.C., June 13, 2016

After the year 2000, the United States developed techniques to recover oil and gas much more efficiently and soon became an energy exporter. Instead of depending on purchases of Middle Eastern oil and gas, the U.S. became a rival. Alwaleed bin Talal warned Saudi ministers in May 2013 that shale gas production in the U.S. would eventually pose a threat to the kingdom's oil-dependent economy. Despite this, the two countries still maintained a positive relationship.

In October 2013, Saudi intelligence chief Prince Bandar bin Sultan suggested a distancing in Saudi Arabia–United States relations as a result of differences over the Syrian civil war and diplomatic overtures between Iran and the Obama administration. The Saudis rejected a rotating seat on the UN Security Council that month (despite previously campaigning for such a seat) in protest of American policy on those issues.

Saudi Arabia was cautiously supportive of a Western-negotiated interim agreement with Iran over its nuclear program. President Obama called King Abdullah to brief him about the agreement, and the White House said the leaders agreed to "consult regularly" about the U.S.'s negotiations with Iran.

The relationship between Saudi Arabia and the United States declined during the last years of the Obama administration. This was despite Obama's authorization of US forces to provide logistical and intelligence support to the Saudis in their military intervention in Yemen, the establishment of a joint coordination planning cell with the Saudi military that helped manage the war, and the CIA's usage of Saudi bases for drone assassinations in Yemen.

=== 2016 U.S. presidential election ===
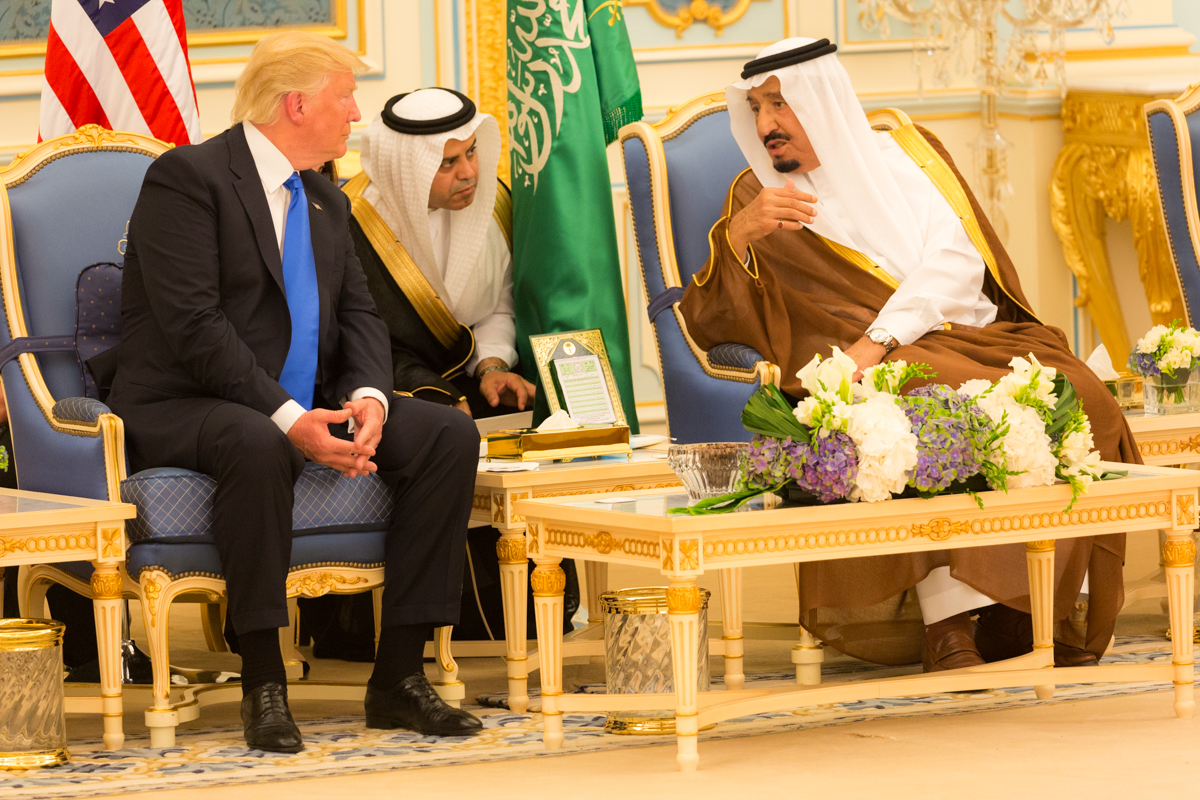
U.S. President Donald Trump with the King of Saudi Arabia Salman bin Abdulaziz Al Saud in Riyadh at the 2017 Riyadh Summit in May 2017.

In August 2016, Donald Trump Jr. had a meeting with an envoy representing Saudi Arabia's Crown Prince and de facto ruler Mohammad bin Salman and Mohammed bin Zayed Al Nahyan, the Crown Prince of Abu Dhabi. The envoy offered to help the Trump presidential campaign, which would have been illegal under U.S. law. The meeting included Lebanese-American lobbyist George Nader, Joel Zamel, who was an Israeli specialist in social media manipulation, and Blackwater founder Erik Prince.

Special Counsel Robert Mueller investigated the Trump campaign's possible ties to Saudi Arabia. Lebanese-American businessman Ahmad Khawaja claimed that Saudi Arabia and UAE illegally funneled millions of dollars into Trump's campaign.

In April 2017, U.S. President Donald J. Trump attempted to repair the United States' relationship with Saudi Arabia by having the U.S. Defense Secretary visit the country. Trump has stated that he aimed to assist Saudi Arabia in terms of military protection in exchange for beneficial economic compensation for the United States.

Trump made his first trip as president outside the U.S. to Saudi Arabia arriving at King Khalid International Airport on May 20, where he met with King of Saudi Arabia Salman bin Abdulaziz Al Saud.

=== 2017 arms deal and war in Yemen ===
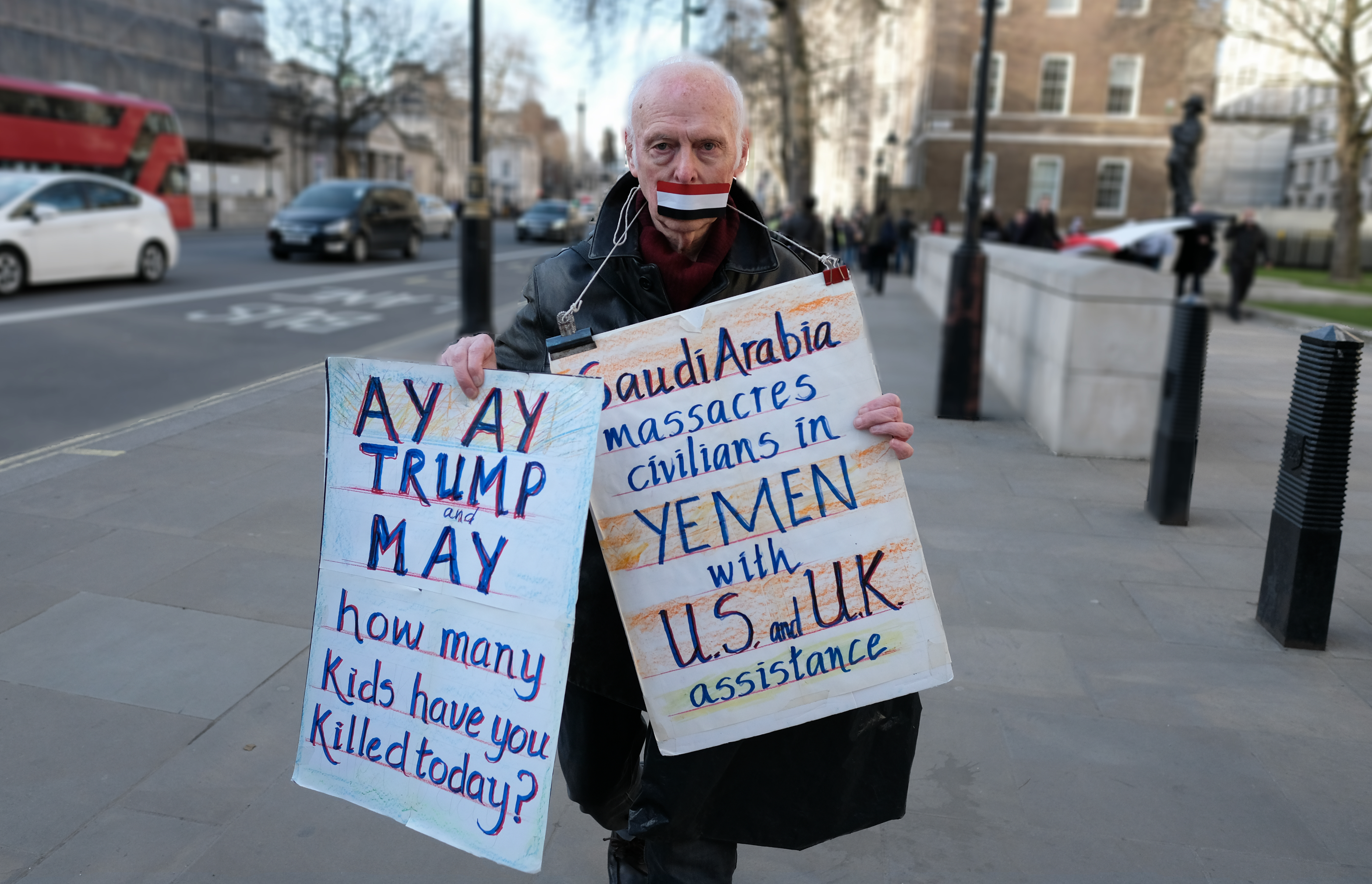
Protest against U.S. involvement in the Saudi Arabian-led intervention in Yemen, March 2018

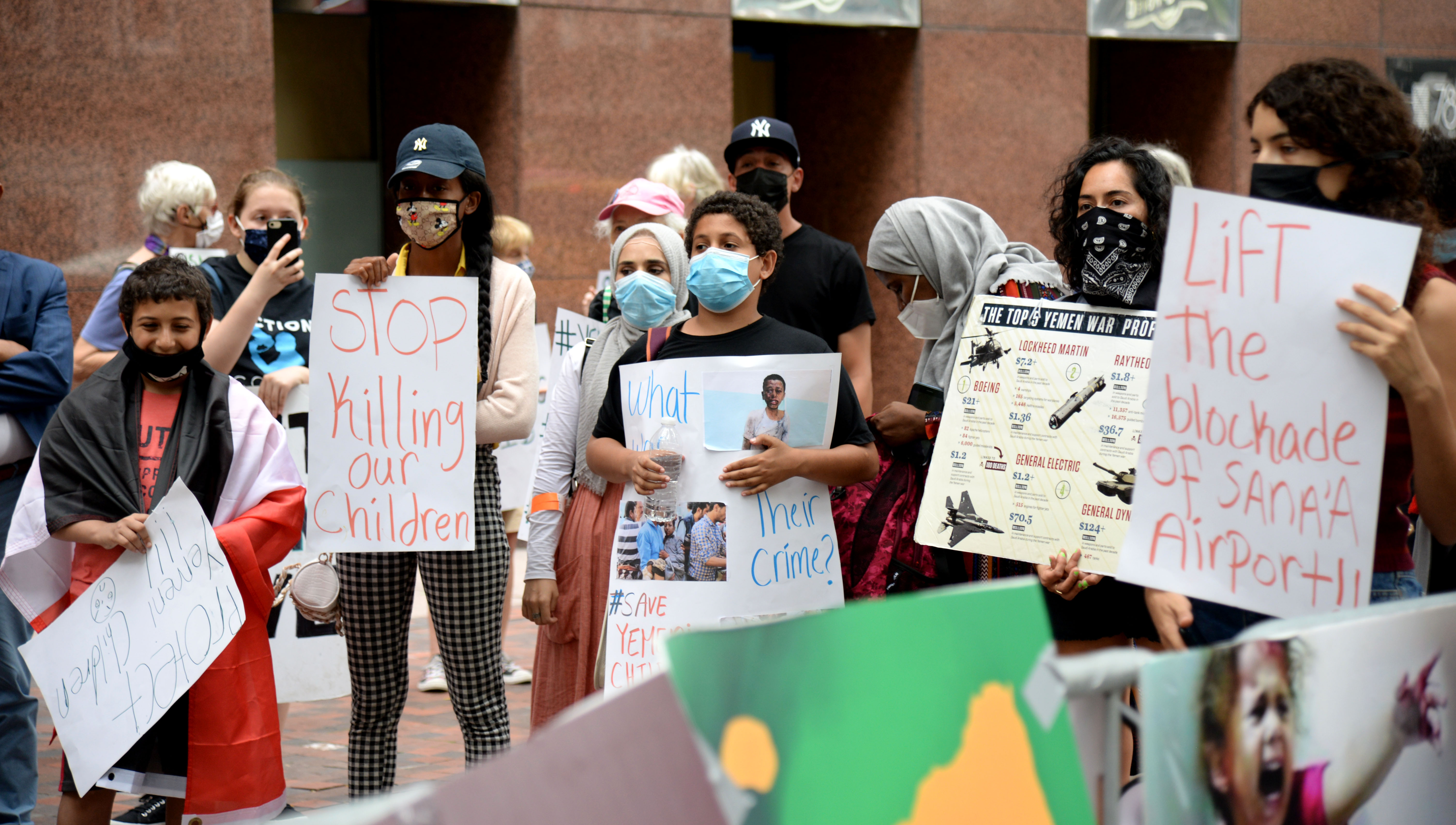
Protest against the war in Yemen in New York City on August 14, 2020

Significant numbers of Americans have criticized the conduct of Saudi Arabia in its ongoing intervention in the Yemeni Civil War. This includes alleged war crimes such as bombing hospitals, gas stations, water infrastructure, marketplaces and other groups of civilians, and archaeological monuments; declaring the entire Saada Governorate a military target; using cluster bombs; and enforcing a blockade of food and medical supplies that has triggered a famine. Critics oppose U.S. support of Saudi Arabia for this operation, which they say does not benefit U.S. national security interests. They also object to the United States selling arms to Saudi Arabia for use in Yemen.

The approval of the 2017 arms deal was opposed by various lawmakers, including GOP Senators Mike Lee, Rand Paul, Todd Young and Dean Heller along with most Democrat Senators who voted to advance the measure to block the sale and cited the human rights violations by Saudi Arabia in the Yemeni Civil War. Among the senators who voted against moving the measure to block the sale were Democratic Senators Joe Donnelly, Claire McCaskill, Bill Nelson, Joe Manchin and Mark Warner along with top Republicans, including Majority Leader Mitch McConnell, Bob Corker and John McCain.

Tulsi Gabbard, a Democratic Representative from Hawaii, criticized the move, saying that Saudi Arabia is "a country with a devastating record of human rights violations at home and abroad, and a long history of providing support to terrorist organizations that threaten the American people". Rand Paul introduced a bill to try to block the plan calling it a "travesty".

U.S. Senator Chris Murphy accused the United States of complicity in Yemen's humanitarian crisis, saying: "Thousands and thousands inside Yemen today are dying. ... This horror is caused in part by our decision to facilitate a bombing campaign that is murdering children and to endorse a Saudi strategy inside Yemen that is deliberately using disease and starvation and the withdrawal of humanitarian support as a tactic."

A June 2022 report by The Washington Post and the Security Force Monitor at Columbia Law School's Human Rights Institute stated that a "substantial portion" of airstrikes by the Saudi-led campaign were "carried out by jets developed, maintained and sold by U.S. companies, and by pilots who were trained by the US military". According to analysis by the U.S.-based Armed Conflict Location and Event Data Project (ACLED), airstrikes by the Saudi-led coalition have killed 24,000 people, including 9,000 civilians.

=== Jamal Khashoggi assassination ===
In October 2018, the assassination of Jamal Khashoggi put the U.S. into a difficult situation as Trump and his son-in-law Jared Kushner share a strong personal and official bond with Mohammad bin Salman. During an interview, Trump vowed to get to the bottom of the case and that there would be "severe punishment" if the Saudi kingdom was found to be involved in the disappearance or assassination of the journalist. Citing the oil-rich kingdom's "influential and vital role in the global economy", the Saudi Foreign Ministry vexedly replied that if Saudi Arabia "receives any action, it will respond with greater action."

After weeks of denial, Saudi Arabia accepted that Khashoggi died at the Saudi consulate in Istanbul during a "fistfight." Adel al-Jubeir described the journalist's death as a "murder" and a "tremendous mistake.", but he denied the knowledge of whereabouts of the body. Following the case, the U.S. promised to revoke the visas of Saudi nationals responsible for Khashoggi's death.

In November 2018, Trump defended Saudi Arabia, despite the country's involvement in the killing of Jamal Khashoggi. Due to the circumstances at the time, experts said it was impossible for Mohammad bin Salman to visit Washington or have a direct relationship with the Trump administration.

However, in November 2018, relations between the United States and Saudi Arabia re-strengthened when Trump nominated John Abizaid, a retired U.S. army general who spoke Arabic, as U.S. ambassador to the country. Saudi Arabia also brought a fresh face on board by appointing their first female ambassador, Princess Reema bint Bandar Al Saud, to help calm relations in the wake of Khashoggi's death.

On December 12, 2018, the United States Senate Committee on Foreign Relations approved a resolution to suspend Yemen conflict-related weapon sales to Saudi Arabia and to impose sanctions on people obstructing humanitarian access in Yemen. Senator Lindsey Graham said, "This sends a global message that just because you're an ally of the United States, you can't kill with impunity. The relationship with Saudi Arabia is not working for America. It is more of a burden than an asset."

On April 8, 2019, U.S. Secretary of State Mike Pompeo announced that 16 Saudi nationals involved in Khashoggi's murder, including Mohammed bin Salman's close aid Saud al-Qahtani, have been barred from entering the U.S.

=== 2019 arms legislation ===
In the wake of Saudi Arabia's declining human rights record, on July 17, 2019, lawmakers in Washington backed a resolution to block the sale of precision-guided munitions to the Kingdom of Saudi Arabia and the United Arab Emirates. The measure would have denied billions of dollars in weapon sales to the Saudi-led intervention in Yemen where thousands have been killed in the 4-year long war. President Trump vetoed three such resolutions, which did not have the two-thirds majority support in the Senate to override his vetoes.

On August 3, 2020, Democrats in the United States Congress issued subpoenas in probe of the U.S. Arms Sales to Saudi Arabia and the United Arab Emirates. Democrats demanded that State Department officials testify as part of an investigation into a 2019 arms sale and the dismissal of the State Department's inspector general, Steve Linick, by President Donald Trump in May on Mike Pompeo's advice.

On August 11, 2020, U.S. Secretary of State Mike Pompeo was cleared of charges of wrongdoing in a disputed arms sale to Saudi Arabia and the United Arab Emirates. He had been accused of abuse of power after he used an obscure emergency procedure to bypass congressional refusal to approve an $8 billion arms sale to Saudi Arabia, the United Arab Emirates and Jordan in May 2019.

=== Pensacola shooting ===
On December 6, 2019, an aviation student from Saudi Arabia Mohammed Saeed Alshamrani shot three people dead and injured eight others in a terrorist attack at the U.S. Naval Air Station Pensacola in Florida. Alshamrani himself was a second lieutenant in the Royal Saudi Air Force who was participating in a training program sponsored by the Pentagon as part of a security cooperation agreement with Saudi Arabia. Later, the United States Navy suspended flight training for all Saudi military aviation students pending the results of the FBI investigation. Their training resumed in late February 2020 after the United States Marine Corps and Navy implemented increased security measures with respect to foreign trainees.

=== Coronavirus outbreak ===
On July 3, 2020, it was reported that dozens of American diplomats would leave Saudi Arabia along with their families, due to the kingdom's failure at containing the coronavirus outbreak as its economy reopened. Some of the diplomats believed that the government of Saudi Arabia may have been underreporting the number of coronavirus cases by the thousands.

=== 2023 Jeddah shooting ===
On 28 June 2023, a gunman attacked the security forces near the US consulate in Jeddah, killing a member of the local guard force at the consulate. Saudi security forces killed the attacker.

=== Saudi Arabia–United States Civil Nuclear Agreement ===
On July 22, 2026, the United States and Saudi Arabia signed an agreement that will provide the kingdom with uranium enrichment capability for its civilian nuclear program. The deal will last 30 years and is also expected to involve U.S. firms in developing the program. The deal would allow for the building of a uranium enrichment facility in Saudi Arabia. The agreement does not include the IAEA's "Additional Protocol" which grants the United Nations' International Atomic Energy Agency broad and more intrusive oversight of a country's nuclear activities, such as the power to carry out snap inspections at undeclared locations. US President Donald Trump demanded that Saudi Arabia join the Abraham Accords so that the agreement will take effect.

== Other controversies ==
=== First conflict ===
While the U.S.–Saudi relationship was growing, their first conflict began when disorder broke out between the Jews and Arabs in April 1936 in the British-administrated Palestine mandate. The U.S. favored the establishment of an independent Israeli state, but Saudi Arabia, the leading nation in the Islamic and Arab world, supported the Arab position. The U.S.'s oil interest in Saudi Arabia could be held hostage depending on the circumstances of the conflict. U.S. President Franklin D. Roosevelt sent the king a letter indicating that, while it is true that the U.S. supported the establishment of a Jewish state in Palestine, the U.S. is not in any way responsible for the establishment. Ibn Saud was convinced by the message and U.S.–Saudi relations began to run smoothly again. Moreover, in March 1938, CASCO made a big oil discovery in Saudi Arabia which boomed the oil industry in the country. Coincidentally, the U.S. became more interested in Saudi oil. As a result, on February 4, 1940, as World War II was approaching, the U.S. had established a diplomatic presence in Saudi Arabia in order to have closer relations with the Saudis and to offer protection. Bert Fish, former ambassador in Egypt, was elected as the U.S. ambassador in Jeddah.

=== Petrodollar power ===
The United States dollar is the de facto world currency. The petrodollar system originated in the early 1970s in the wake of the Bretton Woods collapse. President Richard Nixon and his Secretary of State, Henry Kissinger, feared that the abandonment of the international gold standard under the Bretton Woods arrangement (combined with a growing U.S. trade deficit, and massive debt associated with the ongoing Vietnam War) would cause a decline in the relative global demand for the U.S. dollar. In a series of meetings, the United States and the Saudi royal family made an agreement. The United States would offer military protection for Saudi Arabia's oil fields, and in return the Saudi's would price their oil sales exclusively in United States dollars (in other words, the Saudis were to refuse all other currencies, except the U.S. dollar, as payment for their oil exports).

=== Child abduction ===
The international abduction of American children to Saudi Arabia provoked sustained criticism and resulted in a congressional hearing in 2002 where parents of children held in Saudi Arabia gave impassioned testimony related to the abduction of their children. Washington-based Insight ran a series of articles on international abduction during the same period and highlighted Saudi Arabia a number of times.

=== Allegations of funding terrorism ===
According to a 2009 U.S. State Department communication by Hillary Clinton, United States Secretary of State, (disclosed as part of the Wikileaks U.S. 'cables leaks' controversy in 2010) "donors in Saudi Arabia constitute the most significant source of funding to Sunni terrorist groups worldwide". Part of this funding arises through the zakat (an act of charity dictated by Islam) paid by all Saudis to charities and amounts to at least 2.5% of their income. Although many charities are genuine, others allegedly serve as fronts for money laundering and terrorist financing operations. While many Saudis contribute to those charities in good faith believing their money goes toward good causes, it has been alleged that others know full well the terrorist purposes to which their money will be applied.

In September 2016, Congress passed the Justice Against Sponsors of Terrorism Act that would allow relatives of victims of the September 11 attacks to sue Saudi Arabia for its government's alleged role in the attacks.

Saudi Arabia was involved in the CIA-led Timber Sycamore covert operation to train and arm Syrian rebels. Some American officials worried that Syrian rebels being supported had ties to al-Qaeda. In October 2015, Saudi Arabia delivered 500 U.S.-made TOW anti-tank missiles to anti-Assad rebels. Reports indicate that some TOW missiles have ended up in the hands of al-Qaeda in Syria and the Islamic State.

=== Human rights of Saudi Arabia ===
Democratic Rep. Jamie Raskin initiated a letter to Crown Prince of Saudi Arabia Mohammad bin Salman which called for him to release all political prisoners. The letter was backed by 21 Democratic House representatives and one Republican lawmaker.

==== Freedom of religion ====
In the 2018 the State Department Report on International Religious Freedom, Ambassador at Large Sam Brownback condemned the Saudi Arabia for its religious freedom abuses. Brownback described Saudi Arabia as "one of the worst actors in the world on religious persecution" and hoped to see "actions take place in a positive direction". The report detailed discrimination against and maltreatment of Shiite Muslims in Saudi Arabia. The report cites the mass execution of 34 individuals in April 2019, out of which a majority were Shiite Muslims.

=== Saudi Royals in the United States ===
Some members of the Saudi Royal family are known to have committed serious crimes in the United States. Princess Meshael Alayban was involved in human trafficking for a long time.

Princess Bunia assaulted her staff on many occasions.

=== Extradition issues ===
Saudi Arabia does not have an extradition treaty with the United States. The Saudi government has on numerous occasions been actively involved with helping Saudi citizens flee the United States after they have committed serious crimes. In 2019, U.S. federal law enforcement officials launched an investigation into cases involving the disappearance of Saudi Arabian students from Oregon and other parts of the country who faced charges in the U.S. During the investigation, it was speculated that the Saudi government helped the students escape from the U.S. In October 2019, the U.S. Senate passed a bill by Sen. Ron Wyden of Oregon, which required the FBI to declassify any information regarding Saudi Arabia's possible role. Oregon officials demand extradition of these suspects by Saudi Arabia since they were involved in violent crimes causing bodily harm and death.

On September 25, 2020, the government of Saudi Arabia, through the Saudi Arabian consulate in Houston, Texas, offered a bond worth $500,000 as a cashier's check to the Tulsa County Sheriff Office in order to bail out Omar Ba-Abbad, an Uber driver charged with the first-degree murder of a passenger in June 2020. Ba-Abbad was driving for a cab service provider, Uber, in June, when he got into a fight with a passenger, Jeremy Shadrick. Ba-Abbad ran over Shadrick in the fight, killing him as a result. Ba-Abbad has claimed in his defense that his act was out of self-defense. However, the District Attorney contradicted his claim with video evidence proving otherwise.

== Trade relations ==
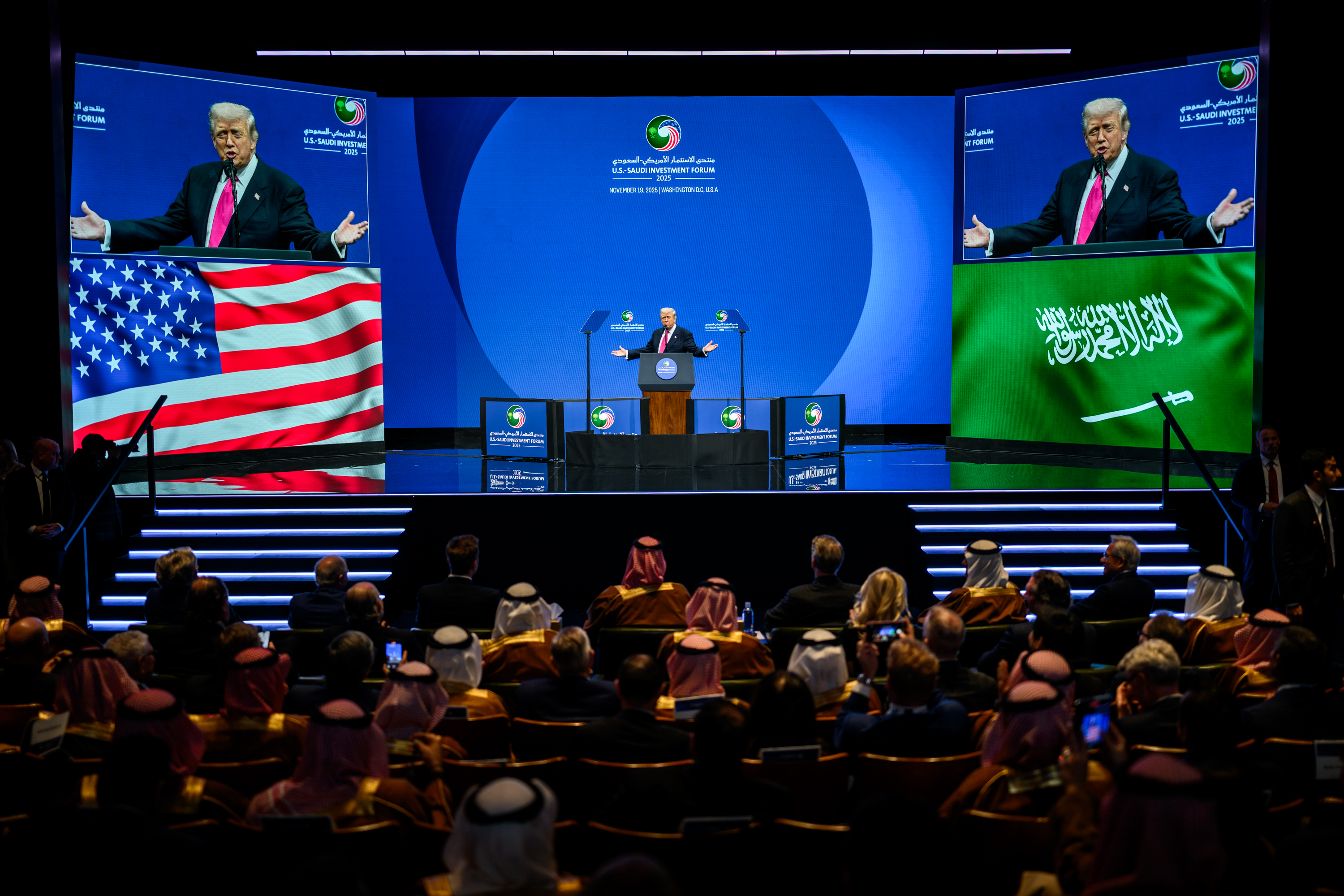
Donald Trump delivers remarks at the U.S.-Saudi Investment Forum in November 2025

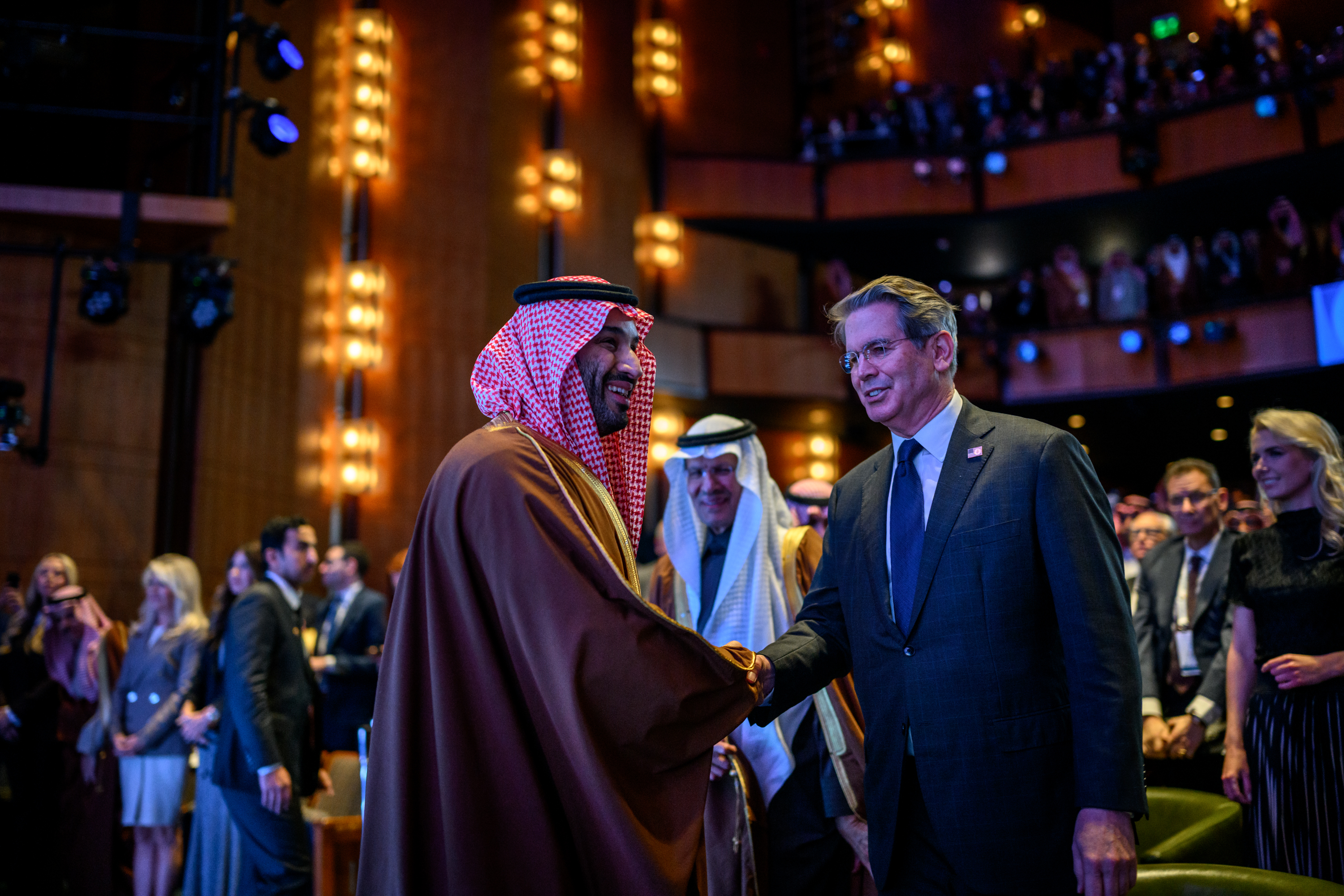
Saudi Crown Prince Mohammed bin Salman with U.S. Secretary of the Treasury Scott Bessent in Washington, D.C, November 19, 2025

=== Energy and oil ===
From the early 20th century, Saudi Arabia has been an enticing trade partner for the United States. The biggest commodity traded between the two nations is petroleum. The strength of the relationship is notoriously attributed to the United States' demand for oil throughout the post modern era; approximately 10,000 barrels of petroleum are imported daily to United States since 2012 ("U.S. Total Crude Oil and Products Imports"). Saudi Arabia has consistently been in need of weapons, reinforcement, and arms due to the consistent rising tensions throughout the Middle East during the late 20th century and early 21st century. Post 2016, the United States of America has continued to trade with Saudi Arabia, mainly for their oil related goods. Using the 1992 revision of the HS (Harmonized System) classification, the top exports of Saudi Arabia are Crude Petroleum ($96.1 billion), Refined Petroleum ($13bn), Ethylene Polymers($10.1bn), Propylene Polymers ($4.93bn) and Ethers ($3.6bn). Its top imports are Cars ($11.8B), Planes, Helicopters, and/or Spacecraft ($3.48bn), Packaged Medicaments ($3.34bn), Broadcasting Equipment ($3.27bn) and Aircraft Parts ($2.18bn)".

On August 9, 2020, Saudi Arabia announced that it would cut down on oil supply to the U.S. for the third time in one year, in an attempt to suppress stockpiles in the global oil market in order to rebalance supply and demand. However, experts claimed that while the strategy worked in 2017 when the demand for oil was high, there are challenges and risks at the present time, due to the impact of the ongoing coronavirus crisis on oil demand.

In August 2021, President Joe Biden's national security adviser Jake Sullivan released a statement calling on OPEC+ to boost oil production to "offset previous production cuts that OPEC+ imposed during the pandemic until well into 2022." On September 28, 2021, Sullivan met with Saudi Crown Prince Mohammed bin Salman in Saudi Arabia to discuss the high oil prices. In late 2021, U.S. Energy Secretary Jennifer Granholm blamed the OPEC oil cartel, led by Saudi Arabia, for rising motor fuel prices in the United States. As the Financial Times reported on November 4: "The White House has said OPEC+ risks imperiling the global economic recovery by refusing to speed up oil production increases and warned the U.S. was prepared to use 'all tools' necessary to lower fuel prices."

In March 2022, Saudi Arabia declined requests from the United States to increase its oil production. U.S.-Saudi relations had been strained over the Biden administration's lack of support for the Saudi Arabian–led intervention in Yemen. In April 2022, CIA Director William Burns traveled to Saudi Arabia to meet with bin Salman and ask him to increase the country's oil production.

In October 2022, in response to American objections, Saudi Arabia implied that the US was motivated by short-term political considerations of having lower gas prices during the midterm elections. The US protested that Saudi Arabia was helping Russia's invasion of Ukraine by undermining sanctions, and US National Security Council spokesman John Kirby said "we are re-evaluating our relationship with Saudi Arabia in light of these actions."

In 2017, Saudi Arabia was the U.S.'s 20th biggest export market and its 21st biggest import market. That year, the most exported goods to Saudi Arabia were "aircraft ($3.6 billion), vehicles ($2.6 billion), machinery ($2.2 billion), electrical machinery ($1.6 billion), and arms and ammunition ($1.4 billion). U.S. exports to Saudi Arabia declined approximately nine percent in 2017 compared to 2016. However, 2017 exports represented a 57% increase compared to 2007. Imports to the U.S. from Saudi Arabia increased approximately 11 percent from 2017 to 2018. However, this represented an overall decline of 47% compared to 2007. What the U.S. imports from Saudi Arabia has not changed much over the years: "The top import categories (2-digit HS) in 2017 were: mineral fuels ($18 billion), organic chemicals ($303 million), special other (returns) ($247 million), aluminum ($164 million), and fertilizers ($148 million)".

Despite the disagreements throughout their relationship, the U.S. and Saudi Arabia have never stopped being trading partners. During the Syrian Civil War, Saudi Arabia expressed disapproval of the United States' lack of action in eradicating Syrian President Bashar al-Assad. The United States has consistently expressed disapproval of Saudi Arabia's treatment of women. Trade volumes between the U.S. and Saudi Arabia topped out around 2012 and have slightly fluctuated since, but the overall trend has been positive. In 2001, U.S. exports (in millions of U.S. dollars) were at $5,957.60 and imports were at $13,272.20. In 2012, these numbers were $17,961.20 in exports and $55,667.00 in imports.

Out of all issues, the September 11 attacks caused the greatest harm to U.S.-Saudi trade relations, due to Saudi Arabia's alleged involvement. Tensions also rose between the two nations throughout Barack Obama's presidency when the U.S. removed oil sanctions on Iran and allowed them to sell their oil to the U.S. The relationship was also hindered by the oil market crash of 2014. This was propelled by increased shale oil production in the United States and caused Saudi Arabian oil exports to decrease by nearly fifty percent. Oil went from around $110 a barrel prior to the 2014 crash to about $27 a barrel by the beginning of 2016. The trade relationship worsened after the U.S. Congress passed a bill in 2016 that allowed victims of the 9/11 attacks to sue the Saudi Arabian government for their losses.

=== Recent years ===
Since 2017, U.S.–Saudi trade and investment relations have experienced significant developments, marked by major defense agreements, fluctuating trade volumes, and investment initiatives. In 2017, the U.S. and Saudi Arabia engaged in substantial trade activities, with U.S. goods exports to Saudi Arabia valued at over $16.4 billion and imports from the kingdom exceeding $18.8 billion. By 2023, U.S. exports slightly decreased to $14.7 billion, primarily comprising cars, aircraft, and gas turbines, while imports from Saudi Arabia stood at $16.5 billion, dominated by crude and refined petroleum products. In 2024, the total goods trade between the two nations was approximately $25.9 billion, with the U.S. maintaining a trade surplus of $443.3 million.

A pivotal moment in U.S.–Saudi relations occurred in May 2017 when President Donald Trump and King Salman bin Abdulaziz Al Saud signed a series of letters of intent for Saudi Arabia to purchase arms from the U.S., totaling $110 billion immediately and $350 billion over ten years. This agreement encompassed tanks, combat ships, missile defense systems, and cybersecurity technology, aiming to bolster Saudi defense capabilities and counter regional threats. In 2023, Saudi Arabia's Public Investment Fund (PIF) made a significant move by ordering up to 121 Boeing 787 Dreamliner aircraft for its new airline, Riyadh Air, and the existing Saudia Airlines, in a deal estimated at nearly $37 billion. This investment underscored Saudi Arabia's commitment to expanding its aviation sector and strengthening economic ties with the U.S.

On May 13, 2025, the U.S.–Saudi Investment Forum convened in Riyadh. President Donald Trump and Saudi Crown Prince Mohammed bin Salman hosted the forum, which attracted prominent American business leaders, including Elon Musk (CEO of Tesla and SpaceX), Sam Altman (CEO of OpenAI), Larry Fink (CEO of BlackRock), and Andy Jassy (CEO of Amazon), and others. The forum focused on enhancing cooperation in technology, defense, and finance sectors. Saudi Arabia pledged $600 billion in U.S. investments, with potential increases up to $1 trillion, encompassing defense deals, artificial intelligence initiatives, and capital investments. A notable development from the forum was Nvidia's announcement of a major deal to supply semiconductors to Humain, a new Saudi Arabian AI company backed by the PIF. The agreement involves powering a 500-megawatt AI data center initiative, with several hundred thousand advanced Nvidia GPUs to be delivered over the next five years.

== Military relations ==
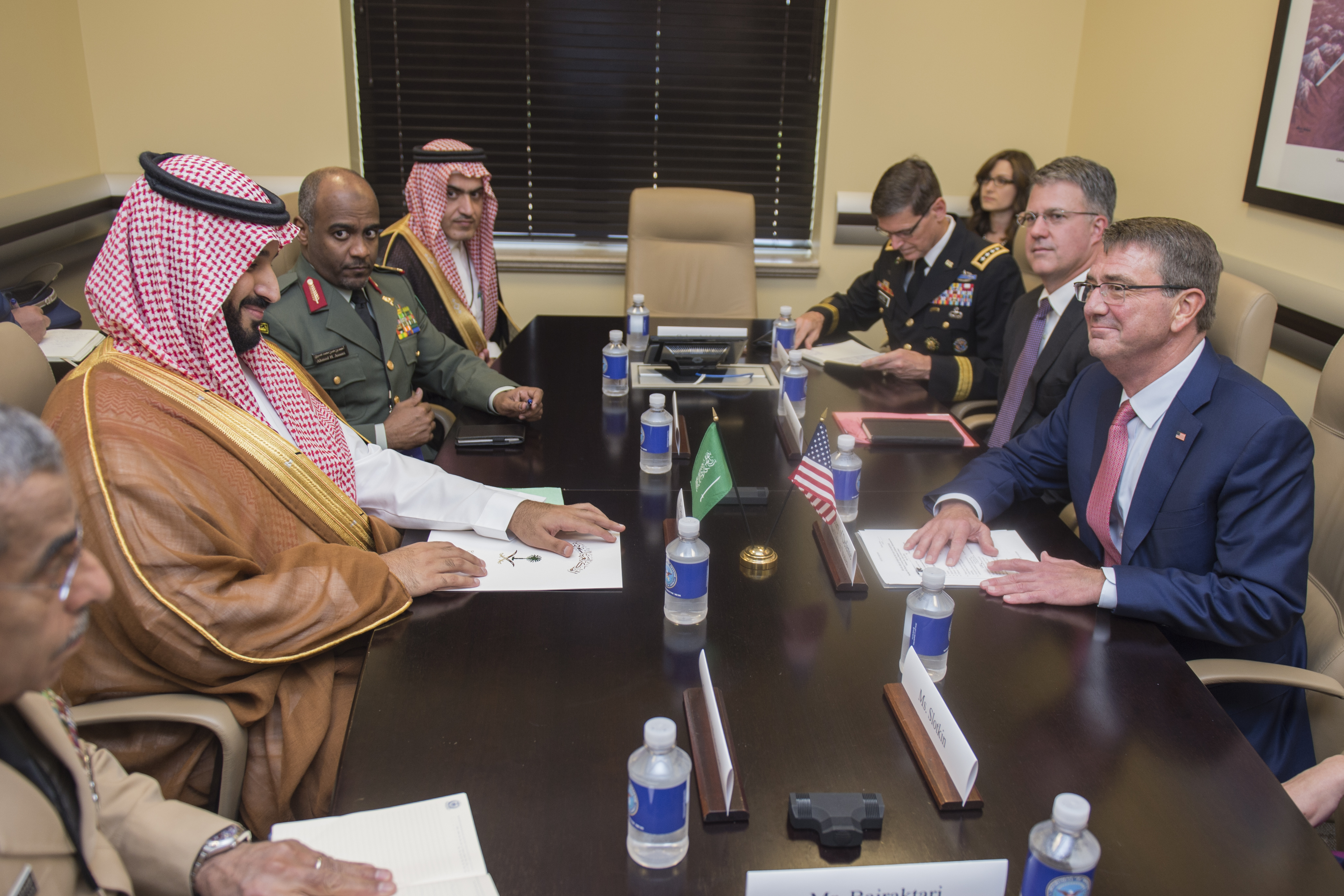
Prince Mohammed bin Salman and his advisor Ahmad Asiri (blamed for Khashoggi's death) meeting U.S. Secretary of Defense Ash Carter, July 2016

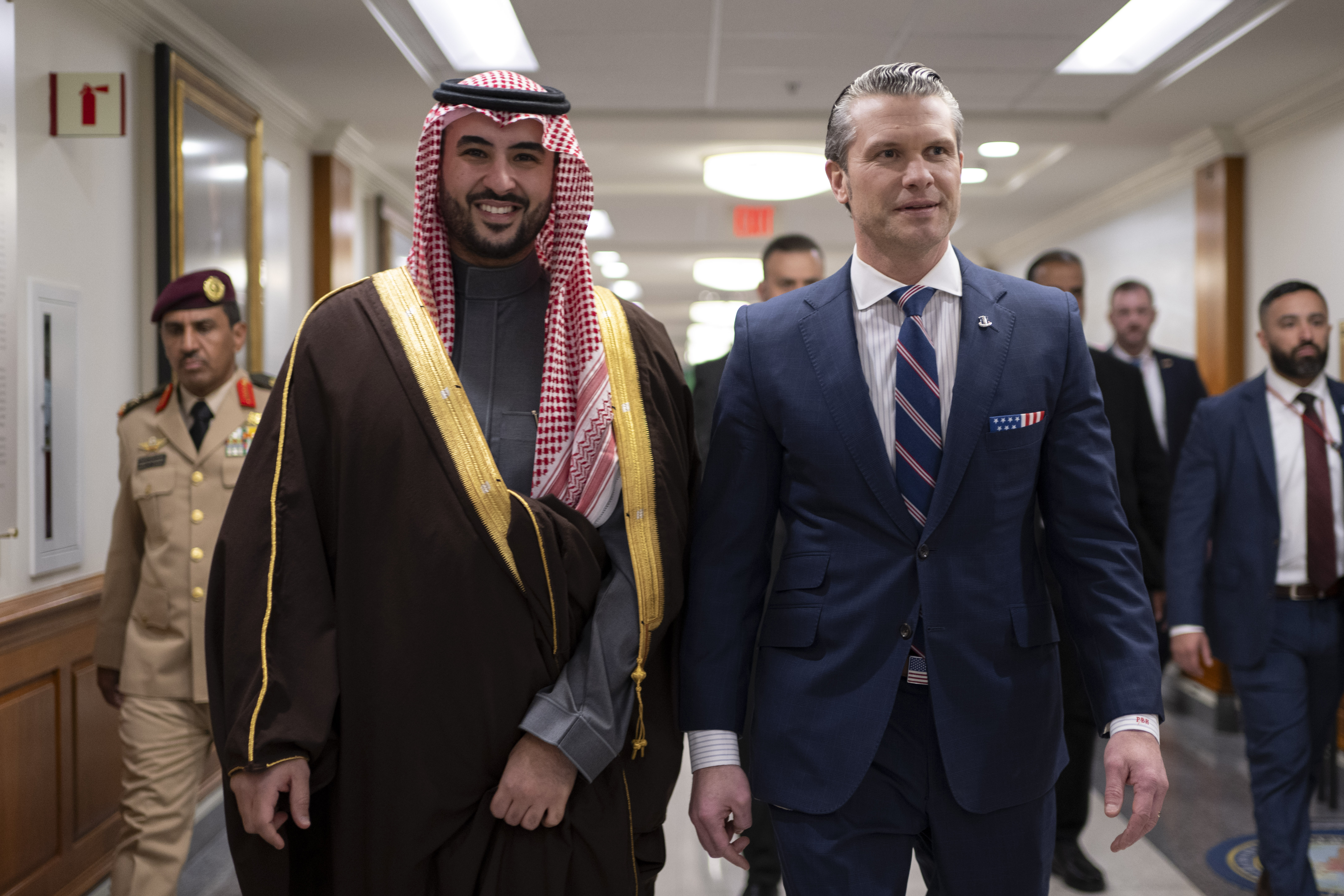
U.S. Secretary of Defense Pete Hegseth and Saudi Defense Minister Khalid bin Salman Al Saud at the Pentagon, February 24, 2025

=== Gulf War ===
In early 1990, Iraq invaded Kuwait. The U.S. coalition eventually pushed the Iraqis out and liberated Kuwait.

=== 2010 U.S. arms sale to Saudi Arabia ===
On October 20, 2010, the U.S. State Department notified Congress of its intention to make the biggest arms sale in American history—an estimated $60.5 billion purchase by the Kingdom of Saudi Arabia. The package represented a considerable improvement in the offensive capability of the Saudi armed forces.

The U.S. was keen to point out that the arms transfer would increase "interoperability" with U.S. forces. In the 1990–1991 Gulf War, American armed forces were able to deploy into a familiar battle environment because Saudi forces had been trained by the U.S. and had built military installations to U.S. specifications. The deal was meant to increase this effect.

=== 2017 U.S.–Saudi arms deal ===
On May 20, 2017, U.S. President Donald Trump authorized a nearly $110B arms deal with Saudi Arabia which was worth $300B over a ten-year period. The deal included training and close co-operation with the Saudi Arabian military. Signed documents included letters of interest and letters of intent but no actual contracts. U.S. defense stocks reached all-time highs after this deal was announced.

Saudi Arabia has signed billions of dollars of deals with U.S. companies in the arms industry and petroleum industry, including Lockheed Martin, Boeing, Raytheon, General Dynamics, Northrop Grumman, General Electric, ExxonMobil, Halliburton, Honeywell, McDermott International, Jacobs Engineering Group, National Oilwell Varco, Nabors Industries, Weatherford International, Schlumberger and Dow Chemical.

In August 2018, a laser-guided Mark 82 bomb sold by the U.S. and built by Lockheed Martin was used in the Saudi-led coalition airstrike on a school bus in Yemen, which killed 51 people, including 40 children.

On May 27, 2020, Bob Menendez, a Democrat on the Senate Foreign Relations Committee, claimed during a CNN op-ed that the Trump administration had been covertly working on plans to sell $1.8 billion worth of weapons to Saudi Arabia.

According to a draft version of the legislation reviewed by CNN, Democratic Senators Bob Menendez, Patrick Leahy and Tim Kaine were planning to introduce legislation that put strict human rights constraints on foreign arms sales to countries with poor human rights records, such Saudi Arabia and United Arab Emirates. President Trump has also received wide criticism for declaring an emergency to bypass the opposition in order to sell weapons worth billions of dollars to Saudi Arabia and the United Arab Emirates, who have been accused of conducting war crimes.

In August 2024, The Biden administration partially lifted the three-year ban on US arms sales to Saudi Arabia.

According to Reuters, Saudi Arabia has abandoned its pursuit of a defense treaty in exchange for normalizing relations with Israel. In early 2024, Saudi Arabia softened its stance on Palestinian statehood in order to achieve a comprehensive security treaty, informing Washington that Israel's overall commitment to a two-state solution might suffice for the normalization of relations with the Gulf kingdom.

Mohammed bin Salman's visit to Washington in 2025 is expected to lead to the sale of American F-35 fighter jets, which would be the first delivery of the fighters to a Middle Eastern country other than Israel. For years Israel has had a distinct advantage over its neighbors thanks to the exclusive supply of advanced weapons by the US. Also, during this meeting, the White House tried to reach an agreement to normalize Saudi relations with Israel, to which Mohammed bin Salman responded by announcing that he did not currently support normalizing relations with Israel due to the lack of a real prospect for forming a Palestinian state.

== Notable diplomatic visits ==
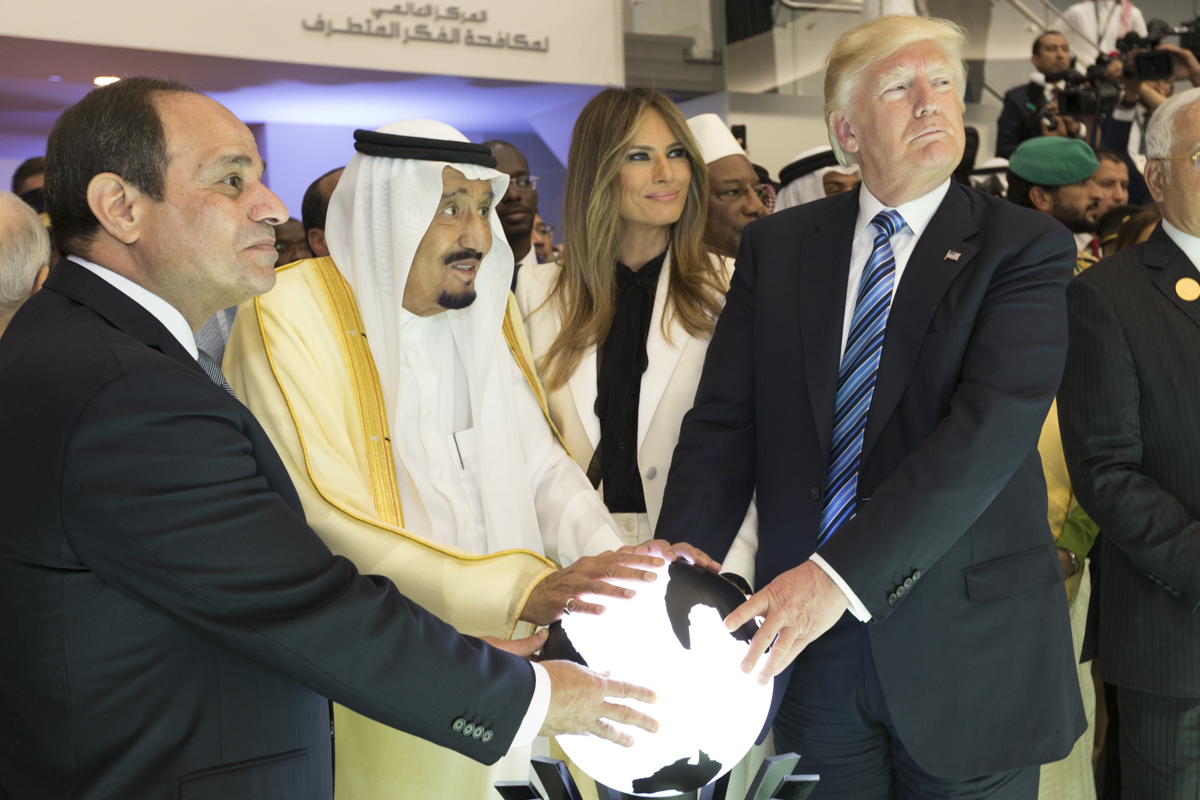
U.S. President Donald Trump, King Salman, and Egyptian President Abdel Fattah el-Sisi, May 2017

After President George W. Bush's two visits to Saudi Arabia in 2008—which was the first time a U.S. president visited a foreign country twice in less than four months—and after King Abdullah's three visits to the U.S.—2002, 2005, and 2008— relations reached their peak. The two nations have expanded their relationship beyond oil and counter-terrorism efforts. For example, King Abdullah has allocated funds for young Saudis to study in the United States. One of the most important reasons that King Abdullah has given full scholarships to young Saudis is to give them western perspective and to impart a positive impression of Saudi Arabia on the American people. On the other hand, President Bush has discussed the world economic crisis and what the U.S.–Saudi relationship can do about it. During meetings with the Saudis, the Bush administration took Saudi policies very seriously because of their prevalent economic and defensive presence in the region and their great media influence on the Islamic world. The two leaders have made many decisions that deal with the security, economic, and business aspects of the relationship.

In early 2018, the Crown Prince Mohammad bin Salman, who is proficient in English, visited the United States where he met with many top politicians, business people, and Hollywood stars, including President Donald Trump, Bill and Hillary Clinton, Henry Kissinger, Bill Gates, Jeff Bezos and George W. Bush.

From May 13 to 14, 2025, President Trump visited Saudi Arabia as the first stop of his visit to the three Gulf Arab countries, with a $600 billion commitment from Saudi Arabia to invest in America. Trump praised the development of Gulf Arab countries at the investment forum and slammed his predecessors for interfering in the internal affairs of Arab countries. In Riyadh, Trump also with a surprise announcement that the United States will lift long-standing sanctions on Syria, and met with Syrian President Ahmed al-Sharaa in the presence of Saudi Crown Prince MBS.

Saudi Crown Prince Mohammed bin Salman made his second visit to Washington, D.C. in seven years in late November 2025, holding a working meeting with U.S. President Donald Trump. During the Crown Prince's visit to the White House, the two sides reached several cooperation agreements covering key minerals, artificial intelligence, and defense. Trump indicated that the US would sell F-35 fighter jets to Saudi Arabia. Saudi Arabia stated that normalization of relations with Israel depends on finding a clear path to Palestinian statehood alongside Israel, ruling out the possibility of joining the Abraham Accords in the short term.

== Public perceptions ==
Historically, opinion polls between the two nations have shown negative sentiment toward each other despite the shifting relationship of their respective governments. Polls of Saudi Arabian citizens were conducted by Zogby International in 2002 and by the BBC between October 2005 and January 2006. The polls found that 51% of Saudis had a negative view of Americans in 2002 and that in 2005 to 2006 Saudi public opinion was sharply divided, with 38% viewing U.S. influence positively and 38% viewing U.S. influence negatively.

However, as of July 2022, 92% of young Saudis viewed the United States as an ally of their nation. In 2019, Saudi Arabian students formed the 4th largest group of international students studying in the United States and represented 3.4% of all foreigners pursuing higher education in the U.S.

A December 2013 poll found that 57% of Americans polled had an hostile view towards Saudi Arabia with only 27% favorable, while a poll in July 2021 estimated that 50% of Americans viewed the country at least as a necessary partner of the US.

Following the OPEC oil cut in October 2022, a survey of Americans estimated that 49% viewed Saudi Arabia as "either unfriendly to or an outright enemy" to the United States. An opinion poll conducted in 2022 found that a majority of Saudi citizens (59%) prioritized alignment with the Russia–China bloc rather than United States. Only 41% of Saudi citizens described relations with the US as "important"; behind China (55%), Russia (52%) and European Union (46%).

== Resident diplomatic missions ==
- Saudi Arabia has an embassy in Washington, D.C. and consulates-generals in Houston, Los Angeles and New York City.
- United States has an embassy in Riyadh and a consulate-general in Jeddah and Dhahran.
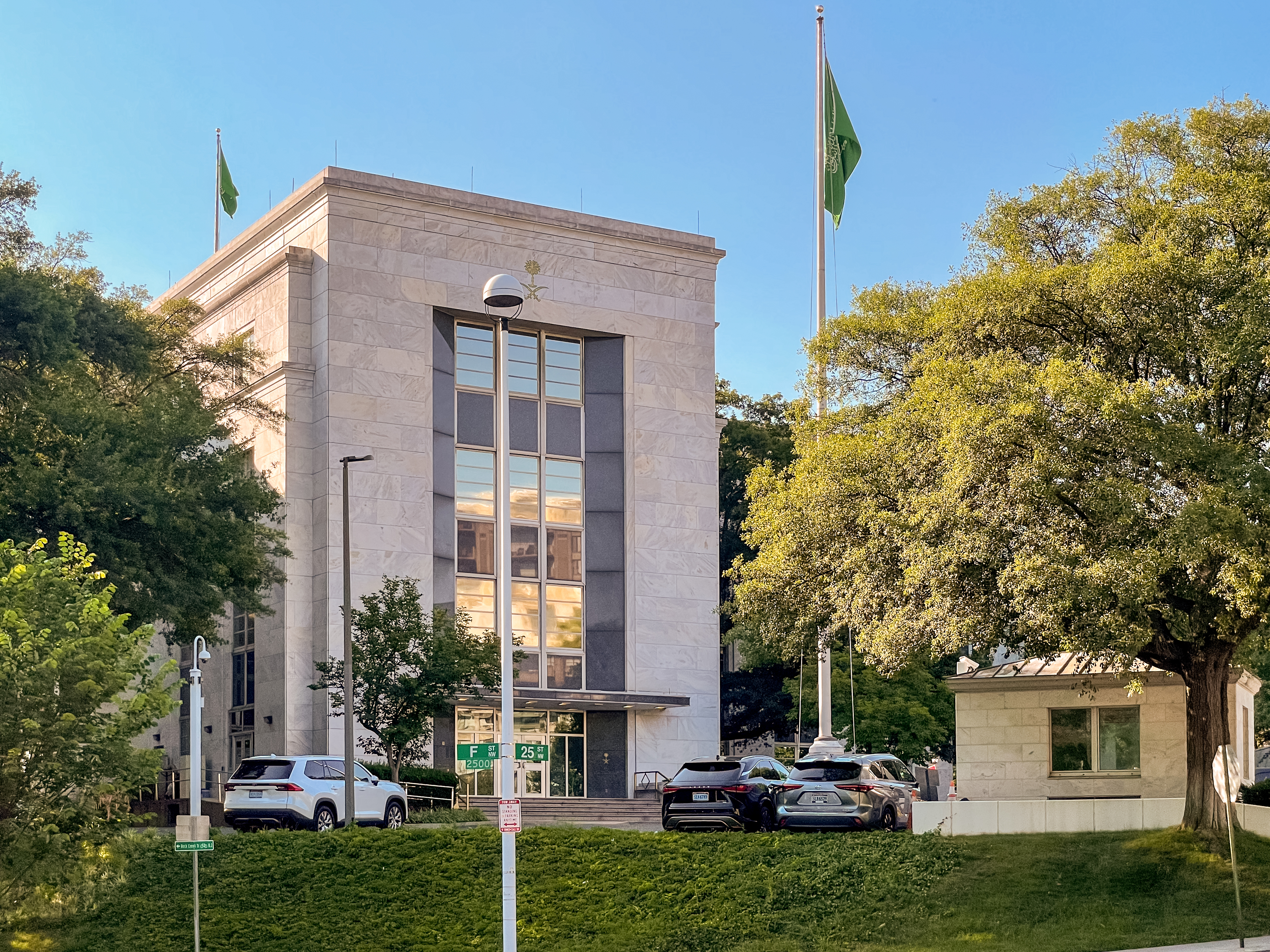
Embassy of Saudi Arabia in Washington, D.C.

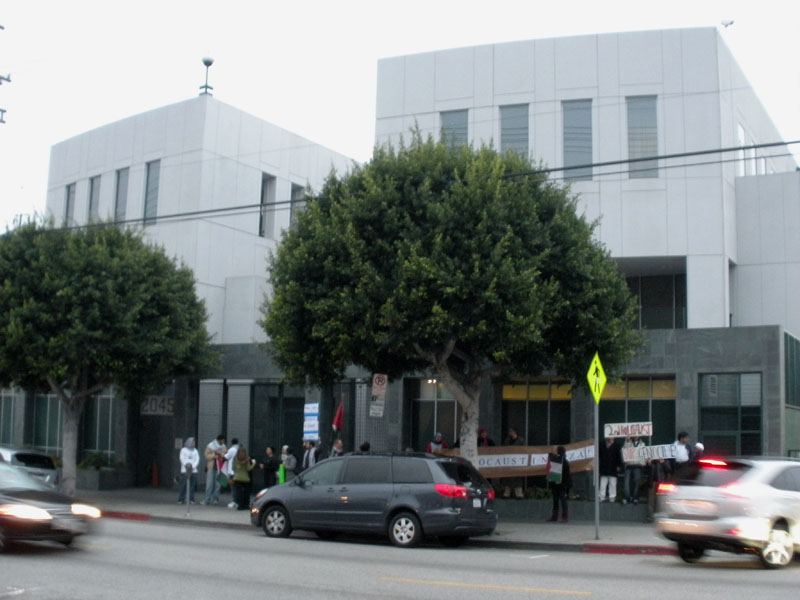
Consulate-General of Saudi Arabia in Los Angeles

== See also ==
- Foreign relations of Saudi Arabia
- Foreign relations of the United States
- Embassy of Saudi Arabia, Washington, D.C.
- Embassy of the United States, Riyadh
- List of ambassadors of Saudi Arabia to the United States
- List of ambassadors of the United States to Saudi Arabia
- Saudi Arabia lobby in the United States
