= Arab lobby in the United States =

Lobby groups for Arab world and Arab American affairs

The Arab lobby in the United States is a collection of formal and informal groups and professional lobbyists in the United States paid directly by Gulf Arab states and private donors on behalf of the Arab states.

== Origins ==
The National Association of Arab-Americans (NAAA), founded in 1972, was a political advocacy group whose goals were "to strengthen U.S. relations with Arab countries and to promote an evenhanded American policy based on justice and peace for all parties in the Middle East." In the early 1970s there was growing anti-Arab sentiment related to the Arab–Israeli conflict and the 1973 oil embargo, leading to government investigations, executive orders, and legislative provisions to combat terrorism. These especially impacted on Arab American rights and activism. The response was the creation of groups like the Association of Arab-American University Graduates, the American-Arab Anti-Discrimination Committee and the Arab American Institute.

According to Michael Lewis, Director of Policy Analysis for the American Israel Public Affairs Committee (AIPAC), for many years these groups worked together on behalf of Palestine, including through newspaper, direct mail, and advertising campaigns against U.S. loan guarantees to Israel and states' purchase of Israel bonds, condemnation of Israeli human rights violations and calls for the U.S. government to pressure Israel, as well as through pro-Palestinian protests and letter-writing campaigns. Lewis states that they also offered testimony to congress and criticized Israel's congressional and organizational supporters, sought to pass pro-Palestinian resolutions in state and national party platforms; offering pro-Palestinian testimony before Congress and attempted to sue Israel in U.S. courts. According to Lewis after the Palestine Liberation Organization had reached an agreement with Israel, there was some division among these groups, however they continue to lobby for Palestinians.

== Lobbying by Arab states ==
Some groups that are considered part of the Arab lobby are paid directly by the governments of Arab countries. The New York Times described them as an "elite band of former members of Congress, former diplomats and power brokers who have helped Middle Eastern nations navigate diplomatic waters here on delicate issues like arms deals, terrorism, oil and trade restrictions." Powerful lobbyists working on behalf of the Arab lobby include Bob Livingston, Tony Podesta, and Toby Moffett. Arab governments have paid "tens of millions of dollars" to "top" lobbying firms that work to influence the American government. This includes the Saudi Arabia lobby, Egypt lobby and the Libya lobby.

In the wake of 9/11, Saudi Arabia hired the lobbying firms Patton Boggs and Qorvis, paying $14 million a year.

Lobby fees paid by Arab governments to individual firms "commonly" reach levels of $50,000 and above. In 2009 alone, the United Arab Emirates spent $5.3 million, as the Emirates were seeking nuclear technology. In 2009 Morocco spent $3 million and Algeria spent $600,000 on Washington, D.C. lobbyists. According to Howard Marlowe, president of the American League of Lobbyists, "These kinds of regimes have a lot of money at their disposal, and that'’s a great attraction."

According to ProPublica, 4 of the top 10 governments lobbying in Washington are Arab, in terms of spending. The United Arab Emirates places first, having spent $10,914,002 in 2007 and 2008. Iraq, Morocco and Saudi Arabia also each spent over $3 million, and the non-Arab, Middle Eastern nation of Turkey also spent over $3 million.

In June 2017, Qatar began a "massive lobbying campaign" in the U.S. after President Donald Trump sided with Saudi Arabia, the United Arab Emirates, and other Arab countries in imposing a blockade against Qatar. Through August 2018, "Qatar has hired 35 US lobbying firms and paid them a total of at least $19.5 million." According to disclosure filings:

The lobbyists contacted hundreds of members of the US Congress and dozens of journalists and Trump administration officials while spending millions of dollars on advertising that promotes Qatar as a US ally.

Lobbyists hired by Qatar included:

- Trump fundraiser Brian Ballard of Ballard Partners.
- Present U.S. Attorney General nominee Pam Bondi when she was a partner at Ballard Partners in 2019.
- Former U.S. Attorney General John Ashcroft.

Mohammed bin Hamad bin Khalifa Al Thani, brother of the Emir of Qatar, is alleged to be directing the U.S. lobbying campaign.

== Arab American civil rights and advocacy groups ==
The American-Arab Anti-Discrimination Committee (ADC) was started in 1980 by United States Senator James Abourezk. It is the largest Arab American grassroots civil rights organization in the United States. Former US Congresswoman Mary Rose Oakar is the current president. ADC is at the forefront in addressing anti-Arabism - discrimination and bias against Arab Americans. It also advocates what it calls a more balanced US policy towards the Middle East.

The Arab American Institute ("AAI"), founded in 1985 by James Zogby, is a non-profit, membership organization and advocacy group based in Washington D.C. that focuses on the issues and interests of Arab American nationwide. The organization seeks to increase the visibility of Arab American involvement as voters and candidates in the American political system. It issues "Action Alerts" and encourages individual lobbying and participation in an annual national lobby day. It has promoted professors John Mearsheimer and Stephen Walt's book The Israel Lobby and U.S. Foreign Policy.

== Power of lobby ==
Academics Ali A. Mazrui and Nabeel A. Khoury have written about the virtual non-existence of an Arab lobby in America.

In a 2007 State Department Foreign Press Center Briefing, James Zogby of the Arab American Institute denied that Arab Americans lobby for Arab governments. He told an audience: "There are many Arab lobbies. Each Arab government hires lobbyists to do their work for them. And we Arab Americans are not an Arab lobby. I think that the thing in the Jewish community that's interesting is that the Jewish community is supportive of Israel and the Israeli Government works very closely with elements in the American Jewish community around a convergence of ideas and issues and interests, and that has created the sense of an Israel lobby. [...] I'm an American and we're an American lobby, if anything at all. We want American policy to be right. We want American policy to live up to its values. We want America to promote peace and justice and human rights in the region. We're not advocates for any particular country. " Zogby also said "The reality about Arab Americans is that we are emerging as a political group."

Researchers Sherri Replogle and Khalil Marrar write: "While pro-Arab lobbying pales in comparison to those of the pro-Israel lobby, the end of the Cold-War, the current war on terrorism, and clear American and international support for the two-state solution as manifested by public opinion polls, policymakers' statements, and United Nations Security Council Resolutions 1397 and 1515, provide the pro-Arab lobby with a crucial opportunity to realize its vision of Palestinian statehood."

In 2010 lobbyists paid by the government of Egypt succeeded in preventing the Senate from passing a bill calling on Egypt to curtail human rights abuses.

== Recent UAE lobbying against Arab League Gaza plans ==
The UAE has reportedly intensified lobbying efforts to undermine Egypt's Arab League-backed Gaza reconstruction plan, with Emirati officials pressuring the Trump administration to condition military aid to Egypt on Cairo's withdrawal of its proposal. Ambassador Yousef al-Otaiba allegedly targeted lawmakers and Trump allies to promote the forced displacement of Gazans, countering the Arab consensus. This aligns with broader Emirati lobbying patterns, including a $64 million expenditure on U.S. influence campaigns (2020-2021) and efforts to secure advanced arms sales.

== See also ==
- Anti-Israel lobby in the United States
- Project Endgame
- Egypt lobby in the United States
- Libya lobby in the United States
- Palestine lobby in the United States
- Saudi Arabia lobby in the United States
- Lobbying in the United States
- Diaspora politics in the United States
- Ethnic interest groups in the United States
- Organization of Arab Petroleum Exporting Countries
- United States oil politics
- United States security assistance to the Palestinian Authority

== Sources ==
- Daniel Yergin, The Prize: The Epic Quest for Oil, Money, and Power (1990)
