= Fossil fuels lobby =

Lobbying supporting the fossil fuels industry

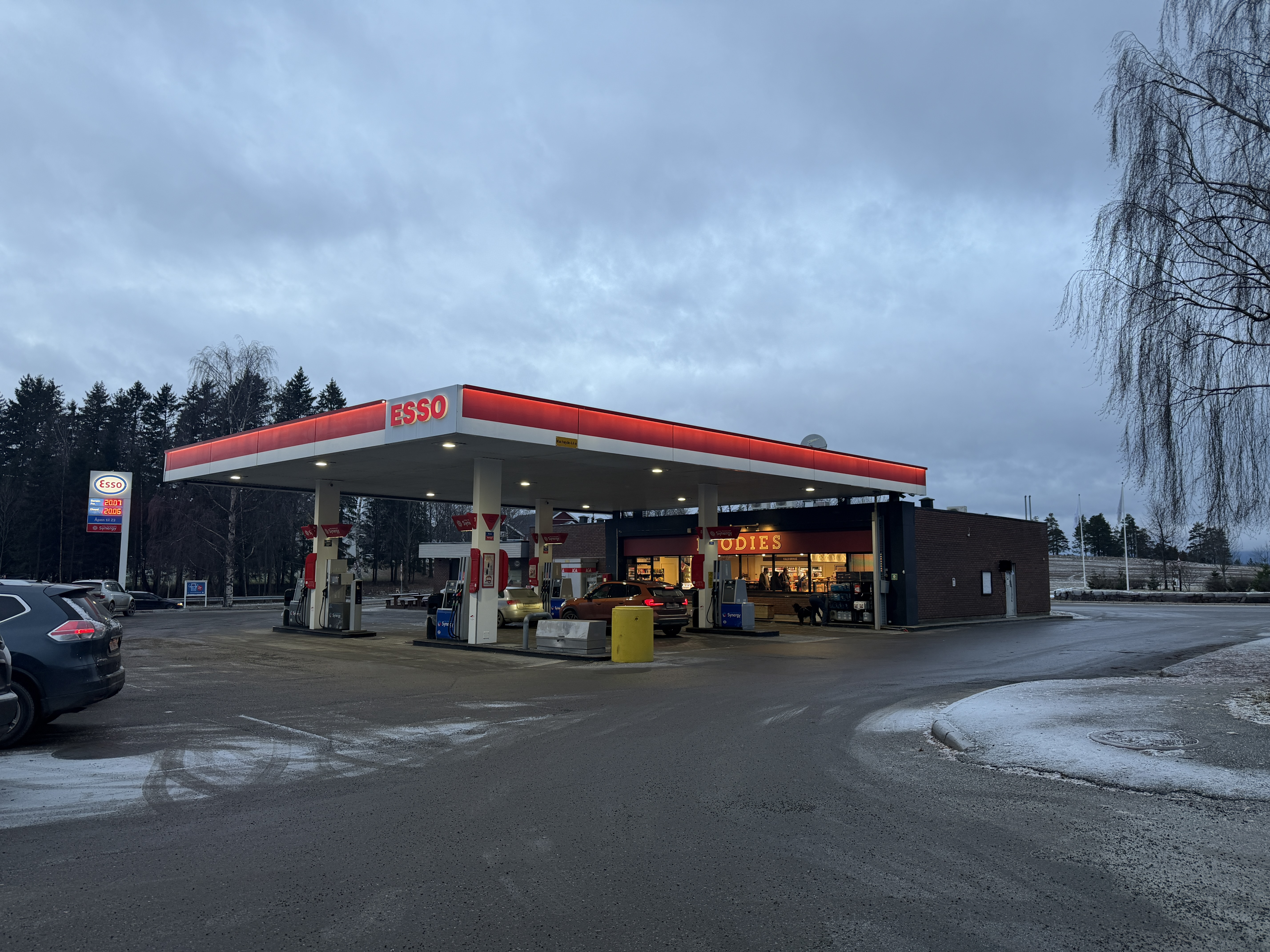
Petrol station in Sundvollen, Norway

The fossil fuels lobby includes paid representatives of corporations involved in the fossil fuel industry (oil, gas, coal), as well as related industries like chemicals, plastics, aviation and other transportation. Because of their wealth and the importance of energy, transport and chemical industries to local, national and international economies, these lobbies have the capacity and money to attempt to have outsized influence on governmental policy. In particular, the lobbies promote climate change denial and obstruct policy related to environmental protection, environmental health and climate action.

For example, after climate change became a public topic, the fossil fuel lobby began a massive public relations campaign to undermine public understanding of climate change and block meaningful policy action. Since then, the fossil fuel industry has actively denied and cast doubt on climate science, confused the public and politicians, and prevented climate and clean energy policies through disinformation, lobbying, and propaganda and continues to do so, for example by falsely claiming there is no climate consensus among scientists.

Lobbies are active in most fossil-fuel intensive economies with democratic governance, with reporting on the lobbies most prominent in Canada, Australia, the United States and Europe; however, the lobbies are present in many parts of the world. Big Oil companies such as ExxonMobil, Shell, BP, TotalEnergies, Chevron Corporation, and ConocoPhillips are among the largest corporations associated with the fossil fuels lobby. The American Petroleum Institute is a powerful industry lobbyist for Big Oil with significant influence in Washington, D.C. In Australia, Australian Energy Producers, formerly known as the Australian Petroleum Production and Exploration Association (APPEA), has significant influence in Canberra and helps to maintain favorable policy settings for Oil and Gas.

The presence of major fossil fuel companies and national oil companies at global forums for decision making, like the Intergovernmental Panel on Climate Change, Paris Climate Agreement negotiations, and United Nations Climate Change conferences has been criticised. The lobby is known for exploiting international crises, such as the COVID-19 pandemic, or the 2022 Russian invasion of Ukraine, to try to roll back existing regulations or justify new fossil fuel development. Lobbyists try to retain fossil fuel subsidies.

== Influence ==
Those corporations that continue to invest in new fossil fuel exploration, new fossil fuel exploitation, are really in flagrant breach of their fiduciary duty because the science is abundantly clear that this is something we can no longer do.

— Christiana Figueres, executive secretary of the United Nations Framework Convention on Climate Change

Globally, net income of the oil and gas industry reached a record US$4 trillion in 2022.

After the COVID-19 pandemic, energy company profits increased with higher fuel prices resulting from the Russian invasion of Ukraine, falling debt levels, tax write-downs of projects shut down in Russia, and backing off from earlier plans to reduce greenhouse gas emissions.

The energy lobby has a history of conflict with international interests and democratic global governance. According to the International Sustainable Energy Organization for Renewable Energy and Energy Efficiency the second World Climate Conference "was sabotaged by the USA and oil lobbies" whereupon UNISEO proceeded to set up a Global Energy Charter "which protects life, health, climate and the biosphere from emissions." According to the organization, these same "reactionary energy lobby groups tried to boycott this Charter with the help from oil- and coal-producing nations and succeeded to keep the energy transition out of the Rio Conference on Environment & Development (Earth Summit) in 1992, to continue this game in all Climate Conferences in Berlin, Kyoto, The Hague and Marrakesh, where the USA boycotted the Kyoto Protocol and still ignores the Charter." It is estimated that during the 2010s the five biggest oil and gas companies, and their industry groups, spent at least €251 million lobbying the European Union over climate policies. Lobbying was also influential in Canada and Australia during the 2010s.

During the 14th session of the United Nations Commission on Sustainable Development, according to the International Institute for Sustainable Development Bulletin, "One minister is said to have challenged the North's renewable energy lobby with the words: why not 'light up' the dark zones of the world by 'extinguishing some of the candles' in yours?"

According to the UNFCCC, 636 fossil fuel lobbyists attended COP27.

Publicly, fossil-fuel corporations say that they support the Paris Agreement aiming to limit global warming below 2 °C in 2100. Internal reports of BP and Shell show that they have made contingency business models plans for warming of more than 3 °C of global warming in 2050.

=== Environmental impact of companies ===
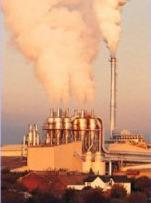
Refineries owned by energy companies produce large amounts of air pollution.

As of 2015, many of the most influential members of the energy lobby have been among the top polluters in the United States, with Conoco, Exxon, and General Electric ranking in the top six. According to the Environmental Integrity Project, a nonpartisan, nonprofit organization established in March 2002 by former attorneys at the Environmental Protection Agency, "companies like ExxonMobil and Sunoco keep reporting record profits while increasing emissions or more cancer causing chemicals from their refineries." The energy lobby has been criticized by environmentalists for using its influence to try to block or dilute legislation regarding global climate change.

=== Climate denialism ===
Many issues that are settled in the scientific community, such as human responsibility for climate change, remain the subject of politically or economically motivated attempts to downplay, dismiss or deny them—an ideological phenomenon academics and scientists call climate change denial. Climate scientists, especially in the United States, have reported government and oil-industry pressure to censor or suppress their work and hide scientific data, with directives not to discuss the subject publicly. The fossil fuels lobby has been identified as overtly or covertly supporting efforts to undermine or discredit the scientific consensus on climate change.

Industrial, political and ideological interests organize activity to undermine public trust in climate science.

Climate change denial has been associated with the fossil fuels lobby, the Koch brothers, industry advocates, ultraconservative think tanks, and ultraconservative alternative media, often in the U.S. More than 90% of papers that are skeptical of climate change originate from right-wing think tanks. Climate change denial is undermining efforts to act on or adapt to climate change, and exerts a powerful influence on the politics of climate change.

In the 1970s, oil companies published research that broadly concurred with the scientific community's view on climate change. Since then, for several decades, oil companies have been organizing a widespread and systematic climate change denial campaign to seed public disinformation, a strategy that has been compared to the tobacco industry's organized denial of the hazards of tobacco smoking. Some of the campaigns are even carried out by the same people who previously spread the tobacco industry's denialist propaganda.

=== Political Polarisation ===
There is a wealth of evidence that details the role of the fossil fuel lobby in the catalysation of culture war and further political polarisation, by financially investing in social conservatism and its socially regressive rhetoric:

- Fracking billionaires Dan and Farris Wilks have donated upwards of $12 million in funding to right-wing media outlets such as the Daily Wire and PragerU, who heavily push a socially conservative narrative. The pair have donated millions more to a wide variety of ring-wing groups and Republican candidates, including $15 million to Ted Cruz's abortive run for president in 2016, and later made sizeable donations to Donald Trump’s campaign for presidency in 2020.
- An analysis of 45 major U.S. anti-trans organisations found that 80% received donations from fossil fuel companies or billionaires, one of which being the ADF, a key group in authoring a wide array of anti-trans legislation that has been successfully implemented on a federal and state-wide basis.

These examples further support separate studies which detail how the fossil fuel lobby intentionally diverts attention away from tangible and ongoing environmental issues through the creation of moral panic, suppressing a bi-partisan coalition for climate justice and creating a strong political base that will oppose climate regulations and maintain the lobby’s interests. Thus, the oil industry directly benefits from engaging in the maintenance of a traditional social order, trading legal protections and support for marginalised groups and other social issues in exchange for the preservation or advancement of the fossil fuel industry.

== Australia ==
In 2023 the Australian Energy Council lobbied against adding an environmental component to the National Electricity Objective.

== China ==
The coal lobby was said to be powerful in China in 2025. While the country is taking steps towards implementing green energy, coal as an energy source and industry still holds a stronghold within the nation due to historical and symbolic ties with the rise of the Chinese Communist Party (CCP). One notable group, the China Petroleum & Chemical Corporation, also known as Sinopec Group, advocated the Chinese Communist Party to continue the extraction of unconventional oil and gas through various projects and policy proposals. In 2024, the state-operated coal lobby advocated for an ease of restrictions on oil exports, carbon capturing technologies, and methane emission abatement.

== United States ==
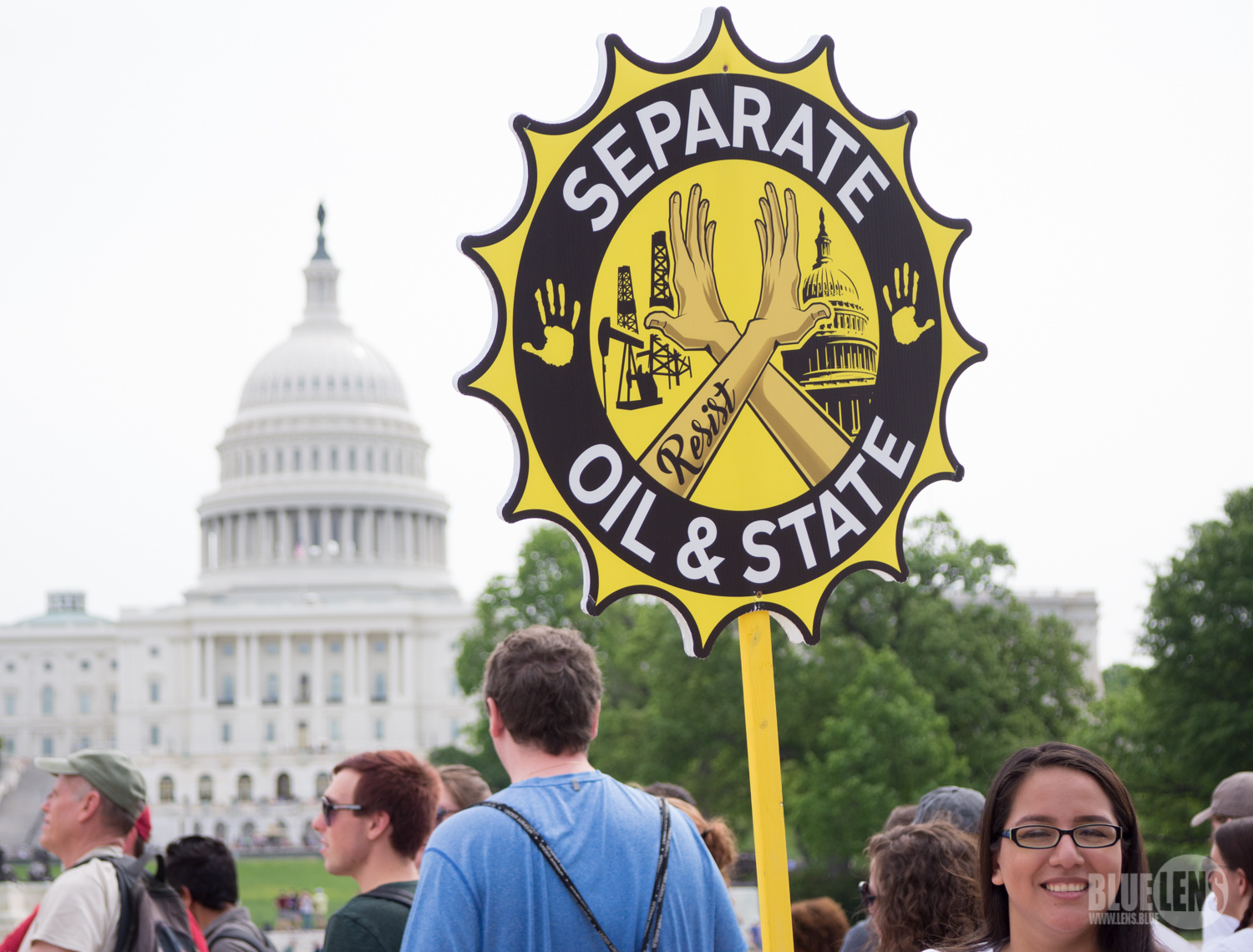
Placard "Separate oil and state", at the People's Climate March (2017)

In the 2000 elections, over $34 million was contributed, with 78% of that money going to Republicans. In 2004, oil and gas companies contributed over $25 million to political campaigns, donating 80% of that money to Republicans. In the 2006 election cycle, oil and gas companies contributed over $19 million to political campaigns. 82% of that money went to Republican candidates, while the remaining 18% went to Democrats. Electric utilities also heavily favor Republicans; their contributions have recently ranged between $15 and 20 million. From 2003 to 2006, the energy lobby also contributed $58.3 million to state-level campaigns. By comparison, alternative energy interests contributed around half a million dollars in the same time period.

During the United States elections in 2012 which includes the presidential election there was much spending by the lobbies.

Since 2008, the fossil fuel industry has spent over $100 million every year to influence the US government.

=== Governmental influence in the United States ===
The largest oil and gas companies that are sometime collectively referred to as Big Oil, and their industry lobbyist arm, the American Petroleum Institute (API), have spent large amounts of money every year on lobbying and political campaigns, and employ hundreds of lobbyists, to obstruct and delay government action to address climate change.

The fossil fuel lobby has considerable clout in Washington, D.C., and in other political centers, and have scored key political appointments in the administrations of U.S. President George W. Bush and President Donald Trump. President George W. Bush, like his father President George H. W. Bush, was a former oil industry senior executive, and President Trump has had various cabinet officials throughout both of his administrations, his first Secretary of State, Rex Tillerson, was the CEO of one of largest of the Big Oil companies, ExxonMobil, and his most recent Energy Secretary, Chris Wright, was the CEO of Liberty Energy, advocates against climate change efforts and is vocal for fracking development. Fossil fuel industry interests spend many times as much on advancing their agenda in the halls of power than do ordinary citizens and environmental activists, with the former spending $2 billion in the years 2000–2016 on climate change lobbying in the United States. Big Oil companies often adopt "sustainability principles" that are at odds with the policy agenda their lobbyists advocate, which often entails sowing doubt about the reality and impacts of climate change and forestalling government efforts to address them. API launched a public relations disinformation campaign with the aim of creating doubt in the public mind so that "climate change becomes a non-issue."

The fossil fuel industry spends large amounts of money on American political campaigns, with about 2/3 of its political contributions over the past several decades fueling Republican politicians, and outspending many fold political contributions for renewable energy. Fossil fuel industry political contributions reward politicians who vote against environmental protections. According to a study published by the Proceedings of the National Academy of Sciences of the United States of America, as voting by a member of Congress turned more anti-environment, as measured by his/her voting record as scored by the League of Conservation Voters (LCV), the fossil fuel industry contributions that this member of Congress received increased. On average, a 10% decrease in the LCV score was correlated with an increase of $1,700 in campaign contributions from the industry for the campaign following the congressional term.

==== Bush administration links to Big Oil ====
Various scandals involving prominent politicians have drawn attention to the close links between the energy lobby and the U.S. government, particularly the influence wielded by the energy lobby in the Bush administration. Lobbying continued after the Bush administration. In June 2005, documents emerged that revealed that the Bush administration had consulted Exxon regarding its stance on the Kyoto Protocol. According to The Guardian, "In briefing papers given before meetings to the U.S. Under Secretary of State for Democracy and Global Affairs, Paula Dobriansky, between 2001 and 2004, the administration is found thanking Exxon executives for the company's 'active involvement' in helping to determine climate change policy, and also seeking its advice on what climate change policies the company might find acceptable." In November 2005, documents revealed that Vice President Dick Cheney's Energy Task Force met with executives from large oil companies, although chief executives of those companies denied involvement before the Senate Energy and Commerce committees. Environmentalists were not allowed access to the Energy Task Force's activities, which was responsible for developing a national energy policy. Oil companies also participated with Dick Cheney's task force in a discussion of Iraqi oilfields, refineries and other energy infrastructure, and two charts detailing Iraqi oil and gas projects, and "Foreign Suitors for Iraqi Oilfield Contracts." The documents are dated two years before the 2003 invasion of Iraq, and six months before the 11 September attacks (9/11).

==== House of Representatives ====
With the U.S. House of Representatives returning to Republican control in 2023, many fossil fuel industry lobbyists have been given key staff jobs, including positions as chiefs of staff to House Natural Resources Chairman Bruce Westerman, House Majority Leader Steve Scalise, Pete Stauber, and Tom Tiffany.

== Canada ==
From 2011 to 2018, fossil fuel industry lobbyists recorded 11,452 lobbying contacts with government officials. This is significantly higher than other industries and averages out to six lobbying contacts per day. Fossil fuel lobbyists contacted government officials five times more than non-government environmental organizations.

Canada's Lobbyist Act does not require companies to disclose how much money they spend on lobbying the Canadian government, and does not require companies to register lobbyists that interact with government officials who hold a title less than assistant deputy minister.

The Canadian Association of Petroleum Producers (CAPP) is an advocacy group for energy companies in Canada. CAPP states that their vision is to "enhance Canada's prosperity by enabling responsible growth of Canada's upstream oil and natural gas industry." A large portion of CAPP's membership is made up of oil refineries which harvest oil from the oil sands of Alberta. CAPP estimates that the oil sands industry will pay about $8 billion in taxes over the next six years. The President of CAPP is Tim McMillan, who previously served as the Minister of Trade and Minister of Rural and Remote Health for the province of Saskatchewan.

In July 2020, French energy company TotalEnergies withdrew its membership from the Canadian association of petroleum producers, which is a lobbying group that represents the oil and natural gas producers in Canada. They withdrew after writing off US$7 billion of oil sands assets in Alberta because of the high production costs. Total SA stated they left CAPP because of a "misalignment between the organization's public positions and those expressed in Total's climate ambition statement announced in May", according to The Canadian Press.

=== Government influence in Canada ===
In 2012 alone, 27 different energy companies and eight industry associations engaged in lobbying the Canadian parliament in Ottawa. Enbridge and TransCanada, which are the two largest pipeline companies in Canada, met with cabinet ministers 52 times between 2011 and 2012. Since 2008, the Canadian Energy Pipelines Association (CEPA) "met with public office holders 367 percent more times than the two major Canadian automotive industry associations."

Included in the list of lobbyists for Big Oil in Canada are former government employees. Over the last 10 years this list has included Brenda Kenny, who served 10 years with the National Energy Board, Paul Cheliak, a former economist for Natural Resources Canada, and Bruce Carson, a convicted thief who served as the top policy analyst under prime minister Stephen Harper.

From 2000 to 2018, oil production in Canada increased by 80%, but the royalties paid by the sector decreased by 63%. In addition, the taxes paid by the oil companies was cut in half.

Kevin Taft, the former leader of the Opposition (2004–2008) in the province of Alberta, has argued that the oil industry has acquired enough power to constitute a "deep state", which he blames for Canada's failure to implement policies consistent with limiting greenhouse gas emissions and for a growing democratic deficit.

=== Canadian oil industry's influence abroad ===
Canada's oil lobbyists spend money outside of Canada to further international agreements. In 2015, lobbyists for TransCanada, the owner of the Keystone XL pipeline project, spent $500,000 in a single legislative session lobbying Nebraska state senators. While U.S. law forbids foreign companies and individuals from making political contributions, TransCanada officially made the contributions through its U.S. subsidiary.

== Europe ==
=== Industry influence in European Union policy ===
The five biggest oil and gas companies spent at least 251 million euros lobbying the European Union over climate policies since 2010. These lobbyists represent a total of 200 organizations. Some of these companies include BP, Shell, Chevron, ExxonMobil and Total. There have been 327 high-level meetings between the EU and Big Oil and Gas since 2014, this averages to more than one meeting a week. In the EU, there are 200 lobbyists working on behalf of the top five oil and gas companies. The European Green Deal was the #1 most lobbied topic at the European Union in the first 100 days of the European Green Deal being implemented on 11 December 2019, accounting for one-fifth of all high-level lobby meetings.

=== Oil industry lobbying in the United Kingdom ===
Shell gas company began lobbying the United Kingdom government as early as 2011 to undermine European renewable energy targets, according to The Guardian. They had several meetings with European Commission president Jose Manuel Barroso, Shell successfully lobbied Barroso and his predecessor, Jean-Claude Juncker, to move away from the plan which originally had binding, carbon-cutting goals for each individual member state. Shell argued instead for gas expansion in Europe, because they believed it would save 500 billion euros in a transition to a low carbon energy system.

=== Turkey ===
In October 2021 a coal-fired power station was said by opposition MP Ali Öztunç to be still operating without filters due to company lobbying.

=== South Africa ===
There is a strong coal lobby, which is also supported by the mining industry. As of 2023, South Africa relied on coal for 70% of its power and 85% of its electricity, according to the International Energy Agency. The largest electricity company is Eskom, a state-owned company that supplies 90% of the electricity in South Africa (with 80% of the electricity provided by coal). The coal industry employs less than 1% of the population. The country suffers from electricity blackouts and dwindling coal deposits. However, the coal lobby has fought to oppose the Just Energy Transition Partnership (JETP), which is an agreement between various countries, including South Africa, to phase out coal by 2035. Coal lobbyists have partnered with politicians to dilute or delay bills, such as the Carbon Tax Act and the Climate Change Bill.

== See also ==
- American Petroleum Institute
- Australian Coal Association
- List of climate change controversies
- Fossil fuel subsidies
- ExxonMobil climate change denial
- Fossil fuel divestment
- Greenhouse Mafia
- Lobbying in the United Kingdom
- Lobbying in the United States
- Petroleum politics
- Politics of climate change
- The Big Myth
- The Petroleum Papers
- Tobacco industry playbook
