= Democracy sausage (Taiwan) =

Booths at street protests in Taiwan

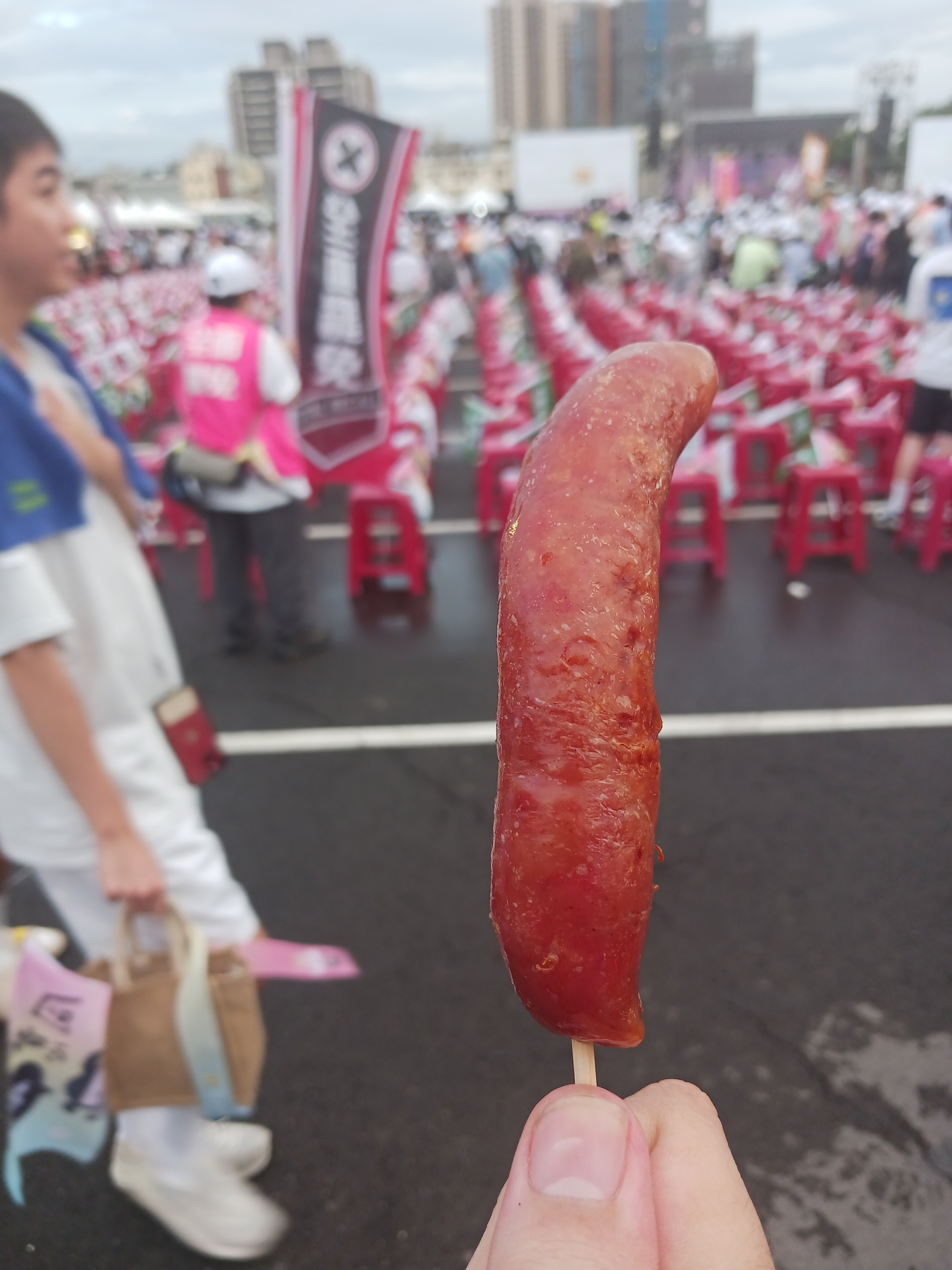
A sausage at a protest supporting 2025 Taiwanese mass electoral recall campaigns in Taichung, Taiwan

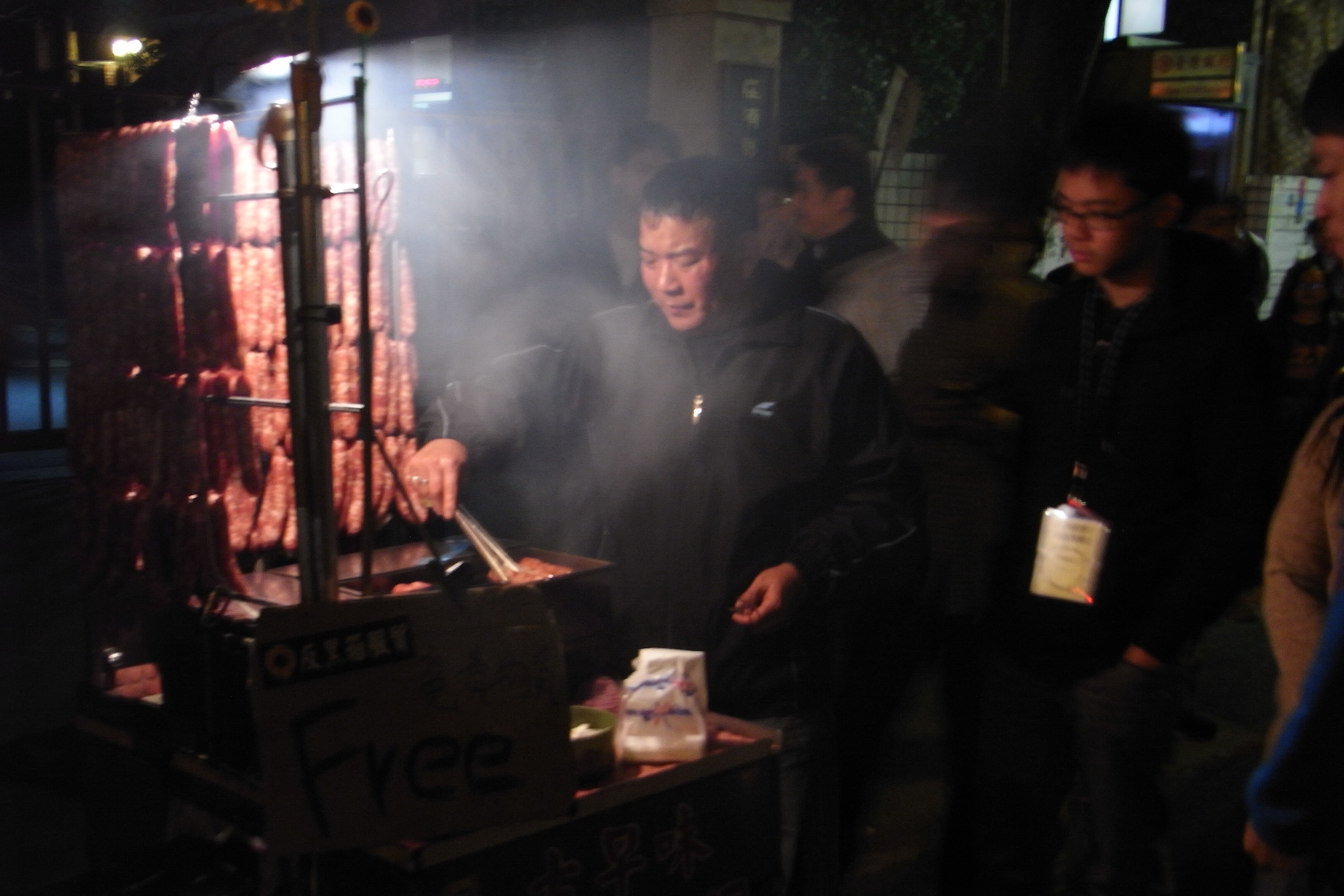
A sausage booth in the Sunflower Movement

Democracy sausages (Chinese: 民主香腸, Min Nan Chinese: bîn-chú ian-chhiâng or bîn-tsú ian-tshiâng) are sausage booths operated at street protests in Taiwan. These booths mostly sell sausages, rice sausage, their combination known as small sausage in large sausage, and drinks. They may also sell other foods or goods, such as drinks or merchandise related to politicians. According to etnet, a vendor can prepare 2,000 sausages, or generate 60,000 new Taiwan dollar worth of sales in a protest.

The origins of such booths can be traced back to the Tangwai movement, when it was associated with the Democratic Progressive Party. Local vendors saw demand and business opportunities during protests, and therefore operated at many protests in Taiwan at the time. Some protesters of the wild Lily student movement described democracy sausages as "the taste of free speech and association".

In 2019, democracy sausages was mentioned by Lin Chia-lung, the Minister of Foreign Affairs in Taiwan at the time, while explaining Taiwanese democracy to Bruno Kaufmann, the co-founder of Democracy International. In 2025, Joseph Wu, the secretary-general of the National Security Council at the time, also mentioned democracy sausages when meeting with Gabrielius Landsbergis, the former minister for Foreign Affairs in Lithuania.

== External sites ==
- 非官方聚合的民主香腸，國家文化記憶庫 2.0
