= LGCA =

LGCA may refer to:

- Lesbian and Gay Community Appeal Foundation
- Lattice gas cellular automaton
- U.S.-Israel Loan Guarantee Commitment Agreement
