= Syring =

Syring is a surname. Notable people with the surname include:

- Max Syring (1908–1983), German long-distance runner
- Patrick Syring (born 1957), American diplomat
