= Democracy International =

Democracy International means:

- Democracy International eV, a German organization with an international focus on the promotion of direct democracy
- Democracy International, Inc, a U.S. organization that advises and assists on behalf of governments, ministries and NGOs in democracy and governance projects
