= Christof-Sebastian Klitz =

Christof-Sebastian Klitz (born September 8, 1959, in Hamburg) is the Head of the Volkswagen Representative Office in Brussels and Board Member of the European Movement International.

Christof-Sebastian Klitz studied law at the University of Hamburg. He graduated with the Second State Examination in German Law.

Early in his professional career, he worked as a research assistant at the University of Hamburg before working for the Federation of German Industries in 1991. There he became deputy head of the delegates' office of the German Economy in Washington, D.C. After that, he worked for Burson-Marsteller in Bonn and Berlin as well as for the Deutsche Telekom in Bonn.

Since 2008 he works as a lobbyist in Berlin and Brussels for Volkswagen.

He works voluntarily as deputy head of the local chapter of the Wirtschaftsrat der CDU in Brussels.

In 2011 he was elected vice president of the European Movement International.
