= Arab American Institute =

Non-profit organization based in Washington, D.C.

- Formation: 1986
- Founder: James Zogby
- Type: Non-profit advocacy organization
- Tax ID no.: 52-1395040
- Headquarters: Washington, D.C.
- President: James Zogby
- Executive Director: Maya Berry
- Website: www.aaiusa.org

The Arab American Institute (AAI) is a non-profit organization that advocates for the interests of Arab-Americans. Founded in 1985 by James Zogby, the brother of pollster John Zogby, the organization is based in Washington, D.C.

The organization seeks to increase the visibility of Arab-American involvement and candidates in the American political system. It issues "Action Alerts" to its members when issues of particular concern arise. According to its website the organization develops policy initiatives much in the manner of a think tank and encourages its members to contact Members of Congress.

The institute describes its focus through three main areas of work: strengthening democracy, protecting civil rights and civil liberties, and standing for international peace and human rights.

== Activities ==
=== Arab-American Census ===
The AAI has been designated by the United States Census Bureau as the only Census Information Center for compiling data on Arab-Americans. Limitations of the sampling methodology, combined with non-response by some, under-response (only two ethnic backgrounds are tabulated and reported), and reporting ancestry as race, result in higher underreporting among Arab Americans. While the 2020 Census counted about 2.8 million people who self-identify with an Arabic-speaking origin, AAI estimates place the population at more than 3.7 million. While Arab Americans live in all 50 states—the top 12 by population are (in descending order):

- California: 533,307
- Michigan: 393,733
- New York: 300,653
- Texas: 245,420
- Florida: 206,181
- Illinois: 181,139
- New Jersey: 179,449
- Ohio: 168,623
- Minnesota: 161,941
- Virginia: 134,322
- Massachusetts: 128,628
- Pennsylvania: 126,553

Two-thirds reside in 10 states; one-third of the total live in California, New York, and Michigan. About 95% live in metropolitan areas; Los Angeles, Detroit, New York City, Chicago and Washington, D.C., are the top 5 US metro-areas of Arab-American concentration. Lebanese-Americans constitute a greater part of the total number of Arab-Americans residing in most states; however, in New Jersey, Egyptian-Americans are the largest Arab group. The Arab American Institute states that Arab Americans are undercounted in the 2020 Census as there is no existing category on Census forms to collect data on Arab Americans leaving Census numbers on Arab Americans coming only from voluntary write-in responses.

=== Anti-Arab Racism ===
In July 2006, during the 2006 Lebanon War, Patrick Syring left three voice mails and sent four emails to the headquarters office of the Arab American Institute. A Federal Grand Jury in the District of Columbia returned an indictment on August 15, 2007, charging Syring with violation of Title 18 of the United States Code, Section 875(c), threatening messages in interstate commerce to injure an individual, and violation of Title 18 United States Code Section 245(b)(2)(C), by threat of force or use of force, to interfere with the civil rights of the founder and employees of the Arab American Institute. Syring pleaded guilty to the charges June 12, 2008, was sentenced to prison July 11, 2008, and was released in January 2009.

In 2001, the Coalition of American Assyrians and Maronites rebuked the Arab American Institute in a letter for categorizing Maronite Christians and Assyrians as Arabs.

== See also ==
- Arab lobby in the United States
- American-Arab Anti-Discrimination Committee
- Council on American-Islamic Relations
- Arab Barometer
