= Saudi Arabia lobby in the United States =

The Saudi Arabia lobby in the United States is a collection of lawyers, public relation firms and professional lobbyists paid directly by the government of Saudi Arabia to lobby the public and government of the United States on behalf of the interests of the government of Saudi Arabia.

In January 2023, DAWN reported that the accounts of 16 Saudi citizens were used to exclude several pro-Saudi influencing editors from Wikipedia, affecting a diverse range of articles. However, Wikipedia's operator has denied such allegations.

== Power of the lobby ==
An article by journalist John R. MacArthur in Harper's Magazine details "The Vast Power of the Saudi Lobby". According to MacArthur,

The long history of American-Saudi relations centers around the kingdom's vast reserves of easily extractable oil, of course. Ever since President Franklin D. Roosevelt met aboard ship in 1945 with King Ibn Saud, the special relationship with the desert kingdom has only grown stronger. The House of Saud is usually happy to sell us oil at a consistent and reasonable price and then increase production if unseemly market forces drive the world price of a barrel too high for U.S. consumers. In exchange we arm the Saudis to the teeth and turn a blind eye to their medieval approach to crime and punishment.

According to Seymour Hersh the power of Prince Bandar and the Saudi lobby was so great that Bandar effectively joined the Bush administration as a virtual member of the cabinet.

George Washington University Professor Hossein Askari blames the "power of the Saudi lobby in Washington" for the failure of the American government to defend the democracy protesters in Bahrain in 2011. According to Askari, "our marriage to the Al-Sauds threatens our (American) national security."

=== Role of Bandar bin Sultan ===
In the assessment of The Economist, "No Arab ambassador—perhaps no ambassador—has come close to matching Prince Bandar's influence in the American capital. At the height of his powers he was indispensable to both sides: in Mr Ottaway's words, "at once the king's exclusive messenger and the White House's errand boy". The Prince's "feats" of lobbying legerdemain included securing the purchase of AWACS surveillance aircraft in the teeth of fierce Israeli and congressional opposition, and augmenting his influence with the Reagan administration by quietly supplying $32m to the Contras in Nicaragua and $10m to anti-communist politicians in Italy.

==== Atlantic Council and The Centre for Strategic and International Studies ====
The Atlantic Council received $2 million in 2015 from the United Arab Emirates and benefactors close to Saudi Arabia.

The Centre for Strategic and International Studies (CSIS) received $600,000 in 2015 from Riyadh and Abu Dhabi.

== Lobbying firms ==
In the first decade of the 21st century, the Saudis paid approximately $100 million to American firms to lobby the American government.

Major lobbying firms that work as lobbyists in the pay of the Saudi government include Hill & Knowlton, which has been employed to lobby for Saudi Arabia since 1982. Qorvis Communications has worked for Saudi Arabia since the 9/11 attacks, receiving over $60.3 million over the course of a decade. Hogan Lovells U.S., L.L.P., formerly Hogan & Harston, worked for Saudi Arabia in 2009. The Loeffler Group, LLP, headed by former Congressman Tom Loeffler of Texas, was paid $10.5 million by the Saudi government during the first decade of the century, and gave Sandler Innocenzi, Inc. $8.9 million. Patton Boggs, LLP, earned over $3 million from Saudi Arabia for lobbying in the first decade of the century.

The Middle East Policy Council has received large payments from Saudi Arabia to lobby for the Kingdom, including $1 million in 2007.

A partial list of firms that have been paid by Saudi Arabia to lobby the American government includes:

- Akin Gump Strauss Hauer & Feld LLP: $220,770
- Boland & Madigan, Inc: $420,000
- Burson-Marsteller: $3,619,286.85
- Cambridge Associates, Ltd.: $8,505
- Cassidy & Associates, Inc: $720,000
- DNX Partners, LLC: $225,000
- Dutton & Dutton, PC: $3,694,350
- Fleishman-Hillard: $6,400,000
- Gallagher Group, LLC: $612,337.37
- Iler Interests, LP: $388,231.14
- Loeffler Tuggey Pauerstein Rosenthal, LLP: $2,350,457.12
- Loeffler, Jonas & Tuggey, LLP: $1,260,000
- MPD Consultants, LLP: $1,447,267.13
- Powell Tate, Inc: $900,732.77

Since 2015, Saudi Arabia paid $18 million to 145 registered lobbyists to influence the U.S. government.

A partial list of lobbyists that have been paid by Saudi Arabia to lobby for the Kingdom: the Podesta Group, founded by John Podesta and Tony Podesta, the Glover Park Group, former Senator Norm Coleman, H.P. Goldfield, vice chair of Madeleine Albright's Albright Stonebridge Group, the BGR Group, the Brownstein Hyatt Farber Schreck, the Squire Patton Boggs, the DLA Piper, the Pillsbury Winthrop Shaw Pittman, and the Qorvis/MSLGroup.

== See also ==
- Saudi Arabia–United States relations
- Arab lobby in the United States
