= Ritesh Arya =

Indian geologist (born 1968)

- Born: 20 August 1968 (age 58); Shimla, Himachal Pradesh, India
- Education: Center of Advanced Study in Geology, Panjab University
- Known for: Hydrogeology, Geothermal exploration, Climate Change
- Scientific career
- Fields: Geology, hydrogeology
- Workplaces: International Sustainable Energy Organization (IESO); Water Management Board, Government of Himachal Pradesh; National Institute of Hydrology Roorkee; Groundwater Organisation, Irrigation and Public Health (IPH)
- Thesis: Biostratigraphy, Paleo-Climate, tectonics, evolution and environment of Kasauli Himalayas (1997)

Ritesh Arya is an Indian geologist known for finding water at multiple locations in the high-altitude cold and mountainous desert of Ladakh, including the Siachen Glacier, which has made him a Guinness World Records holder. In 2014 he was Director Water and Geothermal Section at the International Sustainable Energy Organization (ISEO).

== Life ==
Ritesh Arya was born in Shimla on 20 Aug 1968. He had his primary education from St Edward Shimla and high school from St Mary's Convent School Kasauli. He did his pre-medical from DAV Chandigarh but soon realized that dissections on animals were not his cup of tea. He joined BSc (Hons School) in the Center of Advanced Study in Geology, Panjab University, Chandigarh and did his Master's and Ph.D. from there. He has an interest in fossils, groundwater, tectonics, climate, and geothermal.

=== Fossils ===
During his graduation days, he was inspired by Medlicott who had collected fossils from the Kasauli club in 1864. Since Arya belonged to Kasauli, he started collecting fossils during his graduation days, which culminated in his Ph.D. degree, but his love for fossils continued. His collection included fossils of leaves, flowers, stems, roots, vertebrates, molluscs, and insect wings most of which were the first report from the Kasauli Himalayas. . He presented his findings in Seminar marking the 25th celebration of Wadia Institute of Himalayan Geology in 1993 and later in 1994 he also presented the same in the International Geological Correlation Program 355 on Neogene evolution of Pacific Ocean gateways Inter-University Seminar House, Kansai JAPAN organized by Prof Nishimura in Japan 1994. Of great interest was the 1st mammal cusp fossil identified as the oldest Rhinoceros fossil from Kasauli Formation and numerous fossil leaves identified by scientists of Birbal Sahni Institute of Paleobotany (now paleosciences) belonging to genus Garcinia, Gluta, Combretum and Syzygium. Today these fossils are not found in the Himalayas but are confined to Andaman Nicobar island, Indonesia and Malaysia. Implies that Kasauli sediments belonging to the lower Miocene age were near the equator at the time of deposition and the Himalayas were not born till 20 million years ago. His interest in fossils continued and he discovered fossils of palms from the high-altitude 13000feet, cold mountain desserts of Stok in UT Ladakh.

=== Groundwater ===
In 1993 he joined the Groundwater Organisation, Government of Himachal Pradesh as a hydrogeologist to explore groundwater resources in the Himalayas which were earlier considered to devoid of groundwater resources. In 1996 he coined the word Hydrostratigraphy and divided the Himalayas into 7 hydrostratigraphic zones based on borewell samples. He prepared a Conceptual model to explain occurrences and movement of groundwater resources in the entire Himalayas and presented the same in 1996 International Geological Congress Beijing China

In 1996, following a request from the office of His Holiness Dalai Lama to help in providing potable water to 3800 natives of Sonamling Tibetan Settlement in Choglamsar. These were those Tibetans who had fled Tibet following Chinese aggression in 1959 along with the Dalai Lama and settled in these high-altitude cold mountain deserts of the world. Arya successfully explored the region which was at that time considered to be devoid of groundwater. In 1997 Water Aid funded a project to find drinking water for around 3800 Tibetans living in and around Leh. This included Choglamsar, Spituk, Nyoma, Sumdo and Hanle.

He left his government job and established his own company 'Arya Driller' in working on a "No Water, No Money" basis. Arya was part of the team who managed to find the required water, further drilled 25 borewells to make that water accessible.

Arya then helped make drinking water available at Air Force Station Leh and Thoise. He worked in close association with the scientists of the Defence Research Development Organisation (DRDO) to provide water for irrigation for the Field Research Laboratory in Leh and Partapur. Groundwater-based agriculture increased the production by 50%

During Kargil War, he was exploring and provided groundwater to the troops stationed in Siachen, Kargil, Drass, Khumbathang Since 1999 he has been providing potable water in difficult terrains for the military bases and along the border across Ladakh including Thoise, Phobrang, Chushul, Partapur, Sasoma, Rezang La and Tangtse.

He also worked with civil authorities to provide water to the civil population and also under the Sadhbavana project. Kushok Bakula Rimpochee Airport, Batalik and DRDO laboratory aside, Arya found water at nearly 50 locations connected to the Indian Army's XIV Corps.

In 2020 during GALWAN conflict with China he was called by the Indian army to explore groundwater at eastern Ladakh in Galwan and DBO where he discovered 2 paleolakes 10000 years old at DBO, which was the center of OLD SILK ROUTE in those times.

=== Geothermal ===
In 2008 he was in Oslo to present a paper at the International Geological Congress Oslo. In 2010 he was part of the INDNOR an Indo-Norway joint venture project funded by the Research Council of Norwayto study geothermal sites in the Himalayas. He introduced Agneyodgara (lava Energy) and firmly believed that Geothermal energy alone can solve the energy problem in remote areas of Ladakh specially Chumathang and Puga in a sustainable way. This concept was rated among the Top 10 innovations by Guardian in World Future Energy Summit 2010 Abu Dhabi. In 2010 he presented his paper on Geothermal as Tourist destination in Himalayas in World Geothermal Congress Bali Indonesia. He was able to explore and develop lukewarm water for Indian army @ Siachen Base camp with the aim to decrease dependency on fossil fuel. In 2016 he was cohost of the World Clean Energy Conference in the UN City of Geneva and shared the dais with his mentor and friend Gustav R Grob President of the International Sustainable Energy Organisation ISEO Geneva

=== Climate ===
After the reports of Man-made Global warming were published by IPCC in 2007, Arya who was working in Higher Himalayas was carefully observing the glacial remains, geological and geomorphological features, and the borewell samples and tried to relate it with paleoclimates. He found that majority of the glaciers had receded and become extinct in the Himalayas much before industrialization started and based on geological and geomorphological shreds of evidence proposed Arya's C Cycle on climate change C cycles because the geomorphic features he found in the granites of Ladakh Batholith represented alphabet C . He concluded that Climate Change is a natural cyclic process consisting of warming and cooling cycles. Man creates pollution and not changes in Climate He concluded that Global warming is the best part to be on this planet earth and did a TEDx talk "Enjoy Global Warming - Its the best part to be on this planet earth"

=== Floods ===
In 2010, Leh floods claimed more than 200 plus lives on the night of 5 August. Dr. Arya had predicted flash floods induced due to global warming in an International Seminar organized by Military Engineering Services in Leh and in 2010 he was trapped in a flash flood.

He worked on the flood sites and based on the pieces of evidence collected he concluded that the Leh floods were caused due to Reservoir Wall Rupture Mechanism paper was published in NIDM Journal Disaster & Development Vol. 5, No. 1 & 2, April & November 2011

=== Earthquakes ===
Arya based on geological evidences collected across the Himalayas from the foothills of the Shivalik to the Indus Tsangpo Suture Zone and beyond firmly believed that Himalayas are accumulation of various geological formations consisting of various rocks of different geological ages representing different environment which have been placed side by side today by various forces of tectonics which moved the Indian plate towards Eurasian plate thereby squeezing the sediments of the Tethys Sea which was once separating India from the Tibetan landmass. Resulting in trusting of older formations over the younger formations thereby creating week zones leading to frequent seismic activities which we witness today. According to him “Hill stations near Chandigarh are geologically upside down hence prone to seismic activity” Arya discovered the signatures of paleoseismic activity in Spituk Leh Ladakh. He was able to demonstrate the seismic activity and the bursting of the paleolake at Spituk around 1000 years ago. He concluded that geological investigations are being ignored while constructing roads and widening them which leads to landslides which become erratic and cause danger to the life of the people.

=== Geoheritage and geotourism ===
Geoheritage preservation can educate the students and tourists about the rich heritage and culture of the area by helping them understand the life, climate, and geographic position of India in the geological past based on rocks and fossil record. This will also promote tourism which will help increase the socio-economic status of the people living in the remote region. A geo heritage walk was organized by Arya to promote geotourism in the region .

A marathon was organized from Sukhna Lake in Chandigarh to Renuka Lake in Himachal to show the importance of mountain lakes in preserving and conserving freshwater reserves on one hand and promoting geotourism in those areas

A geoheritage calendar of Kasauli and Ladakh was prepared and presented to JP Nadha and Member of Parliament Ladakh to highlight various sites of geoheritage importance in the Himalayas .

Currently, he is dedicated to the establishment of the Tethys Fossil Museum of Evolution @Dangyari a small village in Kasauli Tehsil of Himachal Pradesh, which will showcase fossils collected from various parts of the Himalayas. The primary objective of this museum is to raise awareness among students, children, and the administration about the region's abundant fossil geoheritage. The museum aims to demonstrate how fossils contribute to our understanding of evolution and extinction. Furthermore, it seeks to preserve and conserve sites of geological significance, particularly in remote areas where these fossils are found. By promoting geotourism, the museum intends to highlight the geological importance of these locations and attract visitors to explore these unique sites.

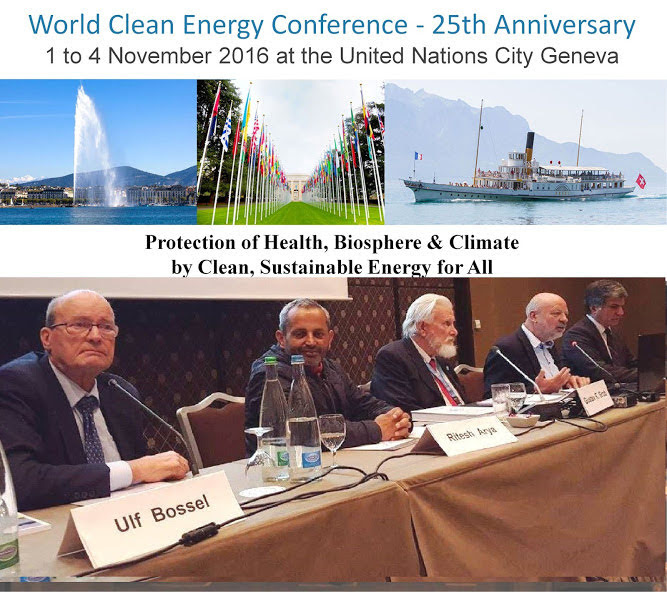

Discovery Channel

He featured in Discovery channel as an expert hydrogeologist to explain the science behind the making of Ram Sethu in "Legends of Ramayana".

Guinness World Record

In 2003 Arya made his name in the Guinness World Records for exploring and drilling the highest artesian condition (borewell) in the world at for the Indian Army. and presented his findings in World Water Week Stockholm in 2009.
