= Organization of Arab Petroleum Exporting Countries =

Kuwait-based energy policy coordinating organization

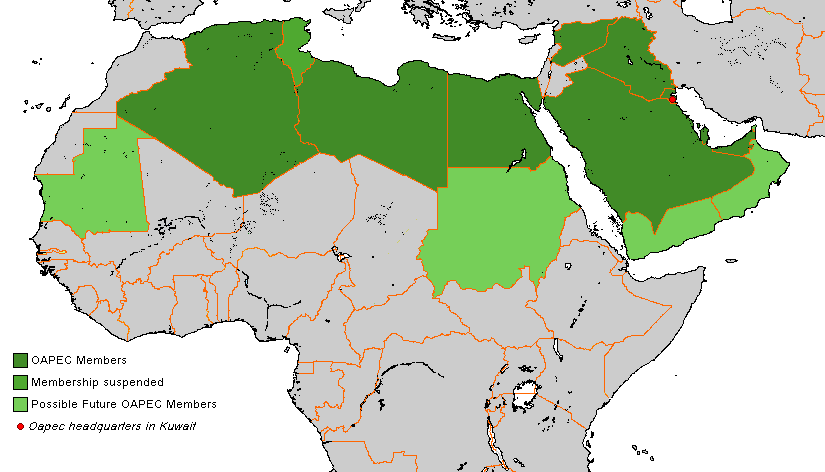
- A map of OAPEC Members and their status
- Administrative center: Kuwait
- Official language: Arabic
- Type: Intergovernmental organization
- Membership: Member states: Algeria; Bahrain; Egypt; Iraq; Kuwait; Libya; Qatar; Saudi Arabia; Syria; United Arab Emirates; Suspended members: Tunisia

Leaders
  - Secretary General: Khalid Al-Otaibi
- Establishment: January 9, 1968; 58 years ago
- Website www.oapecorg.org/Home

The Organization of Arab Petroleum Exporting Countries (OAPEC; Arabic: منظمة الأقطار العربية المصدرة للبترول) is a multi-governmental organization headquartered in Kuwait which coordinates energy policies among oil-producing Arab states. OAPEC's primary objective is safeguarding the cooperation of numerous members in various aspects of economic activity within the oil industry as well as maintaining strong relations among themselves; to provide means to preserve the members' individual and collective efforts within the industry; unite on-going efforts for the procurement of oil; provide access to consumer markets on fair and reasonable terms; and provide conditions, adequate capital, and experience of investors in the oil industry.

== History ==
On 9 January 1968, three of the then–most conservative Arab oil states – Kuwait, Libya, and Saudi Arabia – agreed at a conference in Beirut, Lebanon, to found the Organization of Arab Petroleum Exporting Countries, aiming to separate the production and sale of oil from politics in the wake of the halfhearted 1967 oil embargo, in response to the Six-Day War. Such use of the economic weapon of oil embargo in the struggle against Israel had been regularly proposed at Arab Petroleum Congresses, but it took the Six-Day War for the embargo to happen. However, Saudi Arabia's oil production was up by 9% that year, and the main embargo lasted only ten days and was completely ended by the Khartoum Conference.

OAPEC was originally intended to be a conservative Arab political organization which, by restricting membership to countries whose main export was oil, would exclude governments seen as radical – such as those of Egypt and Algeria. This organizational exclusivity was bolstered by an additional rule in the organization's charter requiring the three founders' approval of all new members. The original aim was to control the economic weapon of potential oil embargo and prevent its use caused by popular emotion.

Iraq initially declined to join, preferring to work under the umbrella of the Arab League, considering OAPEC too conservative. Equally, the three founders considered Iraq too radical to be desirable as a member.

By early 1972, the criterion for admission had changed to oil being a significant source of revenue (rather than the principal source) of a prospective member nation. Algeria, Iraq, Syria and Egypt were admitted. Consequently, OAPEC became a much more activist organization, contrary to the original intention.

The 1973 oil crisis was a turning point for the organization. In October of that year, the forces of Egypt and Syria attempted to overwhelm the state of Israel in an offensive later known as the Yom Kippur War. On 16 October, ten days after the war's start, Kuwait hosted separate meetings of both OAPEC and the Persian Gulf members of OPEC, including Iran. OAPEC resolved to cut oil production by 5% monthly "until the Israeli forces are completely evacuated from all the Arab territories occupied in the June 1967 war".

The embargo lasted for some five months before it was lifted in March 1974 after negotiations at the Washington Oil Summit. The embargo's after-effects lingered through the rest of the decade and beyond. For the oil-exporting countries, the embargo was the first experience of leveraging their collective production for political gains. A number of the member nations would use this sense of control to renegotiate the contracts they had made with the companies that had discovered and exploited their resources. The vastly increased revenues would prove addictive, and a unified OAPEC oil embargo was never again possible.

In 1979, Egypt was expelled from OAPEC for signing the Camp David Accords. It was readmitted a decade later.

In 1982, the Arab League's Arab Petroleum Congress (founded in 1959) merged into OAPEC's Arab Energy Conference (founded in 1979), which has continued to meet periodically to at least 2014.

OAPEC is regarded as a regional, specialized international organization focusing on organizing cooperation in oil development, collective projects, and regional integration.

== Organizational structure ==
OAPEC consists of the Council of Ministers that holds the supreme authority over the Executive Bureau, the General Secretariat, and the Judicial Tribunal. The Council of Ministers is formed by each member state's minister of petroleum and they work together to construct general policy and ensure the organization's goals and actions are being achieved and implemented. The Executive Bureau assists the Council of Ministers by meet at least three times a year to review the budget, approve staff regulations, and develops an agenda for the Council of Ministers depending on their analyses of the organizations activities. One senior official from each member state serves on the Executive Bureau.

The General Secretariat is led by the Secretary General, who is currently Jamal Essa Al Loughani, and includes four departments: Finance and Administrative Affairs; Information and Library; Economics; and Technical Affairs. The Economics Department and the Technical Affairs Department jointly form the Arab Center for Energy Studies, established in 1983.

The Judicial Tribunal mitigates disputes between member states; interpretations of the OAPEC Agreement; disputes with a petroleum company operating in its member states' territory, and anything else that falls into OAPEC's jurisdiction or that the Council of Ministers submits to the tribunal. The Judicial Tribunal must unevenly consist of at least seven and no more than eleven judges from Arab countries. The tribunal's judgments are final and binding, and will be enforceable within the territories of residing members.

== Member countries ==
As of December 2020, OAPEC has 11 member countries, 6 of which are also OPEC members. Sudan, Somalia, and Somaliland are not members. Somalia has oil drills planned with concession company TPAO in sea regions offshore, and the breakaway region of Somaliland has advanced oil drills in production agreement contracts as part of Arab League countries With OPEC membership planned, Somalia oil estimates are around 30 billion barrels of crude.

== See also ==
- Arab lobby in the United States
- List of countries by oil production
