= Glutinous rice sausage =

Regional snack of Guangdong Province, China

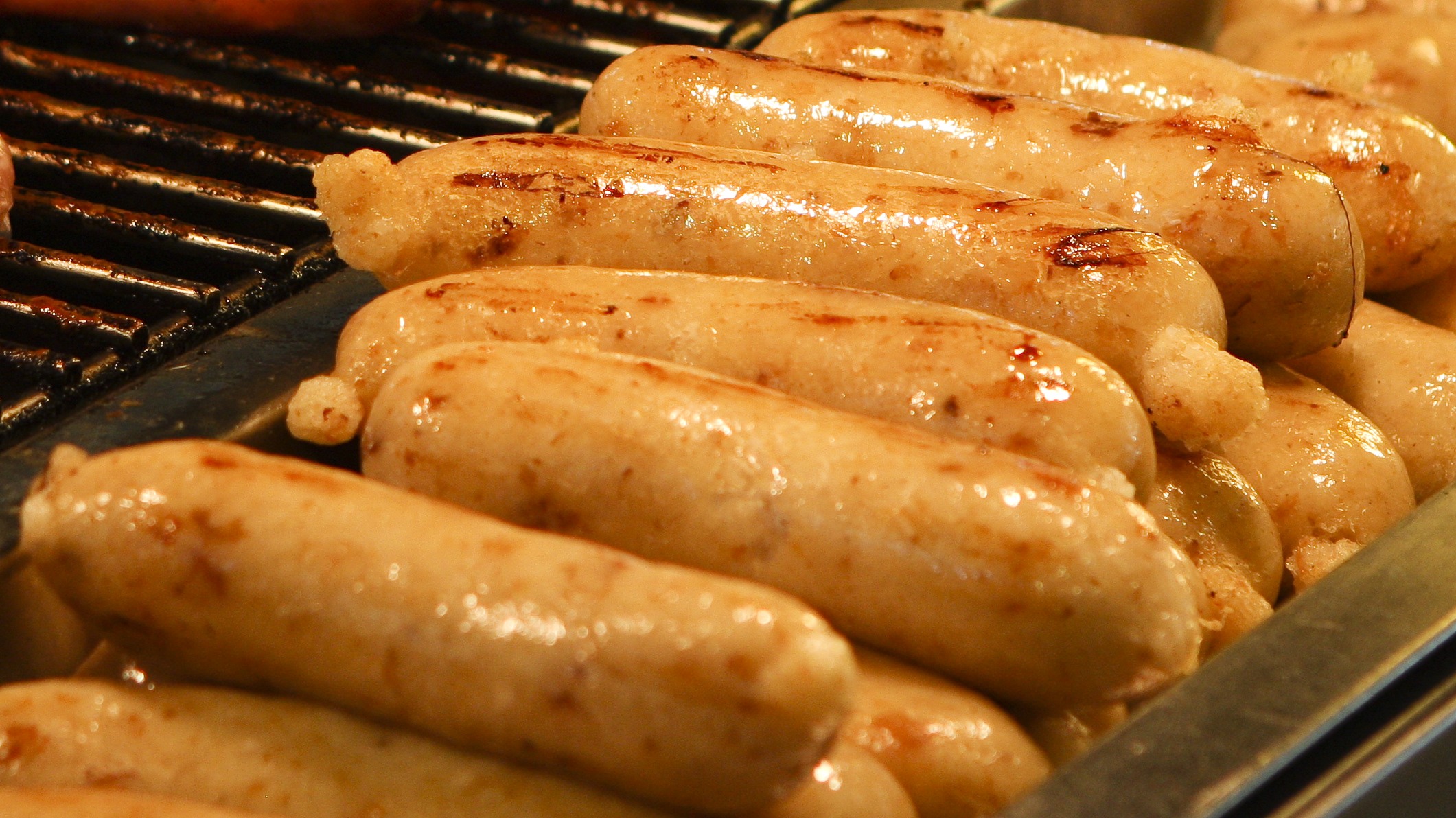
Glutinous Rice Sausage

Glutinous rice sausage (豬腸脹糯米; Teochew Peng'im: de¹‑tên⁵ dên³ lo⁶‑bi²; lit. Pig Intestine Stuffed with Glutinous Rice; aka. 糯米腸; Chinese: nuò mǐ cháng) is a classic traditional local snack in Hongyang, Puning Ancient City, Chaoshan region of Guangdong Province. It is also a traditional street food and delicacy that is very popular among Teochew people in Chaoshan, Hong Kong and Southeast Asia.

In Fujian and Taiwan, there is a similar dish with the same core ingredients: pig intestines and glutinous rice. It is also called large intestine ring (大腸箍; tuā-tn̂g-khoo) or simply large intestine (大腸; Chinese: Tuā-tn̂g).

== Preparations ==
Pig intestine stuffed with glutinous rice belongs to the broader category of sausages, with glutinous rice as the main filling. The essence of this dish lies in its layered savory flavour inside and its unique sweetness on the outside.

=== Teochew glutinous rice sausage ===
The casing is taken from the middle section of pig large intestines and must be thoroughly cleaned with salt and starch until completely odorless. The filling is raw glutinous rice, which needs to be soaked, mixed with various ingredients, such as pork belly, shiitake mushrooms, Teochew preserved daikon (菜脯), dried shrimp, lotus seeds, peanuts, and shallots, and then seasoned with fish sauce, soy sauce, and five-spice powder. The stuffing process is crucial. The filling is loosely stuffed into the casing, leaving space for the glutinous rice to expand. The ends of the casing are tied tightly with string. The cooking method is also simple: simmer over low heat for about an hour. Once cooked, the sausage is sliced into thick, cross-sectional rounds. It is traditionally drizzled with a thick, sweet black soy sauce (often infused with sugar or maltose) and sprinkled with toasted white sesame seeds or crushed peanuts.

=== Taiwanese and Fujian glutinous rice sausage ===
Taiwanese version has evolved its own identity in terms of ingredients, regional names, and street-food culture. Teochew filling includes pork belly, shiitake mushrooms, dried shrimp, lotus seeds, peanuts, and shallots. Taiwanese filling, on the other hand, is closer to Fujian filling, characterized by its simpler ingredients but richer flavor, primarily consisting of fried shallots, white pepper, and peanuts. (Taiwanese fillings rarely include shiitake mushrooms or pork belly like Teochew fillings.)

Taiwanese glutinous‑rice sausage can be enjoyed in many different ways, such as charcoal‑grilled or deep‑fried (or air fried), and even in the popular hot‑dog‑style snack known as "big sausage wrapping small sausage."

=== Korean Sundae ===
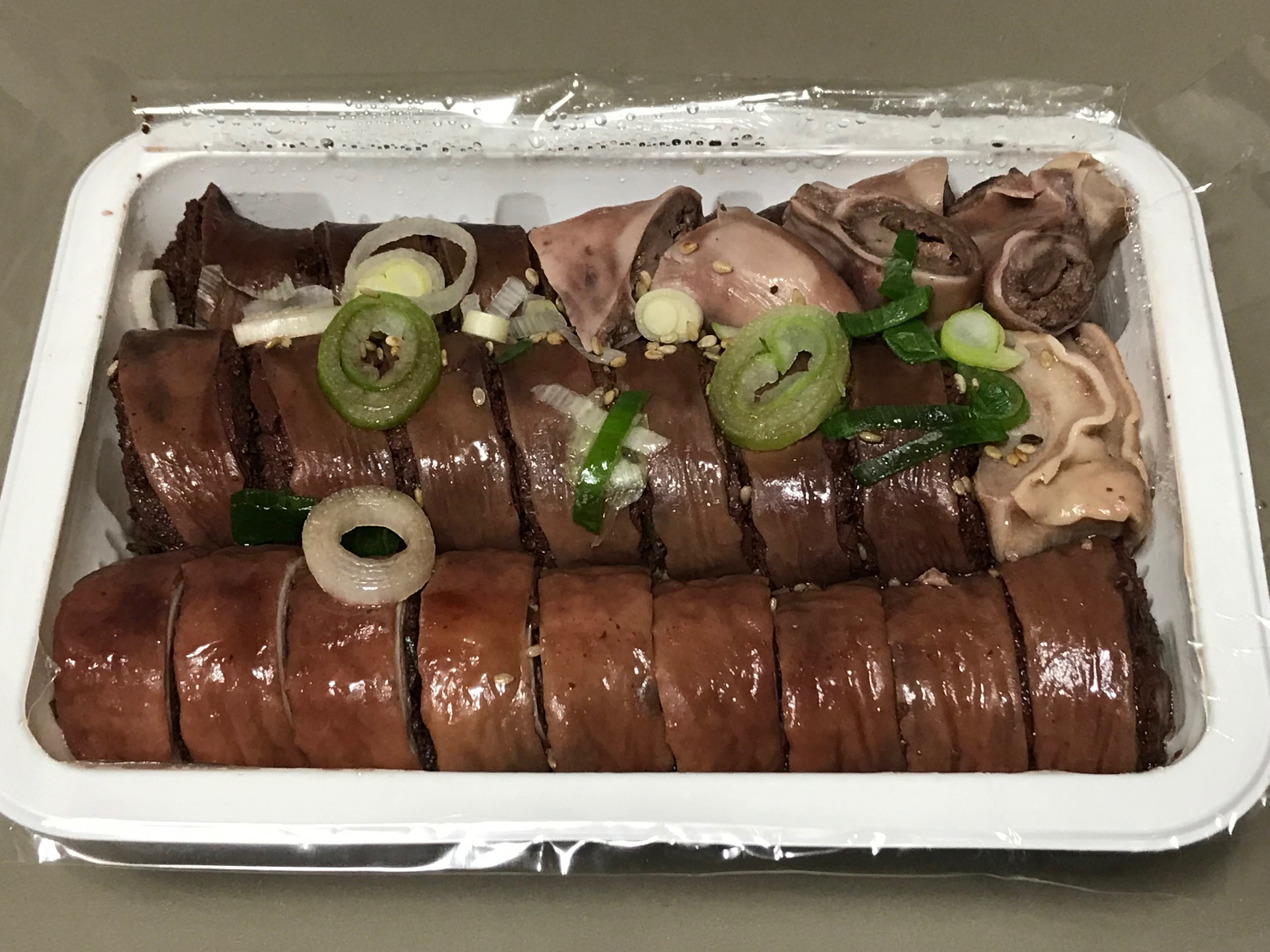
Korean sundae

Korea has similar dishes, called sundae, but the difference is that sundae contains pig's blood.
