= Lobby register =

Public database

A lobby registry, also named lobbyist registry, register for lobby transparency or registry of lobbyists is a public database, in which information about lobbying actors and key data about their actions can be accessed.

Its aim is to gain transparency about possible influences of interest groups on parliamentarians and their staff. Several studies indicate that lobby transparency leads to a decrease of corruption. Registers exist for political committees of several countries. Their effectiveness is rated differently, strongly depending on their exact regulations. Many non-mandatory registers do not include powerful lobbyists.

== Positions and considerations ==
Register opponents mainly argued in a survey that there would be no need for regulations, since it would be self-regulating and that they would fear a barrier of free exchange of views. Different from the US, West European countries had only weak lobby regulations for a long time. Authors of a study interpreted that the early West-European politic was not focusing the concept of lobby transparency to gain public confidence into political processes, but rather on promoting economic development by enabling undisturbed communication between politics and economy. This setting of priorities is currently changing due to scandals and public pressure.

== Regulation details ==
Many non-governmental organizations (NGOs) see means of controlling and sanction to handle missing or wrong entries as a central prerequisite for a working register. In many cases there are complains that this has not been put into practice.

Making an entry only mandatory if a certain threshold of money or time is spent on lobbying should prevent an inappropriately high bureaucratic burden for small actors (for example) in the US. Similar mechanisms are popular among supporters of a register.

Implementation as a database is favored over a list format since it allows not only searches but also enables data analysis and graphical representations.

=== Contained data ===
Most registers contain at least the following data:

- Identity of the lobbyist
- contracting entity
- motivations/goals
- financial means

A survey among lobbyists conducted by the Organization for Economic Co-operation and Development (OECD) revealed, that a majority of them would support a mandatory register and publication of the data above (excluding financial information). Some registers, for example the Canadian, require much more data.

== Lobby registers in different countries ==
=== United States ===
A mandatory, publicly accessible and processable lobby register with enforced financial disclosure and theoretical high punishments exists on federal level, as well as in every state besides Pennsylvania. A register was introduced in the US in 1946 with the Lobbying Act. Loopholes in the regulation lead to the fact that only 4 000 of 13 000 lobbyists were registered, before the rules of disclosure were substituted by the stricter Lobbying Disclosure Act of 1995. In 2007 this was extended by the Honest Leadership and Open Government Act with more precise definitions and more powerful means of sanction. The data published by this register is relatively informative. But it has been criticized that complaints lead to no action.

=== Canada ===
Canada was putting a Lobbyist Registration Act into operation in 1989. This was extended regularly to comply with higher demands about data given, to extend the applying field of scope and to enable more powerful means of sanction. Maximum punishments are two years in prison and 200,000 Canadian $ ^{(ca. 190,000 US $ or 140,000 EUR)}. The strong regulations about lobby transparency demand lobbyists to report about their activity on a monthly basis. This includes the information, with which members of parliament or their staff they interacted and about which topics they spoke. The conduct has a law status, is equipped with sanctional power and is controlled by an independent office.

Lobbyists shall not place public office holders in a conflict of interest by proposing or undertaking any action that would constitute an improper influence on a public office holder.

— The Lobbyists' Code of Conduct - Rule 8

Complaints are pursued publicly, violations have been prosecuted legally in practice. In the Canadian provinces of Alberta, British Columbia, Newfoundland, Nova Scotia, Quebec and Ontario similar regulations were introduced.

=== European Union ===
The Transparency Register is a voluntary lobbyist register operated jointly by the European Parliament and the EU Commission since June 2011. Its coverage extends beyond lobbyists to law firms, NGOs, and think tanks, and it includes information on staff numbers, the legislative proposals they have attempted to influence, and the amount of EU funding they have received. It should be appealing that only registered lobbyists are granted passes that ease access to the parliament. As maximum means of sanction a commented deletion of the entry out of the registry and a withdrawal of the access pass is possible. The transparency gained by this register is seen as minor, since entries are voluntary, were drawn back arbitrarily by lobbyist in the past and incorrect information (which the co-signed code of conduct does not officially allow) is not sanctioned in practice. The register is however in an evaluation phase and there is the prospect of further improvement. The European Parliament is still working to transform it into a mandatory register, while the EU Commission is reluctant. First the reason given for this was that there would be no legal base. After a legal study disproved this, the EU Commission agreed that it was juristically possible, but stated that the current voluntary approach was sufficient. The need for a mandatory EU transparency register has also been highlighted by the anti-corruption organisation, Transparency International which has argued for the need to create a robust and credible mandatory register which would serve to increase the public trust in the EU institutions.

==== Legislative footprint ====
It has been planned by the EU Parliament in 2011 to publish a legislative footprint in the appendices of legislative reports. This should list all lobbyists that were in contact with the members of parliament or influenced them during the creation of the law text.

Eventually on 31 January 2019 the EU Parliament adopted binding rules on lobby transparency. Amending its Rules of Procedure, the Parliament stipulated that MEPs involved in drafting and negotiating legislation must publish online their meetings with lobbyists. The amendment says that “rapporteurs, shadow rapporteurs or committee chairs shall, for each report, publish online all scheduled meetings with interest representatives falling under the scope of the Transparency Register”-database of the EU.

=== United Kingdom ===
There is a voluntary register in the United Kingdom since 2011, but some NGOs criticize it as ineffective.

=== Germany ===
A mandatory lobby register came into force in Germany on 1 January 2022, along with a code of conduct. These were implemented by the Fourth Merkel cabinet. The scope of the register and code of conduct were widely criticized as insufficient, both by the opposition parties and the Council of Europe's anti-corruption monitoring body.

Since 1972 associations can voluntarily be included in a list reciting their contact data, head and representatives, general interests of the association and the number of their members. The list is limited to associations and there is no data about self-employed lobbyists, lawyers, think tanks and NGOs. There is no financial information and the registration is voluntary. A regulation making a registry in the list mandatory for trade associations to be heard in the Parliament was put out of force later. Many NGOs do not see this list as a means to further promote lobby transparency in Germany. Several initiatives of members of parliament in the opposition (social, left wing and green party) were denied by government (consisting of the conservatives and liberals 2009-2013).

In June 2016 the proposal of the opposition was turned down in the Bundestag. In the debate preceding the voting Hans-Peter Uhl, CSU, judiciary of the conservative coalition, warned about the "discrimination and stigmatization" of interest groups. Presenting and discussing individual interests should not be criminalized.

The German states Brandenburg and Rhineland-Palatinate have de facto voluntary lists for associations that are comparable to the list on federal level.

=== Austria ===
In Austria a mandatory lobby register with duty of disclosure including financial information and means of sanction was put into force. The register is still in the early phase, some deadlines to register end 2014, many lawyers wait for clarification by a court's decision and did not register.

=== Further countries ===
Further registers have been set up in Australia (in the year 2011), Denmark, France (2010), Ireland, Israel (2008), Lithuania (2001), Macedonia (2008), Netherlands (2012), Poland (2005), Slovenia (2010), Taiwan, Hungary (2006-2011). In some cases long-term-experiences do not yet exist, in some cases the need for improvement is already seen today.

== See also ==
- Lobbying in the United States
- Lobbying in the United Kingdom
- Freedom of information laws by country
