= Democracy International eV =

International non-governmental organisation

Democracy International e. V.
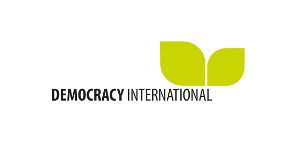
- Founded: 30 June 2011
- Type: registered association (= eingetragener Verein e. V.)
- Location: Köln, Germany.
- Website: www.democracy-international.org

Democracy International e.V. is an international non-governmental organisation (NGO) working on strengthening direct democracy and citizens' participation at local level, in the nation states and on the global level. Democracy International has been existing as a loose network of democracy activists since 2002. The organisation was formally established in June 2011 as a registered membership association (eingetragener Verein e.V.) according to German non-profit law. Democracy International is politically independent and funded by membership fees and individual donations. The headquarters are in Cologne, Germany.

== Organisation ==
Individual people and democracy groups of the council are both members of the organisation. The members elect Democracy International’s executive board at the general assembly, which is held at least every two years. The board steers the political course and represents the organisation externally.

Democracy groups with more than seven members can become a member of the council. The task of the council is to advise and to support the executive board with its work. Membership fees vary according to country of residence.

== Association work ==
Democracy International regularly runs campaigns to promote democracy.

It also organizes conferences, provides knowledge on direct democracy and publishes the Direct Democracy Navigator. This online-tool helps people to compare direct-democratic instruments all over the world.

=== Engagement for lobby-transparency ===
Democracy International accuses the European Union of a lack of transparency when it comes to lobbyism. Democracy International promotes more transparency and a mandatory lobby register. Amongst others the organization started a campaign in 2014, in which proposals of citizens to dam in lobbyism in Europe have been selected. Democracy International then handed over the results to Sven Giegold, the European Parliament's rapporteur in the “Report on Transparency, Integrity and Accountability”. Since the Commission is headed by Jean- Claude Juncker, a voluntary lobby register has been put in place. Democracy International campaigns to make this register mandatory.

=== Campaign for a transnational European electoral law ===
The organisation promotes a transnational European electoral law. Democracy International favors European-wide, transnational electoral lists in the European Parliamentary Elections to strengthen the link between the citizens of the European Union and the parties that represent them.

=== Organisational support ===
The association also supports other democracy activists with their campaigns. Democracy International has close connections to Mehr Demokratie e.V. Germany, Mehr Demokratie Austria, Meer Democratie, Demokratie.nu in Belgium, OMNIBUS für Direkte Demokratie and the ECI campaign.

=== Demand for a new European Convention ===
Facing the legal changes of the European Union, which are the result of the European stability mechanism and the European fiscal pact, the organisation calls for the convocation of a new European Convention. A convention is an assembly not only of representatives of politics, economy and civil society, but should also include citizens. Purpose of the assembly should be to give European citizens a direct say in the European Union’s decision-making. The aim is a democratic legitimated Europe. In 2014, the organisation started a campaign called ‚Democratic Europe Now‘, which is now a broad alliance of civil society groups from all of Europe. The association has established criteria for the composition of a new European Convention. To ensure maximum democratic legitimacy, it requires the Convention members to be not only representatives of the EU institutions and the Member States, but to include representatives from the civil society sector and/or representatives directly elected by the European citizens. Additionally, the meetings should be transparent and open to the public. Rather than elaborating proposals that are then to be decided by the presidency, the Convention members should directly determine what the final draft should entail. In addition, Democracy International requires sufficient time for serious and thorough deliberation. The new Convention must give the working groups more than one year to complete their analyses and proposals. Participatory mechanisms should be in place, that allow citizens and civil society to give input and to contribute to the proceedings. To accomplish that the Convention needs to facilitate digital and traditional platforms for citizens and civil society. Finally, the results of the Convention process should be put to popular vote in all EU Member States on the same day, in a pan-European referendum.

=== Campaign for a European Citizens’ Initiative ===
In 2002 Democracy International together with numerous democracy activists throughout Europe campaigned for the inclusion of the European Citizens' Initiative (ECI) in the EU draft Constitutional Treaty, which then was integrated in the Treaty of Lisbon. The ECI requires one million signatures from at least seven EU Member States to suggest an EU law proposal to the European Commission. Since the launch of the ECI on 1 April 2012, Democracy International advocates that the ECI must become more citizen-friendly and that the general public must be more aware of the first tool of direct democracy at transnational level.

In 2015 Democracy International has been campaigning for a reform of the European Citizens' Initiative. Window of opportunity was the revision of the ECI - the EU regulation on the European Citizens' Initiative demands a review of the ECI every three years. In this context of reform, Democracy International submitted to the EU institutions a set of reform proposals. Also, Democracy International run a broad campaign. The petition "Save the ECI", which French economist Thomas Piketty and the German political scientist Gesine Schwan both supported, was the core element of this campaign. More than 75,000 citizens from all across the EU signed the petition that Democracy International together with Mehr Demokratie e.V. and WeMove.eu handed over to the EU Parliament in Strasbourg on 28 October 2015. On the same day, the European Parliament adopted the report on the European Citizens' Initiative, which contained seven out of nine reform proposals by Democracy International. On 16 August 2017 Democracy International handed over 100,000 signatures of Europeans demanding a reinforcement of the ECI. The Commission published its proposal for a reinforced ECI by mid-September 2017. Democracy International had made eleven recommendations to the Commission. Two of them were fully accepted, six were partially accepted and three were either rejected or not mentioned. The revised ECI is expected to be in effect by the next European elections. Democracy International continues to campaign for a stronger follow up to successful ECIs.

=== Building a global network ===
Democracy International seeks to provide opportunities for activists and organisations who work on democracy to network and exchange ideas. The „Global Forum on Modern Direct Democracy“, which takes place every two years, is the central platform connecting specialists, activists and organisations working on this subject internationally.

== Research & publications ==
Democracy International regularly issues monitoring reports and position papers on direct democracy issues. The reports assess referendums and plebiscites with international standards of direct democracy as set by the Venice Commission and leading experts on direct democracy.

Democracy International is a partner of the Direct Democracy Navigator, an information platform that lists legal instruments of direct democracy available throughout the world.
