= Egypt lobby in the United States =

Pro-Egypt groups and individuals in the U.S.

The Egypt lobby in the United States is a collection of lawyers, public relation firms and professional lobbyists paid directly by the Egyptian government to lobby the United States public and government on behalf of the interests of the Egyptian government.

== Goals ==
A key goal of Egypt's lobbyists is securing a large allocation of foreign aid; more than $50 billion in American aid has gone to the countrty since 1975. According to ProPublica, the massive amount of American aid has "enabled" the Egyptian government to postpone democratic reform.

== History ==
=== Mubarak regime ===
According to ProPublica, between 2007 to 2008, Egypt ranked sixth in a list of the number of meetings between lobbyists for foreign governments and congressmen.

During the Egyptian Crisis after the 2011 Egyptian revolution, the Egptian government hired Tony Podesta, Robert L. Livingston and Toby Moffett for $1.1 million annually to represent Egypt's interests in Washington. They successfully defeated nonbinding Senate Resolution 586 that called on Egypt to "curtail human rights abuses." The legislative success highlighted the influence of the Egypt lobby and was an example of the extent to which President Hosni Mubarak used lobbying to protect its interests in the United States. After initially defending the Egyptian government's crackdown on U.S.-funded nonprofits with talking points, the lobbyists dropped Egypt as a client.

In the lobbying campaign, a former Connecticut Representative, Toby Moffat, told his former colleagues that the bill "would be viewed as an insult" and that it would be wrong to insult an important ally. "We were just saying to them, 'Don't do this now to our friends in Egypt,'" he said. In the wake of President Mubarak's resignation, lobbyists Podesta, Moffat, and Livingston continue to share "a joint, multimillion-dollar (lobbying) contract with Egypt."

=== Sisi regime ===
In January 2017, the Egyptian General Intelligence Service (EGIS), also known as the Mukhabarat, hired public relations firms Weber Shandwick and its subsidiary Cassidy & Associates to lobby on Egypt's behalf in Washington, D.C., boost its image, and advocate for the Muslim Brotherhood to be listed as a Foreign Terrorist Organization for $1.8 million per year. It was the first known such engagement by the EGIS. According to analyst Mokhtar Awad, Egypt believed its relationship with the United States had suffered from poor public relations following a crackdown involving mass arrests and accusations of human rights abuses. In July, Weber Shandick ended its $1.2 million contract with EGIS after poor publicity associated with Egypt's human rights abuses. Cassidy & Associates expressed it would continue to represent the Egyptian government.

In addition to the EGIS contract, the Egyptian government also spent $2 million a year on lobbying services from Glover Park Group.

In response to Senator Rand Paul's introduction of legislation to end a $2.2 million sale of C-130 cargo planes to Egypt in 2022, the Egyptian Ministry of Foreign Affairs hired Brownstein Hyatt Farber Schreck. Brownstein exchanged emails and phone calls with Congressional staffers and placed an op-ed in Newsweek authored by Ambassador Motaz Zahra.
