= European Union lobbying =

Lobbying in the European Union

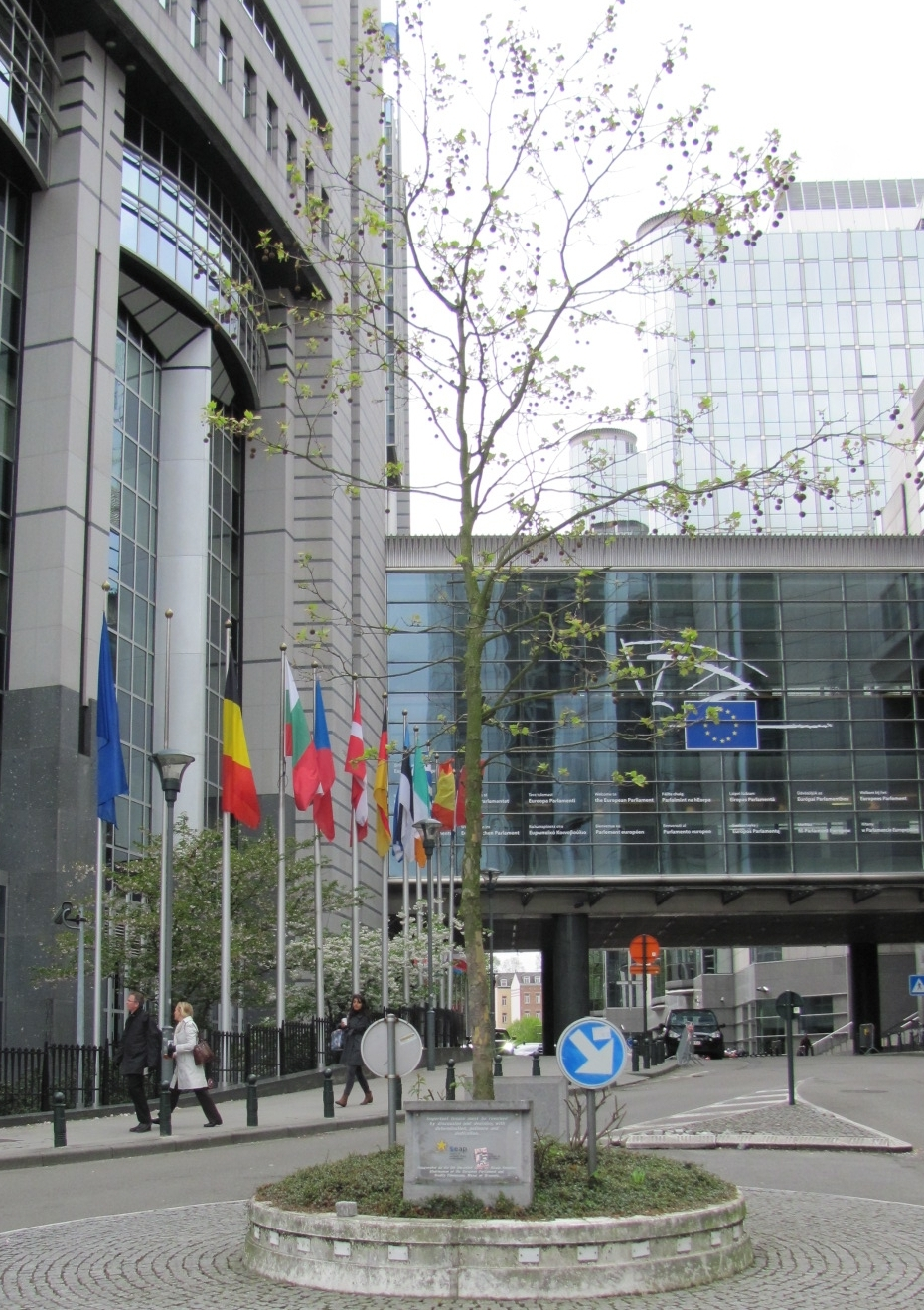
Wiertzstraat in Brussels. This 'lobby tree' in front of the main entrance of the European Parliament was planted in 2001 at the initiative of SEAP, the professional organisation of lobbyists.

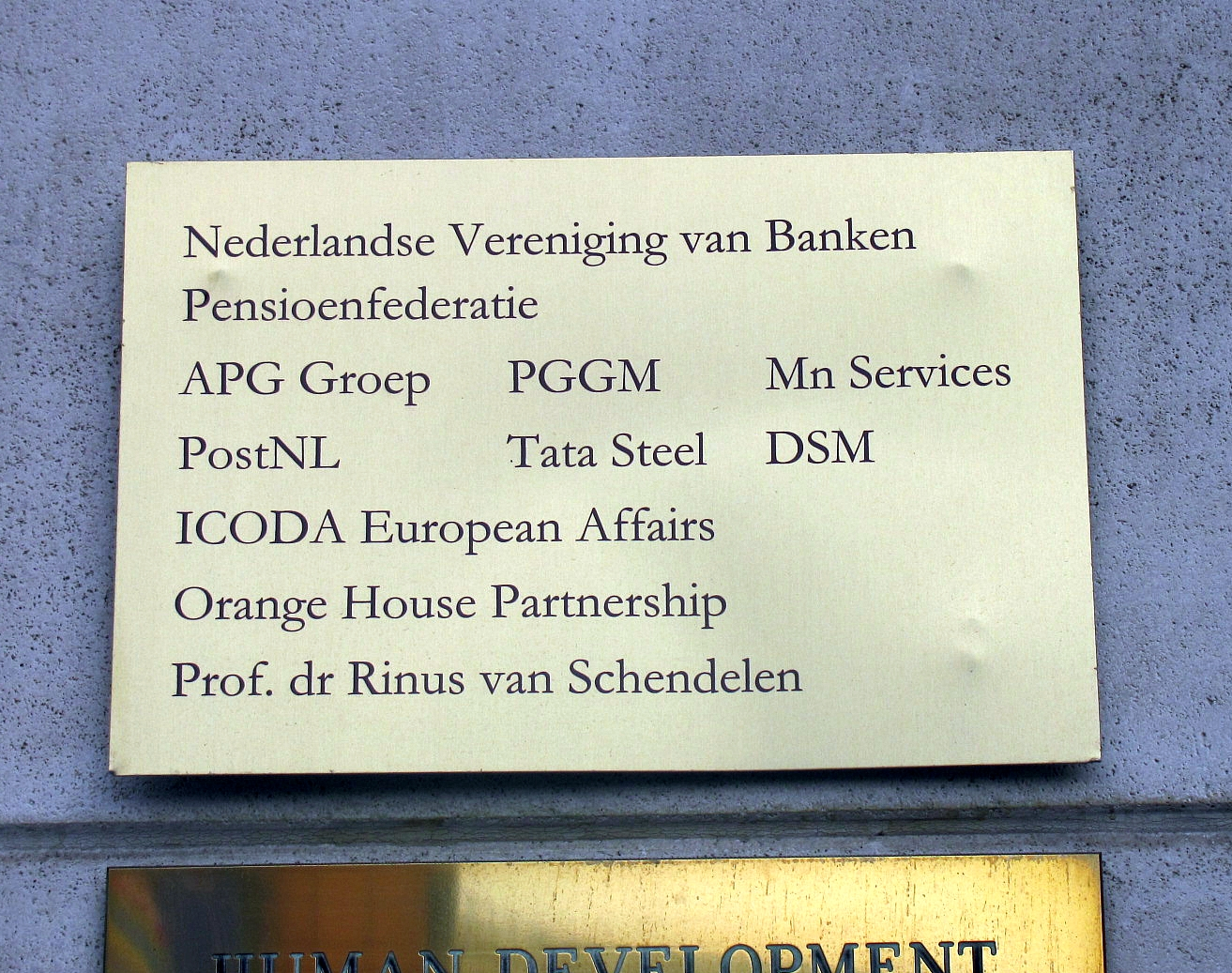
The top of a row of copper nameplates on Schumanplein. In the heart of the Brussels lobby world, where several thousands of EU lobbyists operate, Dutch companies, non-profit organisations, pension insurers, consultants and banking organisations have rented an office space from which they undertake their lobbying activities.

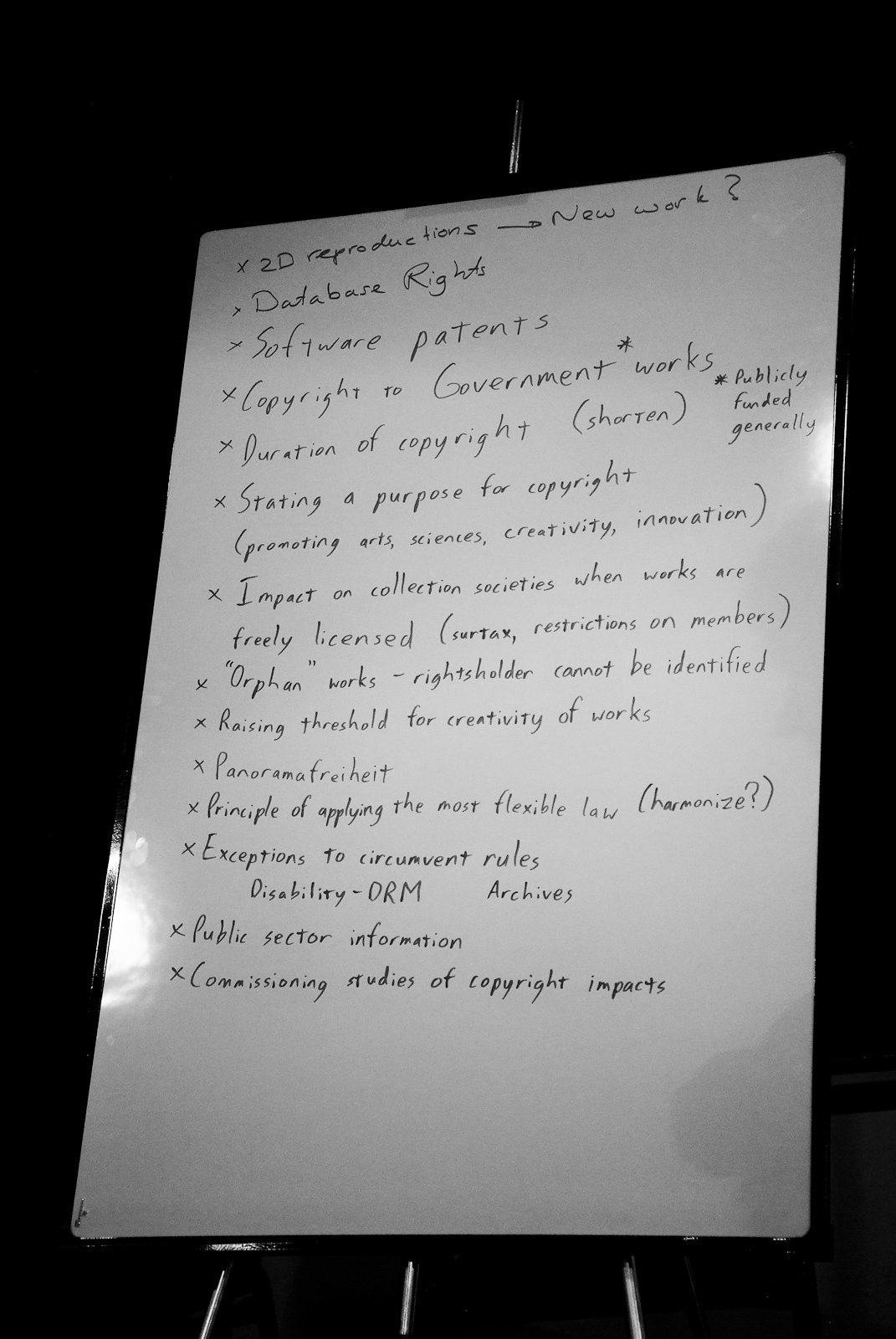
Wikimania 2009, results of the discussion about possible contents of European lobbying

Lobbying in the European Union, also referred to officially as European interest representation, is the activity of representatives of diverse interest groups or lobbies who attempt to influence the executive and legislative authorities of the European Union through public relations, government relations or public affairs work. The Treaty of Lisbon introduced a new dimension of lobbying at the European level that is different from most national lobbying. At the national level, lobbying is more a matter of personal and informal relations between the officials of national authorities, but lobbying at the European Union level is increasingly a part of the political decision-making process and thus part of the legislative process. 'European interest representation' is part of a new participatory democracy within the European Union. The first step towards specialised regulation of lobbying in the European Union was a Written Question tabled by Alman Metten, in 1989. In 1991, Marc Galle, Chairman of the Committee on the Rules of Procedure, the Verification of Credentials and Immunities, was appointed to submit proposals for a Code of conduct and a register of lobbyists. Today lobbying in the European Union is an integral and important part of decision-making in the EU.

== Basics ==
=== Definition ===
The European Commission published an official definition of interest representation at European level in a communication from the Commission of 21 March 2007 (which was a follow-up to the green paper of 3 May 2006); the definition, taken from the green paper, defined lobbying as "all activities carried out with the objective of influencing the policy formulation and decision-making processes of the European institutions".

Interest representation, or lobbying, is either a part of the work of institutions with a different main focus or it is the main focus of organisations whose 'raison-d'être' is lobbying itself. The main actors in European interest representation are national, European, and international associations from all sectors of economic and social life, private enterprise, law firms, public affairs consultants (political consultants) and non-governmental organisations and think tanks.

There are two types of European interest representation:

- action taken by interest representatives (lobbyists) at the European level in Brussels (the "Brussels Route")
- action taken by interest representatives, associations and companies at the national level, focusing on European issues (the "national route")

=== Characteristics of European-level interest representation ===
The decision-making and legislative processes of the European Union increasingly involve cooperation between the EU institutions and the informal work of interest representatives.

European interest representation differs in a number of ways from national interest representation:

- it is transnational
- it directly affects the work of EU institutions
- influencing policy and decision-making is a recognised activity
- it takes place within the framework of the European Transparency Initiative
- interest groups take part in the policy-making process at an early stage: the Commission invites associations to express their views and carries out extensive consultation early on in every legislative procedure. Before formulating a draft directive, a so-called 'green paper' or 'white paper' is released, as a basis for comprehensive consultation.

== The legal basis: Article 11 of the Treaty on European Union ==
When the Treaty of Lisbon came into force on 1 December 2009, it provided a legal framework for interest representation in the form of Article 11 of the Treaty on European Union. This article regulates the details of participative democracy within the EU in the following sections: horizontal civil dialogue (Article 11(1) TEU), vertical civil dialogue (Article 11(2) TEU), the Commission's existing consultation practices (Article 11(3) TEU), and the new European Citizens' Initiative (Article 11(4) TEU).

=== Implementation of Article 11 TEU in EU institutions ===
Interest representation is prescribed by law and is thus binding on the EU institutions. In order of implementing Article 11 TEU, the Institutions themselves had to take specific measures.

==== Implementation of Article 11(1) and 11(2): horizontal and vertical civil dialogue ====
'1. The institutions shall, by appropriate means, give citizens and representative associations the opportunity to make known and publicly exchange their views in all areas of Union action.'

'2. The institutions shall maintain an open, transparent and regular dialogue with representative associations and civil society.'

As a result of the civil dialogue objectives, various actions have been initiated to realise improvements, for example:

- The 'Europe for Citizens' programme: established from 1 January 2014 until 31 December 2020, this programme has the objective of contributing to citizens' understanding of the European Union and its history and diversity. It is also intended to improve conditions for proper civic and democratic participation. The programme includes mutual learning and cooperation activities (citizens' meetings, town-twinning, remembrance projects, etc.). Europe for Citizens Contact Points, union level events (conferences, commemorations, award ceremonies, peer reviews, expert meetings and seminars) among others.
- Establishment of web sites such as 'Your Voice in Europe' by the European Commission, where citizens can find information on consultations, discuss their views in forums or blogs, or get in touch with their regional or national representatives.
- The European Parliament founded the so-called 'Agora' (as a tribute to the first public debating forum on political issues in Athens, Greece). The Agora is a forum which takes place in the European Parliament's hemicycle in Brussels. It is a programme designed to enable citizens to take part in the policy-making process: 500 representatives of civil society organisations will be invited to discuss and debate the topic of this particular Agora for two days (e.g. the Citizens' Agora on Youth Unemployment (6–8 November 2013)). The Agora is thus an initiative to encourage vertical civil dialogue.

==== Implementation of Article 11(3): Consultation ====
'3. The European Commission shall carry out broad consultations with parties concerned in order to ensure that the Union's actions are coherent and transparent.'

As soon as the European Commission envisages a new political Initiative or a revision of already consisting legislation, in most cases a public consultation will be held in order to gather important information. Individuals, companies and organisations, who are interested in the subject or who are able to provide expertise regarding the issue, can supply valuable information on what to consider and how to formulate the legislative proposal. Their recommendations will be adapted as well as possible and then, in the course of the legislative process, send to the European Parliament and the Council of the European Union for discussion.

==== Implementation of Article 11(4): European Citizens' Initiative ====
'4. Not less than one million citizens who are nationals of a significant number of Member States may take the initiative of inviting the European Commission, within the framework of its powers, to submit any appropriate proposal on matters where citizens consider that a legal act of the Union is required for the purpose of implementing the Treaties.'

The European Commission published the procedure for implementing Article 11(4) TEU (European Citizens' Initiative) initially in a green paper (then initiated the process in November 2009). The Council of the European Union adopted the regulation on 14 February 2011. The European Citizens' Initiative (ECI) entered into force on 1 April 2012. The initiative is a strong tool for participatory democracy. It enables EU citizens to call directly to the European Commission to propose legislation of interest to them. An initiative must be supported by at least one million EU citizens from at least seven different EU member states. The legislative proposal must also be within the institutional competence of the EU bodies. Since its implementation in 2012, nearly 6 million citizens have made use of the ECI. So far, 24 ECIs have been registered, 19 ECIs were declared inadmissible and 3 successful ECIs have reached out to more than 1 million supporters.

== Development and strategies of European Interest Representation ==
=== European Transparency Initiative ===
In the context of the European Transparency Initiative, which was introduced in 2005 by EU Commissioner Siim Kallas, the European Commission introduced a voluntary register of lobbyists in the European Union on 23 June 2008. The Transparency Register of both the European Parliament and the EU Commission was established three years later, on 23 June 2011. Registration is not mandatory, but is a precondition to accreditation and physical access to buildings of the European Parliament. The objective of the joint transparency register is to increase transparency of the EU lobbying system by enabling public inspection of the lobbying process itself, including an insight on who the lobbyists are, that try to shape EU governance, and whose interests they represent. Organisations as well as private actors and individuals can register in one of the six broadly composed categories of the Transparency Register. These include law firms, trade and professional associations, non-governmental-organisations (NGOs) and organisations which represent interests of local, regional or communal authorities and other public institutions. Moreover, during the process of registration the applicant must provide certain information which is published on the website of the Transparency Register by the European Union. These include the main office, the aim, mission and interests, memberships, clients and an estimate of financial resources including received EU funding. By registering, applicants agree to a unitary code of conduct.

=== The European Parliament ===
On 31 January 2019, the EU Parliament adopted binding rules on lobby transparency. Amending its Rules of Procedure, the Parliament stipulated that MEPs involved in drafting and negotiating legislation must publish online their meetings with lobbyists. The amendment says that 'rapporteurs, shadow rapporteurs or committee chairs shall, for each report, publish online all scheduled meetings with interest representatives falling under the scope of the Transparency Register'-database of the EU.

=== Dual interest representation: national and European level ===
Connection between the local and the European level of interest representation are managed not only through the institutions of the state but also through local and national organisations.

== Types of EU Legislation ==
There are different types of EU law, each with distinct characteristics and effects. Regulations are comparable to national laws, having binding power and direct applicability across all EU member states. Directives, on the other hand, are addressed to Member States with the intention of aligning national legislation, requiring further implementation at the national level. Decisions are individual measures addressed to specific recipients, instructing them to take or refrain from certain actions. Recommendations, opinions, or communications serve to publicize the views of EU institutions without imposing legal obligations on the concerned parties.

The EU lobbyist Andreas Geiger claims that the understanding and usage of these different legislative act is fundamental for EU lobbyists and stakeholders. In particular, regulations and directives for legislative lobbying and decisions of the Commission for administrative lobbying related to competition law are pivotal.

One of the most significant changes brought about by the Lisbon Treaty is the increased power of the Parliament during the legislative process. This has made the ordinary legislative procedure (previously known as the co-decision procedure) the standard mechanism for EU policy-making. Article 294 TFEU outlines the ordinary legislative procedure, now the most crucial tool in Union policy decision-making.
