= James Zogby =

Founder of the Arab American Institute

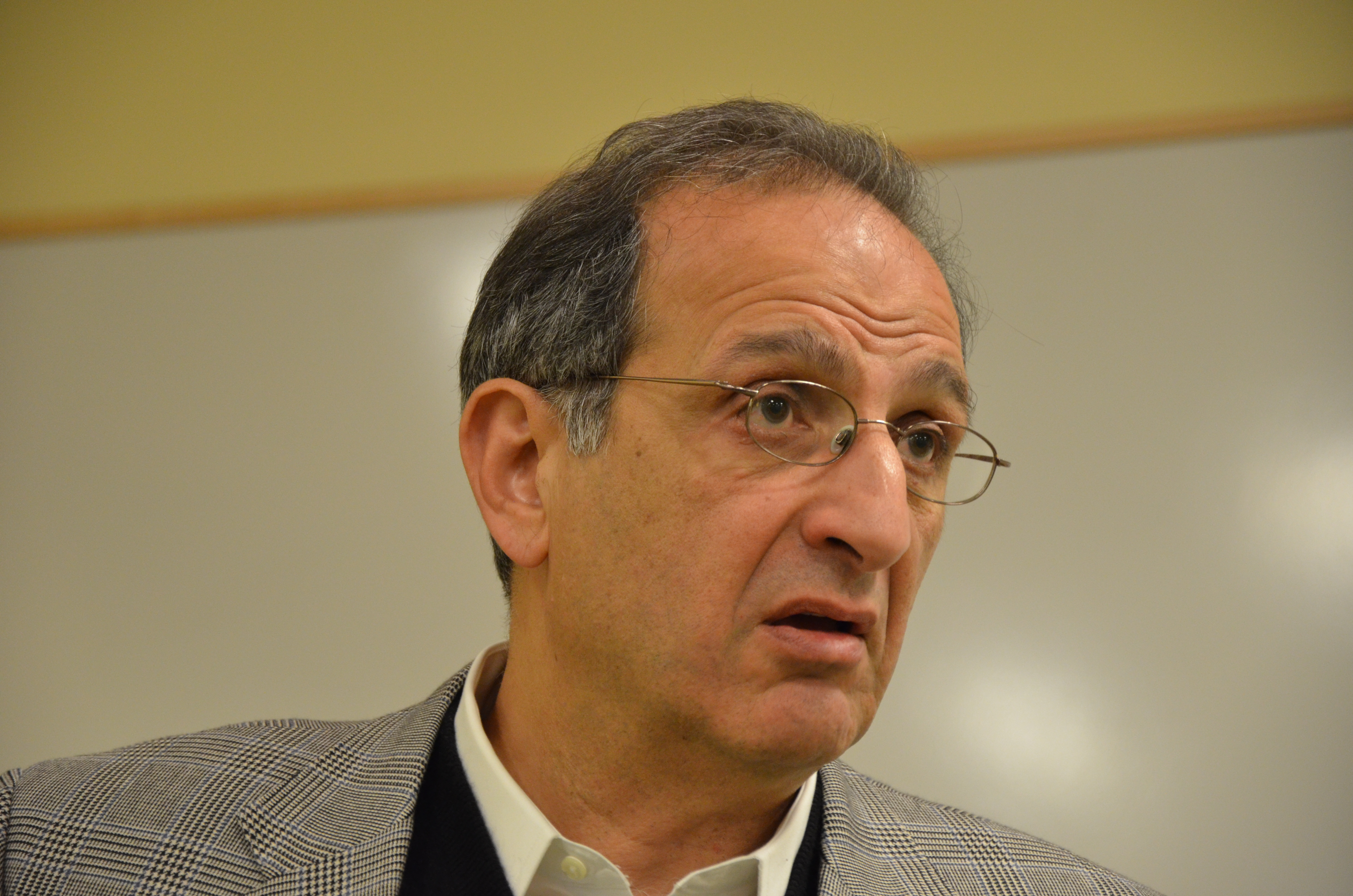
- Born: James Joseph Zogby; 1945 (age 80–81); Utica, New York, U.S.
- Education: Le Moyne College (BA); Temple University (MA, PhD)
- Political party: Democratic
- Spouse: Eileen McMahon
- Children: 5
- Relatives: John Zogby (brother)
- Website: Official website

James Joseph Zogby (from Arabic: زغبي, Zuġbīy) (born 1945) is the founder and president of the Arab American Institute, a Washington, D.C.–based organization that serves as a political and policy research arm of the Arab-American community.

Zogby is Managing Director of Zogby Research Services, LLC, specializing in research and communications and undertaking polling across the Arab world. In September 2013 President Barack Obama appointed Zogby to the United States Commission on International Religious Freedom. Zogby is a lecturer and scholar on Middle East issues and a Visiting Professor of Social Research and Public Policy at New York University Abu Dhabi. From 2001 to 2017, he was a member of the Executive Committee of the Democratic National Committee.

== Early years and education ==
Zogby's father, Joseph, illegally immigrated from Lebanon to the United States in 1922. He eventually obtained citizenship through a government policy of amnesty and worked as a grocer. He married Celia Ann, a teacher, also born with the surname "Zogby"; they lived in Utica, New York, where their children were born. Zogby, like his parents, is Catholic.

He attended Le Moyne College in Syracuse, New York, graduating in 1967 with a bachelor's degree in economics. A student of Ismail al-Faruqi, he went on to earn his Ph.D. in Islamic studies from Temple University in 1975. He studied at Princeton University in 1976 as a National Endowment for the Humanities post-doctoral fellow.

== Career ==
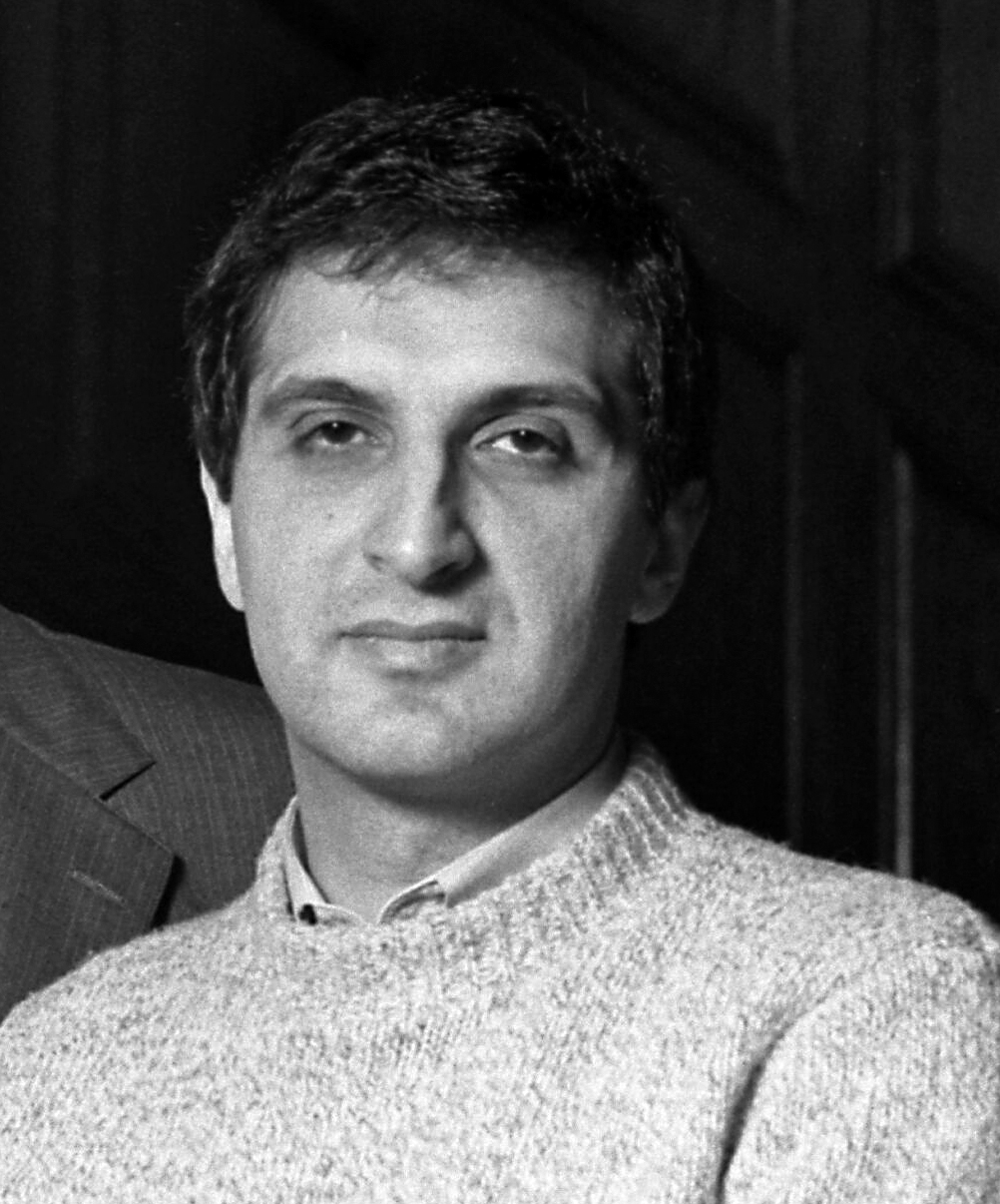
Zogby in 1986

During the late 1970s Zogby was a founding member and leader of the Palestine Human Rights Campaign. In 1980 he co-founded the American-Arab Anti-Discrimination Committee with former U.S. Senator James Abourezk and served as executive director until 1984. In 1982, while at ADC, Zogby helped create Save Lebanon, Inc., a private, nonprofit, non-sectarian humanitarian relief organization to fund social welfare projects in Lebanon and health care for Palestinian and Lebanese victims of war. In March 1985 Zogby founded the Arab American Institute, of which he is still president.

In 1993 Vice President Al Gore tapped Zogby to help lead Builders for Peace after the signing of the Israeli–Palestinian peace accord in Washington. As co-president of Builders, Zogby promoted business investment by Arab-Americans in the West Bank and Gaza Strip. As co-president of Builders, Zogby frequently traveled to the Middle East with delegations led by Gore and Secretary of Commerce Ron Brown. In 1994 he led a U.S. delegation to the signing of the agreement in Cairo, Egypt, along with the Builders co-president, former U.S. Congressman Mel Levine. Zogby also chaired a forum on the Palestinian economy at the Casablanca Economic Summit. After 1994, through Builders, Zogby worked with a number of U.S. Agencies to promote and support Palestinian economic development including AID, OPIC, USTDA, and the Departments of State and Commerce.

Since 1992 Zogby has written Washington Watch, a weekly column on American politics for major Arab newspapers, which is published in 14 Arab and South Asian countries. He has written several books, including What Ethnic Americans Really Think (The Zogby Culture Polls) and What Arabs Think: Values, Beliefs and Concerns. He also blogs at The Huffington Post and is a member of Politico's Arena. Zogby hosted a weekly interview and call-in discussion program, Viewpoint with James Zogby, about Middle East and world issues on Abu Dhabi Television, which was broadcast in America on Link TV, DirecTV and Dish Network. The show won an award at the Cairo Radio/Television Festival.

In 1984 and 1988 Zogby served as deputy campaign manager and senior advisor to Jesse Jackson's presidential campaigns. In 1995 he was appointed as co-convener of the National Democratic Ethnic Coordinating Committee (NDECC), an umbrella organization within the Democratic Party of leaders of European and Mediterranean descent, to which he was reelected in 1999 and 2001. Also in 2001 he was appointed to the Executive Committee of the Democratic National Committee (DNC), and in 2006 he was named co-chair of the DNC's Resolutions Committee. He served as Gore's Senior Advisor on Ethnic Outreach, a post he also held in the 2008 Obama campaign.

As an author and scholar on Middle East issues and the Arab-American community, Zogby has been invited to testify before a number of Congressional Committees and Executive branch forums, including on the subject of Arab attitudes toward the United States. He has been a guest speaker in the Secretary's Open Forum at the U.S. Department of State. Zogby has also addressed the United Nations and other international forums. He is a member of the Council on Foreign Relations. President Obama appointed Zogby to the U.S. Commission on International Religious Freedom in 2013 and reappointed him to a second term in 2015.

In November 2024, Zogby announced his decision to run for the DNC Vice Chair position.

== Victim of harassment ==
Zogby has been the target of repeated anti-Arab threats, for which at least three men have been convicted and sent to prison. In 1980 Zogby's office in Washington, D.C. was fire-bombed by terrorists in the Jewish Defense League. In July 2006, during the 2006 Lebanon War, Zogby and other senior Arab American Institute employees were threatened in emails and voice mail messages from Patrick Syring, a career Foreign Service Officer of the U.S. State Department. Syring accused Zogby and the Arab American Institute of being part of Hezbollah, and Zogby of being an anti-Semite. Syring said, "The only good Lebanese is a dead Lebanese. The only good Arab is a dead Arab." In one email, Syring wrote, "You wicked evil Hezbollah-supporting Arabs should burn in the fires of hell for eternity and beyond. The United States would be safer without you.". In a March 2008 email to a television station that had aired an interview with Zogby, Syring accused Zogby and the Arab American Institute of "promoting the interests of Hezbollah, Hamas and Arab terror". Syring was sentenced on July 11, 2008, to one year in prison for civil rights violations. He was released early on January 30, 2009.

== Awards and honors ==
Le Moyne College awarded Zogby an honorary doctor of laws degree in 1995 and in 1997 named him the college's outstanding alumnus. In 2007 Temple University College of Liberal Arts also singled out Zogby as an outstanding alumnus. In 2008 American University of Cairo awarded him an honorary doctorate. Zogby was also named an Honorary Patron of the University Philosophical Society, Trinity College, Dublin.

== Books ==
- Arab Voices: What They Are Saying to Us, and Why it Matters, James Zogby, Palgrave Macmillan (October 2010), ISBN 978-0230102996
