= International Sustainable Energy Organization =

The objective of the International Sustainable Energy Organization for Renewable Energy and Energy Efficiency (ISEO) with headquarters in Geneva is to accelerate and enlarge the worldwide contribution of clean, sustainable energy to economic and equitable social development. Gustav R. Grob founded ISEO for the United Nations.

It held its first meeting in 2002, in Geneva.

It has three main missions:

1. to identify and end government subsidies for non-sustainable energy sources;
2. to fund developing nations to build more sustainable energy infrastructure; and
3. to spread information about sustainable energy production.

== Sectors ==
- Architecture - Willi Weber
- Bioenergy - R Sims, M Sumenjak
- Clean fuels - Armin Reller
- Co-generation / Heat Pumps - S. Minett
- Economy - Darja Piciga
- Education / Training - J. Corominas
- Efficiency - Rolf Wahnschafft
- Energy policy - G. R. Grob
- Financing - Arik Schweiger
- Geothermal energy - Ritesh Arya
- Hydropower - Dogan Altinbilek
- Legal - Adrian Bradbrook
- Muscle energy / Food & Feed - Steivan Defilla
- Ocean energy - Les Duckers
- Solar energy (PV) - Wilhelm Durisch
- Solar thermal energy - Andreas Luzzi
- Statistics & Forecasting - G.R. Grob
- Transport - Rolf Schatzmann
- Wild energy - Maen Kaedan

== See also ==
- Energy law
