= Operation Endgame =

2003–2012 American immigration enforcement plan

Operation Endgame was a 2003–2012 plan under implementation by the Office of Detention and Removal Operations of the United States Department of Homeland Security Bureau of Immigration and Customs Enforcement to detain and deport all removable aliens and "suspected terrorists" currently living in the United States by 2012.

== Overview ==
The objectives of the plan are described in a memorandum from the director Anthony S. Tangemann to the Deputy Assistant Director of Field Operations dated June 27, 2003:

The DRO provides the endgame to immigration enforcement and that is the removal of all removable aliens. This is also the essence of our mission statement and the 'golden measure' to our successes.

A document issued by the Office of Detention and Removal Operations titled "Strategic Plan, 2003–2012 Detention and Removal Strategy for a Secure Homeland "describes Operation Endgame as follows:

Endgame is the Immigration and Customs Enforcement (ICE), Office of Detention and Removal (DRO) multi-year strategic enforcement plan. It stresses the effective and efficient execution of the critical service DRO provides its partners and stakeholders to enforce the nation's immigration and naturalization laws. The DRO strategic plan sets in motion a cohesive enforcement program with a ten-year time horizon that will build the capacity to "remove all removable aliens," eliminate the backlog of unexecuted final order removal cases, and realize its vision.

== See also ==
- Illegal immigration to the United States
- Operation Metro Surge
- Operation Midway Blitz
- Undocumented immigrant population of the United States
