= Libya lobby in the United States =

The Libya lobby in the United States is a collection of lawyers, public relation firms and professional lobbyists paid directly by the government of Libya to lobby the public and government of the United States on behalf of the interests of the government of Libya.

The Libyan government has engaged a number of American firms who have disclosed their work under the Foreign Agents Registration Act, including White & Case, Blank Rome, The Livingston Group, and Monitor Group. In 2008, law firm White & Case gave Libya “a special 15 percent discount off of our standard rates” in its effort to cement a “significant relationship" with the Libyan government under led by Muammar Gaddafi. In 2008 and 2009, the Gaddafi government paid over $2 million to lobbyists White and Case, Blank Rome, and The Livingston Group, led by Former Congressman Bob Livingston, to lobby on their behalf.

Monitor Group was hired in 2005 to assess the state of Libya's economy, develop plans for economic modernization and reform of the banking system, and train leaders from different sectors of society. The work did not involve any wider political reforms in the North African nation. According to a 2007 memo from Monitor to Libya's intelligence chief which was subsequently obtained by the National Conference for the Libyan Opposition and posted on the internet in 2009, Monitor entered into further contracts with the Libyan regime in 2006 which were worth at least $3m (£1.8m) per year plus expenses. According to the memo these contracts were for a campaign to "enhance international understanding and appreciation of Libya... emphasize the emergence of the new Libya... [and] introduce Muammar Qadhafi as a thinker and intellectual." Monitor's work became the subject of controversy with the onset of the Libyan Civil War. In March 2011 Monitor announced that it had launched an internal investigation into its work for the Libyan government and in May 2011 registered past work in Libya.
