= Society of European Affairs Professionals =

Federation of lobbies

The Society of European Affairs Professionals (SEAP) is a federation of lobbies created in 1997.
