= Patrick Syring =

American diplomat

- Born: William Patrick Syring; August 30, 1957 (age 69); Toledo, Ohio, U.S.
- Education: University of Notre Dame; Georgetown University
- Occupation: Diplomat
- Employer: United States Foreign Service United States Department of State
- Known for: Convicted of civil rights violations

William Patrick Syring (born 30 August 1957, in Toledo, Ohio) is an American former career diplomat who was twice convicted of threatening and violating the civil rights of James Zogby and other employees of the Arab American Institute. The first threats took place during the 2006 Lebanon War. Syring pleaded guilty and was sentenced to one year in prison 11 July 2008, and was released early, in January 2009. Syring was again indicted by a federal grand jury in the District of Columbia on very similar offenses on February 21, 2018, and was ultimately sentenced to 60 months in prison. Syring was released early in June 2022 under the First Step Act.

== Background ==
Syring was born into a large Catholic family in Toledo, Ohio, and graduated from the University of Notre Dame in 1979 and the Walsh School of Foreign Service at Georgetown University in 1981. He is gay. Syring was nominated for appointment as a Foreign Service Officer, Class 2, in March 1982. He was assigned as a consular/commercial officer at the U.S. Embassy in Paramaribo, Suriname, succeeding Cornelis M. Keur, and served there under Ambassador Robert W. Duemling into at least 1984. He later served as an economic/commercial officer at the U.S. Embassy in Conakry, Guinea, in 1987, and was subsequently posted to Rio de Janeiro, Brazil, before transferring in 1992 to the Office of Aviation Negotiations in the Bureau of Economic and Business Affairs in Washington, where he worked on U.S. civil aviation agreements, including 1993 consultations with Germany. From 1993 to 2002 or 2003 (official records vary) Syring served as a consular/commercial officer in Beirut, Lebanon, Buenos Aires, Argentina, and Frankfurt, Germany. After the 9/11 attacks, he began circling "country of birth" and writing the letter "T" on visa applications from people of Middle Eastern descent. Two applications were returned by mail with the word "terrorist" written on the envelope. When confronted, he told a supervisor that "applicants supported terrorism solely by virtue of the fact that they were citizens of certain countries." He also began sending trolling emails from his personal account. He finally accepted "voluntarily curtailment," ending his consular career. He was posted to the Bureau of Economic and Business Affairs, Office of Economic Policy Analysis at the United States Department of State.

Syring retired from the State Department in July 2007. Syring's retirement concluded a career of nearly 26 years at the State Department.

== Indictment ==
Syring sent three voice mails and four emails to the Arab American Institute in July 2006, during the 2006 Lebanon War. A Federal Grand Jury in the District of Columbia returned an indictment on August 15, 2007, charging Syring with violation of Title 18 of the United States Code, Section 875(c), threatening messages in interstate commerce to injure an individual, and violation of Title 18 of the United States Code Section 245(b)(2)(C), by threat of force, to interfere with the civil rights of the founder and employees of the Arab American Institute.

Syring identified himself in the voice mails and emails he left at the headquarters of the Arab American Institute on July 17, 2006. From July 17, 2006, to July 29, 2006, Syring sent seven email and voice mail messages to the Arab American Institute headquarters offices from his home in suburban Virginia. The indictment claims Syring "did willfully intimidate and interfere with Arab American Institute employees because of their race and national origin", and "threatened to injure Arab American Institute employees".

Asked about Syring, State Department spokesman Sean McCormack said on August 16, 2007, "Let me just underline the seriousness with which the Secretary approaches the idea that the State Department should be a workplace that in no way, shape or form, tolerates discrimination or hateful language or any other action that would violate federal laws or regulations. It is just not condoned or acceptable in this department."

On August 16, 2007, the Arab American Institute issued a statement that said "The threats were both intimidating and frightening – and the fact that the defendant was a 20 year career officer at the Department of State made it of even greater concern."

== Disposition ==
Syring pleaded not guilty on August 30, 2007, in the United States District Court for the District of Columbia. On November 19, 2007, United States District Judge Colleen Kollar-Kotelly denied a motion from Syring to dismiss the charges against him, ensuring that the case would go to trial. "Whether [the] Defendant's communications constituted a true threat," Kollar-Kotelly wrote, "is an issue properly left to the jury." In the memorandum opinion November 19, 2007, the judge added "the Court agrees with Defendant, that on its face the Indictment does not present a compelling case. Nevertheless, even based on the meager context alleged in the Indictment, it is possible a reasonable jury could interpret Defendant's communications as 'a serious expression of an intent to commit an act of unlawful violence to a particular individual or group of individuals'." In an order filed December 14, 2007, Syring's trial was tentatively rescheduled to begin February 11, 2008, but was subsequently rescheduled.

On March 13, 2008, Syring sent an e-mail to a U.S. television network where Zogby had been interviewed, repeating some of the language of his earlier messages. This e-mail prompted the Assistant United States Attorney for Civil Rights to withdraw a conditional plea offer of no prison time. Also, on March 20, 2008, United States District Judge Colleen Kollar-Kotelly revoked Syring's pre-trial release; Syring was incarcerated for 111 days in the District of Columbia Department of Corrections prior to Syring's sentencing on July 11, 2008.

Syring pleaded guilty to federal civil rights charges on June 12, 2008, was sentenced on July 11, 2008, to one year in prison, but was released from prison early in January 2009. His sentence included a fine of US$10,000, paid in July 2008, three years post-release supervision, completed on January 27, 2012, and 100 hours community service completed in April 2009.

== Release and second indictment ==
Following his release and the completion of a three-year probationary period, Syring again began to send intimidating emails to staffers of the Arab American Institute and other targets, mostly affiliated with the AAI, although he avoided using the threats of violence which had resulted in the original criminal charges. Especially following the 2016 Pulse nightclub shooting, emails increased. On May 30, 2017, Syring began sending violent threats to the AAI again, advocating for the "cleansing" of "Arab American monsters" and eventually repeating the threats that had resulted in his 2008 sentencing. Syring's threats caused Zogby and other employees at the AAI to worry that Syring would target the institute in a mass shooting.

A grand jury recommended conviction, and in 2019, Syring was again convicted on 14 counts, including federal hate crime charges, and sentenced to 60 months in prison. He had sent over 700 emails to AAI staffers between 2012 and 2017. He was released from prison on June 5, 2022.
