= Environmental policy of the Trump administration =

Environmental policy of the Trump administration may refer to:

- Environmental policy of the first Trump administration
- Environmental policy of the second Trump administration
