= U.S.–Israel Joint Economic Development Group =

The U.S.–Israel Joint Economic Development Group (JEDG) is the annual bilateral meeting between Israel and the United States meant to discuss economic conditions in both countries and possible economic reforms that could be taken by the Government of Israel. In fact the JEDG is another important pillar in strengthening even more the strategic cooperation between Israel and the United States and is important to the Israeli economy. Since 2003, fiscal and other economic conditions for the $9 billion U.S.-Israel Loan Guarantee Commitment Agreement (LGCA) have been signed by the U.S. Department of State and U.S. Department of the Treasury and the Israeli Ministry of Finance at the JEDG. The last JEDG took place on June 29, 2009, in Washington, D.C. The last Mid-Year Review of the U.S.-Israel loan guarantee agreement took place on December 15, 2009.
