= List of newspapers in Israel =

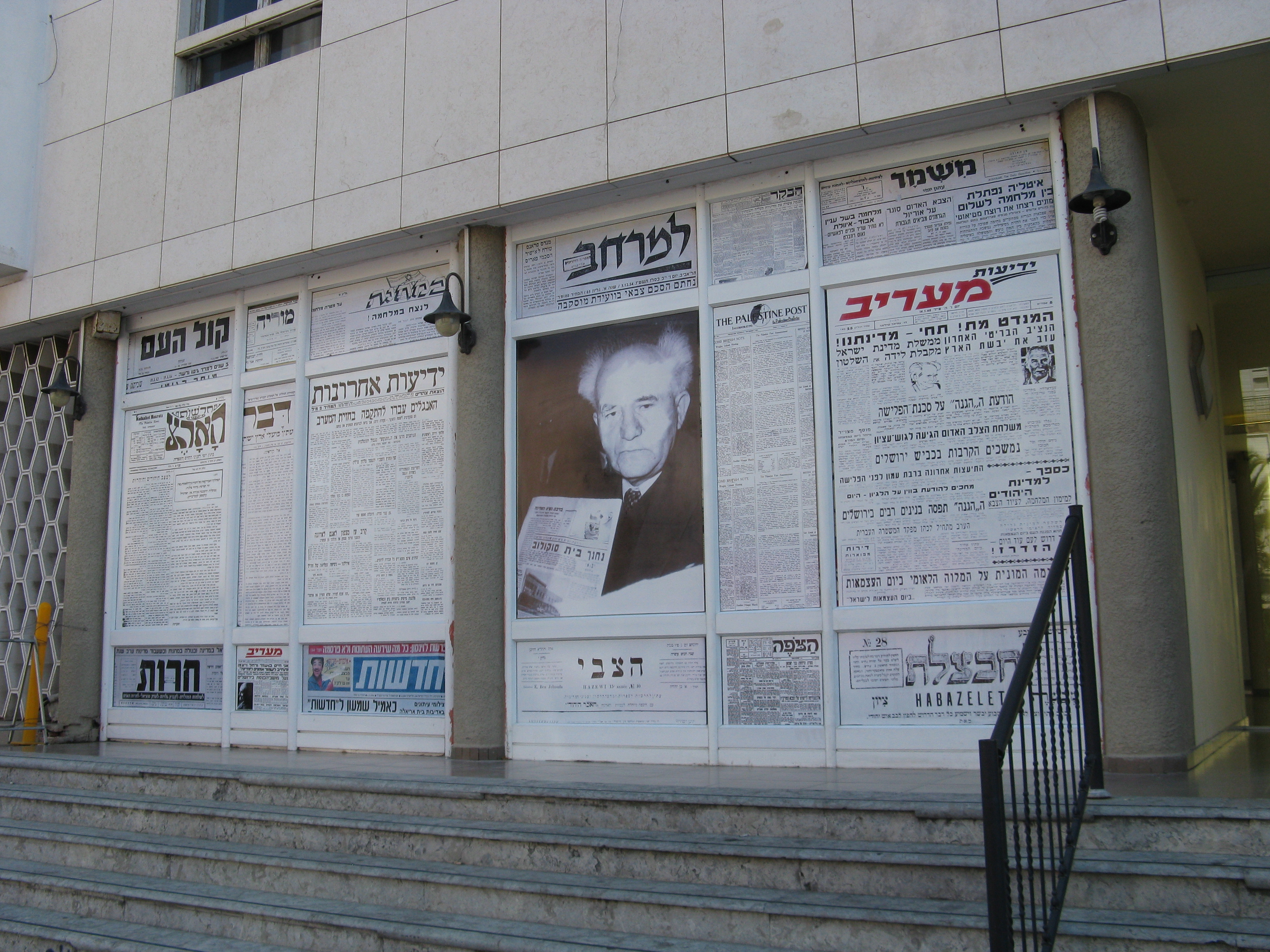
Entrance of Beit Sokolov, house of the Israeli Journalists Association

This list of newspapers in Israel is a list of newspapers printed and distributed in the State of Israel. Most are published in Hebrew, but there are also newspapers catering to Arabic speakers, and newspapers catering to immigrants speaking a variety of other languages, such as Russian, English and French.

As of 31 July 2023, a TGI survey indicated that Israel Hayom, distributed for free, is Israel's most read newspaper, with a 29.4% weekday readership exposure, followed by Yedioth Ahronoth, with 22.3%, Haaretz with 4.8%, Globes with 4% and Maariv with 3.9%.

== National newspapers ==
Name	Translation	Language(s)	Frequency	Popularity (Jan-Dec 2023)	Founded	Owner	Audience	Logo
B'Sheva	At Seven	Hebrew	Weekly	5.4% (▼1.2%)	2002	Arutz Sheva	Religious Zionists	
Calcalist	Economist	Hebrew	Daily	11.3% (▲0.8%)	2008	Yedioth Ahronoth Group	Business journalism	
Courier		Russian	Daily		1991	Israel Libo Feigin	Russians in Israel	
Globes		Hebrew, English	Daily	3.0% (▼0.7%)	1983	Fishman Group	Business journalism	
Haaretz	The Land	Hebrew, English	Daily	4.8% (▼0.4%)	1919	Haaretz Group	Left-wing Israelis	
Hamodia	The Informer	Hebrew, English, French	Daily		1950	World Agudath Israel	Haredi Jews	
Israel Hayom	Israel Today	Hebrew (website also in English)	Daily	26.6% (▼1.7%)	2007	Sheldon Adelson	conservative Israelis	
Al-Ittihad	The Union	Arabic	Daily		1944	Maki	Arab citizens of Israel	
The Jerusalem Post		English, French	Daily		1932	Eli Azur	English speakers	
All Israel News		English, French, German, Spanish, Portuguese, Russian, Korean, Chinese	Daily		2020	Near East Media	Pro-Israel, Zionist Evangelicals, Jews	
Kul al-Arab	All Arabs	Arabic	Weekly		1987	Al-Arab Group	Arab citizens of Israel	
Maariv	Evening	Hebrew	Daily	11.8% (▼3.0%)	1948	Eli Azur	Centrist Israelis	
Al-Madina	The City	Arabic	Weekly		2004	Rana Asali	Arab citizens of Israel	
Makor Rishon	Primary Source	Hebrew	Weekly	4.1% (▲0.2%)	1997	Sheldon Adelson	Religious Zionists	
Novosti Nedeli	Weekly News	Russian	Weekly		1989	Eli Azur	Russians in Israel	
TheMarker		Hebrew	Daily	5.5% (▲0.3%)	2008	Haaretz Group	Business news	
Yated Ne'eman	Reliable Basis	Hebrew	Daily		1985	Degel HaTorah	Haredi Jews	
Yedioth Ahronoth	Latest News	Hebrew (websites also in English and Spanish)	Daily	26.4% (▼0.4%)	1939	Yedioth Ahronoth Group	Centrist Israelis	
LaIsha	For the Women	Hebrew	Weekly	7.0% (▲0.3%)	1947	Yedioth Ahronoth Group	Women	
Epoch Times Israel		Hebrew (also operating worldwide)	Monthly	1.6% (▲0.6%)	2005	The Epoch Times	Hebrew speaking Israelis	
Magazina	Magazine for the right women	Hebrew	Monthly		2014	Rina Ben-Yehuda	Women with content on fashion, beauty, health, food, and general lifestyle trends	

=== Readership ===
The following are the Israeli newspapers exposure rates according to the Target Group Index (TGI), with surveys from 2016, 2019 and 2020.

Name	Weekday % (as of 2021)
Israel Hayom	31%
Yedioth Ahronoth	23.9%
Haaretz	4.7%
Maariv	3.5%

== Local newspapers ==
Jerusalem

- Kol Ha'ir

Tel Aviv

- Ha'ir
- Zman Tel Aviv

Ashkelon

- Kan Ashkelon
- Ashkelon News
- Ashkelon Net

Beer Sheva

- B7Net
- Br7News

== Defunct newspapers ==
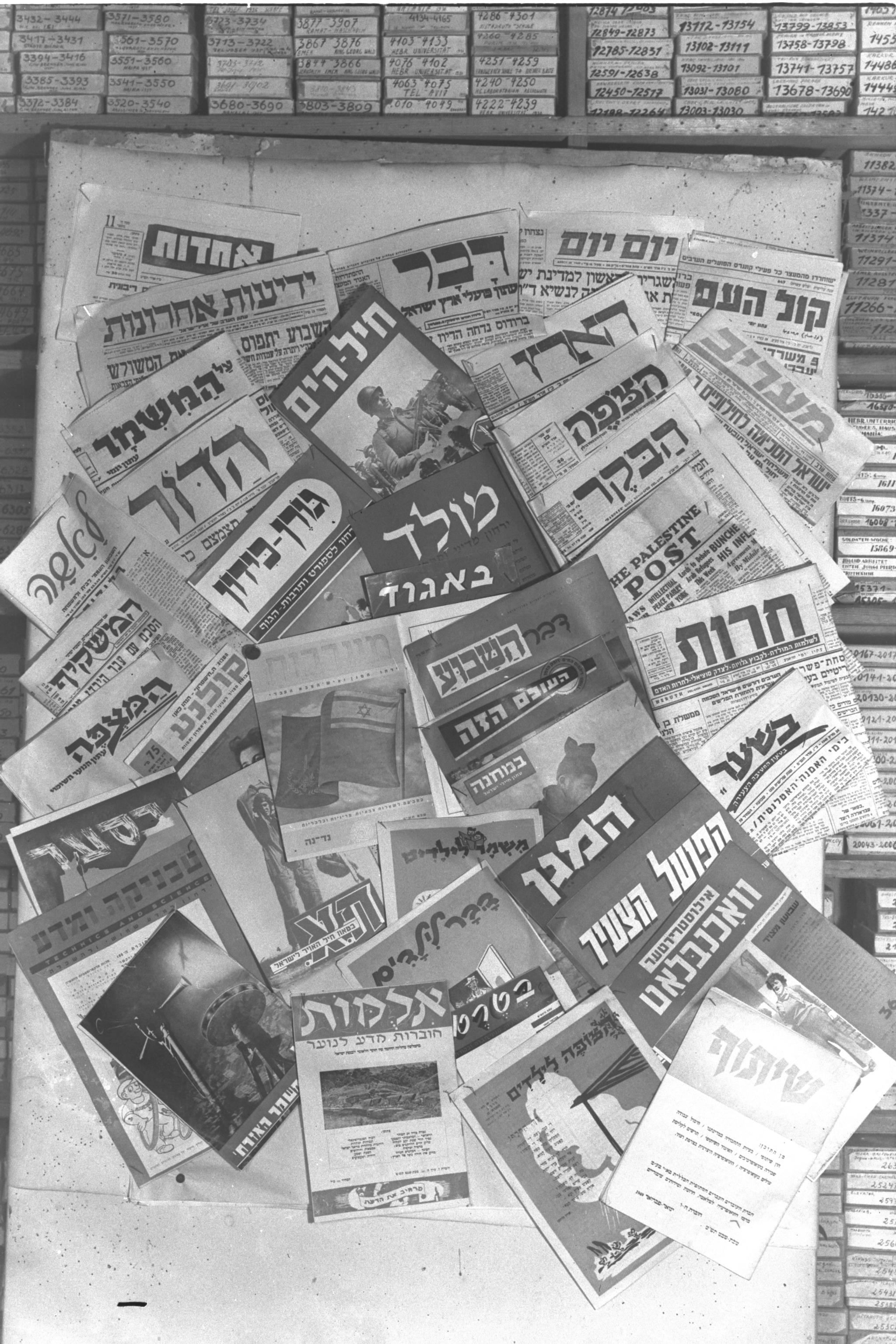
Israeli press, 1949

Party–affiliated

During the Mandate era and the first decades following independence, there were numerous newspapers owned and associated with political parties. They had mostly been discontinued by the 1970s, though a few remain, including Hamodia (Agudat Yisrael), al-Ittihad (Maki) and Yated Ne'eman (Degel HaTorah).

- HaZvi (1884–1914, Hebrew) published by Eliezer Ben-Yehuda
- Ha'or (1908–?, Hebrew), name change of HaZvi, banned by the Ottoman government.
- Al HaMishmar (1943–1995, Hebrew), associated with Hashomer Hatzair and Mapam
- Al-Watan (1983-1995, Arabic), associated with the Progressive List for Peace
- Davar (1925–1996, Hebrew), associated with the Histadrut
- Die Woch (1959–?, Yiddish), associated with Mapai
- HaBoker (1934–1965, Hebrew), associated with the General Zionists
- HaMashkif (1938–1948, Hebrew), associated with Hatzohar
- HaTzofe (1937–2008, Hebrew), associated with the National Religious Party
- HaYom (1966–1969, Hebrew), associated with Gahal
- Hazit HaAm (1931–1934, Hebrew), associated with Hatzohar
- Herut (1948–1965, Hebrew), associated with Herut
- Israel Shtime (1956–1997, Yiddish), associated with Mapam
- Kol HaAm (1937–1975, Hebrew), associated with Maki
- LaMerhav (1954–1971, Hebrew), associated with Ahdut HaAvoda
- Walka (1958–1965, Polish), associated with Maki

Independent

- Hadashot (1984–1993, Hebrew)
- Derekh HaNitzotz (folded in 1988, Hebrew)
- Israel-Nachrichten (1935–2011, German)
- Israel Post (2007–2016, Hebrew)
- Israeli (2006–2008, Hebrew)
- Sha'ar LaMathil (1956–2012, Easy Hebrew)
- Új Kelet (1948–2015, Hungarian)
- Vesti (1992–2018, Russian)

== See also ==
- Newspapers of Israel
- List of Jewish newspapers
- Media of Israel
