= Zo HaDerekh =

Israeli newspaper

- Workers of the world, unite!
- Type: Weekly newspaper
- Owner: Maki (political party)
- Founder: Meir Vilner
- Editor-in-chief: Assaf Telgam
- Founded: January 1951
- Political alignment: Communism; Marxism–Leninism
- Language: Hebrew
- City: Tel Aviv
- Country: Israel
- Price: Free
- Sister newspapers: Al-Ittihad (Israeli newspaper)
- Website: zoha.org.il

Zo HaDerekh (Hebrew: זו הדרך; lit. 'This is the way') is the Hebrew-language weekly newspaper of the Communist Party of Israel (Maki), running since January 1951. The newspaper was the initiative of Meir Vilner, a Jewish communist leader.

== History ==
=== Origin ===
Zo HaDerekh began as a theoretical idea initiated by Meir Vilner and the first papers were published between January 1951 to June 1965. At the time, It was edited by party leader and Knesset member Meir Vilner and ran until June 1965. The Arab-language sister newspaper was called Al-Darb (“The Path”).

=== Split ===
After the Communist Party of Israel split in 1965, its publications were divided between two factions. Shmuel Mikunis and Moshe Sneh faction kept the newspaper Kol HaAm, while the Rakah faction, led by Meir Vilner, Tawfik Toubi, and Emile Habibi retained newspapers Al-Ittihad, Zo HaDerekh and Al-Darb.

=== 21st century ===
Zo HaDerekh features news, commentaries and op-ed pieces from a communist perspective, and includes articles on topics such as workers’ struggles, Israel's occupation of the West Bank, feminism and antimilitarism. "The 'Zo HaDerekh' website was launched in February 2021.

Hebrew articles from Zo HaDerekh are frequently translated and reprinted abroad; for example, political sociologist Avishai Ehrlich’s analyses of Israel's wars and regional politics have appeared in French, Greek and other languages.

== Editors ==
- Meir Vilner, 1951–1984
- Tamar Gozansky, 1984–2011
- Dr. Efraim Davidi, 2011–2024
- Assaf Telgam, 2024–present

== See also ==
- Communist Party of Israel
- Al-Ittihad
- Kol HaAm
