= Kol HaAm =

- Workers of the World Unite!
- Format: Broadsheet
- Owner: Maki
- Publisher: Maki (historical political party)
- Founded: 1937
- Ceased publication: 1975
- Language: Hebrew
- Sister newspapers: Al-Ittihad (Israeli newspaper)

Kol HaAm (Hebrew: קול העם, lit. 'Voice of the People') was a Hebrew-language newspaper in Mandatory Palestine and Israel. It was initially published by the Palestine Communist Party and later by its successor, the Israeli Communist Party.

== History ==
Established in 1937, the paper appointed Communist Party member Esther Vilenska editor in 1943, and chief editor in 1947. Vilenska's second husband, Zvi Breidstein, was also an editor of the paper.

In 1953 Kol HaAm and its Arabic-language sister newspaper Al-Ittihad published a controversial article on the Korean War, which resulted in the Minister of Internal Affairs Israel Rokach, ordering the paper to close for 15 days. The papers filed a petition to the Supreme Court, which ruled that the suspension had been wrongly issued and should be set aside. The ruling utilised the Declaration of Independence in making its judgement on the issue of free speech, the first time the declaration was used as an instrument for interpretation. In doing so, the court reversed the holding in High Court Judgement 10/48 Zeev v. Gubernik that the objective of the Declaration of Independence was solely to declare the establishment of the state of Israel. In 1992, the principles of the Declaration of Independence were formally incorporated into Basic Law: Human Dignity and Liberty, granting the declaration formal constitutional status.

What became known as the "Kol HaAm Decision" also set the precedent that newspapers could only be shut down if there was a "almost certain" danger to national security.

The newspaper was not financially self-sustaining, and its funding came from donations by members and friends of the PCP. It also organized fundraising drives to finance its activities. In the 1950s, recruitment quotas were allocated to different regions of the State of Israel, and the newspaper published how each region met its quota.

=== 1965 Split ===
In 1965, following the split within Maki between the Mikunis-Sneh group, which adopted a critical approach toward the Soviet Union and Arab-nationalism, and the Vilner-Toubi group, which remained loyal to the Soviet Union and established Rakah, Kol HaAm remained under Maki's (Mikunis-Sneh group) control, while members of Rakah (later:Maki) repurposed the theoretical journal of the party into a rival newspaper titled Zo HaDerekh. After the split, Maki (Mikunus-Sneh) remained a small opposition party, and the newspaper gradually declined until the newspaper ceased publication in 1975, while the rival Zo Haderekh publishes a weekly newspaper to this day.

== Writers ==
Writers for the paper included:

- Israel Panner
- Meir Vilner
- Esther Vilenska
- Moshe Sneh
- Shmuel Mikunis
