= Esther Vilenska =

Lithuanian Jewish Israeli communist politician (1918–1975)

- אסתר וילנסקה
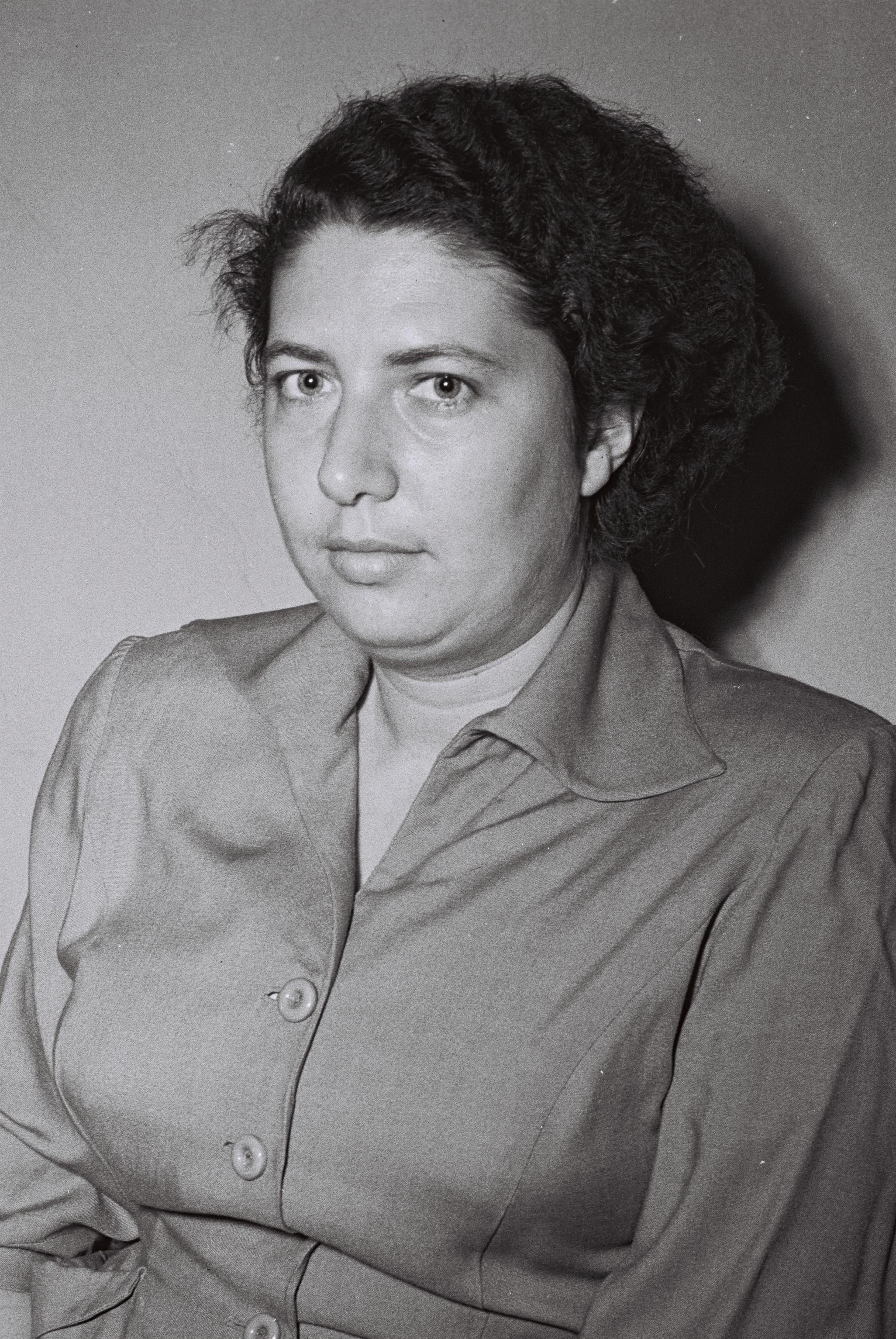
- Vilenska in 1950

Faction represented in the Knesset
- 1951–1959: Maki
- 1961–1965: Maki

Personal details
- Born: 8 June 1918 Vilnius, Kingdom of Lithuania
- Died: 8 November 1975 (aged 57) Israel
- Resting place: Southern Cemetery
- Spouse(s): Meir Vilner (divorced) Zvi Breitstein
- Children: 2
- Education: Hebrew University of Jerusalem

Esther Vilenska (Hebrew: אסתר וילנסקה; 8 June 1918 – 8 November 1975) was an Israeli communist politician, journalist and author who served as a member of the Knesset for Maki between 1951 and 1959, and then again from 1961 to 1965. She was a Lithuanian Jew from Vilnius.

== Biography ==
Born in Vilnius, Lithuania, Vilenska was active in Hashomer Hatzair in Vilnius, the city in which she attended high school, before emigrating to Mandatory Palestine in 1938. She attended the Hebrew University of Jerusalem, gaining a BA in sociology and History and an MA in History.

=== Political career ===
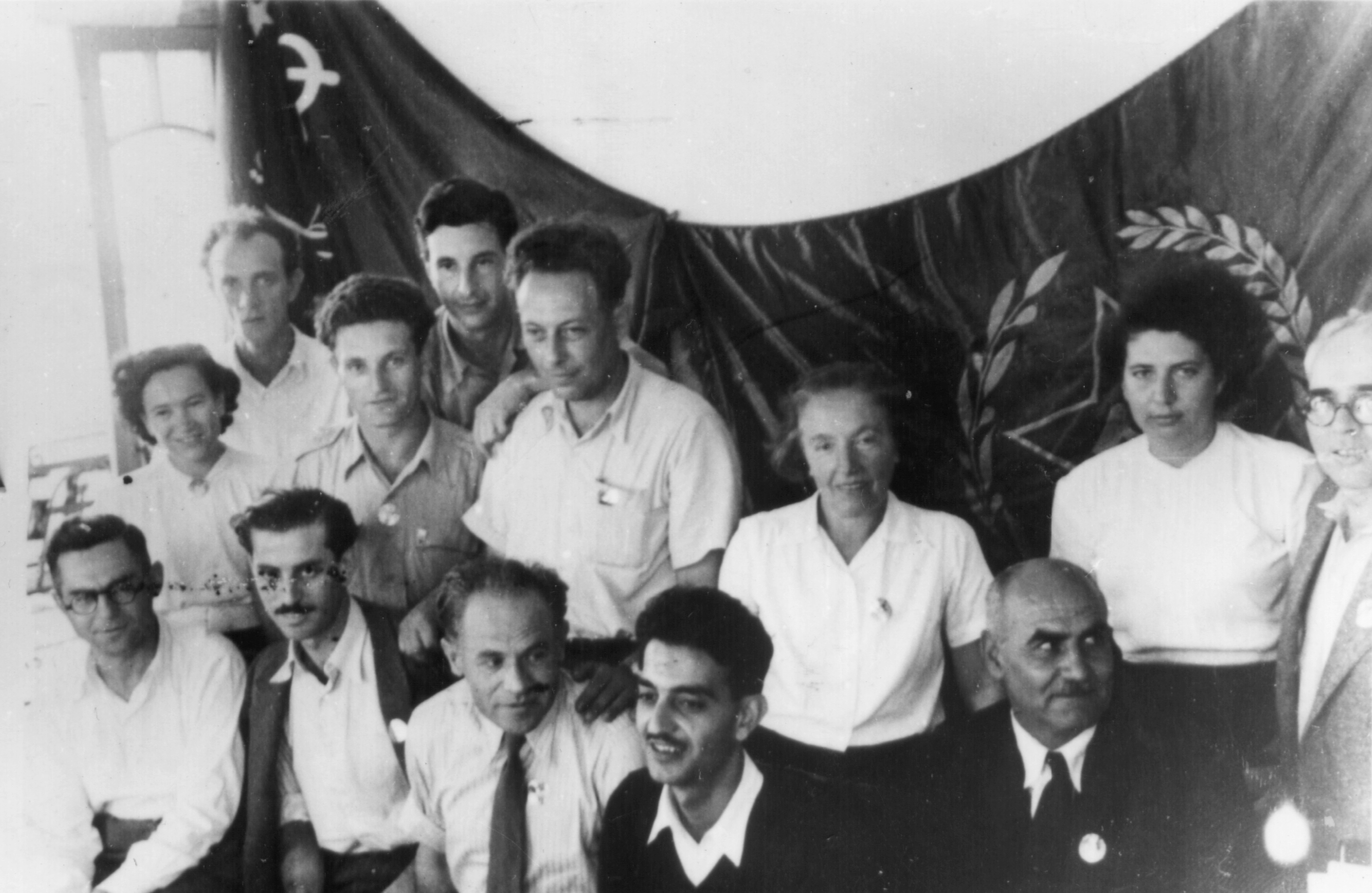
Members of the Israeli Communist Party in Haifa, 23 October 1948. Seated (L-R): Meir Vilner, Tawfik Toubi, Shmuel Mikunis, Emile Habibi, George Garabadian. Standing: Ruth Lubitsch, Eliyahu Drukman, Abraham Feigenboim, Wolf Ehrlich, Alyosha Gozansky, Pnina Feinhaus, Esther Vilenska, Mordechai Biletski.

Vilenska joined the Palestine Communist Party in 1940, and in 1943 was appointed editor of the newspaper Kol HaAm (lit. Voice of the People), becoming chief editor in 1947. In 1944, she was elected to the House of Representatives.

She joined the politbureau of Maki when it was formed upon Israeli independence in 1948, and in 1949 became a member of the executive committee of the Histadrut, a role she served in until 1973. In the same year (1949), she was elected to Tel Aviv's city council.

She was elected to the Knesset in 1951, stepping down from Tel Aviv city council. Vilenska was a member of the Knesset until 1959, and then again from 1961 until 1965. Her tenure in the Knesset was marked by vigorous defense of civil liberties and a desire to improve economic and social conditions for women.

In 1973, she left Maki and founded a new party, Aki (Hebrew: אק"י, an acronym for Opozitzia Komunistit Yisraelit (Hebrew: אופוזיציה קומוניסטית ישראלית), lit. Israeli Communist Opposition), serving as editor of its monthly paper.

=== Journalism ===
In addition to her political work, Vilenska was also a widely published writer. She was a regular contributor to leftist publications around the world, including the Saturday Morning Freiheit, a Yiddish language weekly published in New York and its English-language monthly counterpart, Jewish Life. Vilenska's articles focused on identifying trends within the Israeli left and finding solutions to the Israeli-Palestinian conflict, but often delved into cultural and international issues, such as the jailing of the African-American communist activist Angela Davis. Vilenska published numerous pamphlets and several books in Hebrew, Russian, Yiddish and English. Vilenska's labor history, Confrontation and Unity within the Labor Movement (1889–1923), was published posthumously in 1976.

=== Personal life ===
Vilenska met and married fellow Maki leader, Meir Vilner in the 1940s. They later divorced. Vilenska thereafter married Zvi Breitstein, also an editor of Kol HaAm. Vilenska and Breitstein lived in the Kiryat Shalom section of Tel Aviv and had two children. They were married until Vilenska's death in 1975.

== Selected works ==
- "The problems of class struggle in Israel" (Heb) (1949)
- "Israel's Roadmap Towards Socialism" (Heb) (1968)
- Editor: “One Hundred Years Since the Birth of Lenin” (Heb) (1970)
- “The Peasants Revolt in Germany: the Pioneer of Social Revolutions” (Heb) (1971)
- The Socialist International and the Formation of the Comintern (Heb) (1974)
- Confrontation and Unity within the Labor Movement (1889–1923) (1976)
- The National Question in Bolshevik Theory and Practice—until the Death of Lenin in 1924 (Heb) (1977)
- Values and Struggles: A Collection of Writings, Speeches and Work Law Proposals in the Knesset (1977)
- Biography: “Chapters from My Life”, Ed. Zvi Britstein (Heb) (1984)
