= Israeli Communist Opposition =

Communist organization in Israel (1973–1977)

Israeli Communist Opposition אופוזיציה קומוניסטית ישראלית
- Abbreviation: Aki (אק״י)
- Founder: Esther Vilenska
- Founded: 1973
- Dissolved: 1982
- Split from: Maki
- Merged into: Hadash
- Newspaper: Hedim (הדים, 'Echoes'); Undzer shtime (אונדזער שטימע, 'Our Voice')
- Ideology: Communism; Non-Zionism
- Political position: Far-left
- National affiliation: Hadash (1977-1982)

The Israeli Communist Opposition (Hebrew: אופוזיציה קומוניסטית ישראלית, Opozitzia Komunistit Yisra'elit), commonly known by its Hebrew acronym Aki (אק״י), was a small communist organization in Israel. The group was founded in 1973 by former Knesset member Esther Vilenska after she left Maki. (Note: Maki dissolved the same year, merging into Moked.)

Vilenska had emerged in the spring of 1972 as a leading voice against the Maki leadership, accusing it of 'right-wing deviations'. Vilenska and her followers argued that the alliance should include more radical forces, such as Uri Avnery's Meri. When Meri was not included in the alliance, Vilenska's group participated in the Meri list in the 1973 Knesset election. In the end, the Maki Central Committee expelled her and her associates from the party. Aki was formed by her followers, and was labelled a "splitting, neo-Rakahist tendency" by Maki.

Aki had a predominantly Jewish membership. The group opposed both Maki and Rakah. The organization published the monthly Hedim (הדים, 'Echoes') in Hebrew from Tel Aviv, with Vilenska as its editor between 1974 and 1975. It also issued a Yiddish publication, Undzer shtime (אונדזער שטימע, 'Our Voice').

Ahead of the elections to the 12th congress of Histadrut, Aki formed a joint list with the Blue-Red Movement and HaOlam HaZeh.

In 1975, former general secretary of Maki Shmuel Mikunis left his old party after its merger into Moked, echoing Vilenska's accusations of Maki's Zionist and right-wing deviations, and joined Aki instead. Aki held a national conference in July 1975, with around a hundred participants; Vilenska and Mikunis led the meeting. The conference elaborated a programme for the organization. Vilenska died on November 9, 1975.

Vilenska's husband, Zvi Breitstein, led Aki into Rakah's new coalition, Hadash, for the 1977 elections. Breitstein continued to edit Hedim while in Hadash, though his loyalty to the Hadash party line caused Aki membership to wane further. The last edition of Hedim was published in 1982, the same year Mikunis died. Subsequently, Aki disappeared.
