= Walka =

Polish-language newspaper in Israel

Walka (lit. Struggle) was a Polish-language newspaper published from Tel Aviv by the Communist Party of Israel between 1958 and 1965. Its editor-in-chief was Adolf Berman.

== History ==
Whilst other Communist Party weeklies experienced a gradual decline in readership after 1956, Walka had a moderate growth as a result of the wave of immigration from Poland in 1961. Its weekly circulation was 929 in April 1961, 1,058 in May 1961, 986 in August 1961, 1,095 in June 1962, 1,114 in December 1962, 1,149 in June 1963 and 1,116 in December 1963.

When the Communist Party went through a split in 1965, the editors of Walka sided with Meir Vilner and his new party Rakah.
