= Shmuel Mikunis =

Israeli politician (1903–1982)

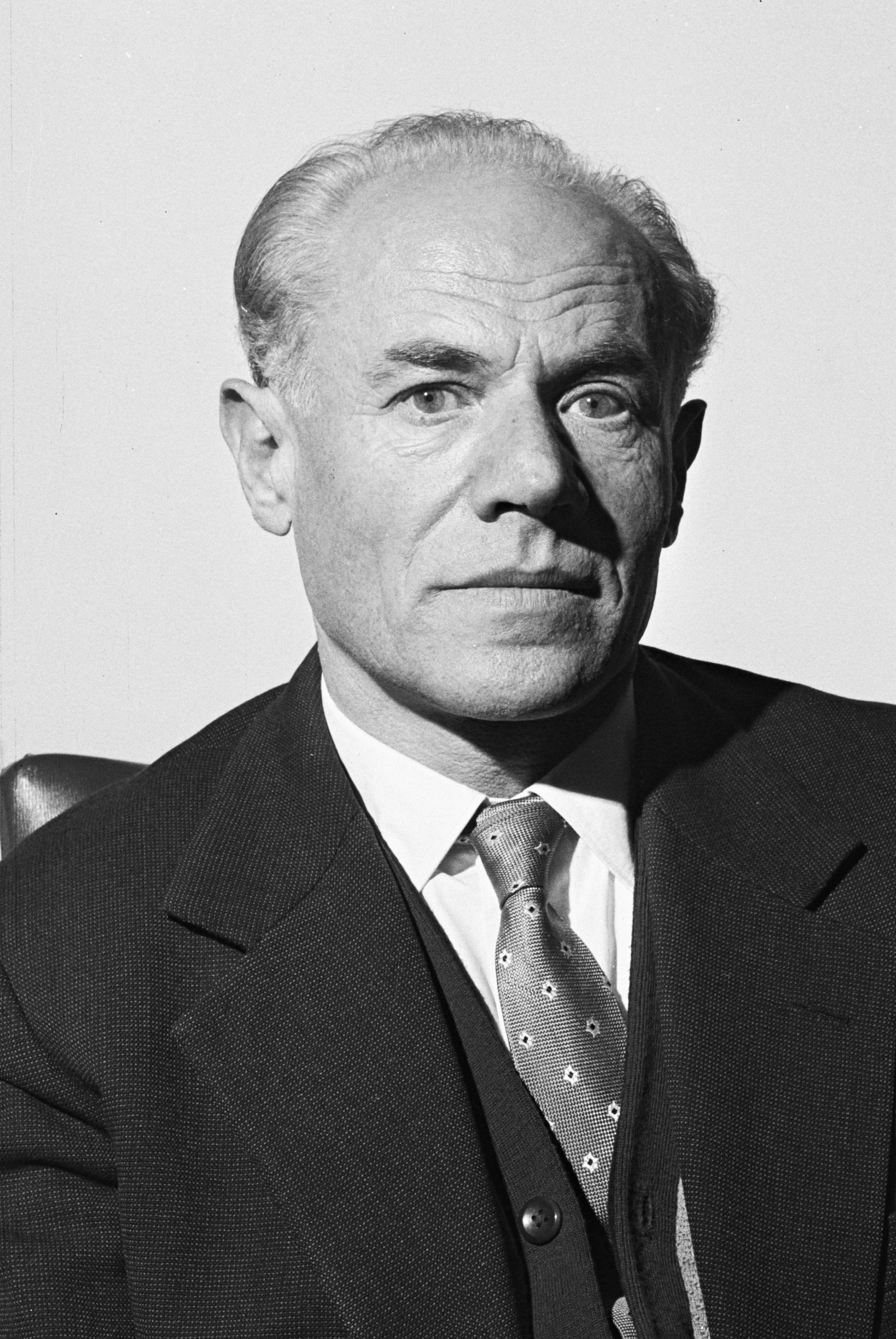
- Mikunis in 1959

Faction represented in the Knesset
- 1949–1969: Maki
- 1972–1973: Maki
- 1973–1974: Moked

Personal details
- Born: 10 August 1903 Polonne, Russian Empire
- Died: 20 May 1982 (aged 78) Tel Aviv, Israel

Shmuel Mikunis (Hebrew: שמואל מיקוניס; 10 August 1903 – 20 May 1982) was an Israeli politician. He was a member of the Knesset for the Maki (1949–1969, 1972–1973) and Moked (1973–1974) parties.

== Biography ==
Born to a Hasidic Jewish family in Polonne in the Russian Empire (today in Ukraine), Mikunis immigrated to Mandatory Palestine in 1921. He claimed two of his brothers remained in the Soviet Union and were murdered during Stalin's rule, though this isn’t confirmed. He attended a polytechnic in France, and was qualified as an engineer, working for the Shell Oil Company between 1933 and 1945.

Mikunis was a member of the Palestine Communist Party. He became secretary of its central committee in 1939. In 1944 he was elected to the Jewish community's Assembly of Representatives. During the 1948 Arab-Israeli War, he acted as an emissary to communist countries, seeking to acquire weapons. After Maki was established in 1948, Mikunis became its secretary and held this position until 1974.

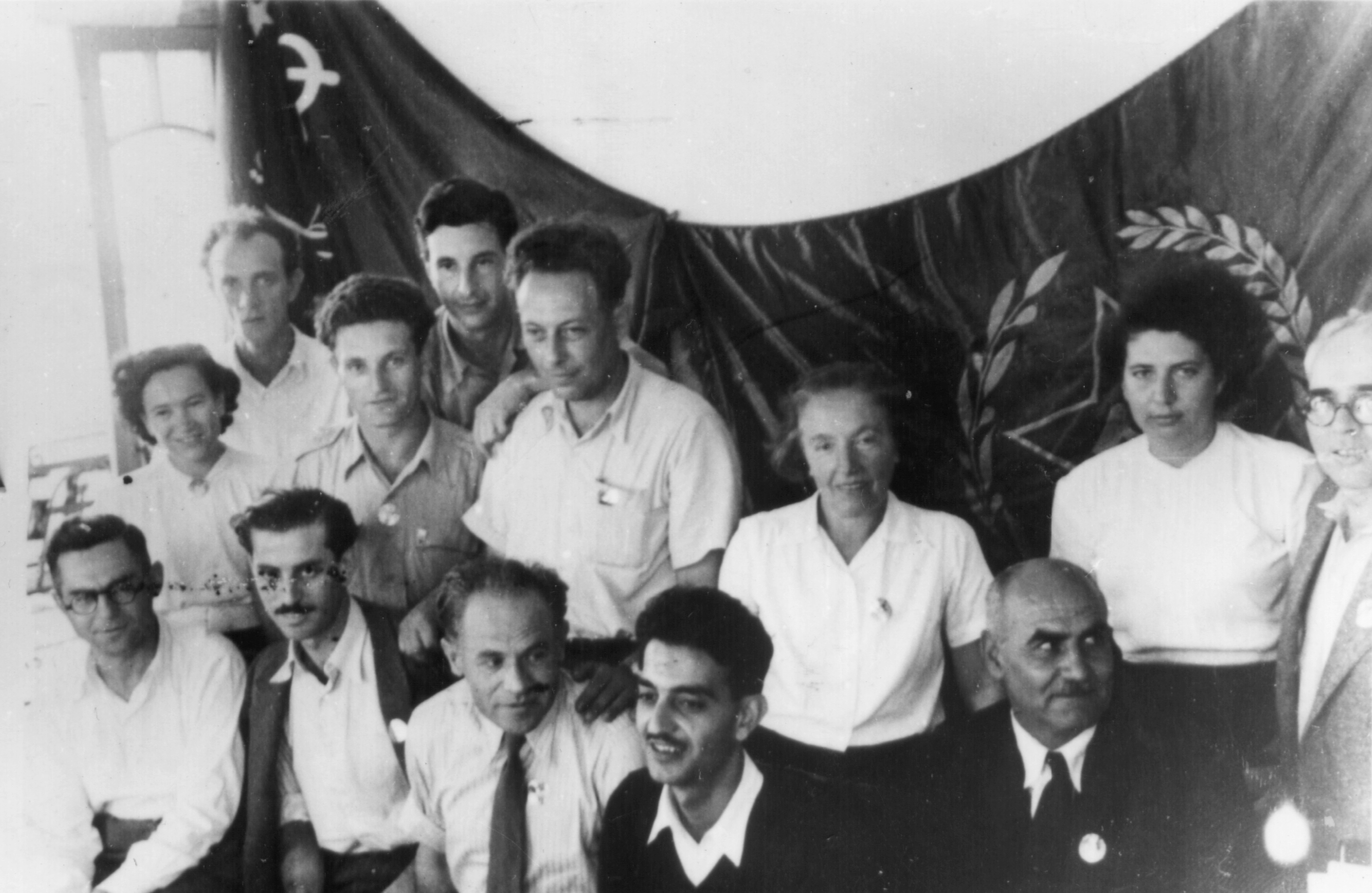
Members of the Israeli Communist Party in Haifa, 23 October 1948. Seated (L-R): Meir Vilner, Tawfik Toubi, Shmuel Mikunis, Emile Habibi, George Garabadian. Standing: Ruth Lubitsch, Eliyahu Drukman, Abraham Feigenboim, Wolf Ehrlich, Alyosha Gozansky, Pnina Feinhaus, Esther Vilenska, Mordechai Biletski.

A member of the Provisional State Council, he was elected to the first Knesset on Maki's list. He was re-elected in 1951, 1955, 1961, and 1965. In the 1960s, he and Moshe Sneh led a faction within Maki that sought to distance the party from the Soviet Union's anti-Israel stance. This faction defended the State of Israel's legitimacy and opposed the policies of neighboring Arab states toward Israel. In contrast, another faction, led by Meir Vilner, adhered to the Soviet line. In 1965 the party finally split and the Mikunis-Sneh party was reduced to one seat in the parliamentary election due to the split (from which Rakah had been formed).

Mikunis lost his seat in the 1969 elections, but re-entered the Knesset in March 1972 as a replacement for Moshe Sneh. Towards the end of the session, Maki and the Blue-Red Movement merged into Moked and Mikunis lost his seat in the 1973 elections. In 1974, Mikunis left Moked, deeming it as too Zionist and moderate, and joined the Israeli Communist Opposition (Aki), led by his fellow Maki defector Esther Vilenska. Aki then joined with Rakah to form Hadash in 1977. Mikunis died on 20 May 1982.

A street in Tel Aviv is named after him.

== Works ==
- B'Saar Tkufot (En - In Stormy Periods: A Selection of Writings and Sayings, 1942-1969) (1969)
- On Contradictions and conclusions (PCP-Maki) (December 1975)
- On National Identity and the struggle for the essential (July 1976)

=== Selected Articles ===
- Israeli Communists and Immigration, Jewish Life (September 1949)
- Light on Israeli Policy, Labour Monthly (February 1956)
- Israel [on the Suez crisis], Labour Monthly (1957)
- For the Life of Israel and her Neighbors, "War and Peace in the Middle East", a Morgen Freiheit publication (October 1967)
