= Ha'ir =

Local newspaper in Tel Aviv, Israel

- Type: Weekly newspaper
- Format: Tabloid
- Owner: Schocken Group
- Editor: Omer Shobert
- Founded: October 1980
- Language: Hebrew
- Country: Israel

Ha'ir (Hebrew: העיר, lit The City) was a weekly local newspaper published in Tel Aviv, Israel. The tabloid-sized newspaper was first published in October 1980.

Ha'ir was published on Thursday evening, and was distributed throughout the metropolitan area of Tel Aviv through newspaper stands.

One of Ha'ir's supplements is Akhbar Ha'ir (Hebrew: עכבר העיר, lit. City Mouse), a Tel Aviv entertainment guide.

Since April 2005 when there was a major shakeup in the business structure of the newspaper's publisher, Schocken Group, it has been distributed for free.

In December 2009, distribution of Ha'ir was stopped to residents of Holon and Petah Tikva after research with focus groups found that residents are not interested in the content that is seen as more relevant to Tel Avivians.

On December 16, 2010, "Ha'ir" was merged into its supplement "Akbar Ha'ir".

In August 2017, the Haaretz group decided to cease printing "Akbar Ha'ir".

== See also ==
- List of Israeli newspapers
