= Aida Touma-Suleiman =

Israeli politician

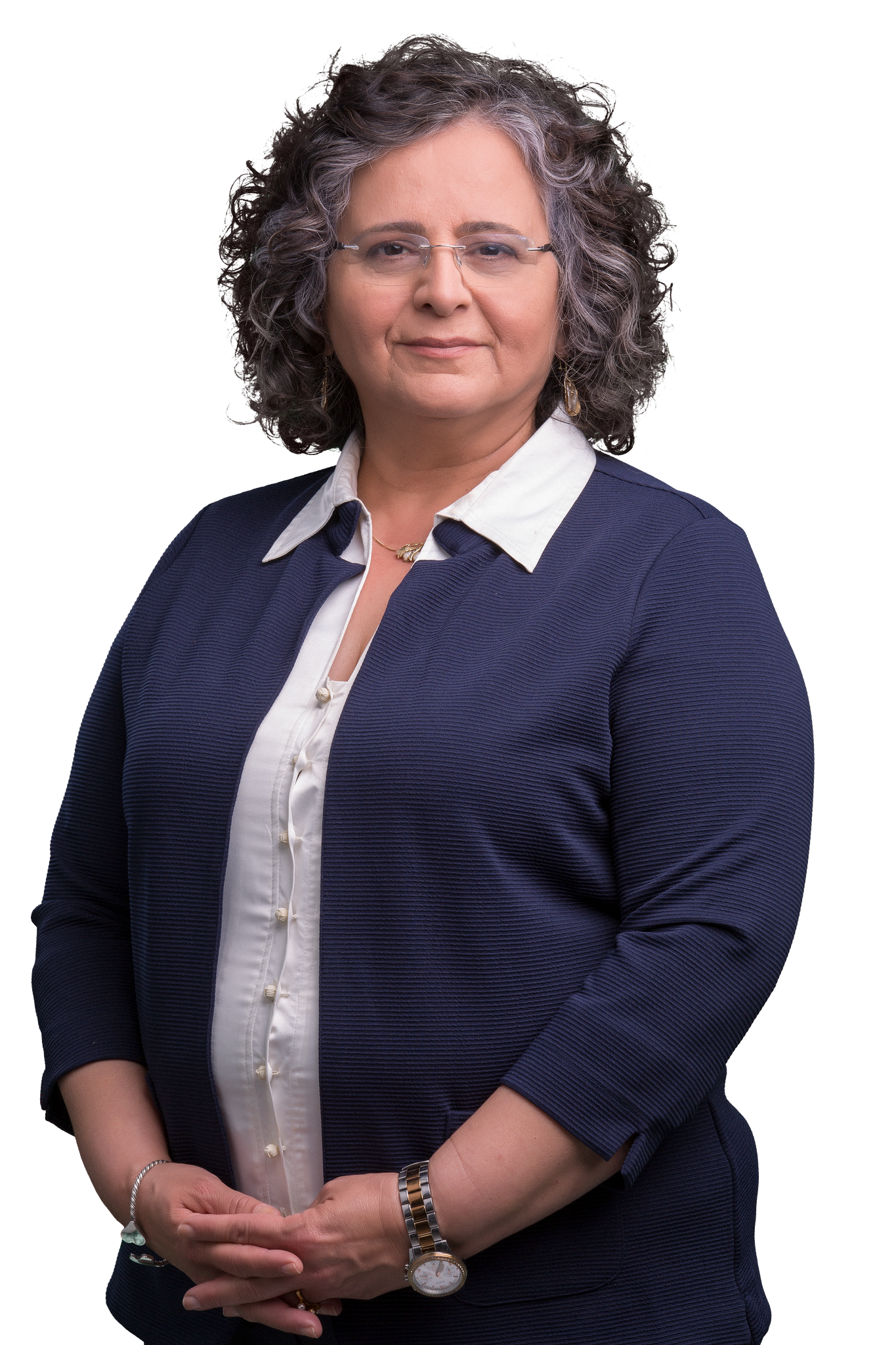
- Touma-Suleiman in 2021

Faction represented in the Knesset
- 2015–2019: Joint List
- 2019: Hadash
- 2019–2022: Joint List
- 2022–2026: Hadash-Ta'al

Personal details
- Born: 16 July 1964 (age 62) Nazareth, Israel

Aida Touma-Suleiman (Arabic: عايدة توما سليمان, Hebrew: עָאִידָה תּוּמָא סֻלִימָאן; born 16 July 1964) is an Israeli Arab journalist and politician. She was a member of the Knesset for Hadash from 2015 until 2026.

== Biography ==
Aida Touma-Suleiman was born in Nazareth, Israel, into an Arab Christian family. She attended St. Joseph's School in Nazareth, and gained a B.A. in psychology and Arabic literature from the University of Haifa.

Touma-Suleiman lives in Acre with her two daughters. Her husband Jiris Suleiman died from cancer in 2011. She is an atheist.

== Political career ==
=== Political causes ===
Touma-Suleiman founded the Arab feminist group Women Against Violence in 1992, and has been its CEO since its foundation. She joined the Hadash party, later becoming editor in chief of Al-Ittihad, an Arabic language newspaper owned by the Israeli Communist Party, a faction in Hadash. She also became the first female member of the High Follow-Up Committee for Arab Citizens of Israel. She also co-founded the International Women's Commission for a Just Palestinian–Israeli Peace.

=== Unsuccessful runs for Knesset seat ===
Aida Touma-Suleiman repeatedly campaigned on the Hadash list for a seat in the Israeli parliament, the Knesset: in 1992 (placed 47th; Hadash won three seats), 1996 (36th on Hadash-Balad list; the alliance won five seats), 1999 (28th on Hadash list, again not sufficient), 2009 (fifth on Hadash list, the party won four seats). After contesting the second place on the party's list for the 2013 elections against the incumbent Hana Sweid, a victory for Sweid meant that she was placed 98th on the party's list.

=== Knesset member (2015-) ===
==== Election ====
Prior to the 2015 elections, Hadash joined the Joint List, an alliance with Balad, the United Arab List, and Ta'al. Touma-Suleiman was placed fifth on the candidates list of the Joint List, and was elected to the Knesset as the alliance won 13 seats. She is the fourth Arab-Israeli woman to become a member of the Knesset, following Hussniya Jabara (Meretz), Hanin Zoabi (Joint List), and Nadia Hilou (Labor), and the second Arab-Israeli woman member of the Knesset from a non-Zionist party.

Touma-Suleiman did not seek renomination to Hadash's electoral list at the May 2026 Hadash conference, and will thus not seek re-election to the Knesset in the upcoming legislative election.

==== Head of Women's Status Committee ====
In June 2015, she was elected to head the Knesset's Committee on the Status of Women and Gender Equality. Suleiman was appointed to this position through a unanimous vote. She has attended hearings of the committee since 1992. Suleiman noted that she is planning for cooperative efforts with the Ministry for Social Equality head, Gila Gamliel (Likud), who is also responsible for gender equality.

==== Against "honor crimes" ====
Touma-Suleiman has reported that the subject of honor killing was a taboo among Arabs in Israel until protests in the 1990s by the Israeli Palestinian feminist women’s groups Al-Fanar and al-Badeel forced open discussion in the Arab population. Although there reportedly exist safe houses for women and girls at risk, the Israel police and other authorities have not always utilized such shelters.

==== On Arab world and Israel ====
In an interview with an American Jewish student newspaper in 2016, Suleiman explained that she condemned Saudi Arabia and other Gulf nations that support terrorist organizations such as ISIS. She also spoke of Hezbollah, Israel, and the current situation: "As a woman living in a place that suffered Hezbollah's bombardment, when there was a need to condemn the bombing of a civilian population, we were the first to do so. And when it was necessary to condemn the Israeli government - we did that too. I believe that this gives us the right to make complex observations, since the situation is complex."

In 2019, she was critical of Arab countries normalizing diplomatic ties with Israel and said it was important for Palestinians to preserve their Arab identity. In November 2023 she was suspended from the Knesset for two months after accusing the Israel Defense Forces of war crimes.

==== COVID-19 ====
In 2020, after being reelected to the Knesset during the COVID-19 pandemic, Touma-Suleiman tweeted a video of a disinfection of a West Bank checkpoint with the commentary, "Another atrocity by the occupation under the cover of the coronavirus — the IDF is spraying Palestinians at the Qalqilya checkpoint with an unknown substance. Everyone agrees the spraying method is not effective in the fight against the virus. The horrors being committed under the cover of the crisis can't be ignored." The video actually showed Palestinian Authority employees disinfecting the Palestinian side of the checkpoint to combat coronavirus. Yamina MK Naftali Bennett responded to the tweet with his own tweet calling Touma-Suleiman "a liar, anti-Semitic and contemptible." Touma-Suleiman deleted the tweet and claimed she had been "misled." She added, "At least I have the courage and the integrity to admit mistakes. You continue to callously lie even when the truth is clear."

==== On Arabic-speaking LGBTQ Israelis ====
In July 2020 Touma-Suleiman expressed support for the LGBT community in response to a boycott of Al-Arz, an Arab Israeli company very popular for the tahini it produces, by social conservatives after Al-Arz's CEO, Julia Zaher donated to The Aguda – Israel's LGBT Task Force to establish a crisis hotline for Arabic-speaking LGBTQ Israelis.
