= Maki (historical political party) =

Political party in Israel (1948–1973)

Maki מִקִ״י הַמִפְלָגָה הַקוֹמוּנִיסְטִית הַיִשְׂרְאֵלִית
- Leader: Shmuel Mikunis; Moshe Sneh
- Founded: 1948
- Dissolved: 25 July 1973
- Merger of: Hebrew Communists, the National Liberation League and the Palestine Communist Party
- Merged into: Moked
- Newspaper: Al-Ittihad, Kol HaAm, Walka
- Youth wing: Young Communist League of Israel
- Ideology: Communism; Non-Zionism
- Political position: Far-left
- Most MKs: 7 (1954–1955)
- Fewest MKs: 1 (1965–1973)

Election symbol
- ק

Maki (Hebrew: מִקִ״י, abbreviation for הַמִפְלָגָה הַקוֹמוּנִיסְטִית הַיִשְׂרְאֵלִית, HaMiflega HaKomunistit HaYisraelit, 'Israeli Communist Party') was a communist political party in Israel.

== History ==
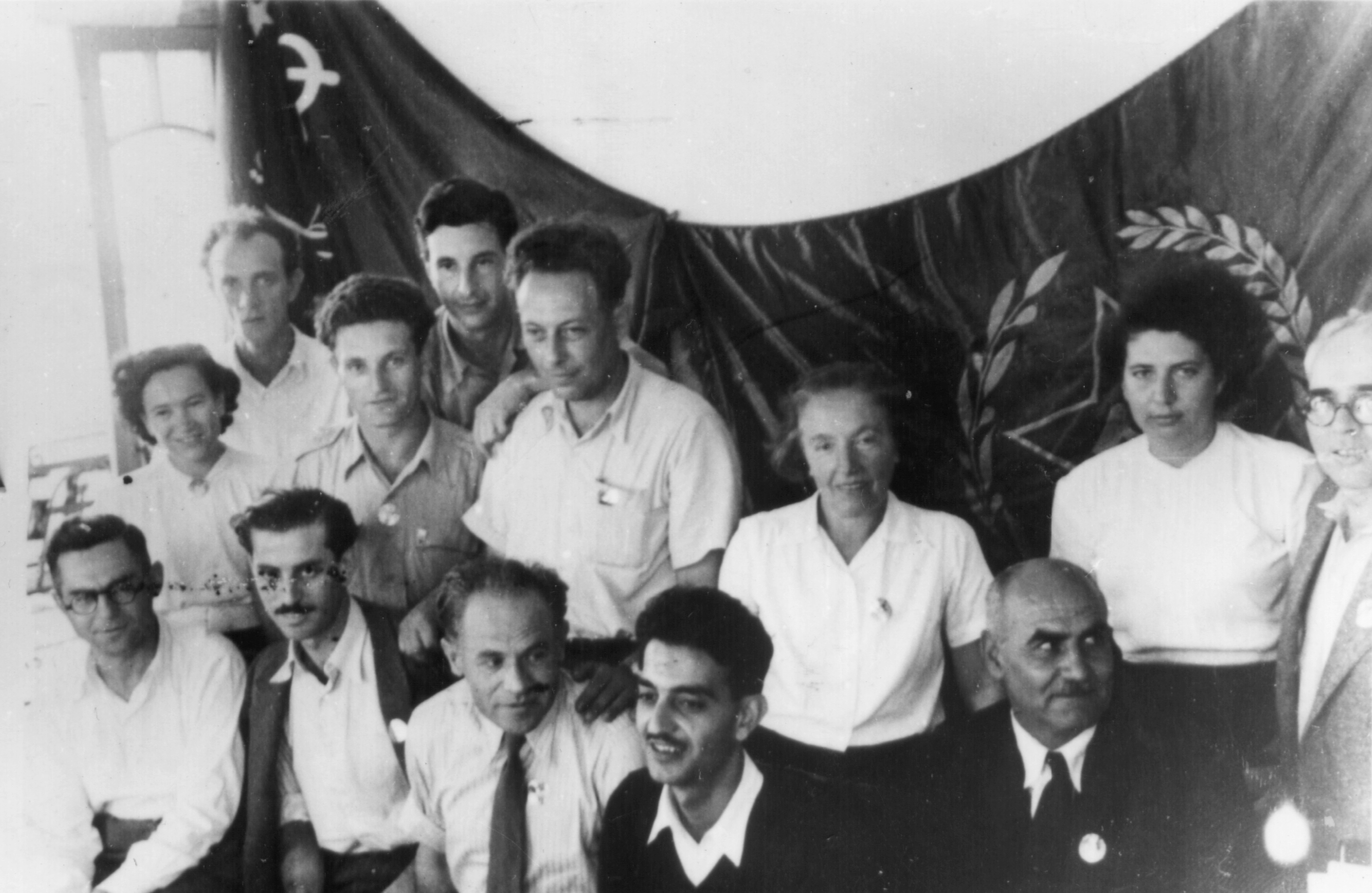
Members of the Israeli Communist Party in Haifa, 23 October 1948. Seated (L-R): Meir Vilner, Tawfik Toubi, Shmuel Mikunis, Emile Habibi, George Garabadian. Standing: Ruth Lubitsch, Eliyahu Drukman, Abraham Feigenboim, Wolf Ehrlich, Alyosha Gozansky, Pnina Feinhaus, Esther Vilenska, Mordechai Biletski.

Maki was a descendant of the Palestine Communist Party (PCP), which changed its name to MAKEI (the Communist Party of Eretz Yisrael) after endorsing partition in 1947, and then to Maki. Members of the National Liberation League, an Arab party that had split from the PCP in 1944, rejoined Maki in October 1948, giving the party both Jewish and Arab members, while the Hebrew Communists also joined the party. The party took over publication of two communist newspapers, Kol HaAm (Hebrew) and Al-Ittihad (Arabic). The party was not Zionist, but recognized Israel, though it denied the link between the state and the Jewish diaspora, and asserted the right of Palestinians to form a state in accordance with the United Nations resolution on partition.

Maki election poster from first Knesset elections in 1949

In the first Knesset elections in 1949 the party received 3.5% of the vote and won four seats, which were taken by Shmuel Mikunis, Eliezer Preminger, Tawfik Toubi and Meir Vilner. During the session, Preminger left the party and re-established the Hebrew Communists before joining Mapam.

In the 1951 elections Maki received 4% of the vote and won five seats, with Emil Habibi and Esther Vilenska entering the Knesset. During the session, the Prague Trials of 1952 caused the pro-Soviet Labour Zionist Mapam to break with the Soviet Union. Unhappy at the decision, Mapam members Avraham Berman and Moshe Sneh left Mapam and set up the Left Faction before joining Maki. The party was also involved in the fall of Moshe Sharett's fifth government, when it and Herut brought a motion of no confidence over the government's position on the trial of Malkiel Gruenwald, who had accused Rudolf Kastner of collaborating with the Nazis.

In the 1955 elections, Maki's share of the vote increased again as it won six seats in the Knesset. It launched a Polish-language newspaper, Walka, in 1958. However, the 1959 elections saw the party perform poorly, winning only three seats.

The 1961 election campaign was helped by the ruling coalition's involvement in the Lavon Affair, and Maki gained five seats. However, during the early 1960s tensions within the party intensified between the largely Jewish faction of Moshe Sneh and Shmuel Mikunis, which considered Israeli national interests and accepted Israel's right to exist, and the mostly Arab faction of Meir Vilner, which accepted the Soviet pro-Arab and anti-Zionist stance without reservation. The internal disagreements finally led to a split in 1965, with Sneh's faction retaining the name Maki, while the pro-Palestinian faction (Toubi and Vilner) left to form Rakah ("New Communist List"), which the Soviet Union recognised as the "official" Communist Party. It was reported in the Soviet media that the Mikunis–Sneh group had defected to the bourgeois-nationalist camp.

The 1965 elections were a disaster, with the party winning only one seat, while Rakah won three. Maki supported the Six-Day War in 1967, and then went on to repeat its poor performance in the 1969 elections, winning just a single seat. The party merged with the Blue-Red Movement in 1973 to form Moked, and subsequently disappeared as an independent party. Moked won one seat in the 1973 elections. Later it became part of Left Camp of Israel (in 1977), then Ratz (in 1981).

In the meantime, Rakah had become the leading force in the Hadash alliance, which it established alongside other leftist organizations in 1977. In 1989, several years after Maki's demise, Rakah changed its name to Maki. Party leaders asserted at the time that their party, rather than the rival faction that merged among the forces of the Zionist Left, had the better claim upon the historic heritage of what the name stood for in the 1950s and early 1960s.

== Election results ==
Election	Lead candidate	Votes	%	Position	Seats	+ / –	Status
1949	Shmuel Mikunis	15,148	3.5	7th	4 / 120		Opposition
1951	Shmuel Mikunis	27,334	4.0	▲6th	5 / 120	▲1	Opposition
1955	Shmuel Mikunis	38,492	4.5	▼8th	6 / 120	▲1	Opposition
1959	Shmuel Mikunis	27,374	2.8	▼9th	3 / 120	▼3	Opposition
1961	Shmuel Mikunis	42,111	4.2	▲7th	5 / 120	▲2	Opposition
1965 (Note: Following internal split resulting in the creation of Rakah)	Shmuel Mikunis	13,617	1.1	▼13th	1 / 120	▼4	Opposition
1969	Moshe Sneh	15,712	1.1	13th	1 / 120	Steady	Opposition
