= Sha'ar LaMathil =

Former Israeli newspaper

- Type: Weekly newspaper
- Founded: 1956
- Ceased publication: 2012
- Language: Hebrew
- Country: Israel

Sha’ar LaMatchil (in Hebrew שער למתחיל, Gateway for the Beginner), was a weekly Israeli newspaper written in easy Hebrew. Publication ceased as of April 2012.

The weekly was founded in 1956 by the "Department for Language Endowment" of the Israeli Ministry of Education. The newspaper is intended for olim and other newcomers to Israel who are learning the Hebrew Language, and is also designed for those who are studying Hebrew at an ulpan. The newspaper addresses many different topics in varying degrees of language complexity. It is written with nikudot and a large typeface.

The newspaper is edited in Tel Aviv, and is part of the Yediot Ahronot publishing group.

== History ==
The newspaper was founded in 1956 and initially comprised two separate newspapers: "Gateway" and "To Begin." In 1978 the two newspapers were combined under a new name. The newspaper was originally published by the Jerusalem Post before it was transferred to Yedioth Ahronot. In 2012 the newspaper was discontinued and is no longer published.

== Digital Edition ==
In January 2009, Sha’ar La’Matchil launched an online version.

In addition to written articles, the digital edition contains audio files of selected articles, which are recorded in clear Hebrew to help learners of the language.
