= Moshe Sneh =

Israeli politician

- מֹשֶׁה סְנֶה
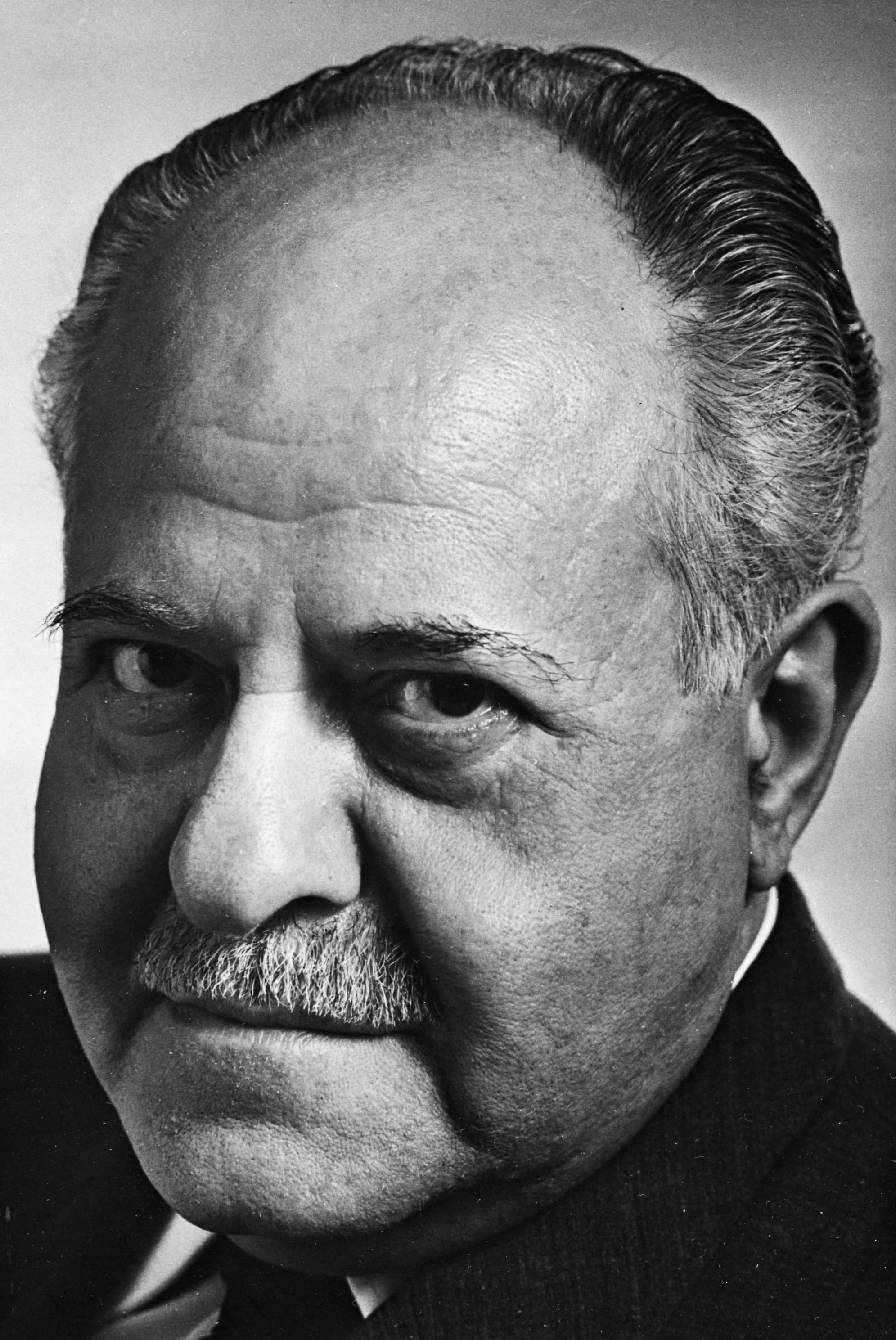
- Sneh in 1970

Faction represented in the Knesset
- 1949–1952: Mapam
- 1952–1954: Left Faction
- 1954–1972: Maki

Personal details
- Born: Mosze Klaynboym; 6 January 1909 Radzyń, Congress Poland, Russian Empire
- Died: 1 March 1972 (aged 63) Tel Aviv, Israel
- Resting place: Nahalat Yitzhak Cemetery
- Spouse: Hannah
- Children: Efraim
- Education: University of Warsaw

Moshe Sneh (Hebrew: מֹשֶׁה סְנֶה; 6 January 1909 – 1 March 1972) was a Haganah commander and an Israeli politician. One of the founders of Mapam, he later joined the Israeli Communist Party (Maki).

== Biography ==
Mosze Klaynboym (later Sneh) attended high school in Poland before studying natural sciences, mathematics and medicine at the University of Warsaw, gaining an MD in 1935. Whilst a student, he was a member of the Yardinia Zionist student organisation, becoming its chairman in 1926, and was also chairman of the Medical Jewish Students Union.

He became the editor of the Nowe Słowo newspaper in 1931, and the political editor of Haynt in 1933. In 1932, he was elected to the central committee of the Zionist Federation of Poland, and was a leader of the Radical Zionists.

He worked as a doctor until 1939, including in the Polish Army following the outbreak of World War II, and immigrated to Mandatory Palestine in 1940.

Upon arriving in Mandatory Palestine, he joined the Haganah, and was head of its general staff in 1941–1946.

His son, Efraim Sneh, served as both Health and Transportation Minister for the Labour Party before leaving the Knesset in 2008 to form his own party, Yisrael Hazaka.

== Political career ==
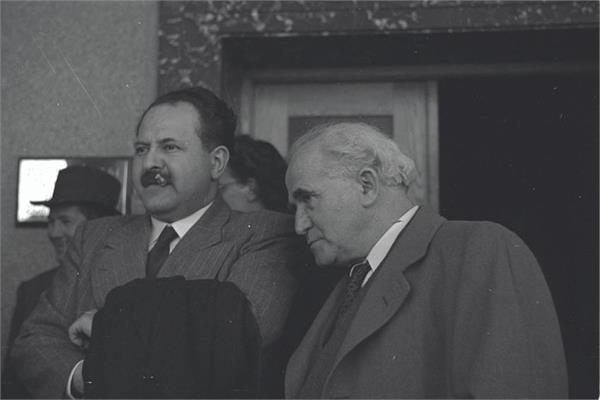
Sneh with David Ben-Gurion, 29 November 1947

In 1944 he joined the Jewish National Council, and became a member of the Assembly of Representatives. He served as the head of the political department of the Jewish Agency. Sneh's name was on the British Police's wanted list in Operation Agatha, but he avoided arrest by fleeing to Paris.

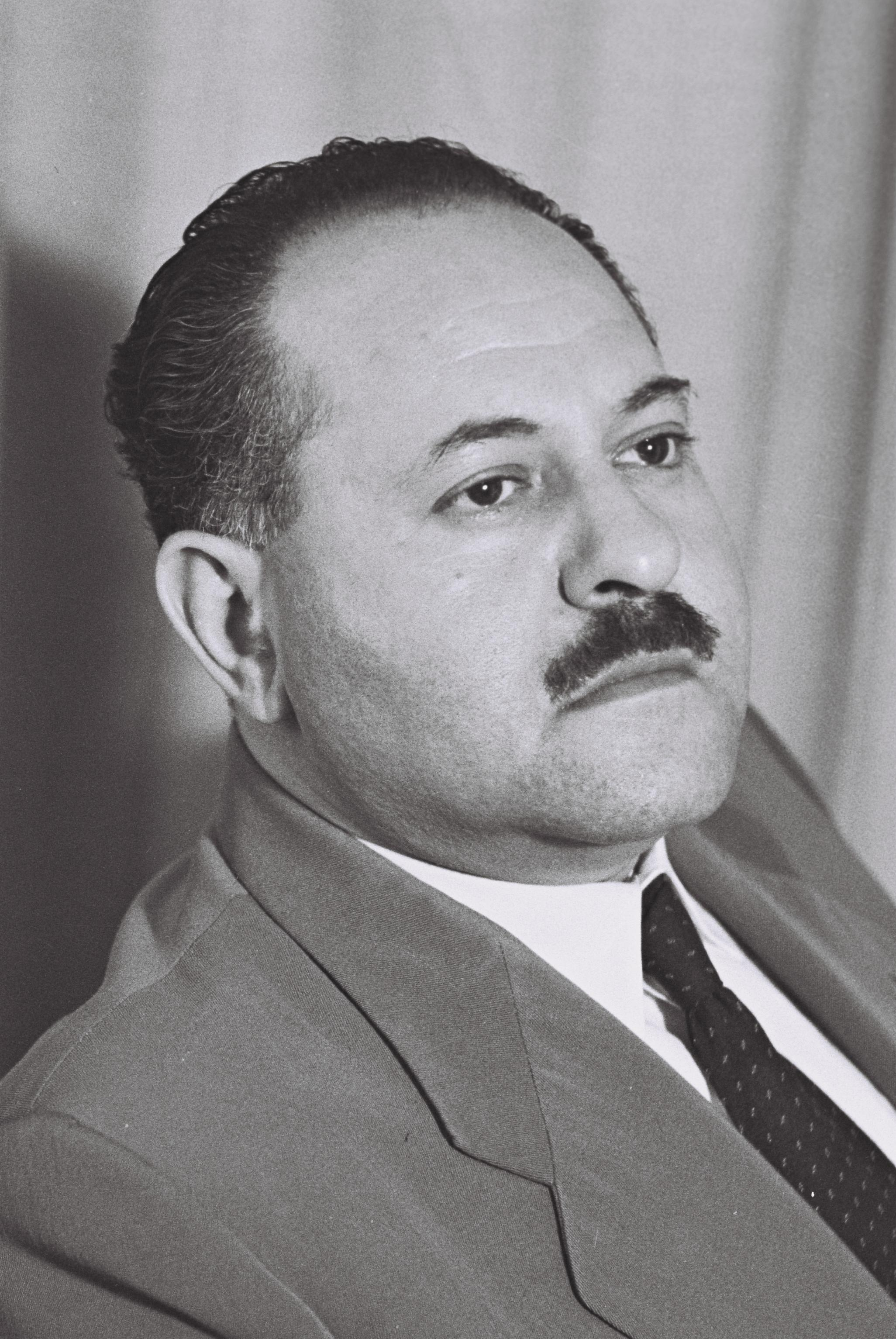
Sneh's official Knesset portrait, 1951

Sneh was a member of the General Zionists party. In 1947, he joined Mapam and was appointed deputy editor of the party's newspaper, Al HaMishmar, a position he held until 1953. In 1949 he was elected to the first Knesset. Re-elected in 1951, he was part of the group that split from the party in 1953, when false accusations against its envoy during the Prague Trials led to the party renouncing its support for the Soviet Union. Sneh initially formed the Left Faction, before joining Maki in 1954.

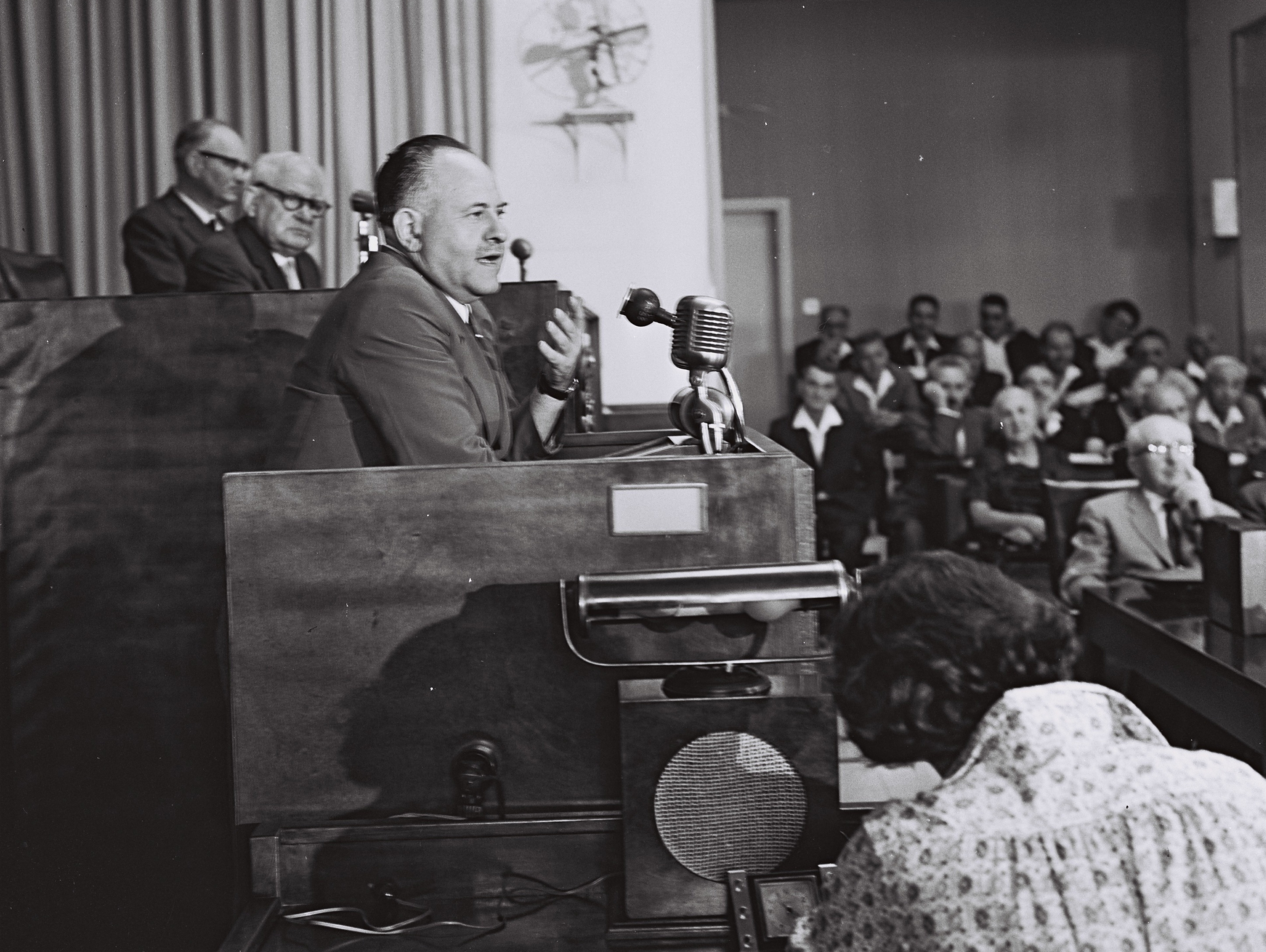
Sneh speaking in the Knesset, 9 April 1961

He returned to the Knesset on Maki's list in the 1955 elections, but narrowly missed winning seat in 1959. However, he entered the Knesset six weeks later as a replacement for Meir Vilner. Re-elected in 1961, Sneh remained in Maki when two of the party's MKs broke away to form Rakah in 1965. He lost his seat in the 1965 elections when Maki was reduced to one seat (most of its vote having gone to Rakah), but returned to the Knesset again in 1969, remaining the sole Maki MK until his death in March 1972.
