= Al-Ittihad (Israeli newspaper) =

Arabic language newspaper in Israel

- Type: Daily newspaper
- Owner: Maki
- Founder(s): Emile Touma, Fuad Nassar, Emil Habibi
- Editor: Aida Touma-Suleiman
- Founded: 1944
- Political alignment: Communism; Marxism–Leninism
- Language: Arabic
- Headquarters: Haifa, Israel
- Country: Israel
- Website: alittihad44.com

Al-Ittihad (Arabic: الاتحاد, lit. 'The Union') is an Arabic language daily newspaper in Israel. Based in Haifa, it was established in 1944 and is owned by the Communist Party of Israel. It is the oldest Arabic media outlet in Israel and considered the most important. The newspaper is currently edited by Aida Touma-Suleiman.

== History ==
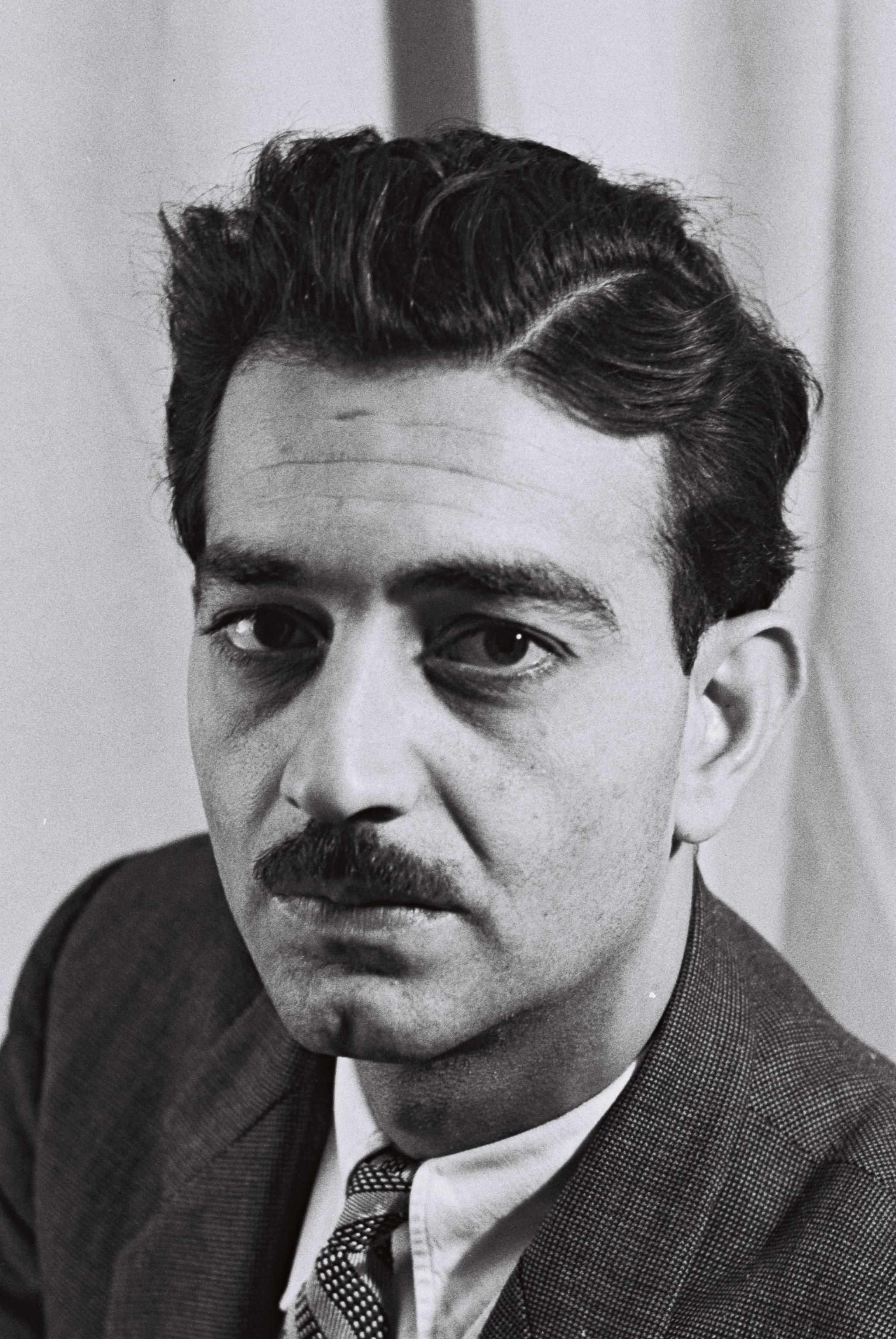
Emile Habibi, one of the founders of Al-Ittihad, editor of the newspaper from 1944 to 1989, and member of the Knesset.

The paper was established in 1944 by Emile Toma, Fu'ad Nassar and Emile Habibi. Its first edition was published on 14 May that year. Habibi edited the paper until 1989. The newspaper functioned as an organ for the National Liberation League in Palestine. From September 1945 onwards it was published in the name of the Arab Workers' Congress. The newspaper was shut down by the British authorities in February 1948, reappearing on 18 October. In July members of the NLL in Haifa contacted the Mapam party, asking them to pressure Israeli authorities to give a license to resume publishing the newspaper. Al-Ittihad was the only pre-state Arabic-language paper to continue publication after independence. In 1948 it moved into a new building on Al-Hariri Road. In the years after independence when Israeli Arabs were subject to military government, the paper was banned in some areas. It was later banned in the West Bank.

In 1953 Al-Ittihad and its Hebrew sister newspaper, Kol HaAm, published a controversial article on the Korean War, which resulted in the Minister of Internal Affairs, Israel Rokach, ordering both papers to close for 15 days. The papers filed a petition to the Supreme Court, which ruled that the suspension had been wrongly issued and should be set aside. The ruling utilised the Declaration of Independence in making its judgment on the issue of free speech, the first time the declaration had been used as an instrument for interpretation.

While other communist newspapers lost much of their readership after the 1956 war, Al-Ittihad was able to recover, regaining its pre-war readership level by 1961. In 1961, the readership of its Friday edition was twice as large as the readership of Kol HaAm, in spite of the fact that Arabs made up only 11.3% of the country's population, and literacy levels were generally lower in the Arab community. The paper's readership continued to grow gradually for some time. Initially a weekly paper, it was later published biweekly, finally becoming a daily newspaper in 1983.

In 1988 the government again ordered it closed for a week, six days before Land Day.

Due to financial problems and the loss of senior reporters, the newspaper had moved to Hadash party headquarters in Nazareth, and then returned to Haifa to a building on HaMaronitim Road. In 2006 staff were preparing to return to its Al-Hariri Road location, but the building was hit by a rocket during the 2006 Lebanon War and badly damaged.

In January 2019, the paper launched a website, marking its transition from print to digital media.

== Staff ==
=== Editors ===
- Ahmad Sa'd
- Aida Touma-Suleiman

=== Writers ===
- Mahmoud Darwish
- Salim Joubran
- Samih al-Qasim
- Tawfik Toubi
- Tawfiq Ziad
- Jabra Nicola
