= Meir Vilner =

Israeli communist leader (1918-2003)

- מאיר וילנר
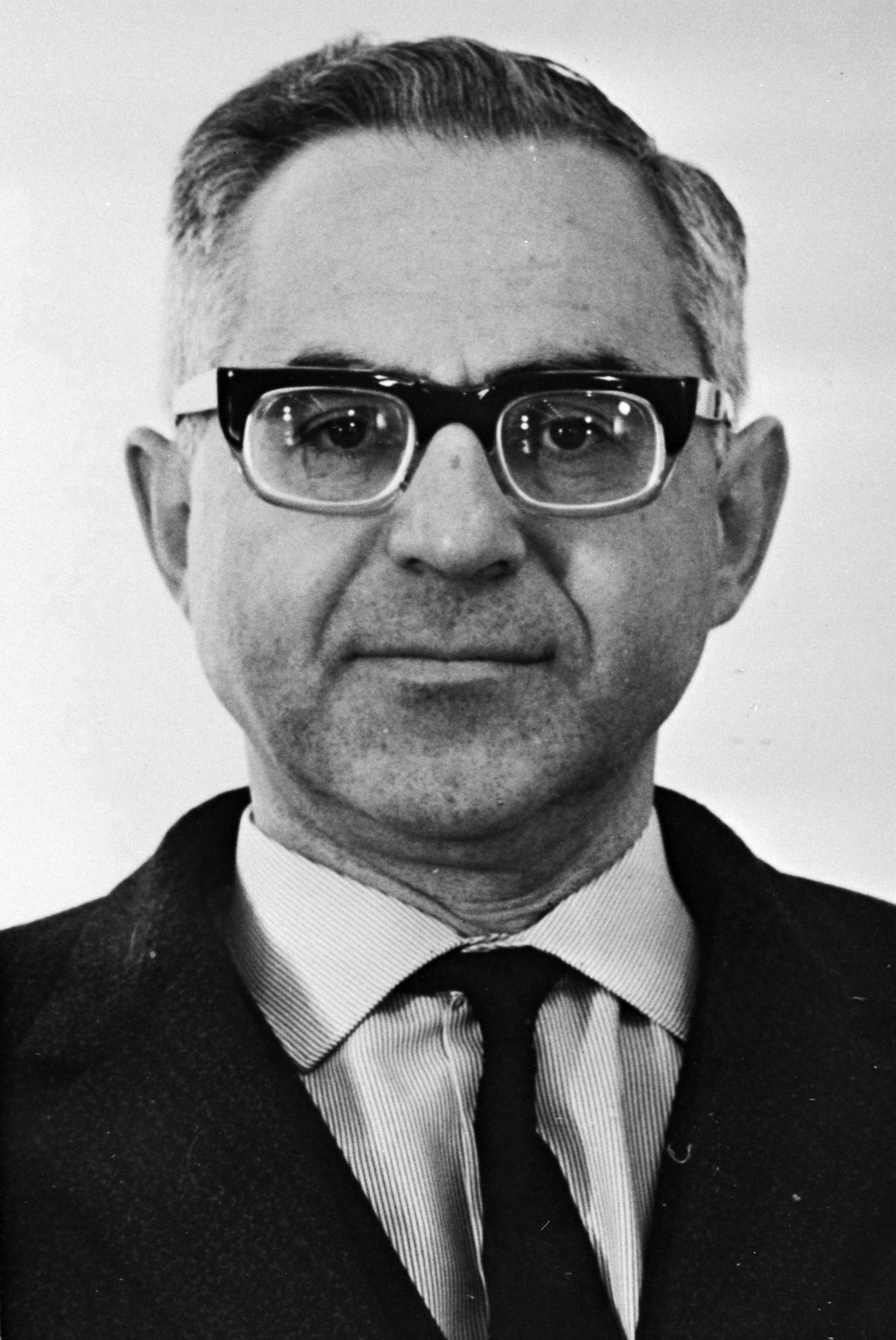
- Vilner in 1969

General Secretary of the Communist Party of Israel
- In office 1 September 1965 – 21 May 1990
- Preceded by: Position established
- Succeeded by: Tawfik Toubi

Faction represented in the Knesset
- 1949–1959: Maki
- 1961: Maki
- 1965–1977: Rakah
- 1977–1990: Hadash

Personal details
- Born: Ber Kovner; 23 October 1918 Vilnius, Kingdom of Lithuania
- Died: 5 June 2003 (aged 84) Tel Aviv, Israel
- Resting place: Yarkon Cemetery
- Spouse: Esther Vilenska (divorced)
- Children: 2
- Relatives: Abba Kovner (cousin); Vitka Kempner (cousin-in-law)
- Education: Hebrew University of Jerusalem

Meir Vilner (Hebrew: מאיר וילנר; born Ber Kovner; 23 October 1918 – 5 June 2003) was a Lithuanian-born Israeli communist politician and Jewish leader of the Communist Party of Israel (Maki), at one time a powerful force in the country. He was the youngest and last living signatory of the Israeli Declaration of Independence in 1948.

== Early life ==
Born Ber Kovner in Vilnius, during the short-lived Kingdom of Lithuania, Vilner's political life began as a leader of the Zionist-socialist youth group Hashomer Hatzair (Young Guard). He served on the local secretariat alongside his cousin Abba Kovner and his future wife Esther Vilenska. However, he soon grew disenchanted by what he viewed as a tendency in Zionist groups to dream of a Jewish homeland in Palestine, rather than change their current socio-economic situation. This ideological clash peaked when the movement's leadership refused to support a fellow member, the young working-class poet Hirsh Glick, in a demand for shorter working hours, and later rejected an offer from left-wing Polish university students to help defend the Jewish neighborhood against antisemitic attacks.

Concluding that Zionism and socialism were contradictory, Vilner and Vilenska left the movement. While later accounts sometimes claimed he then started working for the banned Communist Party of Poland, Vilner stated they had no direct contact with the local underground. Instead, the two spent two years independently studying Marxist literature. Facing university quotas for Jews in Poland, Vilner left in 1938 to go to British-ruled Mandatory Palestine, where he studied history at the Hebrew University of Jerusalem. Most of his family who stayed behind were murdered in the Holocaust.

Vilner's journey to Palestine further radicalized his political views. A brief stop in Alexandria, Egypt, challenged the negative depictions of Arabs he had been taught in Europe, while encountering homelessness in Tel Aviv shattered the utopian image of the Yishuv he had received in Poland. Upon arriving in Haifa, Vilner was appalled when a relative enthusiastically recounted an Irgun bombing in an Arab market in Haifa.

With the outbreak of World War II preventing his return to Vilnius, he officially joined the underground Palestine Communist Party (PCP) in the summer of 1940. It was for this underground work that he adopted the pseudonym "Meir Vilner"—choosing the surname after his birth city, and the first name in honor of an uncle who worked in a radio factory, whom he considered the proletarian of the family. During his early underground years, he faced persecution; in 1942, he was arrested by a Jewish British police officer for smuggling communist leaflets from Tel Aviv to Jerusalem, resulting in a week-long imprisonment.

== Political career ==
=== Palestine Communist Party ===
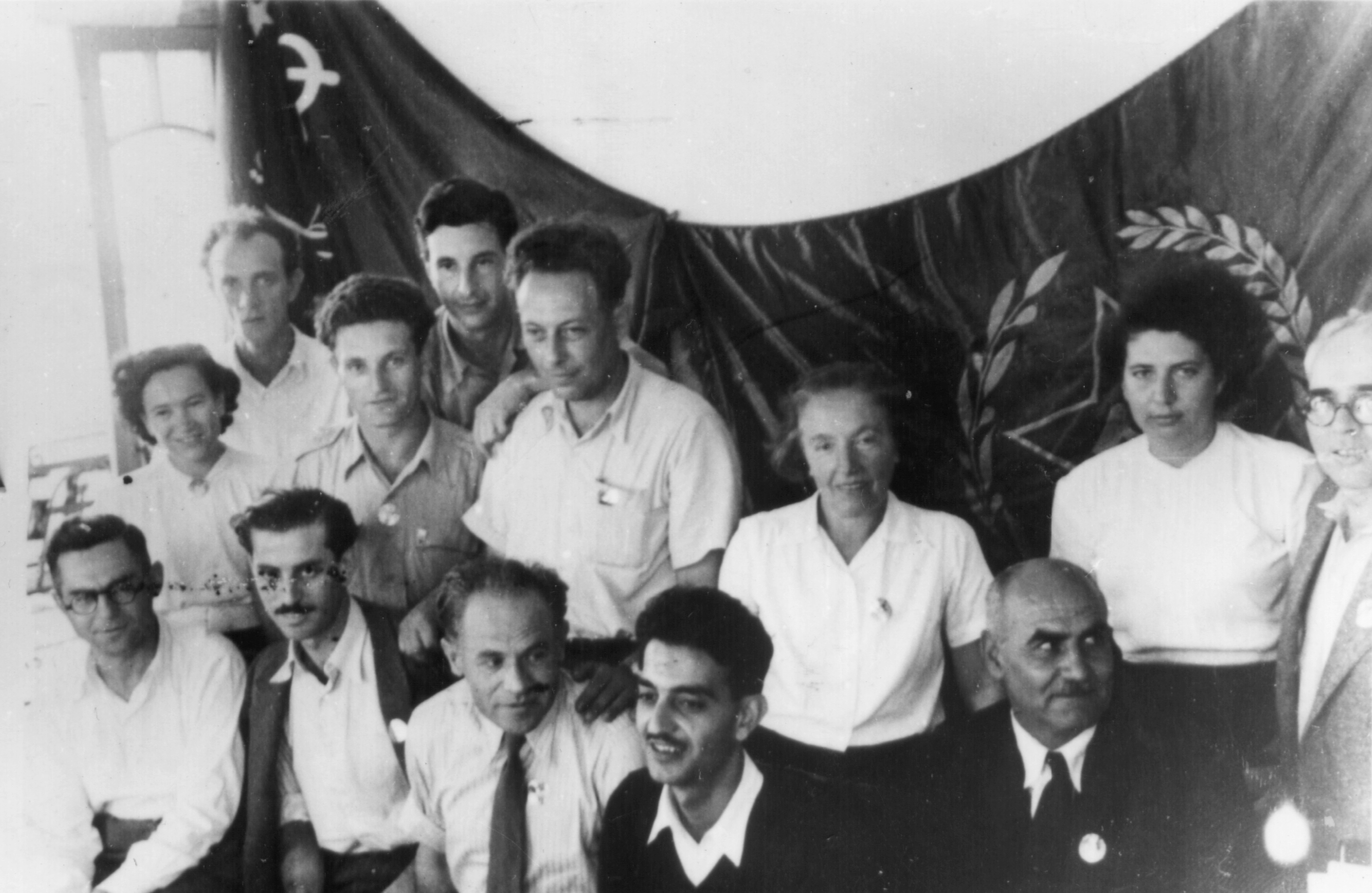
Members of the Israeli Communist Party in Haifa, 23 October 1948. Seated (L-R): Meir Vilner, Tawfik Toubi, Shmuel Mikunis, Emile Habibi, George Garabadian. Standing: Ruth Lubitsch, Eliyahu Drukman, Abraham Feigenboim, Wolf Ehrlich, Alyosha Gozansky, Pnina Feinhaus, Esther Vilenska, Mordechai Biletski.

During the last years of the British mandate, Vilner became disenchanted with mainstream Zionist politicians, claiming that Jewish anti-Arab racism was comparable to the antisemitism he experienced in Vilnius. He joined the Palestine Communist Party (PCP), which accepted both Arabs and Jews as members, and initially opposed plans to partition Palestine into Arab and Jewish states. In March 1946, Vilner testified to the Anglo-American Committee of Inquiry, claiming that partition strengthen the dependency of both states on outside aid and widen the gulf between Arabs and Jews. However, he subsequently changed his mind and supported the 1947 United Nations Partition Plan for Palestine after the Soviet Union's position on partition changed in the same year to one of support.

On May 14, 1948, Vilner participated in the proclamation ceremony of the State of Israel and co-signed the Israeli Declaration of Independence on behalf of the PCP. Along with other PCP members, Vilner stressed the necessity of upholding the declaration's promises to implement United Nations resolutions which called for a two-state solution to the Israeli–Palestinian conflict and uphold civil and political rights for all Israeli citizens.

=== As a member of the Knesset ===
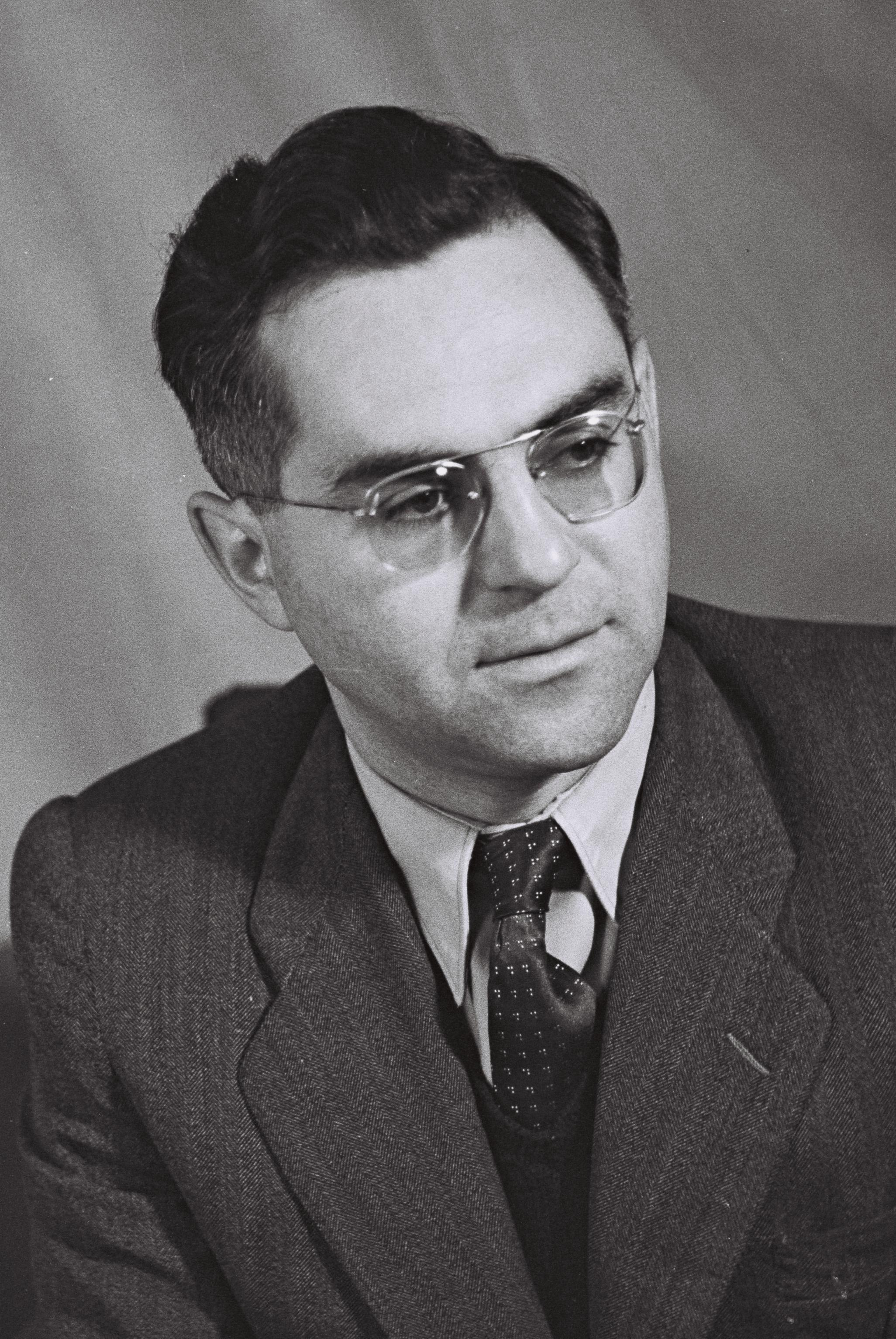
Vilner's official Knesset portrait, 1951

In 1949, he was elected to the Knesset as a member of Maki. He resigned from the Knesset in December 1959, six weeks after the 1959 elections, but was re-elected in 1961. However, he resigned again two months after the 1961 elections.

As the Jewish leader of the Communist Party of Israel (CPI), 95% of whose members were Arabs, he rejected Zionism, publicized the Israeli nuclear weapons program in 1963, and opposed the imposition of martial rule on Israeli Arabs (imposed in 1949, it was lifted in 1966).

In 1965 Vilner and several other Maki members broke away from the party to form the new party Rakah following disagreements about the Soviet Union's increasingly anti-Israel stance (Vilner was on the USSR's side), and was elected to the Knesset on the new party's list in the 1965 elections.

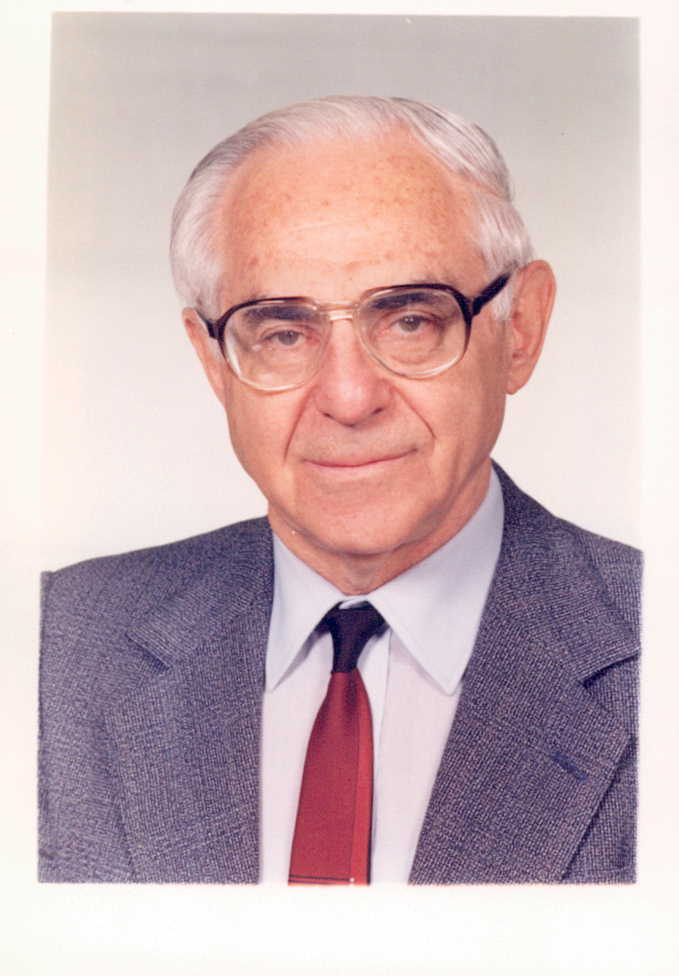
Vilner later in his career

On 5 June 1967, Vilner was the sole Jewish deputy (joined only by fellow Communist Party of Israel deputy Tawfik Toubi) to speak out in the Knesset against the Six-Day War. Calling that day the darkest in Israel's history, Vilner demanded an immediate halt to the Israeli invasion of Arab-occupied lands. Vilner stressed that there was no other way to solve the conflict between Israel and its neighbors but mutual recognition of the national rights of Israelis and Arabs, including the right of the Palestinians to self-determination and independent statehood. On 15 October, he was badly wounded in a stabbing by a member of the right-wing party Gahal.

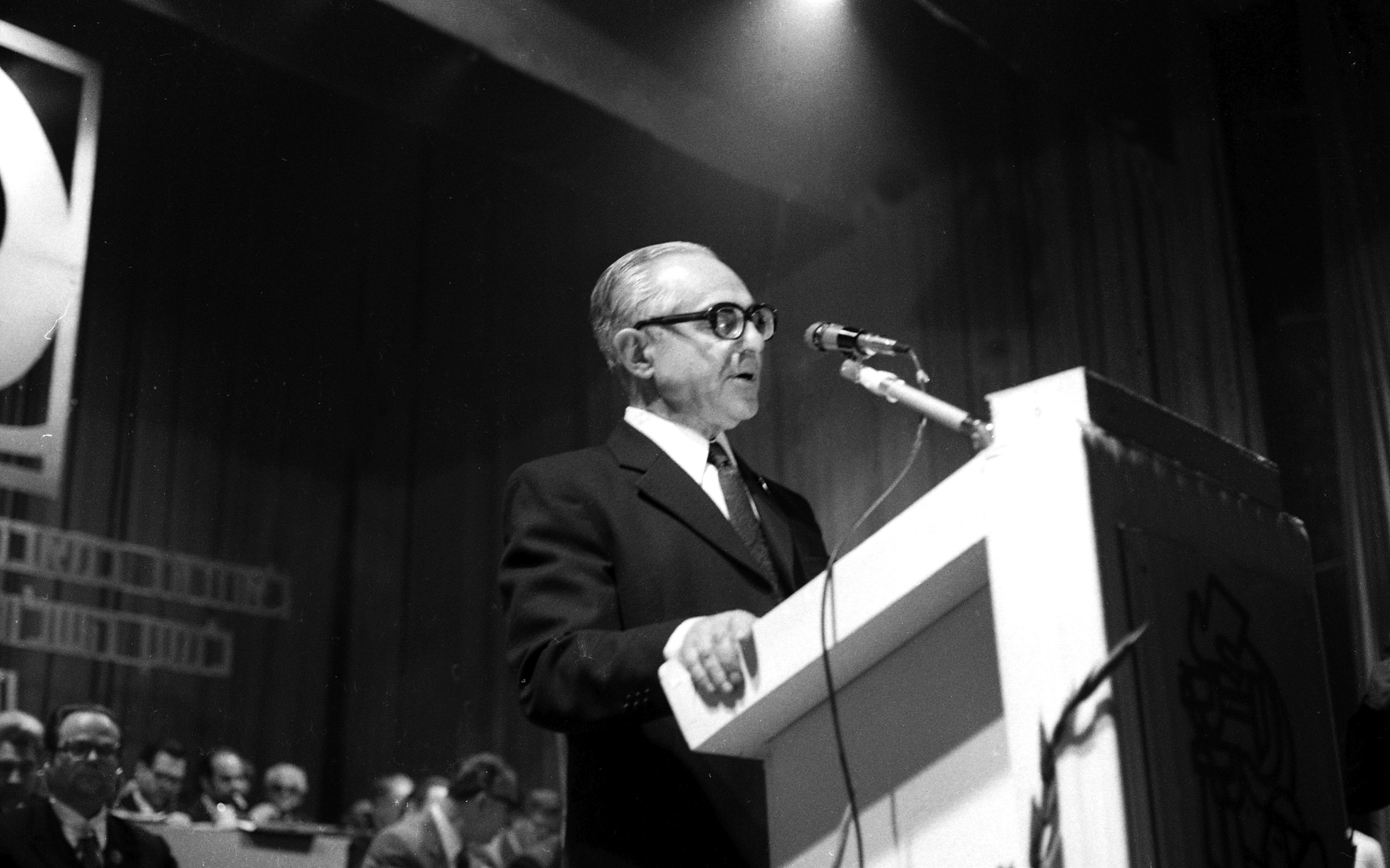
Vilner addresses Rakah's 1976 convention

Rakah became part of Hadash before the 1977 elections, and Vilner remained an MK until 1990 when he resigned as part of a seat rotation agreement, making him the fifth longest serving MK.

=== Soviet ties ===
Vilner's Soviet loyalist line was highly appreciated by the USSR; in 1978 he was awarded the Order of Friendship of Peoples. He did not accept perestroika and regarded the fall of communism in the USSR as a coup.

== Personal life and death ==
He was married to Esther Vilenska, another Israeli communist politician but divorced later, after having two sons together. His cousin Abba Kovner was a well-known Israeli poet and partisan resistance leader during the Holocaust.

Vilner died on June 5, 2003, the last surviving signatory of the Israeli Declaration of Independence. A street in the city of Shafaram is named after him.

== Works ==
=== Books and pamphlets ===
- The Road to Liberation (Hebrew: הדרך לשחרור), 1946.
- Proletarian Internationalism versus Bourgeois Nationalism (Hebrew: אינטרנאציונליזם פרוליטארי מול נאציונליזם בורגני), 1949.
- Meir and Zionism (Yiddish: מיר און דער ציעניזם), 1950.
- Israel's Security: Who Harms It? Who Fortifies It? (Hebrew: ביטחון ישראל: מי פוגע בו? מי מבצר אותו?), 1955.
- The Imperative of the Hour: Changing the Policy of the State of Israel (Yiddish: דער געבאט פון דער שעה - ענדערן די פאליטיק פון מדינת ישראל), 1955.
- Two Years Since the June 1967 War (1969)

=== Selected Articles ===
- After the Liquidated Balfour Declaration in Palestine, The Communist (August 1939)
- Arab-Jewish Unity for the Solution of Palestine's Problems, Political Affairs (June 1946)
- Hypocrisy of the Palestine Report, Daily Worker (June 7, 1946)
- The Palestine Report: Conclusion, Daily Worker (June 8, 1946)
- On U.N Resolution about Zionism, The African Communist (1976)
- Leave Lebanon Immediately! Stop the Murder and Destruction!, Jewish Affairs - CPUSA (July-August 1982)
- The Israeli Terrorists and Their Abettors, Jewish Affairs - CPUSA (May-June 1984)
- Anti-Fascist Unity Key in Israel, Jewish Affairs - CPUSA (July-August 1984)
- Israel After the Election, Jewish Affairs - CPUSA (March-April 1985)

== Distinctions ==
Ribbon bar	Country	Honour
	Soviet Union	Order of Friendship of Peoples
