= Maki (political party) =

Communist Party of Israel הַמִפְלָגָה הַקוֹמוּנִיסְטִית הַיִשְׂרְאֵלִית الحزب الشيوعي الاسرائيلي
- General Secretary: Adel Amer
- Leadership: Central committee
- Founded: 1 September 1965 (as Rakah)
- Split from: Maki (1948)
- Headquarters: Nazareth, Tel Aviv
- Newspaper: Arabic: Al-Ittihad; Hebrew: Zo HaDerekh
- Youth wing: Young Communist League of Israel
- Ideology: Communism; Anti-Zionism; Marxism-Leninism
- Political position: Far-left
- National affiliation: Hadash
- International affiliation: IMCWP
- Colours: Red
- Knesset: 2 / 120

Election symbol
- ו

Website
- maki.org.il

The Communist Party of Israel, (Note: Hebrew: הַמִפְלָגָה הַקוֹמוּנִיסְטִית הַיִשְׂרְאֵלִית, romanized: HaMiflaga HaKomunistit HaYisraelit; Arabic: الحزب الشيوعي الاسرائيلي, romanized: Al-Hizb al-Shuyueiu al-Asrayiyliu) commonly known by its Hebrew abbreviation Maki (מִקִ״י), is a communist party in Israel that forms part of the Hadash political alliance. It was founded in 1965 as the New Communist List, (Note: Hebrew: רשימה קומוניסטית חדשה, romanized: Reshima Komunistit Hadasha; Arabic: القائمة الشيوعية الجديدة, romanized: Al-Qayimat al-Shuyueiat al-Jadida) or Rakah (רק״ח), by an anti-Zionist faction of the original Maki.

== History ==
Rakah was formed on 1 September 1965 due to internal disagreements in the original Maki, which was split between a largely Jewish and Zionist faction led by Moshe Sneh and Shmuel Mikunis that was critical of the Soviet Union's anti-Zionist stance, and a largely Arab faction that continued the party's anti-Zionist historical line led by Vilner, Toubi and Habibi.

As a result, the Anti-Zionist faction (including Emile Habibi, Tawfik Toubi and Meir Vilner) left Maki to form a new party, Rakah, which the Soviet Union eventually recognised as the "official" communist party in Israel. Shlomo Sand and Mahmoud Darwish were also Rakah activists.

The Zionist faction, led by Sneh, retained the name Maki. It was reported in the Soviet media that the Mikunis–Sneh group defected to the bourgeois-nationalist camp.

The 1965 Israeli legislative election saw Rakah party win three seats, comprehensively beating Maki as it slumped to just one. Rakah's opposition to Zionism and the Six-Day War meant that they were excluded from the national unity governments of the sixth Knesset. In the 1969 Israeli legislative election Rakah again won three seats. During the 1973 Israeli legislative election Rakah saw a rise in support as the party picked up four seats.

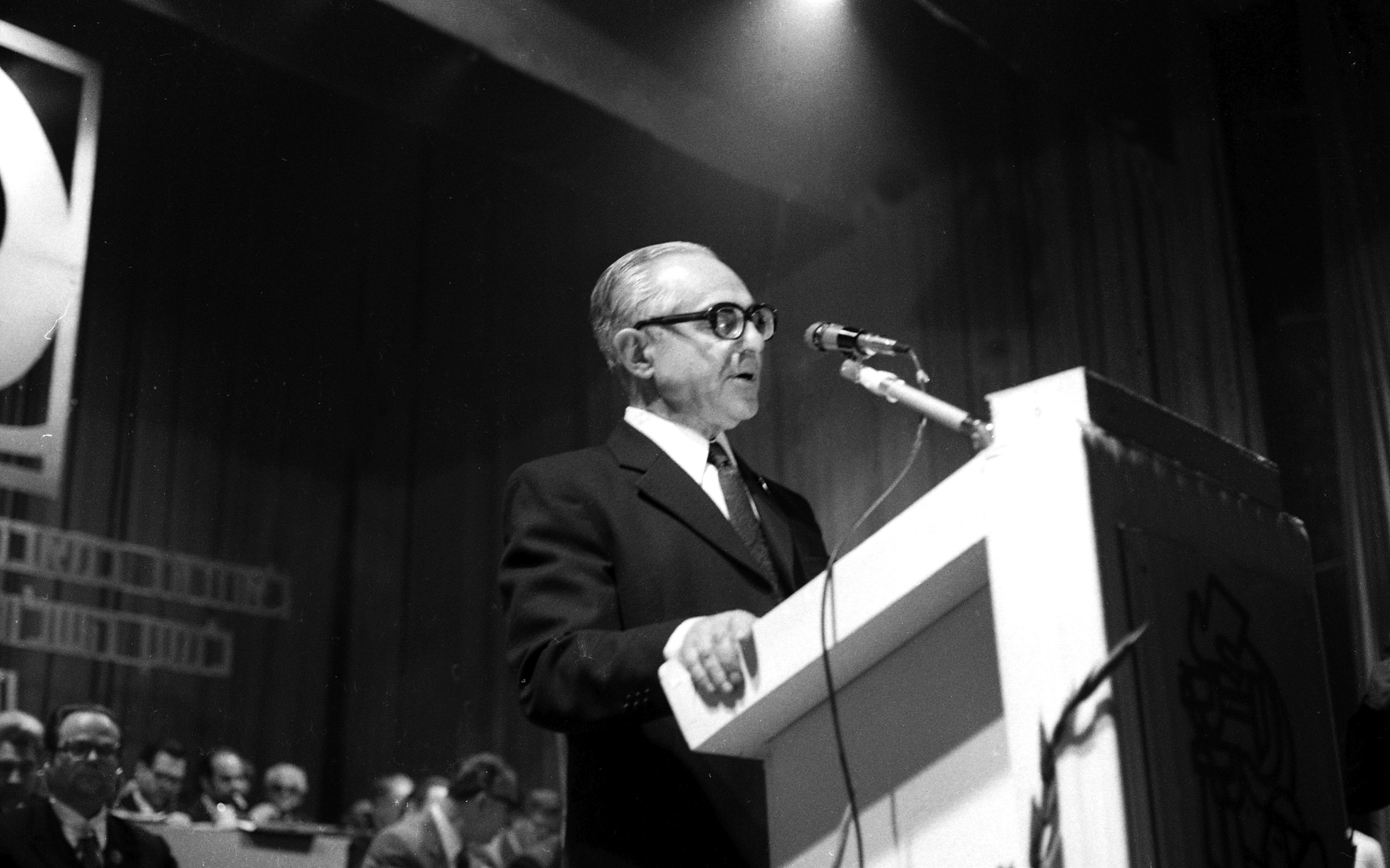
Meir Vilner addresses Rakah's 1976 convention

Preceding the 1977 elections the party decided to form the political coalition Hadash with some other small left-wing and Arab organizations, including some members of the Israeli Black Panthers, prominent public figures and Arab Mayors. After the original Maki had disappeared after merging into Ratz in 1981, members of Rakah decided to reclaim the party's name to Maki in 1989. The party remains the leading force in Hadash, and publishes the Al-Ittihad and Zo HaDerekh newspapers.

== Ideology and positions ==
=== Communism and anti-Zionism ===
Maki is an anti-Zionist communist party. Organizationally, the party operates on the principle of democratic centralism, which it describes as a fusion of central policy execution and inner-party democracy.

The party defines itself as a revolutionary working-class movement aiming for a transition from capitalism to socialism. According to its constitution, Maki views late capitalism, globalization, and American imperialism as the root causes of global environmental destruction, social injustice, and the erosion of workers' rights.It envisions socialism not as a static system, but as a dynamically developing, humanistic society featuring working-class rule, social ownership of major production means, democratic economic planning, and political pluralism.

=== Attitude to Marxism-Leninism ===
As a Marxist-Leninist party, Maki officially acknowledges both the achievements and the historical failures of the 20th-century communist movement, stating that the party must learn from past mistakes without abandoning the pursuit of fundamental revolutionary change. In its constitution, the party proclaims its goal as "socialism — a humane, democratic society founded on social justice" and cites "Lenin's revolutionary path."

Despite the term Marxism-Leninism in self-identification, Maki is not a Stalinist party. As +972 Magazine writes, "Like all communist parties, it apologized for the crimes of Stalinism and adopted an undemocratic organizational structure." More to it, Dov Khenin, one of the leader of the party, said in an interview in 2013: "Other elements, however, should be left behind—above all, every aspect of Stalinism, whether in theory or in practice. [...] These points reinforce the need to re-establish the Left—by clearly distancing it from both Stalinism and social democracy." He has been consistent in this position, and in a 1991 text which he republished on his blog later, and in which he cited such figures as György Lukács, he wrote: "I find the basic demarcation articulated by the French Communists to be quite apt: "Neither Social Democracy nor Stalinism. [...] Indeed, Stalinism is "a monstrous distortion of socialism, of Marxism, of the role of the Party, and of its very essence" (resolutions of the 27th Congress of the French Communists). At the core of the Stalinist model lay a rigid, centralized, bureaucratic apparatus for managing economic and political life. [...] At the heart of this system, Slovo identifies the notion that, in principle, "socialism without democracy" is possible. This is the inner core of Stalinism: the positioning of democracy as something "external" to socialism—something socialism could, in theory, do without." Still, as +972 writes, since 1989, "the party has struggled to overcome the legacy of its uncritical pro-Sovietism and the undemocratic elements in its political culture", one of them being campism: in 2011, prominent party leaders suggested supporting the suppression of anti-Assad protests in Ba'athist Syria, while in 2022, the party "refused to oppose Russia’s 2022 invasion of Ukraine and support the Ukrainian people's right to self-determination." Stalinism is also one of such elements: Mohamed Nafa, at the time the general secretary of the party, proclaimed his support to the Assad regime in Syria and attacked Khruschev's speech against Stalin and defending the latter up to defending the authenticity of the "Doctors' plot" in the Arabic newspaper of the party in 2011. Sources note that the party has contradictory tendencies while such figures as Khenin represent a "image of a modern, open-minded leftist party committed to democracy and human rights," other "cadres" support Bashar al-Assad and "virulent" Arab nationalism. Joel Beinin mentioned that Khenin represented "the current in the party that wanted to break with all of that the pro-Sovietism and many other things as well" before retiring from politics.

=== Anti-Zionism and Jewish-Arab partnership ===
Maki states that it "swims against the current" of both Jewish and Arab nationalism. It officially rejects Zionism, arguing that Zionist ideology and practices generate racism and undermine democracy and equality. The party similarly rejects what it terms "Arab reaction," emphasizing an internationalist, class-based division of society over national divisions.

Maki includes both Jewish people and Arabs. Acknowledging its historical role in shaping the political and cultural identity of the Palestinian Arab minority in Israel, the party's platform also highlights the strategic challenge of achieving a political breakthrough among the Jewish public. To build a broader coalition around these goals, Maki initiated the creation of the Hadash alliance in 1977, aiming to unite various left-wing and environmental groups around an agreed-upon minimum program of peace, social equality, and environmental justice.

=== Israeli-Palestinian conflict and foreign policy ===
Historically, the party states it was the first in Israel to propose a two-state solution. It advocates for a just, comprehensive, and stable Israeli-Palestinian peace centered on ending the Israeli occupation and establishing an independent Palestinian state with East Jerusalem as its capital, alongside the State of Israel with West Jerusalem as its capital. It also calls for a resolution to the Palestinian refugee problem in accordance with United Nations resolutions.

Maki advocates for the transformation of Israel into a secular, multiethnic state. In an interview with the American socialist magazine Jacobin on 17 November 2023, Eli Gozansky, a Jewish member of the party leadership, opined on whether the creation of one binational state was possible:

In theory yes, but in reality no. For several important reasons: The first is that the Palestinian people want and have the right to independence. Second, mutual disbelief [in the possibility of one binational state] is enormous, certainly even more so after the latest massacres involving the two nations. Third, Israel is much stronger economically, so if the single state is established now, without a phase of independence for the Palestinians, apartheid and Jewish economic control will be perpetuated. In the future, after both countries exist in peace and prosperity, this solution is a possibility.

Furthermore, the party is staunchly anti-militarist. It supports the right to conscientious objectionand calls for the regional disarmament of weapons of mass destruction, urging Israel to sign the Treaty on the Non-Proliferation of Nuclear Weapons.

=== Domestic and social policies ===
Domestically, Maki's platform calls for the recognition of Arab citizens of Israel as a national minority and demands full civic and national equality, including an egalitarian citizenship law. It actively campaigns for workers' rights, the rights of foreign workers, and the protection of children and youth.

The party also emphasizes intersectional social struggles, advocating for full women's rights and an end to gender-based violence, as well as equality for Mizrahi communities. Maki supports the complete separation of religion and state, advocating for freedom of conscience, the abolition of religious coercion, and the right to freely choose between secular and religious lifestyles.

== Leadership ==
In accordance with the principle of democratic centralism, the party is collectively led by its Central Committee and Politburo. Within this structure, the highest operational position is the General Secretary (also referred to as the Secretary General). From its formation as Rakah in 1965 until 1990, the party was led by Meir Vilner. In 1990, Tawfik Toubi succeeded him, becoming the party's first Arab General Secretary. Since June 2015, the position has been held by the incumbent General Secretary, Adel Amer.

=== List of General Secretaries ===
No.	Portrait	Name	Term	Notes
1	Portrait of Meir Vilner	Meir Vilner	1 September 1965 – 21 May 1990	Led the party from its split as Rakah (codified during the 15th Congress in 1965) until its renaming to Maki in 1989. Retained leadership until his retirement at the 21st Congress in 1990.
2	Portrait of Tawfik Toubi	Tawfik Toubi	21 May 1990 – 28 January 1993	Succeeded Vilner during the 21st Congress, becoming the first Arab General Secretary of the party. He led until the 22nd Congress.
3	Portrait of Muhammad Nafa'	Mohamed Nafa	1993 – 2002	First term. Elected following the 22nd Congress and served until the 24th Congress.
4	Portrait of Issam Makhoul	Issam Makhoul	2002 – 2007	Elected at the 24th Congress in late 2002. Served concurrently as Maki's representative in the Knesset during the beginning of his tenure, stepping down at the 25th Congress.
(3)	Portrait of Muhammad Nafa	Mohamed Nafa	2007 – June 2015	Second term. Re-elected at the 25th Congress in 2007, and again during the 26th Congress in 2012.
5	Portrait of Adel Amer	Adel Amer	June 2015 – Incumbent	First elected in June 2015 at the 27th Congress, and subsequently re-elected by the Central Committee following the 28th Congress, and again after the 29th Congress in 2026.

== Election results ==
Election	Lead candidate	Votes	%	Position	Seats	+ / –	Status
1965	Meir Vilner	27,413	2.27	New	3 / 120	▲3	Opposition
1969	Meir Vilner	38,827	2.84	▲7th	3 / 120	Steady	Opposition
1973	Meir Vilner	53,353	3.41	▲6th	4 / 120	▲1	Opposition
1977	Meir Vilner	Part of Hadash		▲5th	4 / 120	Steady	Opposition
1981	Meir Vilner	Part of Hadash		5th	3 / 120	▼1	Opposition
1984	Meir Vilner	Part of Hadash		5th	3 / 120	Steady	Opposition
1988	Meir Vilner	Part of Hadash		▼7th	3 / 120	Steady	Opposition
1992	Tawfiq Ziad	Part of Hadash		▼8th	2 / 120	▼1	Support
1996	Ahmad Sa'd	Part of Hadash–Balad		▲7th	2 / 120	Steady	Opposition
1999	Mohammad Barakeh	Part of Hadash		▼12th	3 / 120	▲1	Opposition
2003	Mohammad Barakeh	Part of Hadash–Ta'al		▲9th	2 / 120	▼1	Opposition
2006	Mohammad Barakeh	Part of Hadash		▼11th	2 / 120	Steady	Opposition
2009	Mohammad Barakeh	Part of Hadash		▲9th	3 / 120	▲1	Opposition
2013	Mohammad Barakeh	Part of Hadash		▼10th	3 / 120	Steady	Opposition
2015	Aida Touma-Suleiman	Part of the Joint List		▲3rd	4 / 120	▲1	Opposition
April 2019	Aida Touma-Suleiman	Part of Hadash–Ta'al		▼5th	3 / 120	▼1	Opposition
September 2019	Aida Touma-Suleiman	Part of the Joint List		▲3rd	4 / 120	▲1	Opposition
2020	Aida Touma-Suleiman	Part of the Joint List		3rd	4 / 120	Steady	Opposition
2021	Aida Touma-Suleiman	Part of the Joint List		▼10th	2 / 120	▼2	Opposition
2022	Aida Touma-Suleiman	Part of Hadash–Ta'al		▼12th	2 / 120	Steady	Opposition
2026	Aida Touma-Suleiman	Part of the Joint List					

== Gallery ==
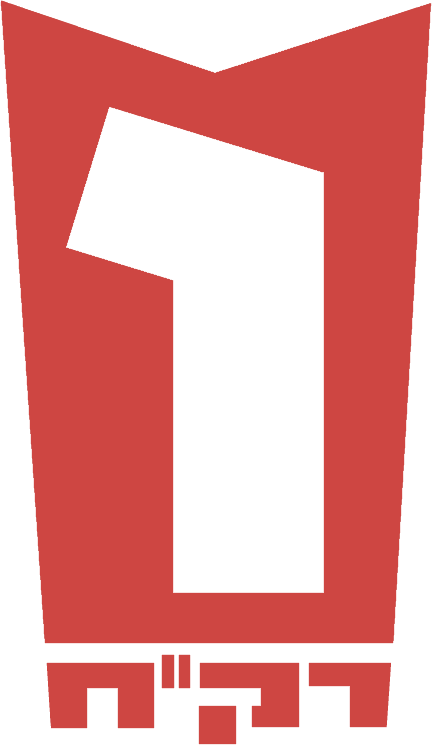
Logo of Rakah in 1965

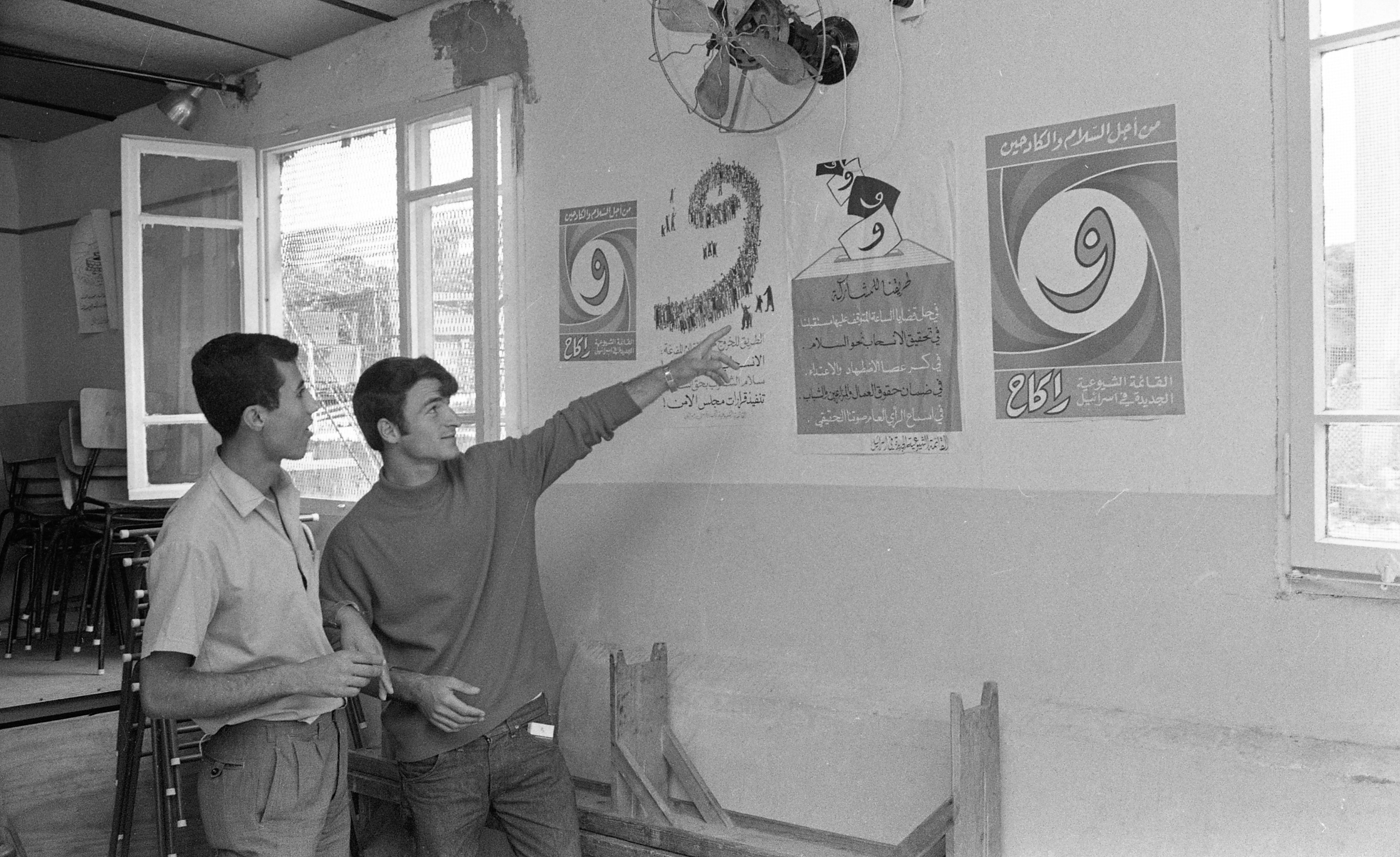
Rakah members in 1969
