= Tawfik Toubi =

Israeli Arab politician (1922–2011)

- توفيق طوبي
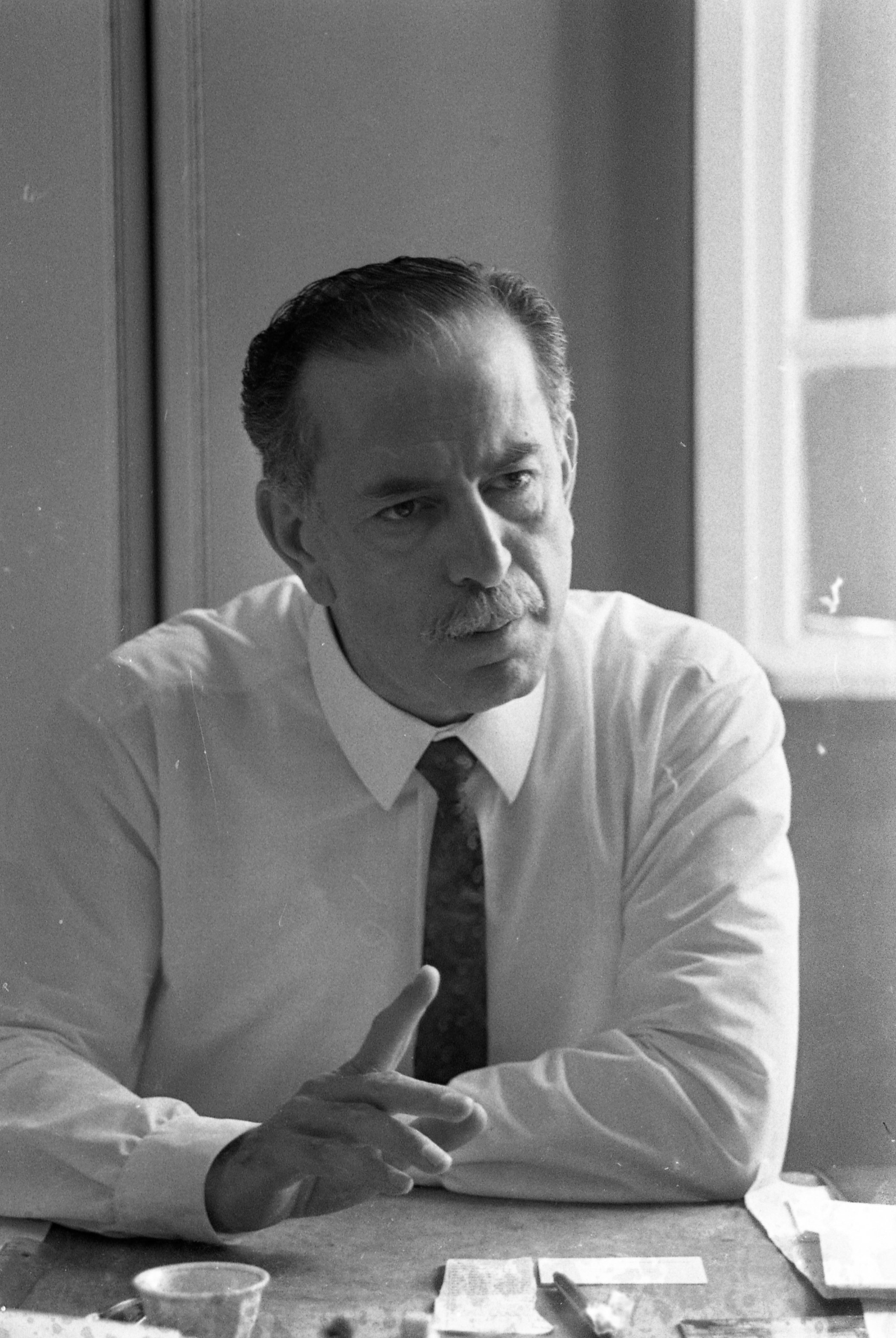
- Toubi in 1969

General Secretary of the Communist Party of Israel
- In office 21 May 1990 – 28 January 1993
- Preceded by: Meir Vilner
- Succeeded by: Mohamed Nafa

Faction represented in the Knesset
- 1949–1965: Maki
- 1965–1977: Rakah
- 1977–1990: Hadash

Personal details
- Born: 11 May 1922 Haifa, Mandatory Palestine
- Died: 12 March 2011 (aged 88) Haifa, Israel
- Resting place: Kfar Samir Cemetery
- Spouse: Olga Touma
- Children: Elias

Tawfik Toubi (Arabic: توفيق طوبي, Hebrew: תופיק טובי; 11 May 1922 – 12 March 2011) was a Mandatory Palestine-born Israeli Arab communist politician. He was the last surviving member of the first Knesset. He is also the second longest-serving Knesset member of all time, over 41 years of office, all consecutive.

== Biography ==
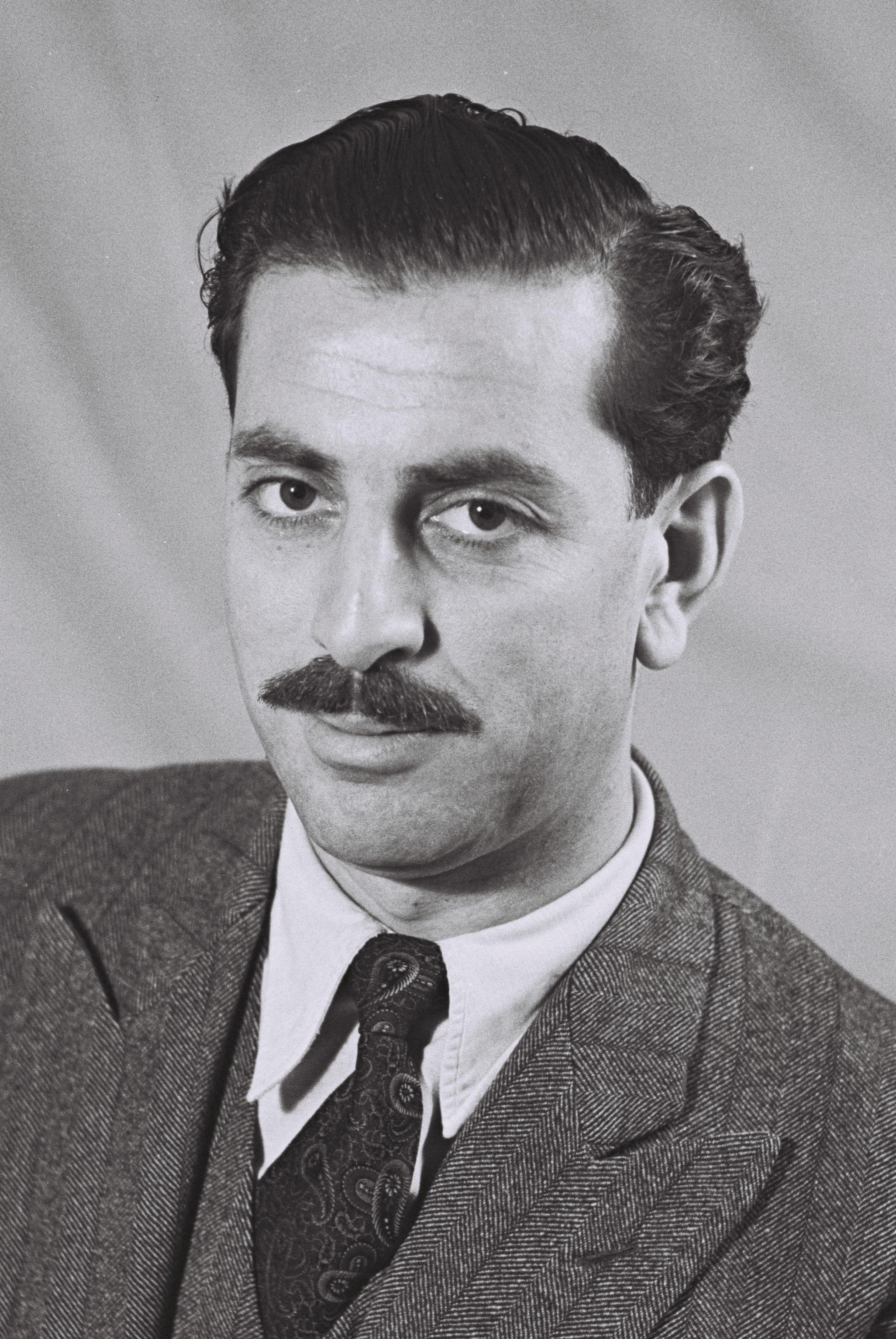
Toubi's official Knesset portrait, 1951

Toubi was born in Haifa to an Arab Orthodox family in 1922, the son of Elias and Alice (née Khoury), and was educated at the Mount Zion School in Jerusalem. He joined the Palestine Communist Party in 1941 and later was one of the founders of the National Liberation League in Palestine, which originally opposed partition of Palestine but later came to accept it, after the Soviet Union indicated that it would support partition.

He was elected to the Knesset in Israel's first elections in 1949 as a member of Maki. He was re-elected in 1951, 1955, 1959 and 1961. In 1965 he was involved in a breakaway from Maki to form Rakah, and was voted back into the Knesset on the new party's list later in the same year. In 1976, he was elected deputy secretary general of the new Hadash party, an alliance of Rakah and several other smaller left-wing and Israeli Arab parties. He served as Hadash's secretary-general from 1989 to 1993, and was elected to the Knesset on Hadash's list in 1977, 1981, 1984 and 1988, before resigning from the Knesset in July 1990 and being replaced by Tamar Gozansky. Toubi was also publisher and editor of Arab language Communist paper Al Ittihad. He retired from the Knesset in 1990 after a 41-year tenure, and died on 12 March 2011, at the age of 88.

== Personal life ==
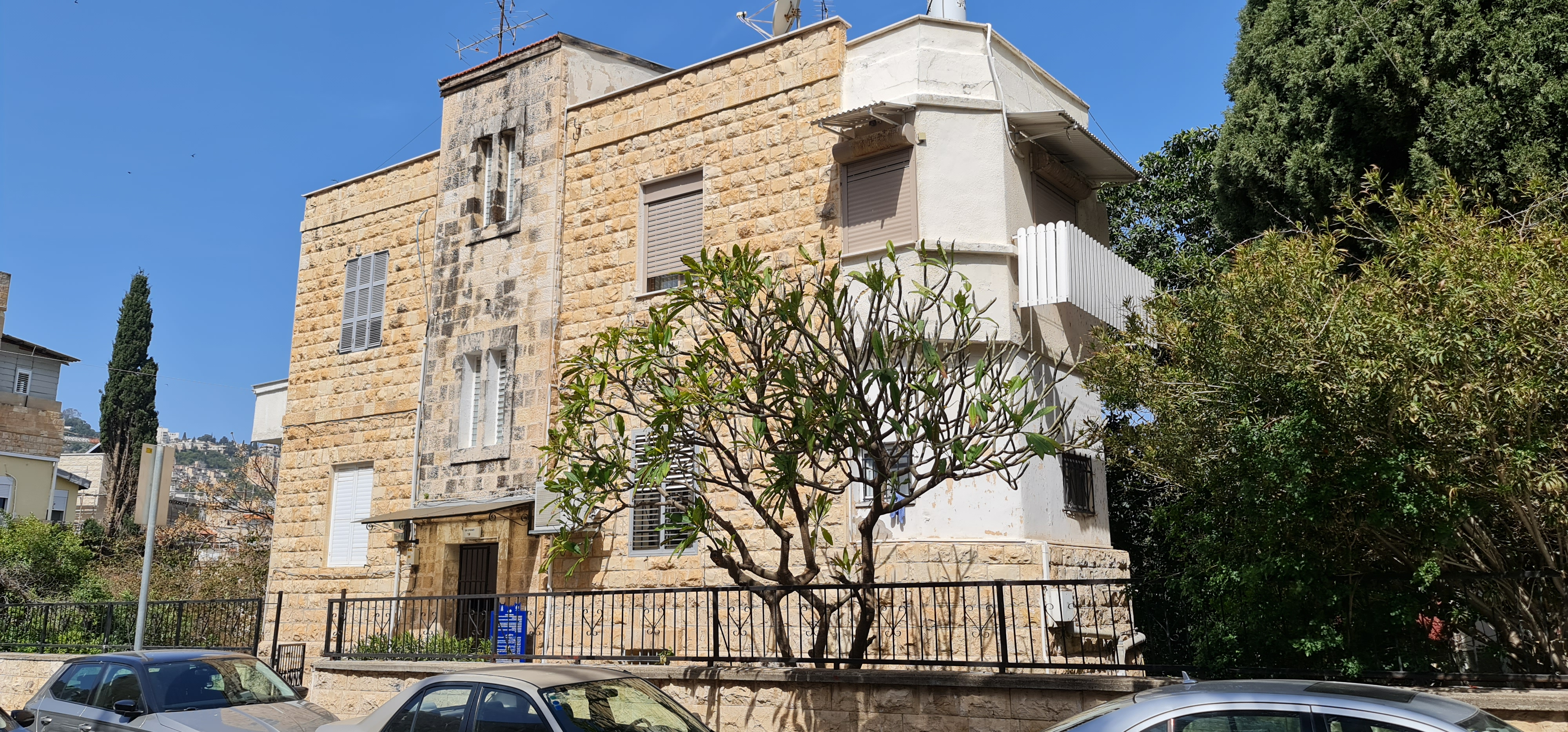
Toubi's house in Haifa, 2022

Toubi was married to Olga Touma with whom he had one son, Elias Toubi. Elias studied medicine in Leningrad and today is a professor of medicine, serving as director of the Department of Immunology and Clinical Allergy at Bnei Zion Medical Center and director of the Italian Hospital in Haifa.

== Legacy ==
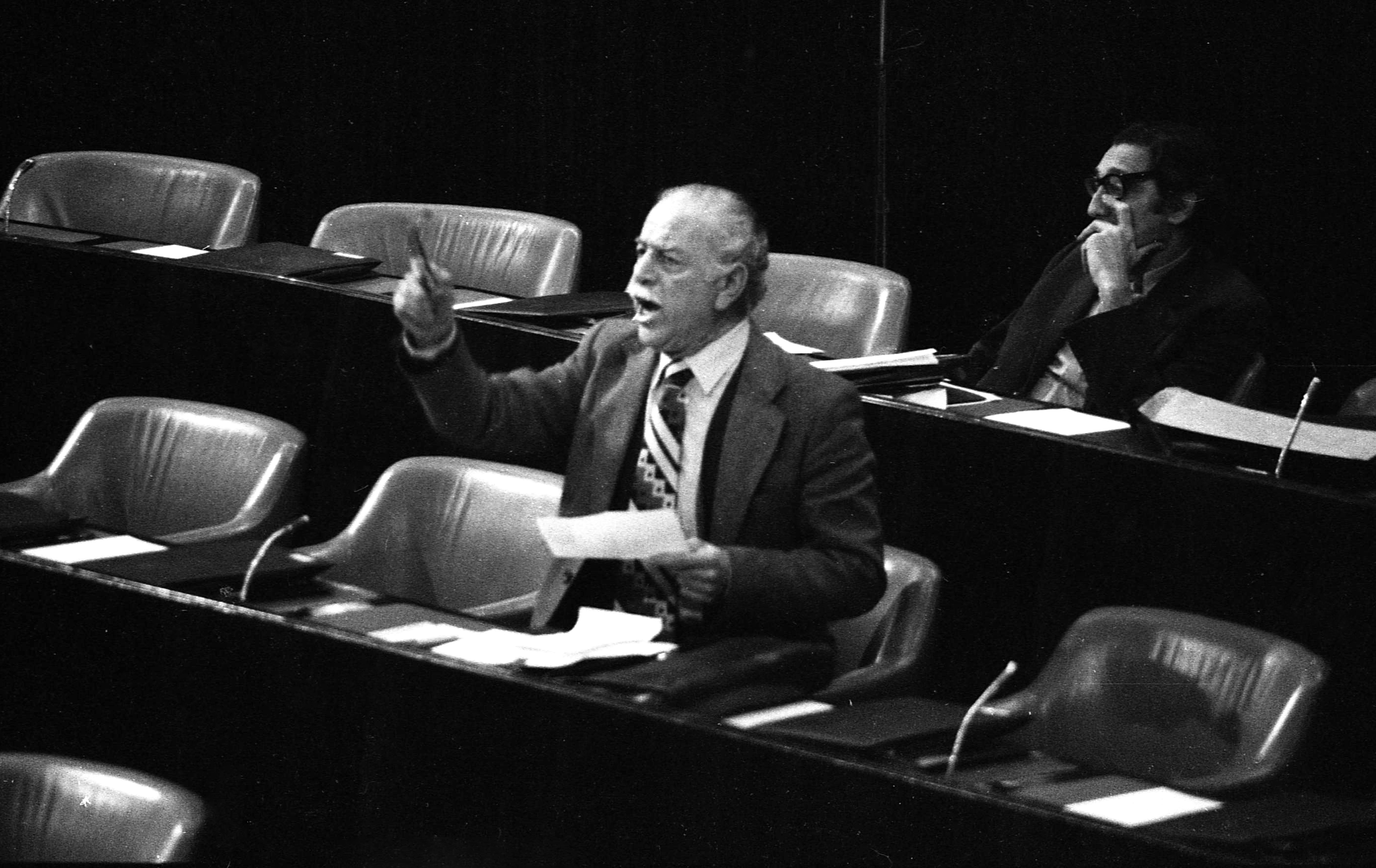
Toubi gives a speech to the Knesset, January 6, 1983

Toubi is remembered as one of the two Knesset members, alongside Meir Vilner, who helped expose the Kafr Qasim massacre after visiting the village during the curfew, despite a government censorship order that initially barred publication of the events. He is regarded as the first MK to bring up the "state of all its citizens" formula when the Knesset debated the Basic Law in 1985. The phrase also appears in the Meretz platform. Some of his right-wing opponents reportedly regretted his retirement in 1990, suggesting he was a respected adversary in the Knesset, in contrast to later Arab MKs such as Azmi Bishara.

In 1949, Israeli poet Nathan Alterman wrote:

Who is Tawfik Tubi? A Knesset member,
a Communist, an Arab who sits
in that House by full right...
That's democracy, not always easy,
but if we don't understand this part,
we haven't gotten anything at all.

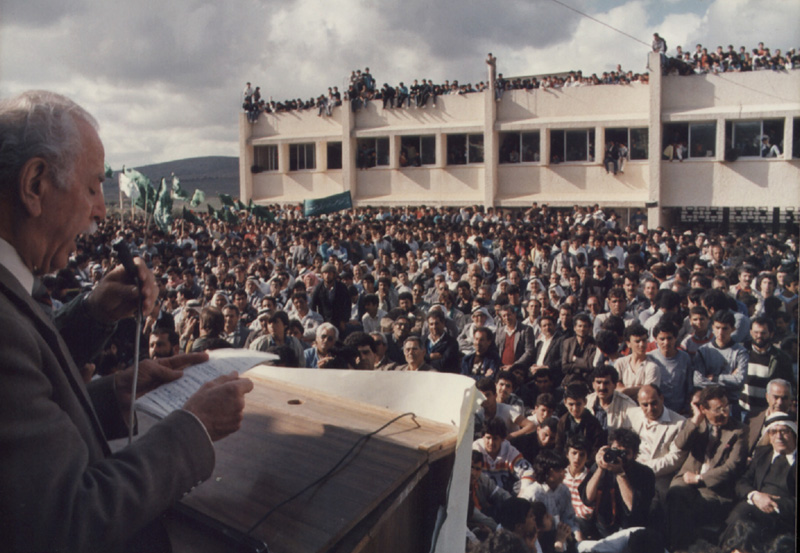
Toubi gives a speech at a public rally in Sakhnin marking Land Day, 1988

Toubi raised the issue of the right of return for Palestinian refugees on at least two occasions in the Knesset. After the 1948 Arab-Israeli War, he demanded that the inhabitants of al-Birwa be allowed to return to their homes, a request refused by David Ben-Gurion. After the 1967 war, he requested from Moshe Dayan that the inhabitants of Yalo be allowed to return to their homes, but it too was denied. In 2012, the discourses and articles of Tawfik Toubi were published in Israel by his wife Olga and his son Elias. Tawfik Toubi is accepted, honored and rewarded by the Israeli establishment.

In 2011, Knesset Speaker Reuven Rivlin said:

Toubi was a valued and impressive parliamentarian that left his mark on the Israeli parliament. He was a member of a confronting movement but nevertheless insisted on respecting the rules of the game and knew how to apply them to himself in practice.

== Distinctions ==
Ribbon bar	Country	Honour
	Soviet Union	Order of Friendship of Peoples

== Bibliography ==
- Karmi, Ghada (1999). The Palestinian Exodus, 1948–1998. University of London, Centre of Islamic and Middle Eastern Law. Garnet & Ithaca Press. ISBN 0-86372-244-X.
- Kacowicz, Arie Marcelo; Lutomski, Pawel (2007). Population Resettlement in International Conflicts: A Comparative Study. Lexington Books. ISBN 9780739116074.
