= List of Israeli politicians =

The following is a list of Israeli politicians who are notable enough for Wikipedia articles.

== A ==
- Sally Abed, member of Haifa City Council (2024- ), leader in the Standing Together movement
- Abdullah Abu Ma'aruf, former MK representing Hadash, physician
- Sami Abu Shehadeh, former MK and leader of the Balad party
- Aharon Abuhatzera, former minister, head of the National Religious Party
- Afu Agbaria, former MK representing Hadash, physician
- Yosef Almogi, former minister and mayor of Haifa
- Yigal Allon, former general, government minister
- Shulamit Aloni, founder of Human Rights party, former minister in 1974, 1992–1996
- Meir Amit, former general, minister, head of Mossad
- Yehuda Amital, Rabbi, former minister without portfolio, leader of Meimad
- Shaul Amor, former minister, candidate for presidency
- Zalman Aran, former minister
- Shoshana Arbeli-Almozlino, former health minister
- Moshe Arens, former minister of defense, former ambassador to the U.S.
- Yoram Aridor, former minister
- Jabar Asakla, former MK representing the Joint List
- Youssef Atauna, former MK representing Hadash
- Colette Avital, Israeli diplomat, former member of Knesset
- Shmuel Avital, former minister
- Ruhama Avraham, former MK
- Rachel Azaria, Deputy Mayor of Jerusalem

== B ==
- Haim Bar-Lev, former Chief of Staff, minister, ambassador to Russia
- Yisrael Bar-Yehuda (1895–1965), former minister, divorced from Beba Idelson
- Ehud Barak (b. 1942), former chief of staff, Israeli Prime Minister 1999–2001
- Mohammad Barakeh, former MK and leader of Hadash
- Moshe Baram, former minister
- Uzi Baram, former minister, son of Moshe Baram
- Nir Barkat, mayor of Jerusalem
- Yisrael Barzilai, former minister
- Rostam Bastuni, former MK representing Mapam, first Arab citizen to represent a Zionist party in the Knesset
- Benny Begin, former minister, son of Prime Minister Menachem Begin
- Menachem Begin (1913–1992), former head of Irgun, Prime Minister 1977–1983, Nobel Peace Prize 1978
- Yossi Beilin, former Labor party minister, leader of Meretz-Yachad
- Yitzhak Ben-Aharon (1906–2006), former minister, former Histadrut leader
- Shlomo Ben-Ami, former foreign affairs minister, ambassador, professor
- Binyamin Ben-Eliezer, former defense minister
- David Ben-Gurion (1886–1973), founder of Israel, first Prime Minister of Israel 1948–1953, 1954–1963
- Mordechai Ben-Porat, former minister without portfolio
- Yitzhak Ben-Zvi, second President of Israel
- Shlomo Benizri, former minister
- Naftali Bennett, minister of education, leader of The Jewish Home, thirteenth Prime Minister of Israel 2021-present
- Mordechai Bentov, first minister of construction and housing
- Yitzhak Berman, former minister, former Speaker of Knesset
- Peretz Bernstein, former minister
- Azmi Bishara, Arab-Israeli MP & head of Balad party
- Charlie Biton, former MK representing Hadash, founder of the Israeli Black Panthers
- Victor Breilovsky, was minister of science and technology for 4 days
- Yosef Burg, Rabbi, former minister, leader of the National Religious Party

== C ==
- Moshe Carmel, former party leader and army commander, former transportation minister
- Ofer Cassif, MK representing Hadash
- Naomi Chazan, former MK, representing Meretz, human rights activist
- Haim Cohn, former Attorney General, former justice minister, former Supreme Court justice, former State Attorney
- Geula Cohen, former deputy minister, founder of Tehyia party
- Raanan Cohen, former minister of labour
- Rachel Cohen-Kagan, chairman of WIZO, signed declaration of independence, MK
- Ran Cohen, Knesset member for Meretz-Yachad, former minister of industry and commerce
- Yitzhak Cohen, former minister, from Shas party
- Yigal Cohen-Orgad, former minister
- Ruth Colian, founder and head of the U'Bizchutan party
- Haim Corfu, former minister

== D ==
- Nissim Dahan, former health minister
- Moshe Dayan, former chief of staff, defense and foreign minister
- Yael Dayan, former Knesset member, active feminist, deputy mayor of Tel Aviv
- Aryeh Deri, former minister, leader of Shas party
- Ben-Zion Dinur, former minister of education, professor
- Sara Doron, former minister without portfolio
- Aryeh Leib Dulchin, former minister, former chairman of Jewish Agency

== E ==
- Abba Eban (1915–2002), diplomat and Foreign Minister of Israel 1966–1974
- Yuli-Yoel Edelstein, former minister of immigrant absorption
- Rafael Edri, former minister
- Simha Ehrlich, former finance minister
- Effi Eitam, Israeli general, leader of the Renewed Religious National Zionist party, former minister
- Michael Eitan, former minister of Science and Technology
- Rafael Eitan (1929–2004), former Chief of Staff, former minister
- Binyamin Elon, former minister, leader of Moledet party
- Tamar Eshel, Israeli representative in several UN organizations, member of Knesset
- Levi Eshkol, former Prime Minister of Israel 1963–1969
- Gideon Ezra, former minister

== F ==
- Moshe Feiglin, Israeli politician and activist, and the leader of libertarian Zionist party Zehut
- Shmuel Flatto-Sharon, MK 8th Knesset 1977-81
- Issawi Frej, former minister of regional cooperation, MK representing Meretz

== G ==
- Yisrael Galili (1911–1986), former minister
- Zehava Gal-On, former MK and leader of Meretz
- Gila Gamliel, minister of senior citizens
- Benny Gantz, former Alternate Prime Minister of Israel, former minister of Defense and former Chief of General Staff, leader of National Unity.
- Inbal Gavriely, youngest person elected to Knesset
- Yaakov Geri, former Minister of Industry and Commerce
- Yael German, former MK representing Yesh Atid
- Basel Ghattas, former MK representing Balad
- Akiva Govrin, former minister of Tourism
- Tamar Gozansky, former MK, leader in The Communist Party of Israel
- Yitzhak Gruenbaum, first Minister of Interior
- Haika Grossman, member of Knesset, first woman to head of a regional council
- Pesach Grupper, former Minister of Agriculture
- Mordechai Gur, former Chief of Staff, former minister
- Haim Gvati, former minister

== H ==
- Emile Habibi, former MK representing Maki, renowned author
- Zevulun Hammer, former minister, leader of National Religious Party
- Tzachi Hanegbi, member of government. Son of Geula Cohen
- Michael Harish, former minister of industry and commerce
- Gideon Hausner, former justice minister, attorney at the Eichmann trial
- Yaakov Michael Hazani, former minister
- Chaim Herzog, former general and diplomat, sixth President of Israel, born Vivian Herzog in Belfast, UK
- Isaac Herzog, member of government, son of President Chaim Herzog
- Shlomo Hillel, former minister, former Speaker of Knesset
- Nitzan Horowitz, former minister of health and leader of Meretz
- Tzipi Hotovely, viceminister of foreign affairs
- Yigal Hurvitz, former finance minister
- Abba Hushi (1898–1969), politician and mayor of Haifa 1951–1969

== I ==
- Beba Idelson, leader of the Pioneer Women movement. Member of Knesset
- Feige Ilanit, member of first Knesset, mother of Uri Ilan
- Dalia Itzik, member of the government

== J ==
- Hussniya Jabara, former MK representing Meretz, the first female Arab member of the Knesset
- Yousef Jabareen, former MK representing Hadash, academic and lawyer
- Ramiz Jaraisy, former longtime mayor of Nazareth representing Hadash

== K ==
- Avigdor Kahalani, former minister of internal security 1996–1999, general
- Meir Kahane, founder of the Kach party (subsequently banned) (assassinated)
- Moshe Kahlon, minister of finance, leader of Kulanu
- Eliezer Kaplan, first finance minister
- Moshe Katsav (b. 1945), former President of Israel (2000–2007)
- Yisrael Katz, former minister of labour (1974–1977)
- Yisrael Katz, minister of agriculture since 2003, of Likud party
- Berl Katznelson
- Avraham Katz-Oz, former minister of agriculture
- Yisrael Kessar, former Histadrut leader, minister of transportation
- Dov Khenin, former MK representing Hadash
- Michael Kleiner, leader of Herut
- Moshe Kol, former minister

== L ==
- Haim Landau, former minister
- Uzi Landau, former minister. Son of Haim Landau
- Tommy Lapid, former minister of justice (2003–2004) and leader of Shinui party, Holocaust survivor
- Yair Lapid, former minister of finance, leader of Yesh Atid, son of Tommy Lapid
- Zipora Laskov, founder of public medicine in Israel, elected to third Knesset
- Aliza Lavie, MK
- Pinhas Lavon, former defense minister
- Avraham Levenbraun, former MK representing Maki and Hadash
- Shalom Levin, former Sec. Gen and President of Israel Teachers union and former Knesset member
- Yitzhak-Meir Levin, former welfare minister
- David Levy, former foreign minister
- Yitzhak Levy, former minister, leader of Renewed Religious National Zionist party
- Amnon Linn, politician and former Knesset member.
- Zita Linker, founder of liberal party, member of Knesset
- David Libai, former justice minister
- Avigdor Lieberman, former minister
- Amnon Lipkin-Shahak, former Chief of Staff, former tourism minister
- Limor Livnat, member of Knesset, former minister
- Tzipi Livni, Foreign Minister, First Vice Prime Minister (Acting Prime Minister). Daughter of Eitan Livni
- Kadish Luz, former minister, former Speaker of Knesset

== M ==
- David Magen, former minister
- Hashem Mahameed, former MK representing Hadash, Ra'am and Balad, former mayor of Umm al-Fahm
- Ada Maimon, former member of Knesset, pioneer of women's rights, sister of Yehuda Leib Maimon
- Yehuda Leib Maimon, first minister of religious affairs
- Issam Makhoul, former MK representing Hadash, first MK to explicitly discuss Israel's nuclear program in the Knesset
- Anat Maor, former MK for Meretz 1992–2003
- Yehoshua Matza, former health minister, today Bonds president
- Golda Meir (1898–1978), Prime Minister of Israel 1969–1974
- Michael Melchior, former minister, Chief Rabbi of Denmark and Norway
- Dan Meridor, former finance and justice minister
- Yaakov Meridor, former minister.
- Shmuel Mikunis, former MK, secretary-general of Maki
- Roni Milo, former minister, mayor of Tel Aviv 1993–1998
- Binyamin Mintz, former minister of communications
- Yitzhak Modai (1926–1998), former finance minister
- Shaul Mofaz, Minister of Transport, former Chief of Staff, defense minister
- Shlomo Molla, MK for Kadima and Hatnuah
- Yitzhak Mordechai, former general, defense minister, leader of Center party

== N ==
- Peretz Naftali, former minister
- Mohamed Nafa, former MK representing Hadash, former Secretary General of Maki
- Mordechai Namir, former labour minister, Histadrut leader and mayor of Tel Aviv
- Ora Namir, former minister, widow of Mordechai Namir
- Yehudit Naot (1944–2004), professor, former environment minister
- Dan Naveh, Israeli minister, former Cabinet Secretary
- Yitzhak Navon, Fifth President of Israel, former minister
- Yaakov Neeman, former finance and justice minister
- Yuval Ne'eman, scientist, former minister
- Arie Nehemkin, former agriculture minister
- Benjamin Netanyahu (b. 1949), current Likud Party leader, former minister of finance and Prime Minister of Israel 1996–1999
- Moshe Nissim, former finance and justice minister
- Orit Noked, former deputy minister, MK.
- Mordechai Norok, former communications minister

== O ==
- Ayman Odeh, MK, head of Hadash list, Hadash representative to Haifa City Council 1998–2005
- Avraham Ofer, former construction and housing minister
- Amir Ohana, first openly gay right-wing member of the Knesset
- Asher Ohana, former minister of religious affairs
- Ehud Olmert, former Prime Minister, May 2006–2009
- Zevulun Orlev, former minister of welfare, leader of the National Religious Party
- Haim Oron, former minister of agriculture and rural development

== P ==
- Yosef Paritzky, former minister of infrastructure, Member of Shinui
- Gideon Pat, former minister, former President of Israel Bonds
- Nathan Peled, former Immigrant Absorption minister
- Shimon Peres (1923–2016), Second Vice Prime Minister, May 2006–, former defense and foreign minister, Prime Minister of Israel in 1977, 1984–1986, 1995–1996; Nobel Peace Prize 1994
- Amir Peretz (b. 1952), Defense Minister May 2006–, Histadrut leader 1995–2005, leader of the Am Ehad party from 1997, which later merged into the Labour party (Avoda), elected to lead Avoda in November 2005
- Yitzhak Haim Peretz, Rabbi, former minister, leader of Shas
- Shoshana Persitz, first female MK at the head of a permanent committee
- Ophir Pines-Paz, former Israeli minister
- Rafael Pinhasi, former minister, member of Shas party
- Alon Pinkas, former Consul General of Israel in the United States
- David-Zvi Pinkas, former minister of transportation
- Avraham Poraz, former Interior minister
- Eliezer Preminger, former MK representing Maki and Mapam

== R ==
- Yitzhak Rabin (1922–1995), former chief of staff, Israeli Prime Minister 1974–1977, 1992–1995; assassinated
- Dalia Rabin-Pelossof, former deputy minister. Daughter of Yitzhak Rabin
- Yehoshua Rabinovich, former finance minister and mayor of Tel Aviv
- Yitzhak Rafael, former minister, son-in-law of Yehuda Leib Maimon
- Haim Ramon, former Histadrut leader, minister
- Yoel Razvozov, MK for Yesh Atid
- Miri Regev, minister of sport and culture
- David Remez, former minister of transportation
- Elimelech Shimon Rimalt, former communications minister
- Reuven Rivlin, former communications minister 2001–2003, Speaker of Knesset
- Yisrael Rokach, former interior minister and mayor of Tel Aviv
- Pinchas Rosen, first justice minister
- Shlomo Rosen, minister of immigrant absorption
- Pnina Rosenblum, cosmetics queen and former MP.
- Amnon Rubinstein, former minister, now dean in Law school
- Elyakim Rubinstein, former state attorney general, now supreme court judge

== S ==
- Gideon Sa'ar, Knesset member, former Cabinet Secretary
- Ahmad Sa'd, former MK representing Hadash, former editor of Al-Ittihad
- Saleh Saleem, former MK representing Hadash
- Eliezer Sandberg, former minister
- Tova Sanhedrai, former member of Knesset, first religious woman elected
- Pinchas Sapir, former finance minister
- Yosef Sapir, former minister
- Yossi Sarid, former education minister and Knesset Member for Meretz–Yachad
- Eliahu Sasson, former minister
- Ze'ev Scherf, former minister
- Gonen Segev, former minister of infrastructure
- Yosef Serlin, former minister
- Stav Shaffir, youngest female MK in Israeli history
- Moshe Shahal, former minister
- Ayelet Shaked, minister of justice
- Avner Hai Shaki, former minister
- Ilan Shalgi, former minister from Shinui
- Silvan Shalom, former Israeli minister of finance and foreign affairs
- Yitzhak Shamir (1915–2012), former head of Lehi, Prime Minister of Israel 1983–1984, 1986–1992
- Moshe-Haim Shapira, former minister
- Yaakov Shimshon Shapira, former minister
- Yosef Yisrael Shapira, former minister without portfolio from the National Religious Party
- Natan Sharansky, former Soviet refusenik, head of the Yisrael B'Aliyah party, former minister.
- Moshe Sharett (1894–1965), Prime Minister of Israel 1953–1955
- Avraham Sharir, former justice minister
- Ariel Sharon (1928–2014), former Prime Minister (2002–2006), general, defense minister
- Zalman Shazar, third President of Israel, former Education minister
- Bechor-Shalom Sheetrit, former police minister
- Meir Sheetrit, MK, former Israeli minister, first elected to Knesset in 1981
- Shimon Shetreet, former minister
- Victor Shem-Tov, former health minister, Secretary General of Mapam 1979–1985
- Avraham Shohat, former finance minister, son-in-law of Levi Eshkol
- Eliezer Shostak, former health minister
- Shalom Simhon, former Israeli minister
- Bezalel Smotrich, current finance minister
- Efraim Sneh, former minister, general. Son of Moshe Sneh
- Moshe Sneh (1909–1972), Israeli politician, leader of Hagana
- Eliahu Suissa, former minister, member of Shas party
- Hana Sweid, former MK representing Hadash, former mayor of Eilabun

== T ==
- Yitzhak Tabenkin, former leader of the Kibbutz movement, namesake of Yad Tabenkin in Ramat Efal outside of Tel Aviv
- Shmuel Tamir, former justice minister. Son of Bat-Sheva Katznelson
- Yuli Tamir, former immigrant absorption minister 1999–2001
- Salah Tarif, former minister, first druze in the government
- Ahmad Tibi, MK, leader of Ta'al
- Moshe Yaakov Toledano, former religious affairs minister, chief rabbi of Tel Aviv
- Tawfik Toubi, former MK, longtime leader in Maki and Hadash
- Aida Touma-Suleiman, MK representing Hadash, women's rights activist
- Yair Tzaban, former minister of immigrant absorption 1992–1996, aid to Moshe Sneh
- Aharon Tzizling, former minister
- Yaakov Tzur, former minister

== U ==
- Aharon Uzan, former minister
- Uzi Eilam, ex-director of Israel's Atomic Energy Commission

== V ==
- Esther Vilenska, MK representing Maki
- Matan Vilnai, former minister, general
- Meir Vilner, MK, leader of Maki, and signatory of the Declaration of Independence

== W ==
- Zerah Warhaftig, former minister, leader of National Religious Party
- Chaim Weizmann (1874–1952), leading Zionist and scientist, first President of Israel 1949–1952
- Ezer Weizman, seventh President of Israel, former minister, Air Force commander

== Y ==
- Gad Yaacobi, former minister, ambassador to the United Nations
- Aharon Yadlin, former minister
- Shaul Yahalom, former transportation minister
- Aharon Yariv, former minister, general
- Eli Yishai, MK, former Deputy Prime Minister and leader of the Shas party
- Yisrael Yeshayahu, former minister, former Speaker of Knesset
- Dov Yosef, former minister
- Giora Yoseftal, also known as Giora Josephthal, former minister, husband of Senta Josephtal
- Senetta Yoseftal, also known as Senta Yoseftal and Senta Josephthal, former political activist and member of Knesset

== Z ==
- Jamal Zahalka, former MK, longtime leader of the Balad party and head of the High Follow-Up Committee for Arab Citizens of Israel
- Haim Joseph Zadok, former minister of justice, trade and industry
- Tamar Zandberg, former minister of environmental protection and leader of Meretz
- Rehavam Ze'evi, former general, tourism minister and founder of Moledet (assassinated in October 2001)
- Tawfiq Ziad, former MK representing Maki and Hadash, longtime mayor of Nazareth, and renowned poet
- Mordechai Zipori, former general, minister, member of Irgun
- Haneen Zoabi, MK representing the Balad party
- Abd el-Aziz el-Zoubi, former MK representing Mapam, first non-Jewish member of an Israeli government

== See also ==
- List of Israelis
- List of Knesset members
- List of Likud Knesset Members
- Prime Minister of Israel
- Politics of Israel
- Basic Laws of Israel
- List of political parties in Israel
- List of Knesset speakers
