= 2012 Hadash leadership election =

Hadash leadership election

- 10 November 2012
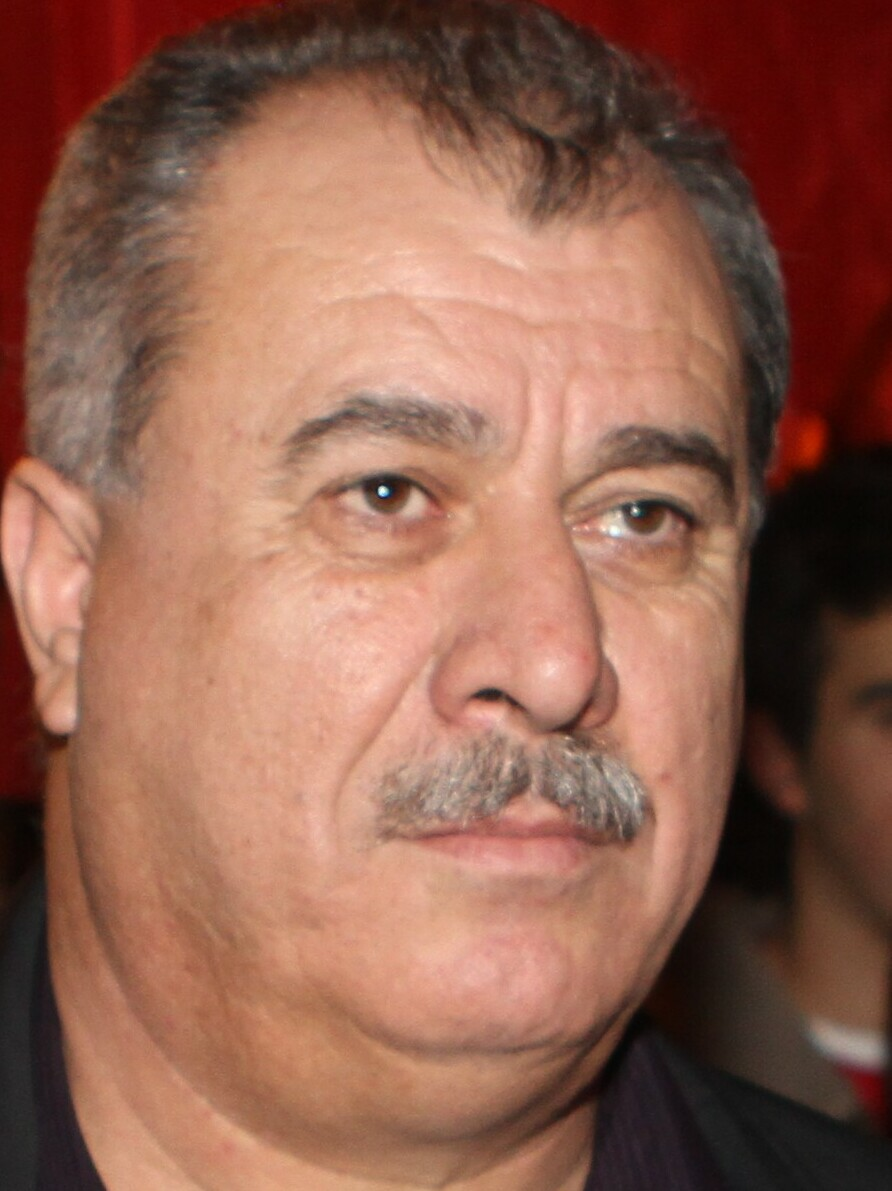

Candidate	Mohammad Barakeh	Walid Al-Fahum
Party	Hadash	Hadash
Percentage	75%
Leader before election
Mohammad Barakeh
Elected Leader
Mohammad Barakeh

The 2012 Hadash leadership election was held on 10 November 2012 to elect the leader of Hadash in the lead-up to the 2013 Israeli legislative election. The election saw the incumbent party leader, Mohammad Barakeh, reelected with 75% of the vote, fending off a challenge by lawyer Walid Al-Fahum. The vote was conducted among the 850 delegates at the party's convention, and coincided with other party elections, including the election for the party list.

== Candidates ==
- Walid Al-Fahum, lawyer
- Mohammad Barakeh, incumbent leader and member of the Knesset

== Result ==
After his re-election as party leader, as well as his election to the top seat on Hadash's party list, Barakeh joined Hana Sweid (who was elected to the second spot on the party list) in announcing that they both intended to leave the Knesset in two years, planning to hand power in the party over to others lower on the party list.

2012 Hadash leadership election
Candidate	Votes	%
Mohammad Barakeh (incumbent)		75
Walid Al-Fahum		
Total votes		100
