= Amjad Shbita =

Arab Israeli political activist and Secretary of Hadash

- أمجد شبيطة אמג'ד שביטה
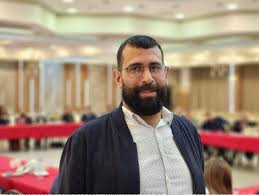
- Born: 1985 (age 40–41)
- Occupations: Political activist, journalist
- Known for: Secretary of Hadash; Co-CEO of Sikkuy-Aufoq
- Political party: Hadash, Communist Party of Israel

Amjad Shbita (Arabic: أمجد شبيطة; Hebrew: אמג'ד שביטה) is an Arab Israeli political activist, journalist, and the current secretary of the left-wing political coalition Hadash. Prior to his election to lead Hadash, he served as the co-CEO of Sikkuy-Aufoq, a shared organization of Jewish and Arab citizens of Israel.

== Journalism and advocacy ==
Shbita joined Sikkuy-Aufoq in 2011 as co-director of the Equality Policy Department. He later served as the director of public activity for Arab society and co-directed the Arab Representation Index project in Hebrew media. During his tenure, he initiated the ACT project, which encourages media activism among Arab citizens, and worked extensively on grassroots drives to encourage voting and political participation among Arab citizens of Israel.

As a media critic and journalist, Shbita frequently highlighted the Israeli mainstream media's bias. In a 2017 op-ed for Haaretz following the demolition of homes in the unrecognised Bedouin village of Umm al-Hiran, he criticized Israeli media for blindly adopting the police narrative that the incident was an ISIS-linked terror attack before the facts emerged, arguing that the media often functions as an echo chamber for government incitement against Arab citizens. Shbita is also a frequent contributor to various outlets, including the newspapers Zo HaDerekh, Al-Ittihad, Haaretz, Ynet and Local Call.

In 2019, Shbita was appointed co-CEO of Sikkuy-Aufoq alongside Ron Gerlitz, and later alongside Ofer Dagan. He resigned from the organization in March 2023 following his election as Secretary of Hadash.

== Political activity ==
Shbita's political career began in the Communist Party of Israel (Maki) and its youth movement. He served as a spokesperson and parliamentary aide to MK Dov Khenin before being elected Secretary-General of the Young Communist League of Israel in February 2010. He later held senior positions including as a member of Maki's Central Committee and Hadash's national secretariat. In the 2013 Israeli legislative election, Shbita was placed 44th on the Hadash electoral list.

In March 2023, Shbita was elected as the national Secretary of Hadash. As Secretary, Shbita has emphasized the importance of Jewish-Arab partnership and joint struggle, particularly during times of crisis, and co-founded the "Peace Partnership" initiative. Shbita has also been quoted in international left-wing media, including the French L'Humanité and the British Morning Star, warning against Israeli policies of apartheid and the systematic liquidation of the Palestinian cause.

As a leading proponent of reestablishing the Joint List ahead of the 2026 Israeli legislative election, Shbita was actively involved in the negotiations to form the electoral alliance.

=== Gaza war and police scrutiny ===
Following the outbreak of the Gaza War, Shbita became a prominent organizer in the Israeli anti-war movement. He publicly condemned the October 7 Hamas attacks on Israeli civilians as horrific crimes, but vehemently opposed the subsequent Israeli military offensive in Gaza. He argued that the war's true aims were to prolong Benjamin Netanyahu's rule, perpetuate the occupation, and eliminate the two-state solution.

During the war, Shbita and Hadash faced intense scrutiny and crackdowns from the Israeli police and right-wing political figures, which Shbita characterized as a coordinated campaign of political persecution aimed at outlawing the party. In December 2023, police threatened hall owners in order to prevent Hadash from holding its national council meeting. Throughout 2024, Shbita reported multiple instances of police harassment, including a raid on the Hadash club in Nazareth to erase a Palestinian flag, and the forced closure of the Haifa branch to prevent the screening of a film.

In January 2024, after police repeatedly denied permits for anti-war demonstrations, Shbita petitioned the High Court of Justice through the Association for Civil Rights in Israel (ACRI). The court ruled against the police, forcing them to allow a joint Jewish-Arab protest in Haifa.

Shbita frequently engages in media debates with Israeli journalists and commentators concerning the Israeli-Palestinian conflict and the conditions of the Arab minority in Israel. During a November 2023 interview on Ynet, shortly following the October 7 attacks, he referred to the attacks as acts of terror but refused to explicitly designate Hamas as a terrorist organization, arguing that it must be viewed as a component of the Palestinian national movement. This stance led to a televised confrontation with pro-Israel activist Yoseph Haddad. A year later, in November 2024, Shbita was interrogated by Israeli police on suspicion of incitement and supporting terrorism due to his anti-war remarks. He described this police action as an effort by the political right to establish grounds for banning Hadash.

== Personal life ==
Shbita lives in Tira and is married to Hana Mahameed, a journalist and a reporter for Al Mayadeen. Mahameed was previously wounded by the Israeli Police during a protest she was covering for the channel.

== See also ==
- Communist Party of Israel (Maki)
