= Odeh Bisharat =

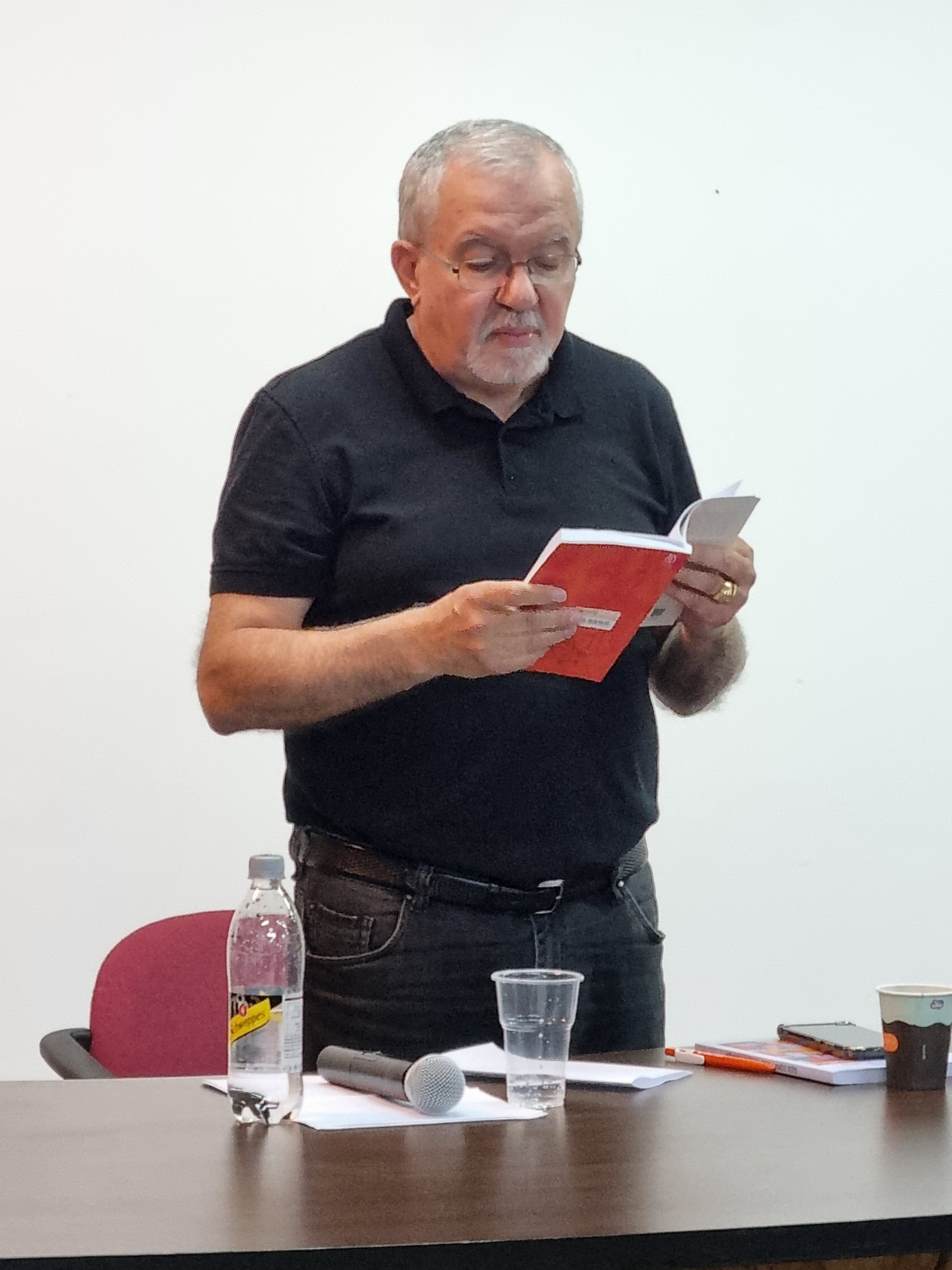
Odeh Bisharat, 2022

Odeh Bisharat (Hebrew: עודה בשאראת; Arabic: عودة بشارات; born 1958) is an Arab Israeli journalist, writer, and social activist. He publishes opinion columns in Haaretz and Al-Ittihad.

== Youth and education ==
Bisharat was born in 1958 in Yafa an-Naseriyye. His family had been displaced from Ma'alul, an Arab village destroyed by Israeli forces in the 1948 Palestine war.

Bisharat was active in the "communist youth movement", according to Israel Hayom.

He obtained a doctorate in biology.

== Teacher, writer and activist ==
Bisharat became a high school teacher. As of 2022, he continued as a teacher.

Bisharat's political activities continued during his university studies. He attributes his view "that Jews and Arabs are not enemies" to his communist background. Bisharat was an editor for the Arabic youth magazine Al-Ghad and columnist for Arabic newspaper Al-Ittihad.

He contributes to other Arabic language sources and has a weekly opinion column in Haaretz. He advocates for understanding and peaceful coexistence in Palestine and is critical of the Israeli government. His writing aims at improving understanding between different cultures in the Near East. He has appeared in TV shows broadcast by Channel 12 and i24 TV.

During the 2011 Israeli social justice protests, Jewish protest organisers invited Odeh Bisharat to speak at a rally of 300,000 people, where he stated, "It's time for this struggle to [be the] struggle of all those being exploited, Jews and Arabs."

Many of his articles are translated and published in foreign media, such as Boston Review, Goethe-Institut or in the Jewish Voice for Labour.

He has written several novels. He was the 2016 resident for the University of Iowa's International Writing Program. In 2017, he was given an award by the Ministry of Culture and Sport for "outstanding contributions to prose". He was a resident author at the Israel Institute for Advanced Studies from 2023 to 2024.

== Political affiliation ==
Bisharat has been the Secretary General of the Hadash political coalition. He was still a member in 2011.

== Literary works ==
Eithan Orkibi of Israel Hayom described Bisharat's novels The Streets of Zatunya and Dunya, whose themes include the 1948 Palestinian expulsion and flight, as political satires. Dunya includes a theme of the communist party playing a role in opposition to the Israeli government. Bisharat stated that an aim of his novels was to provide nuanced understanding of expulsion to the young generation of Arabs in Israel.

Bisharat described his view of literature, stating "For me, literature isn't political, it isn't a position paper" and that he considered it appropriate that his writing shows weaknesses and flaws in Arab culture, as part of "the internal discourse in a society that the other side identifies with".

- The streets of Zatunya (novel), 2007, translated into Hebrew and Finnish
- Dunya (novel), 2015, translated into Hebrew
- Play in Arabic, 2017
- Late Tammam Makehoul (novel), 2018
- Journey in the Realty of the Absurd, Scenes from Israeli Palestinians Life, 2018, ISBN 9789659229727
- Don't Steal My Turn (children's book)

== Personal life ==
Bisharat lives with his two sons, a daughter and his wife in Yafa an-Naseriyye.
