= Samir Bin Said =

Israeli Arab politician

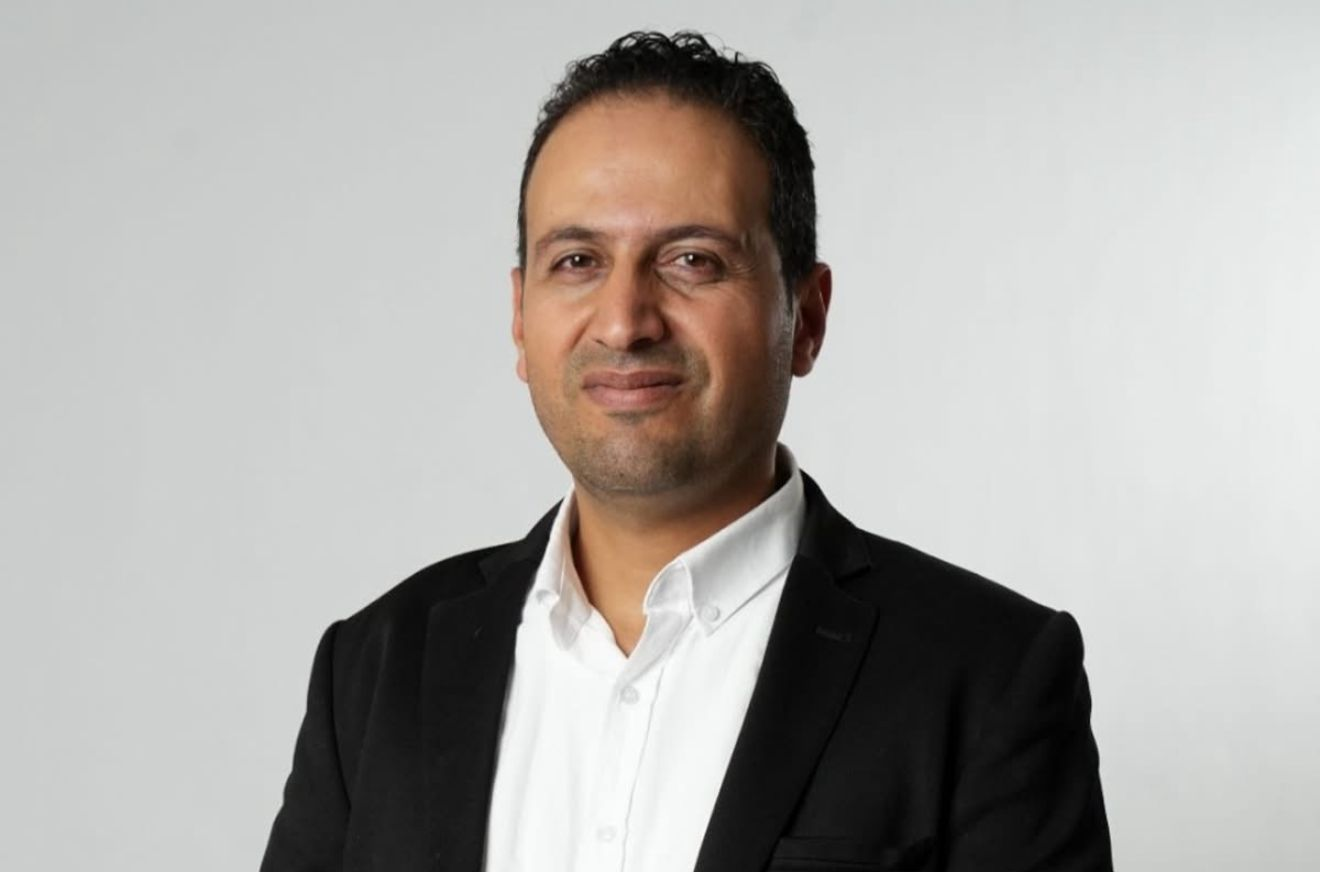
- Bin Said in 2024

Faction represented in the Knesset
- 2025–2026: Ta'al

Samir Bin Said is an Israeli Arab politician who served as a member of the Knesset for Ta'al from 2025 to 2026.

== Biography ==
Bin Said is a professor at Hebron University.

He was initially in the eighth slot of an electoral list for the Joint List for the 2022 Israeli legislative election, though the alliance split up before the deadline.

Bin Said, an MK for Ta'al, was the replacement for Youssef Atauna, who resigned from his Knesset seat in June 2025 as part of a rotation agreement between Hadash and Ta'al.
