= Ayman Odeh =

Arab Israeli politician (born 1975)

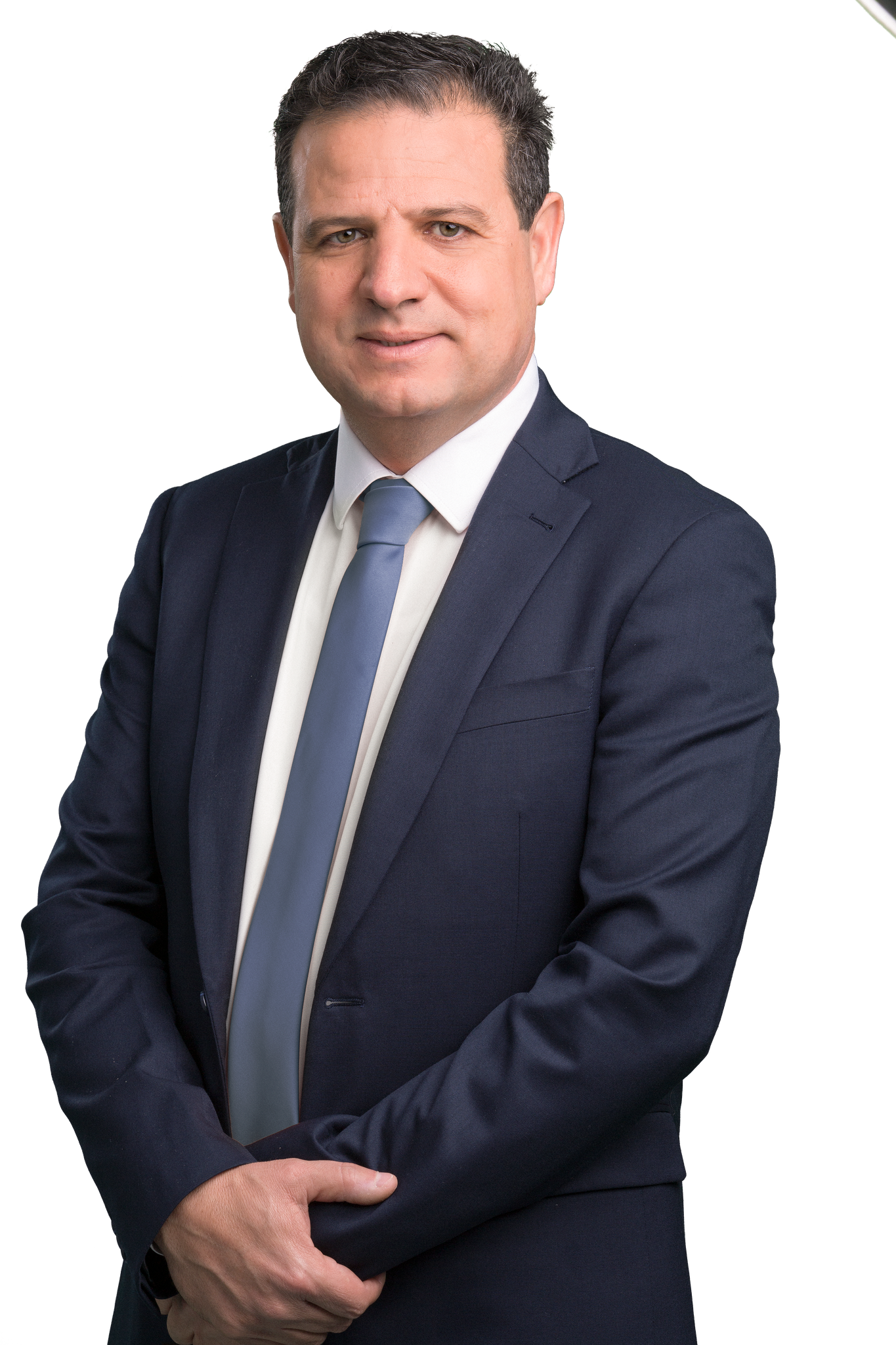
- Odeh in 2021

Faction represented in the Knesset
- 2015–2019: Joint List
- 2019: Hadash
- 2019–2022: Joint List
- 2022–2026: Hadash

Personal details
- Born: 1 January 1975 (age 51) Haifa, Israel
- Education: University of Craiova

Ayman Aadil Odeh (Arabic: أيمن عادل عودة, Hebrew: אַיְּימָן עַאדֶל עוֹדֶה; born 1 January 1975) is an Israeli lawyer and politician who served as a member of the Knesset. An Israeli of Arab-Muslim origin, he led the Hadash alliance between 2015 and 2026.

== Biography ==
Odeh was born in 1975, and raised in Haifa, within the Kababir neighbourhood. His father was a construction worker. Although his family was Muslim, Odeh's parents sent him to a Christian school where he was the only Muslim student, proudly noting that he got an A in New Testament studies on his high school final exams. He now describes himself as having transcended the confines of religion and ethnicity. He studied law at the University of Craiova in Romania from 1993 to 1997. During his law studies in Romania, he took part in pro-Palestinian rallies, learned Romanian, and read the memoirs of various political thinkers and revolutionaries. He earned a Bachelor of Laws degree from the University of Craiova and in 2001 was certified to practice law in Israel, though he is not a member of the Israel Bar Association.

Odeh met his wife Nardine Aseli, a gynecologist, at the wake for her 17-year-old brother who was killed in 2000 at the start of the Second Intifada. They married in 2005 and have three children.

He speaks Arabic, Hebrew, English and Romanian. In an interview with Haaretz he stated that he believes in God.

== Political career ==
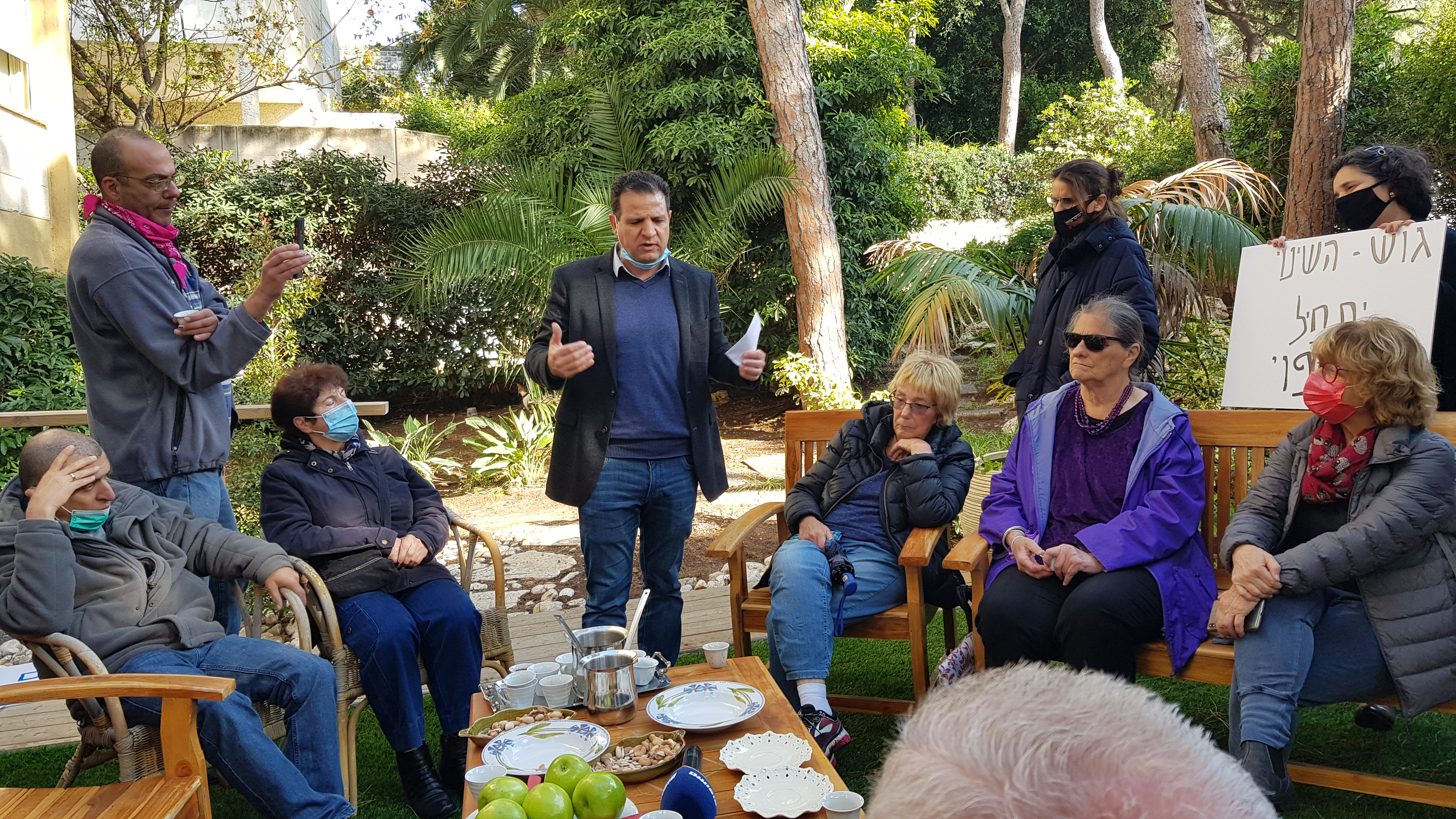
A meeting of demonstrators with Ayman Odeh at his home in Haifa on 2 April 2021, to call on him to enter the change government in order to prevent Benjamin Netanyahu from continuing to serve as prime minister. The meeting, which began as a demonstration, took place in parallel with the demonstrations in front of the houses of leaders of other opposition parties including Naftali Bennett, Gideon Saar and Benny Gantz.

Odeh joined Hadash, and represented it on Haifa City Council between 1998 and 2005, before becoming the party's secretary-general in 2006. He was placed 75th on the party's list for the 2009 elections, in which Hadash won four seats. He won sixth place on the party's list for the 2013 Knesset elections, but failed to enter the Knesset, as the party again won four seats.

Following the announcement that Hadash leader Mohammed Barakeh was resigning prior to the 2015 elections, Odeh was elected as the party's new leader. In the buildup to the 2015 elections, Hadash joined the Joint List, an alliance of the main Arab parties. Odeh was placed at the head of the Joint List's electoral list. Analysts credited the charismatic Odeh for giving the Arab political union a more moderate, pragmatic face. Odeh was elected to the 20th Knesset, along with 12 other candidates from the Joint List.

In an interview with The Times of Israel, Odeh discussed the Joint List's social agenda, including a 10-year plan to tackle issues pertinent to the Arab sector, such as employment of women, rehabilitation of failing regional councils, recognition of unrecognized Bedouin communities in the Negev, public transportation in Arab towns, and eradication of violence. He also said he supported the right of the Jewish people to self-determination in Israel, adding that a Palestinian state should fulfill the same goals for Arab Palestinians.

Odeh's campaign for the March 2015 elections had a "breakthrough moment" when, in a televised debate of candidates, Avigdor Lieberman, Israel's foreign minister, called Odeh a "Palestinian citizen" and said Odeh was not welcome in Israel. Odeh replied, "I am very welcome in my homeland. I am part of the nature, the surroundings, the landscape", contrasting his birth in Israel with Lieberman's immigration from the former Soviet Union. Odeh is now viewed as a potential power broker given that Arab parties appear to be uniting to meet the government's requirement that parties meet a minimum threshold of votes to secure a place in the Knesset. Odeh has a style that contrasts with that of MK Haneen Zoabi, who is more confrontational. Odeh voices his willingness to work with Jewish partners, and he often quotes Martin Luther King Jr.

In the 2020 election, Odeh and the Joint List recommended Benny Gantz for prime minister.

Odeh had stated that he was "happy for the release of hostages and prisoners" following the 2023 Gaza war ceasefire. A petition was created in January 2025 to expel him from the Knesset. After Odeh later said in a May speech that "Gaza has won and Gaza will win", the petition met the required number of signatures to move forward. It was brought forth in June 2025 by the Knesset House Committee, which was approved by 70 MKs (including 10 from the opposition). A Knesset vote in July to expel Odeh failed with 73 MKs in favor, 15 against and MKs from United Torah Judaism, Blue and White and most of Yesh Atid abstaining. A threshold of 90 votes was needed for it to pass.

In May 2023, Odeh announced his intention to stand down as Hadash leader and retire from politics at the end of his term. He was replaced as Hadash chairman by Yousef Jabareen in May 2026.

== Award and recognition ==
- Listed as top 100 leading global thinkers by Foreign Policy magazine
- Listed as top 100 influential by TheMarker magazine for the year 2016, and was listed in the 9th place
- Listed as top 100 influential by TheMarker magazine for the year 2017

== Views and opinions ==
Odeh says his service on Haifa City Council made it clear to him that Arabs and Jews must work together. He describes Haifa as "the most liberal multicultural yet homogenous city in Israel".

Odeh has also expressed strong support for increasing recognition of Mizrahi culture and Arab Jewish history in official Israeli and Palestinian discourses; in a widely cited speech to the Knesset plenum in July 2015, MK Odeh argued that the State of Israel has systematically discriminated against and suppressed the culture of Jews who immigrated to Israel from Arab and Muslim lands (who make up the majority of the Israeli population) in order to feed the idea of a natural separation between Jews and Arabs. He also argued that the large role played by Jews in forming historical and modern Arab culture (including famous Jews such as Rabbi David Buzaglo, who wrote Jewish religious poetry primarily in Arabic, and famous Jews who were popular in the Arab world in the mid-20th century, such as Leila Mourad), has been forgotten by Jews and Arabs alike due to the ideological elements of the Arab–Israeli conflict, and the desire by Israel's elite to portray a Western image of Jews and of the country. Odeh called upon Jewish and Arab members of the Knesset alike to support a new Knesset committee (which he had joined as a member) lobbying for the re-emphasizing of the culture of Jews from Arab and Muslim lands. In that speech, Odeh summarized his position thus: "The culture of the Jews of Arab and Islamic countries is a shared Jewish and Arab culture. Because of this, the state has fought [against] it, and yet because of this [same reason], we must fight to strengthen it."

Odeh says, "We represent those who are invisible in this country, and we give them a voice. We also bring a message of hope to all people, not just to the Arabs, but to the Jews, too".

In October 2015, Odeh gave support to the "unarmed Palestinian struggle". However, when asked about "throwing rocks, ... firebombs, and shooting at cars", Odeh responded that regarding throwing rocks, he supported the First Intifada.

In February 2016, Odeh considered resigning from the Knesset to show his protest against a controversial MK suspension bill.

== Controversy ==
=== Shin Bet interrogations ===
Israel's internal intelligence agency, the Shin Bet, has interrogated Odeh many times in the past. He said in an interview to The New Yorker: "I was called three more times by the Shin Bet. They never hit me. But they succeeded in two things. I isolated myself from my friends—I became much more introverted. And I had the sense the Shin Bet was watching me no matter where I went. When I went to the bus station, and I saw some guy in sunglasses, I just assumed he was Shin Bet."

=== Death threats ===
A right-wing activist was arrested in February 2016 for making death threats against Odeh.

=== Umm al-Hiran incident ===
On 18 January 2017, Odeh was allegedly shot by a sponge-tipped bullet in the forehead by Israel Police as he protested against the demolition of homes in the Bedouin village of Umm al-Hiran. The police initially claimed that he was hit by stones thrown by other protestors. It later backtracked, claiming both that it had never stated that Odeh was hit by stones and that it didn't know what caused Odeh's head injury.

The British Forensic Architecture, led by Eyal Weizman of Goldsmiths, University of London, which analyzed video evidence of the incident strongly suspected that Odeh had been hit by a sponge-tipped bullet because 47 seconds of video had been redacted – precisely the time during which Odeh was injured.

=== Incidents in Knesset ===
In November 2024, Odeh was ejected from the Knesset after accusing Prime Minister Netanyahu of being a "serial killer of peace". During his speech, Odeh recounted the story of a man whose rented apartment was destroyed by an Israeli airstrike while he was obtaining birth certificates for his newborn twins, killing both infants and their mother. "What is your vision? A serial killer of peace?" Odeh said before being forcibly removed from the podium.

On 22 May 2025, he condemned the Gaza war and was again, forcefully dragged out of the Knesset.

On 13 October 2025, during U.S. President Donald Trump's speech as part of his visit to the Knesset during the Gaza peace plan, Odeh along with Knesset member Ofer Cassif held signs demanding Palestinian recognition, and called Trump a "terrorist". They were both forcefully removed from the Knesset.

Party political offices
Preceded by Mohammad Barakeh	Leader of Hadash; 2015–present	Incumbent
New office	Leader of the Joint List; 2015–2019; 2019–present	Incumbent
