= Avraham Levenbraun =

Israeli politician (1916–1987)

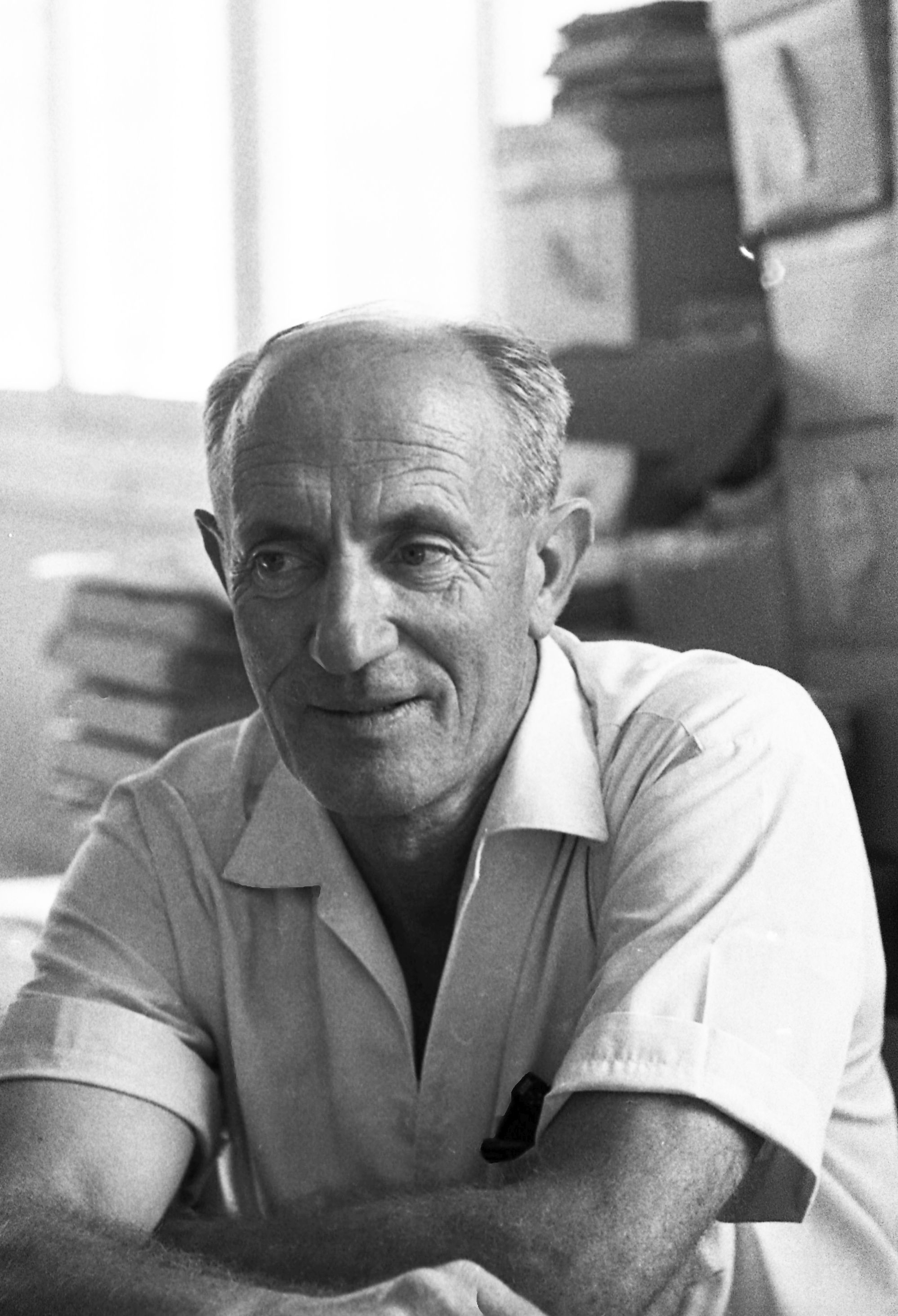
- Levenbraun in 1969

Faction represented in the Knesset
- 1972–1977: Rakah
- 1977: Hadash
- 1981: Hadash

Personal details
- Born: 24 June 1916 Ștefănești, Romania
- Died: 25 August 1987 (aged 71) Israel

Avraham Levenbraun (Hebrew: אברהם לבנבראון; 24 June 1916 – 25 August 1987) was an Israeli politician who served as a member of the Knesset for Rakah and Hadash. He served in the seventh, eighth, and ninth Knessets across two distinct periods between 1972 and 1981.

== Biography ==
Born in Ștefănești in Romania, Levenbraun was a member of Hashomer Hatzair during his youth. He emigrated to Mandatory Palestine in 1938 and joined kibbutz Ruhama, where he lived until 1944 when he left due to ideological differences. He moved to Migdal and then Haifa, where he worked as a crane operator at a chemical and fertiliser factory. He became a member of the workers' board, and later its secretary.

In 1954 he joined Maki, having previously been a Mapam member, in 1965 during the split within Maki, he joined the majority group of Vilner and Toubi to form Rakakh. He was on the party's list for the 1969 elections, and although he failed to win a seat, he entered the Knesset on 16 February 1972 as a replacement for Emile Habibi. He was re-elected in 1973, but lost his seat in the 1977 elections. He briefly returned to the Knesset in February 1981 as a replacement for the deceased Hanna Mwais, but lost his seat in the June 1981 elections. He was a member of the Rakah central committee from 1965 until 1985, and was also a member of the Histadrut's executive committee.

== Personal life ==
Levenbraun's son, Rami Livnheh, was a member of Matzpen and later joined its splinter organization Ma'avak. He was a "Socialist Revolution List" candidate in the 1973 Knesset elections. That same year, Livneh was convicted of contacting a foreign agent following meetings with members of Fatah.

Levenbraun died in 1987 and was buried in the Southern Cemetery.
