= Youssef Atauna =

Israeli Arab politician

- Atauna in 2026

Faction represented in the Knesset
- 2017–2018: Joint List
- 2022–2025: Hadash–Ta'al
- 2026–: Joint List

Personal details
- Born: 25 October 1966 (age 60) Israel

Youssef Atauna (Arabic: يوسف العطاونة, Hebrew: יוסף עטאונה; born 26 October 1966) is an Israeli Arab politician who serves as a member of the Knesset for the Joint List. He previously served as a member for the Joint List between October 2017 and February 2018 and was an MK for Hadash from 2022 until 2025.

== Biography ==
A member of Hadash, prior to the 2015 Knesset elections the four main Arab parties formed the Joint List alliance. Atauna was placed seventeenth on the alliance's list, missing out on a seat as the Joint List won 13 seats.

Prior to the election the Joint List parties had made a rotation agreement, which required the last Ta'al MK to give up their seat for a United Arab List candidate and the final Hadash MK to give up their seat for the next Balad candidate. However, as Balad's Basel Ghattas had been jailed and the next Balad candidate (Juma Azbarga) had already entered the Knesset. At the point at which the rotation was supposed to happen, the United Arab List's Ibrahim Hijazi resigned after only a month in the Knesset, with Atauana and the next Ta'al candidate (Wael Younis in 18th place) were expected to forgo the opportunity to enter the Knesset, allowing Balad's Nivin Abu Rahmon in 19th place on the list to become an MK.

However, Hadash and Ta'al opted not to honour the agreement, with Atauna entering the Knesset on 25 October 2017 as Hijazi's replacement. However, he subsequently resigned from the Knesset in February 2018 in what he referred to as "a goodwill gesture in order to preserve the Joint List", and was replaced by Wael Younis of Ta'al. Atauna resigned from his Knesset seat in June 2025 and was replaced by Samir Bin Said as part of a rotation agreement between Hadash and Ta'al.

It has been alleged on the Israeli web magazine HaOkets that Atauna leads a Polygamist lifestyle, despite polygamy being illegal in Israel, he has three children.
