= Ofer Cassif =

Israeli politician (born 1964)

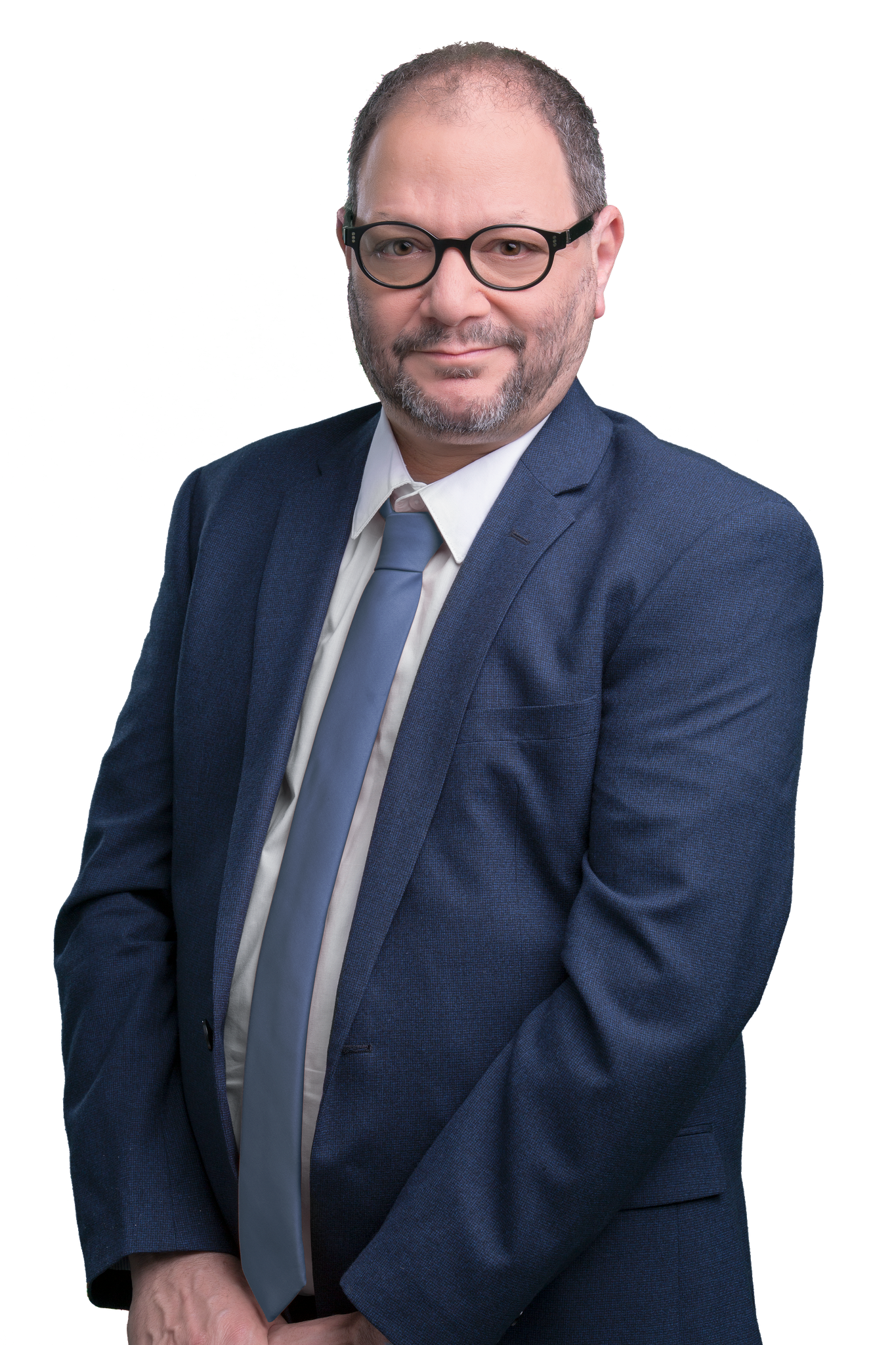
- Cassif in 2021

Faction represented in the Knesset
- 2019: Hadash
- 2019–2022: Joint List
- 2022–2026: Hadash-Ta'al
- 2026–: Joint List

Personal details
- Born: 25 December 1964 (age 61) Rishon LeZion, Israel
- Party: Communist Party of Israel
- Education: PhD (LSE)
- Occupation: Politician, political philosopher

Ofer Cassif (Hebrew: עֹופֶר כַּסִיף; born 25 December 1964) is an Israeli politician. A member of the Communist Party of Israel and the Israeli far-left, he has represented the Hadash coalition in the Knesset since April 2019.

== Biography ==
Cassif was born in Rishon LeZion on 25 December 1964. He attended Shalmon Elementary School and the Reali Gymnasium, where he was friends with Nitzan Horowitz. Raised in a Mapai-supporting household, Cassif joined the Left Camp of Israel's youth group at the age of 16.

Cassif served in the Israel Defense Forces (IDF) with the Nahal and the Nahal paratrooper brigade. During the First Intifada, he was imprisoned four times as a conscientious objector, stating that he refused to participate in the "oppression and occupation of the Palestinians."

== Academic career ==
Cassif pursued academic studies in political philosophy after completing his compulsory military service. He earned a BA and MA in philosophy at the Hebrew University of Jerusalem.

He later completed a PhD in political philosophy at the London School of Economics, where his doctoral dissertation, On nationalism and democracy: A Marxist examination, examined the relationship between nationalism, democracy, and class relations from a Marxist theoretical perspective.

Following the completion of his doctorate, Cassif undertook postdoctoral research at Columbia University.

Cassif has taught political science and political philosophy at Israeli academic institutions, including Tel Aviv University, Academic College of Tel Aviv-Yafo and Sapir Academic College. His academic work focuses on Marxist theory, critiques of nationalism, democratic theory, and the relationship between ethnicity, class, and state power.

== Political ideology and positions ==
Cassif identifies as a Marxist and a communist, and has consistently grounded his political activity in socialist theory and class-based analysis.

He is a senior member of the Communist Party of Israel (Maki) and has described Marxism as central to his understanding of democracy, political equality, and state power.

Cassif has publicly described himself as an explicit anti-Zionist. In interviews and opinion pieces, he has argued that Zionism—as both an ideology and a political practice—undermines democratic equality by privileging one ethnic or national group over others.

He has stated that meaningful democracy in Israel requires full civic and national equality for all citizens, regardless of ethnicity or religion, and has rejected defining the state along ethnic lines.

A persistent critic of Israeli government policy in the Israeli-occupied territories—including the West Bank and East Jerusalem—Cassif has opposed Israeli settlement expansion, military rule, and settler violence, which he has described as structurally linked to the occupation.

In the economic sphere, Cassif has advocated extensive state intervention, progressive taxation, and public control over key resources, arguing that capitalism is incompatible with social equality and democratic principles. He has supported stronger labor rights and expanded social welfare policies.

Following the outbreak of the Gaza war in October 2023, Cassif stated that Israeli government policy contributed to the escalation and accused the government of violating international law in its conduct of the war.

In January 2024, Cassif publicly announced his support for South Africa’s legal action against Israel at the International Court of Justice under the Genocide Convention, stating that his position reflected a constitutional and moral obligation rather than loyalty to any particular government.

== Political career ==
=== Early political activity ===
While studying at the Hebrew University of Jerusalem, Cassif was active in anti-war activism and worked as a parliamentary aide to Hadash MK Meir Vilner. Influenced by Marxism and socialism, he became a prominent member of the Communist Party of Israel (Maki), serving on both its Central Committee and its Political Bureau.

For the April 2019 Knesset elections, Cassif was placed fifth on the joint Hadash–Ta'al list, occupying the "Jewish slot" following the retirement of Dov Khenin.

In March 2019, the Central Elections Committee disqualified Cassif's candidacy. The Supreme Court of Israel overturned the decision and allowed his candidacy to proceed.

Cassif entered the Knesset after the alliance won six seats and was subsequently re-elected in September 2019, 2020, and 2021.

=== Parliamentary activity and incidents ===
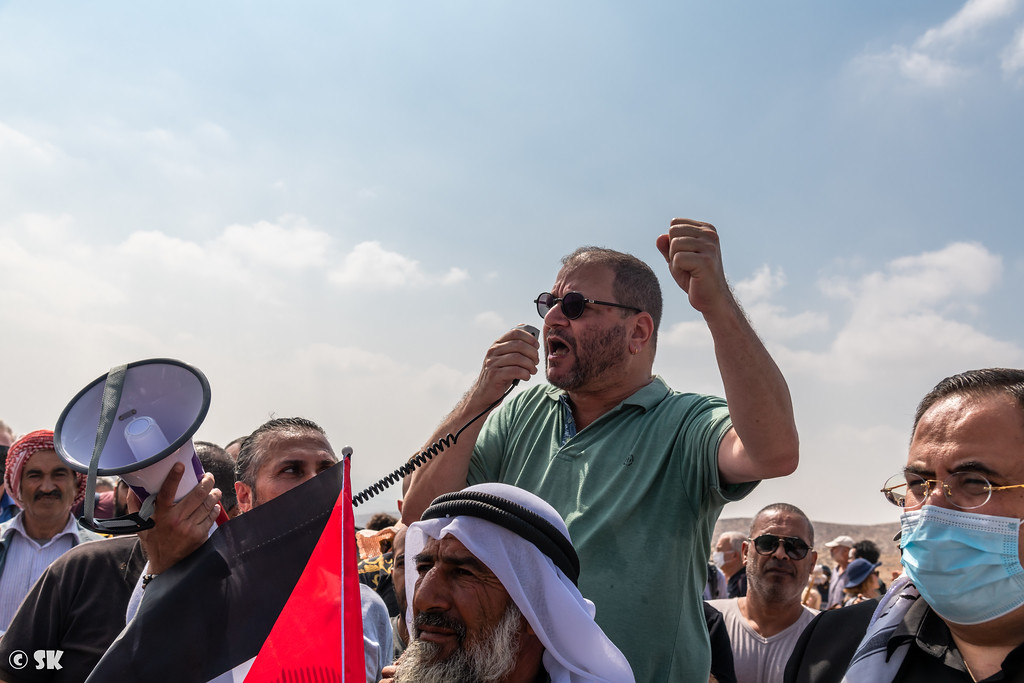
Ofer Cassif participating in a demonstration in At-Tuwani, October 2021.

During his tenure in the Knesset, Cassif has been active primarily in committee work dealing with civil rights, social policy, education, and economic regulation. Across the 23rd, 24th, and 25th Knessets, he has served on the Knesset Constitution, Law and Justice Committee, the Knesset Education, Culture and Sports Committee, and the Knesset Economic Affairs Committee, as well as on multiple joint and special committees.

In November 2020, Cassif was appointed chair of the Subcommittee on Higher Education, operating under the Education, Culture and Sports Committee. In that role, he led discussions on academic freedom, access to higher education for marginalized communities, and state oversight of universities and colleges.

Cassif has also initiated and sponsored social and labor‑focused legislation. With the formation of the 25th Knesset, he submitted bills proposing the establishment of a National Authority for Occupational Safety and Health, and legislation to guarantee compensation for residents of Abu Kabir affected by large‑scale development projects. Both initiatives were framed as protections for vulnerable workers and residents facing systemic neglect.

In addition to his legislative initiatives, Cassif has chaired and participated in several parliamentary caucuses (lobbies), including those promoting academic freedom, public psychology and mental health services, climate justice, and public housing. His caucus leadership has focused on welfare policy, equality before the law, and state responsibility toward disadvantaged populations.

Alongside this parliamentary activity, Cassif has been involved in a number of high‑profile confrontations with law enforcement and parliamentary authorities. In April 2021, he was filmed being assaulted by police during a protest against evictions and settlement activity in Sheikh Jarrah, East Jerusalem. The incident triggered condemnation from politicians across the political spectrum and a subsequent investigation by the police internal investigations department. Cassif was later investigated on suspicion of striking a police officer during the confrontation.

Cassif was barred from running in the 2026 Israeli legislative election by the Central Elections Committee on 23 September 2026 by a vote of 19-6, with two abstentions. Cassif was accused of providing "support for an armed struggle by an enemy state or terrorist organization against the State of Israel." Attorney general of Israel Gali Baharav-Miara and State Attorney Amit Aisman both found that the submitted evidence did not merit disqualification. The disqualification was reviewed by the Supreme Court of Israel on 2 October and overturned by a vote of 7-2.

=== Gaza war-related statements and disciplinary proceedings ===
On 8 October 2023, shortly after the outbreak of the Gaza war, Cassif gave an interview to Al Jazeera English in which he stated that Hadash had previously warned that the continued Israeli occupation of Palestinian territories would lead to escalation.

Following the interview, the Knesset Ethics Committee imposed a 45-day suspension on Cassif from plenary and committee activity. Cassif criticized the decision as an infringement on freedom of political expression.

In January 2024, Cassif announced his support for South Africa's legal proceedings against Israel before the International Court of Justice. The subsequent motion to expel him from the Knesset failed to secure the required majority.

In November 2024, Cassif was suspended for six months by the Knesset Ethics Committee.

Cassif was again suspended for two months between October and December 2025.

During a speech by U.S. President Donald Trump to the Knesset, Cassif and MK Ayman Odeh interrupted the address while displaying placards reading "Recognise Palestine". Both were escorted from the chamber.

== Personal life ==
Cassif is Jewish. He is married and has one son. He lives in Rehovot.
