= Abdullah Abu Ma'aruf =

Israeli Druze doctor and politician

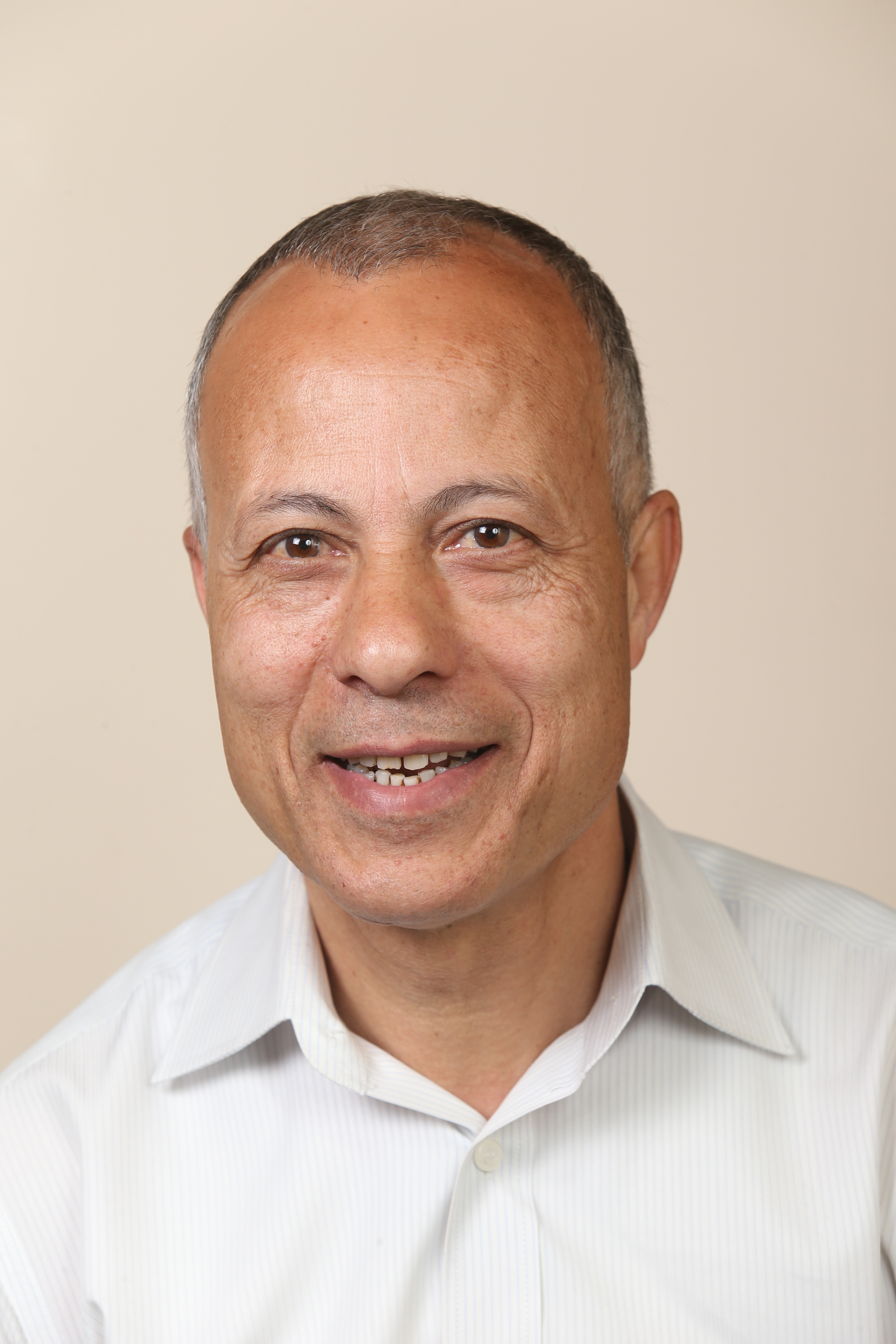
- Abu Ma'aruf in 2015

Faction represented in the Knesset
- 2015–2017: Joint List

Personal details
- Born: 30 December 1956 (age 69) Yarka, Israel

Abdullah Abu Ma'aruf (Arabic: عبد الله أبو معروف, Hebrew: עבדאללה אבו מערוף; born 30 December 1956) is an Israeli Druze doctor and politician. He served as a member of the Knesset for the Joint List between 2015 and 2017.

== Biography ==
Born in Yarka, Israel, Abu Ma'aruf studied medicine in the Soviet Union after receiving a scholarship from the Israeli Communist Party, and gained Russian citizenship. He specialised in urology and family medicine, and currently works at Carmel Medical Centre.

He was amongst the first conscientious objectors in the Druze community, and is an active member of Physicians for Human Rights. He has also been written for the Communist Party's Arab language newspaper Al-Ittihad.

A member of Hadash, prior to the 2015 elections he was placed thirteenth on the Joint List list, an alliance of Hadash, Balad, the Islamic Movement, the United Arab List and Ta'al. He was elected to the Knesset as the alliance won 13 seats. After he was elected, he was required to give up his Russian citizenship. In 2017 he resigned from the Knesset as part of a rotation agreement and was replaced by Said al-Harumi from the United Arab List.
