= Saleh Saleem =

Arab-Israeli politician

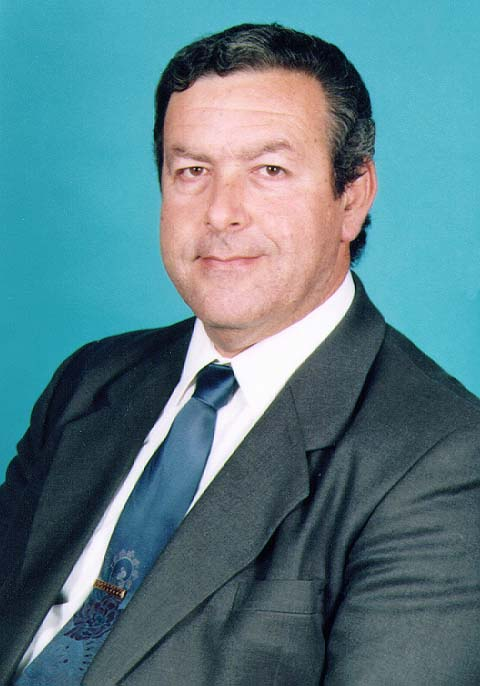
- Saleem in the 1990s

Faction represented in the Knesset
- 1994–1999: Hadash

Personal details
- Born: 2 November 1953 (age 72) Israel

Saleh Saleem (Arabic: صالح سليم, Hebrew: סאלח סלים; born 2 November 1953) is an Israeli Arab former politician who served as a member of the Knesset for Hadash between 1994 and 1999.

== Biography ==
In 1985 he became head of I'billin local council, a position he held until 2008. He was placed fourth on the Hadash list for the 1992 elections, but missed out on a seat as the party won three seats. However, he entered the Knesset on 5 July 1994 as a replacement for the deceased Tawfiq Ziad. After being placed second on the joint Hadash-Balad list, he was re-elected in the 1996 elections and was appointed Deputy Speaker of the Knesset. Prior to the 1999 elections he decided to retire from politics, and was given a symbolic place on the party's list (116th), losing his seat. Saleh was a member of the central committee of Maki from 1997 to 2002.
