= Ahmad Sa'd =

Israeli politician (1945–2010)

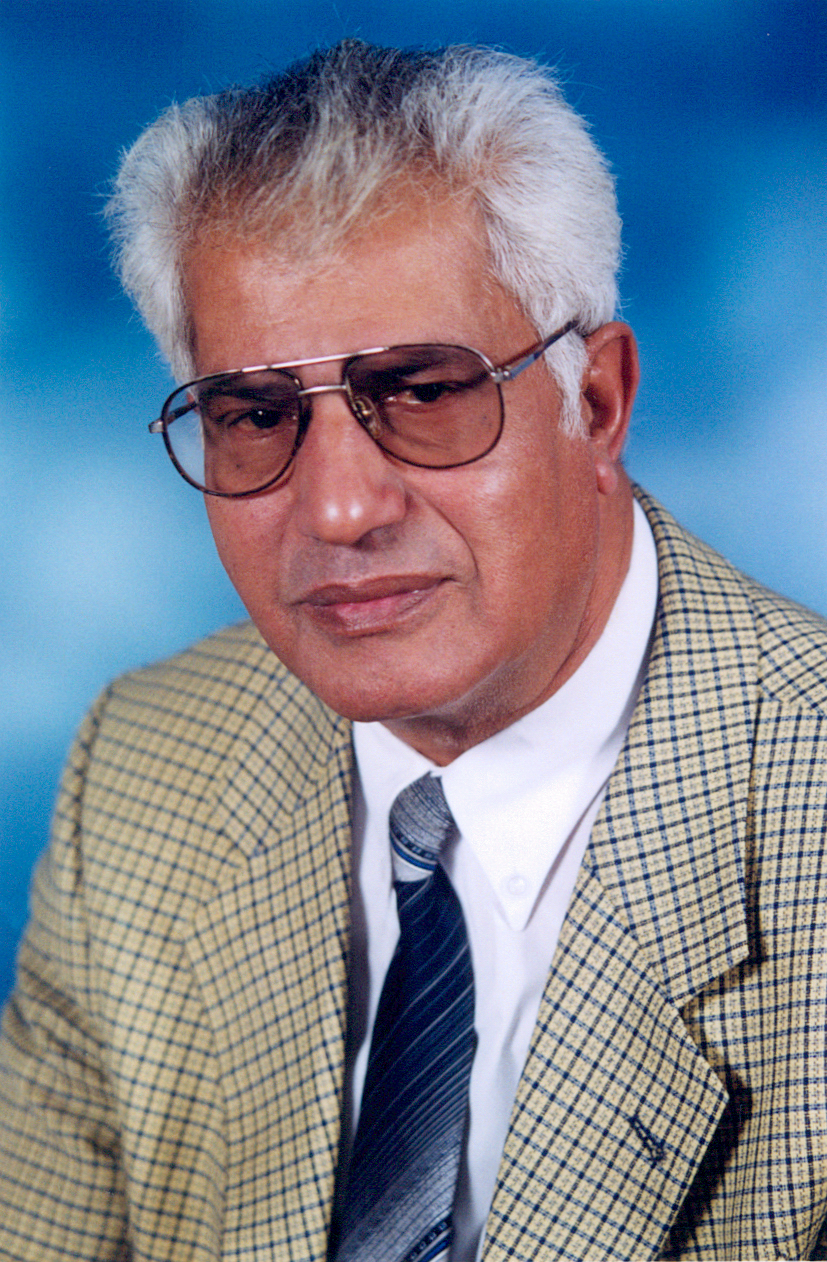
- Sa'd in the 1990s

Faction represented in the Knesset
- 1996–1999: Hadash

Personal details
- Born: 25 November 1945 Al-Birwa, Mandatory Palestine
- Died: 20 April 2010 (aged 64)

Ahmad Sa'd (Arabic: أحمد سعد, Hebrew: אחמד סעד; 25 November 1945 – 20 April 2010) was an Israeli Arab journalist and politician. He served as a member of the Knesset for Hadash between 1996 and 1999. Sa'd was also a member of the Maki politburo and served as editor of the Al-Ittihad newspaper.

== Biography ==
Sa'd was born in Al-Birwa in 1945; his family was expelled from the village in 1948. He studied economics at the University of Leningrad, earning a PhD. He worked as a director of the Emile Touma Institute for Social and Political Research in Haifa, and was a member of the secretariat of the High Follow-Up Committee for Arab Citizens of Israel. He wrote nine books on economics and Israeli Arabs, as well as writing for Al-Ittihad.

A member of the bureau of both Hadash and its Maki faction, Sa'd was elected to the Knesset on the Hadash–Balad list in 1996, and served on the Knesset finance committee.
