= Dov Khenin =

Israeli politician

- דב חנין
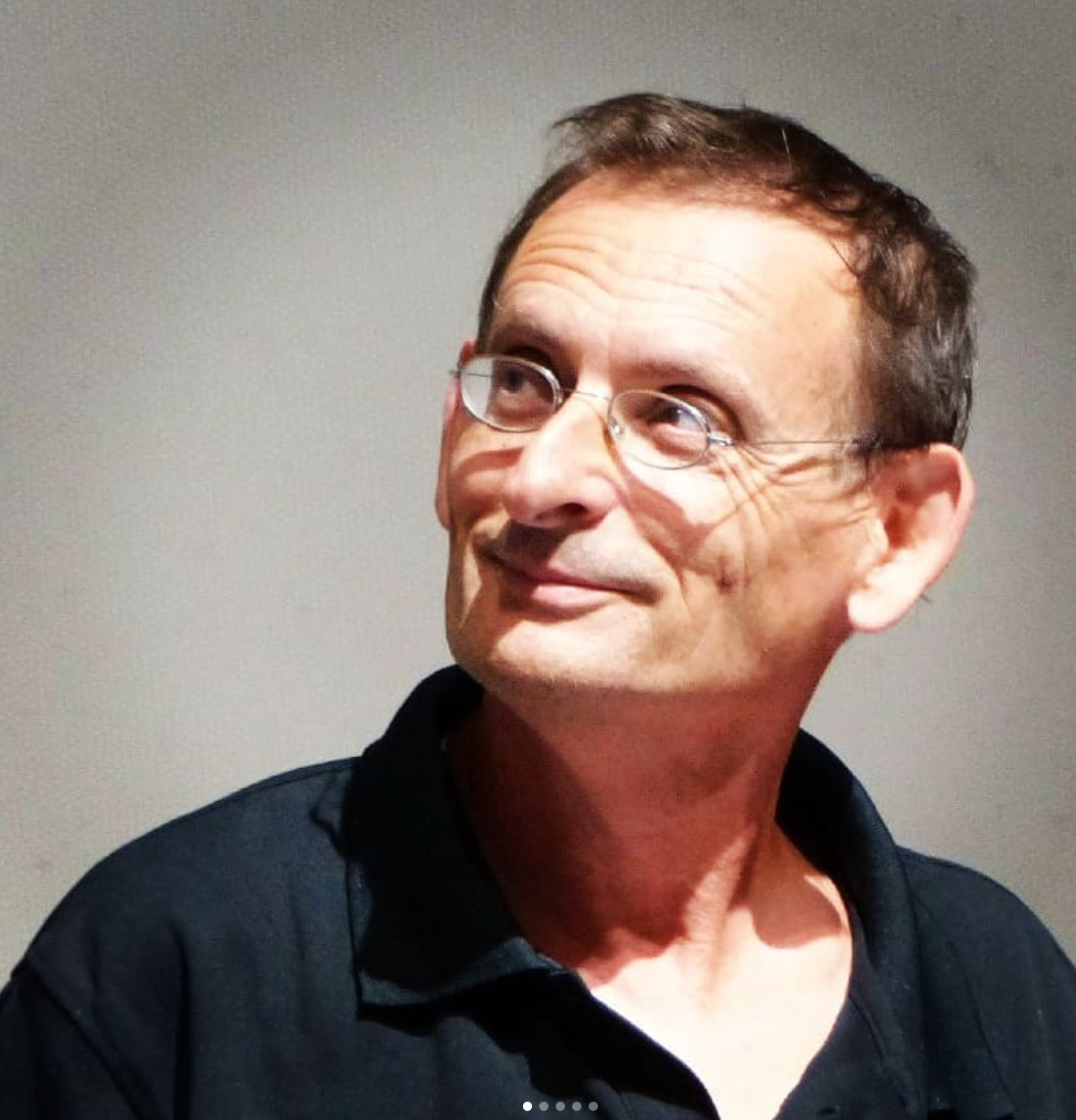

Faction represented in the Knesset
- 2006–2015: Hadash
- 2015–2019: The Joint List

Personal details
- Born: 10 January 1958 (age 68) Petah Tikva, Israel
- Party: Communist Party of Israel
- Education: Hebrew University of Jerusalem
- Awards: Outstanding Parliamentarian Award (2012)
- Website: www.dovblog.org

Dov Boris Khenin (Hebrew: דב חנין; born 10 January 1958) is an Israeli politician, political scientist, and lawyer who served in the Knesset as a member of the Joint List. He was a member of the central committee of the Communist Party of Israel, the largest faction of the Hadash coalition. He is also an activist for socioeconomic equality and an environmentalist. Throughout his tenure in the Knesset until his resignation in 2019, Khenin was the sole Jewish member of the Knesset from the Joint List.

== Early years ==
Dov was born in 1958 in Petah Tikva to David and Shula Khenin. His father, originally from Gomel in present-day Belarus, was a leading figure in the Communist Party of Israel. His mother was a preschool teacher and Communist activist. His paternal grandfather was a Chabad hassid, and Dov was named for his paternal uncle, who was killed in the Holocaust.

As a youth, Khenin became involved in Banki, the Young Communist League of Israel. He completed his IDF service at the rank of staff sergeant. During his service, he refused to serve in the West Bank and Gaza Strip due to ideological dissent.

Khenin completed a Bachelor of Laws degree at Hebrew University of Jerusalem in 1982. He later completed a master's degree in political science.

== Political career ==
Since 1990, Khenin has been a leading member of the Israeli Communist Party. During the elections for the 16th Knesset, he held the number four spot on the Hadash-Ta'al list. At the time, the party was only about 500 votes behind in order for Khenin to be able to enter the Knesset. On January 14, 2006, Khenin placed third on the Hadash list, and was subsequently elected to the 17th Knesset.

Khenin was a member of the Internal Affairs and Environment Committee, and he also headed the Knesset’s joint committee on Environment and Health. Additionally, he served as chairman, alongside Knesset member Rabbi Michael Melchior, of the social-environmental lobby, the largest lobby in the 17th Knesset.

In the 18th Knesset, Khenin co-chaired the social-environmental caucus together with MK Nitzan Horowitz.

=== General positions ===
One of Khenin's main focuses is the rights of workers. In 2014, he said, "the problem of low wages is the most critical of all. Not the price of cottage cheese and not even apartment prices". That year he initiated legislation to increase the minimum wage from 23 NIS to 30 NIS. This legislation received widespread, cross-party support, with backing from 61 of the 120 members of the 19th Knesset. In December 2014, the minimum wage for workers was raised to 27 NIS through a contract agreement between the Histadrut labor union and the Manufacturers Association of Israel. Khenin welcomed the progress, but vowed to keep pushing toward his original goal of a 30 NIS minimum wage.

Khenin also works to keep the influence of money out of politics, supporting the campaign against the privatization of Israel's natural gas resources. In 2015, Prime Minister Netanyahu's cabinet voted to allow the development of offshore natural gas harvesting in the Mediterranean sea. Khenin and other critics noted how this would give too much power to the American Nobel Energy group, as well as pose a conflict of interest for Netanyahu. In an effort to make the voting process fairer, Khenin and MK Zehava Galon asked Attorney General Yehuda Weinstein to exclude the Prime Minister from voting on the issue. Khenin also participated in the large protests in response to the deal. At a protest in Haifa, he said, "this struggle is not only an economic struggle or a social struggle. It is also a struggle for democracy. There is no democracy where capital rules.”

Khenin also supports broader ecological legislation. In 2012, he proposed setting up an "environmental court" for Israel. He envisioned a court that would watch over the country's natural resources and safeguard wildlife and ecosystems. Recognizing the municipality's lack of authority over traffic regulations, in 2008 Khenin acted to pass legislation that would have communities create their own policies. This legislation, aimed at allowing a more direct and local solution to automotive pollution problems, allows for effective public transportation changes to be implemented on a smaller scale. Khenin also battled against industrial pollution in Haifa. In 2014, he headed a subcommittee calling for stricter environmental standards on the oil refineries along Haifa's port. The panel showed a possible link between pollution from the refineries and increased risk of cancer among local residents.

In regard to past conflicts with Gaza, Khenin is clear that Israel is at fault. During Operation Protective Edge, he vehemently opposed the war, placing complete blame on Netanyahu. During the summer of 2014 Khenin spoke out against the operation in the political and social spheres. At a protest in Tel Aviv, Khenin asked a crowd of 7,000, "we must answer truthfully: Has a drop of all this bloodshed really helped bring us to a better place?”

=== Mayoral campaign ===
In 2008, Khenin was the mayoral candidate for the Ir Lekhulanu ("City for All") party. The party was supported by the Jaffa Jewish-Arab list Yafa (whose partners are Balad and Hadash) and endorsed by the Green Movement in Tel Aviv's 2008 municipal election. Khenin's platform largely focused on improving civil infrastructure, public transportation, housing, education equality, and ecology. He also ran on a concept of promoting communities within Tel Aviv, saying in an interview, "the most important thing in the city is not the streets and the buildings, but the people and the communities." Khenin lost the election with 34.3% of the vote to incumbent mayor Ron Huldai's 50.6%. Khenin vowed to continue battling Huldai's policies from the Knesset and Tel Aviv's opposition.

=== Legislation ===
Khenin's legislation focuses mainly on issues pertaining to human rights, ecology, and social change. He has been forthright in his disagreement with the Israeli government's policies, speaking out against environmental, military and humanitarian issues.

==== Human and social rights ====
- Law for Adequate Prison Conditions – Bill to ensure adequate prison conditions that protect the health and dignity of prisoners, including medical treatment, proper care, a bed, mattress and blankets, a cabinet, suitable and healthy food, ventilation and light in the cell and daily walks in the open air. The law applies to all prisoners without distinction, including security prisoners.
- Transparency of Decisions of the Israel Lands Authority – Requires the Israel Lands Authority (ILA), which controls more than 90% of state-owned lands, to publish all its decisions immediately on the Internet, in order to prevent the possibility of corruption, discrimination, nepotism and the favoring of financial interests. Before the law was enacted, only 51 out of 1800 administrative decisions of the ILA were published.
- Prohibition of Entrance Fees to Public Parks – An amendment to the Municipalities Ordinance that prohibits local authorities from collecting entrance fees to public parks. Together with MK Moshe Gafni and MK David Azoulay.
- Prohibition of Attachments on Mobility Grants for the Blind – Mobility grants enabling blind people to pay for assistance for basic mobility needs (e.g. shopping at the supermarket) and integrate in society will henceforth be protected from all types of attachments. Since a significant proportion of the blind in Israel live below the poverty line, many suffer from attachments on their accounts due to debts. Together with MK Meir Sheetrit.
- Law for the Rights of Victims of Crime – Grants status to victims of hit-and-run crimes during the process of plea bargaining with the offender. Together with MK Zeev Bielski.
- Prevention of a Criminal Record for Military Offenses – such as the refusal of an order or absence without leave. In December 2010 this bill passed the preliminary reading together with a similar bill by MK Miri Regev and was sent to the Foreign Affairs and Defense Committee.
- Relaxation of Mandatory Helmet Requirement for Cyclists – This law significantly narrows the law enacted by the 17th Knesset that made cycling without a helmet a criminal offense. Under the new law, only those engaging in interurban and extreme sports cycling as well as children and juveniles are required to wear helmets. Together with MK Shelly Yachimovich.
- Law of Entry to Israel (Extension of Work Permit for a Foreign Caregiver) – Enables a foreign caregiver, under certain circumstances, to remain in Israel beyond the expiration date of their work permit. Together with MK David Azoulay.
- Amendment to the Traffic Ordinance (Duty to Provide Information on the Pledge of a Vehicle) – Provides that when transferring ownership of a vehicle, an automatic check will be made for information about the existence of a pledge on the vehicle. Together with MK Gideon Ezra.
- Municipal Tax Exemption for Institutions for the Rehabilitation, Training, or Employment of Handicapped Persons – Together with the members of the Hadash faction.

==== Workers' rights ====
- Employees Notification Law – An amendment ensuring that employees of manpower contractors receive information about the terms of the contract under which they are employed. This law is intended to correct situations where employees are not informed of the terms that were agreed upon between the contractor and the actual employer, and to ensure that employees are informed at the start of their employment of the contractor's employment terms with the actual employer. The law requires that employees be provided with the information needed to realize their rights. Together with MK Haim Oron.
- Law for Amendment of the Mandatory Tenders Law (Prohibition of Discrimination Due to Age) – intended to prevent discrimination against a person in a tender process due to their age. This generally refers to discrimination against the elderly, who are at risk of prejudiced and discriminatory treatment compared to younger contenders for the tender. Together with MK Zeev Bielski.
- Prevention of Cyclic Dismissals – Prevents the engagement of employees under a contract for a fixed period, at the end of which they are dismissed and then rehired, in a cyclic manner, enabling employers to avoid their obligation to secure their employees' social benefits, including severance pay. Together with MK Shlomo Molla and MK Shelly Yachimovich.
- Prohibition on Taking Securities from Employees – Under the law, employers who take securities—checks, cash, or deposits—from their employees are subject to imprisonment or a fine. The law also applies to employees of contractors. Together with MK Shelly Yachimovich.
- Inclusion of Prohibition on Discrimination on the Basis of Sexual Orientation, Parenthood or Pregnancy by the Employment Service – expands the scope of the prohibitions on discrimination by the Employment Service. Together with the Women's Lobby, MK Nachman Shai and MK Afou Agbaria.
- Grant of Authority to the Labor Court to Extend Filing Deadlines – to allow the Labor Court to extend the deadlines for submitting court claims against the National Insurance Institute and appeals against its decisions. Until now, the law did not allow the court to extend these deadlines for any reason.
- Labor Laws Enforcement Law – A private member's bill adopted by the government and passed as a government bill. It contains protection mechanisms for employees of contractors, albeit thus far only in the cleaning, guarding and catering sectors. This is a further development of the Responsibility of a Purchaser of Services for the Rights of the Service Contractor's Employees, which imposes responsibility for protecting the rights of a contractor's employees not only on the contractor who is their employer but also on the institution that purchased the services. The law was prepared for the second and third reading toward the end of the 17th Knesset and gave birth to the government bill.

==== Women's rights ====
- Extension of Maternity Leave to 14 Weeks – MK Khenin was the first to initiate the law, which extended maternity leave to 14 weeks.
- Income Support Benefits for Battered Women in Shelters – Battered women's shelters cannot serve the State as an alibi for divesting itself of responsibility. Women in these shelters need income support more than anyone, as they have no other source of income and arrive at the shelter penniless. Together with MK Zehava Galon.
- Prohibition on Advertising Prostitution Services – takes aim at the economic foundations of the prostitution industry. Together with MK Orit Zuaretz.
- Guarantee of Alimony Payments to Women Traveling Abroad – forbids withholding alimony payments from the National Insurance Institute to a woman who travels abroad. Together with MK Faina Kirshenbaum.

==== Children's protection ====
- Amendment to the Juvenile Law (Trial, Punishment and Treatment) (Alternative Processes) – Instead of sending juvenile delinquents to jail, where they will receive training as future criminals, the law provides for alternative processes in which the youth assume responsibility for their actions and engage in remedial activity within various frameworks. Experience around the world shows that this approach is more just and more effective. Together with MK Zevulun Orlev.
- Law for the Provision of Information to Parents – Establishes the right of both separated parents of a child to receive information about the child. Together with MK Yariv Levin.
- Law to Extend the Activity of the Fund for At-Risk Children and Youth – The Fund for At-Risk Children and Youth was originally established as a means of dealing with the spread of poverty, economic hardship and social problems among children and youth after child allowances were cut. Over the years, the fund has developed a range of activities to aid children and youth at risk and has garnered widespread praise. The fund was initially established under a temporary order due to expire in 2007. The law extended the fund's activity for another year.
- Law to Prohibit the Sale of Lottery Tickets to Minors – prohibits the sale of lottery tickets to minors to protect them from gambling addiction and wasting large sums of money. Together with MK Ahmed Tibi.
- Prohibition on Cigarette Vending Machines – The law is intended to reduce the accessibility to youth of cigarettes and smoking products. Together with MK Uri Ariel.

==== Environmental protection and health ====
- The Polluter Pays Law – updates and amends all the environmental laws. It contains advanced mechanisms for the economic punishment of polluters, including administrative and criminal penalties. It increases the punishment for bodies that pollute without a pollution permit and establishes a collection mechanism for bodies that pollute within the framework of the law. This mechanism is intended to encourage factories to switch to cleaner technologies.
- Clean Air Law – approved in the first reading by the 16th Knesset, and reformulated in the 17th Knesset with Khenin's active involvement. This law fully regulates, for the first time in Israel, discharge of pollutants into the air, tightening the ring around polluting industries.
- Environmental Enforcement Law – Confers broad search and investigation powers on inspectors of the Ministry of Environmental Protection, and for the first time subjects the different security bodies to civil enforcement.
- Environmental Enforcement Law – Powers of Local Authority Inspectors – Empowers local authorities to enforce environmental laws, thereby simultaneously achieving two important goals – the one, environmental (increasing enforcement of environmental laws), and the other, social (injecting fine moneys collected from environmental polluters directly into the coffers of the local authorities whose residents are the main victims of pollution).
- Law to Reduce Air Pollution from Transportation (Amendment 84 to the Traffic Ordinance) – The law creates a clear division of power between the government and the local authorities, putting an end to an impossible situation in which either side could paralyze initiatives of the other. The amendment obligates local authorities to act to reduce air pollution caused by transportation in every case where there is a high level of air pollution.
- Environmental Transparency Law – Duty to Report the Discharge of Pollutants – The law establishes a requirement of transparency over the discharge of pollutants into the environment, imposes on factories detailed reporting duties, sets up a register of discharged pollutants and mandates the publication of the data to the public. Experience has shown that environmental reporting duties change the behavior of polluting factories and that environmental transparency is a major democratic tool for mobilizing the public to act against pollution and pollutants. Evasion of reporting will be a criminal offense and will also result in significant administrative-financial penalties.
- Energy Efficiency in Public Buildings – Establishes a comprehensive mechanism for reducing energy use in the public sector. Among other measures, every public institution must follow a defined plan for the reduction of energy consumption. The law also lists a series of energy-saving measures, including the installation of energy-efficient light bulbs, replacement of electricity-guzzling equipment and implementation of a procedure for the economic use of electric equipment. Together with MK Nitzan Horowitz and MK Orit Zuaretz.
- Duty to Install Water-Saving Devices in Public Buildings – Mandates the installation of water-saving devices, including flow regulators ("chaschamim"), in all public buildings. Together with MK Ofir Akunis.
- Law for the Protection of the Gulf of Eilat Coastal Environment – The law for the first time extends the scope of the Coastal Environment Protection Law, which applies to the Mediterranean coast, to include the coast of the Gulf of Eilat.
- Kinneret Protection Law – The law extends the scope of the Coastal Environment Protection Law to include the shores of Lake Kinneret (Sea of Galilee), and establishes an authority (the Kinneret Conurbation) that is responsible for protecting the Kinneret and its shores.
- National Mine Action Authority Law – Establishes an authority with responsibility for clearing hundreds of minefields that are scattered throughout Israel. Together with MK Tzahi Hanegbi, MK Roni Bar-On and a group of MKs.
- Prohibition of Driving on Beaches – Establishes clear prohibitions and definitions with respect to driving on beaches, clarifies the penalties for violations of the law, and creates effective and modern enforcement mechanisms to deal with this phenomenon.
- New Deposit Law – Assigns direct responsibility to manufacturers, based on the principle of "the polluter pays".
- Municipal Tax Exemption for Field Schools Law – Serves as a means for aiding environmental education institutions. Together with MK Zevulun Orlev.
- Electronic Waste Recycling – A law that originated in two similar private members' bills submitted by MK Khenin and MK Nitzan Horowitz. Subsequently, a government bill was submitted that adopted the main points of these bills. The law, which is predicated on the principle of "the polluter pays," provides for extended producer responsibility for the treatment and reduction of electronic waste that can cause soil and groundwater contamination, and makes arrangements for the collection and recycling of purchased appliances.

==== Animal protection ====
- Prohibition on Import of Animal-Tested Cosmetics and Detergents – The law prohibits importing into Israel cosmetic/cleaning products, not for health purposes, and detergents that were tested on animals during their production. Together with MK Eitan Cabel and MK Nitzan Horowitz.
- Prohibition on Declawing Cats Other than for Medical Reasons – The declawing prohibited by the law is generally performed by cat owners who want to protect their home furniture. This is an irreversible surgical procedure that causes the animal great pain. Together with MK Eitan Cabel.
- Law for Neutering and Spaying Dogs – The purpose of the law is to deal in the most humane way with the phenomenon of the thousands of stray dogs abandoned every year to suffer from abuse or die a painful death, by encouraging dog owners to neuter or spay their pet in order to prevent unwanted births. Under the law, whoever neuters or spays their dog will recover the cost within two years by means of a discount on the dog license fee. Together with MK Eitan Cabel.

=== Knesset committees and lobbies ===
Throughout his tenure spanning the 17th to the 20th Knessets, Khenin was a prominent member of several parliamentary committees and caucuses. He served continuously on the Internal Affairs and Environment Committee from 2006 to 2015. He also held leadership roles as the chair of the Joint Committee for Health and the Environment during the 18th Knesset, and the Subcommittee for Public Transportation during the 20th Knesset. His diverse committee memberships included the Economic Affairs Committee, the Science and Technology Committee, the Committee on the Status of Women and Gender Equality, and the Special Committee for the Rights of the Child.

In addition to his committee assignments, Khenin was highly active in establishing and leading parliamentary lobbies. He chaired the Social-Environmental Lobby consecutively across four Knessets. Reflecting his broad legislative priorities, he also served as the chair for the Civil Rights Lobby, the Lobby for Direct Employment, the Lobby for Public Housing, the Lobby for Holocaust Survivors, the Lobby for Public Health, and the Lobby for Promoting Green Energy.

=== Awards and recognition ===
Throughout his parliamentary career, Khenin received numerous awards and high ratings from civic organizations for his legislative impact. In 2010, the Movement for Quality Government in Israel awarded him the Knight of Quality Government award. His legislative momentum was further recognized in 2012 when he was honored with the Outstanding Parliamentarian Award by the Israel Democracy Institute and the Green Globe Award for public figures in recognition of his environmental advocacy. Additionally, the Social Guard ranked him first among all Knesset members for his legislative record during the 2012 winter session. In 2014, his work on behalf of minors was acknowledged when UNICEF rated him as the parliamentarian most active in protecting children's rights.

== Political positions ==
Khenin described his worldview as based on three core principles:

=== Supporting social justice ===
Khenin advocates socialism, which he calls "a great change in the current unequal social-economic system, in which a minority lives in unprecedented abundance, while many are left behind. New kinds of poverty become widespread, the middle strata deteriorate, and social safety nets are being eroded". As a politician considered committed to socialist values, Khenin legislated dozens of social laws, and stood many times in support of workers' struggles. Yet he made clear on numerous occasions that his support for socialism does not mean uncritical support of the Soviet model. In 1991, as the USSR and the East-European Socialist countries were collapsing, Khenin wrote in the Communist Party's newspaper that what is needed is "neither social-democracy nor Stalinism, but a modern and revolutionary Left that can truly advance the Socialist challenge".

=== Supporting peace ===
Khenin was active in the peace movement from an early age, and was one of the first protesters against the 1982 Lebanon War. After his election to the Knesset, he continued to criticise the wars in Gaza and the 2006 Second Lebanon War. In his opinion, "for Israel, achieving peace is an existential necessity. If Israel will not find a way to live with its neighbors in the great Arab and Muslim region in which we live, we don't have a future here. A true Israeli-Palestinian peace needs to guarantee justice and independence of both peoples, and should give to the Palestinian people what the people in Israel already have: an independent state".

=== Supporting Jewish-Arab partnership ===
As a teenager, Khenin was a member of a joint Jewish-Arab youth movement, and as a student he was active in a joint Jewish-Arab student club called CAMPUS. Having been elected to the Knesset on the list of Hadash, and afterward in the Joint List, he continued to stress that Jewish-Arab partnership is a cornerstone in his worldview: "The reality in Israel continues to separate between Jews and Arabs, yet the interest of both our peoples lies in creating a partnership that would transform this country into a just and secure place for all. Clearly, Jewish-Arab partnership means swimming against the tide, both among Jews as well as among Arabs. Yet we must swim against the tide of racism and xenophobia, and I am certain that if we work right, we can also change its direction".

=== Relation to Marxism and Communism ===
As a teenager, Khenin was a member of the Young Communist League of Israel. He later joined the Communist Party of Israel and was elected to its leading bodies. In the late 1980s, he harshly criticized the "deformations in the Soviet regime, which are the result of Stalinism". He called Stalinism a terrible deformation of the Communist ideal, and in 2009 said, "I believe Stalin was the worst disaster of 20th-century socialism. But I still believe in the ideal of transforming our world". He added, "Communism, for me, is a form of horizon: It is a different kind of society, a different kind of division between people... Capitalism wants to establish the rule of profit over everything in life: economy, education, health, the environment. Socialism means the opposite: to try and free as many of these domains from the rule of profit. The Socialism that I aspire to means liberating politics from big capital, and expanding democracy to encompass all walks of life".

== See also ==
- Ofer Cassif
