= Tamar Gozansky =

Israeli communist politician

- תמר גוז'נסקי
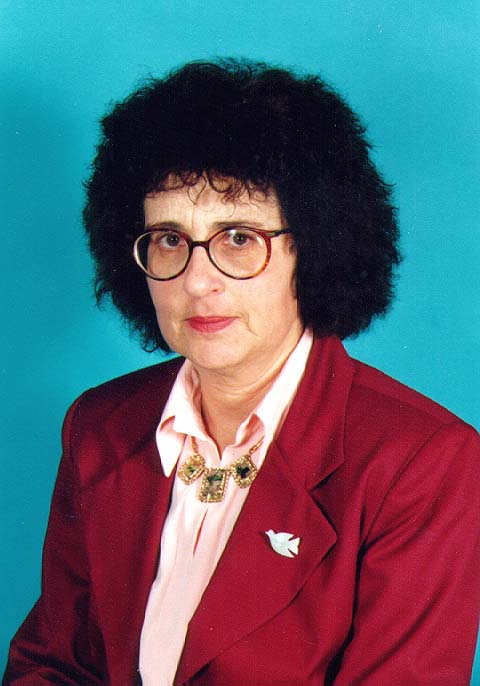

Faction represented in the Knesset
- 1990–2003: Hadash

Personal details
- Born: October 3, 1940 (age 85) Petah Tikva, Mandatory Palestine

Tamar Gozansky (Hebrew: תמר גוז'נסקי, also spelt Tamar Gozhansky; born October 3, 1940) is an Israeli politician.

== Biography ==
Tamar Gozansky was born in Petah Tikva in 1940 to a Russian Jewish family. She earned an MSc in Economics from Leningrad State University. She later worked as an economist.

== Political career ==
Gozansky joined the Communist Party of Israel, the major part of the Hadash alliance. She entered the Knesset in July 1990 as a replacement for veteran Hadash MK Tawfik Toubi and retained her seat in the 1992 elections, after which she chaired the Knesset's joint committee on early childhood.

She was reelected in 1996, and again chaired the joint committee on early childhood. Following a third re-election in 1999 she became chairwoman of the committee on the rights of the child and the special committee for school dropout rates.

Prior to the 2003 election, Gozansky announced that she would not seek re-election, which required a special majority of the party for its veteran representatives in the Knesset.

== Works ==
=== Books ===
- Economic Independence – How?: Summaries of Israel’s Economic Development 1948–1968. Tel Aviv: Iyun, 1969.
- What is Communism? (Hebrew translation by Gozansky). Tel Aviv: Iyun, 1976.
- The Development of Capitalism in Palestine. Haifa: University Publishing Projects, 1986.
- Bread and Work: The Israeli Working Class – Contemporary and Historical Perspectives. Haifa: Pardes, 2013.
- Between Dispossession and Exploitation: Arab Wage-Earners – Conditions and Struggles. Haifa: Pardes, 2014.
- Mizrahi Communists: The Campaign Against Ethnic Discrimination and for the Right to Housing. Haifa: Pardes, 2018.

=== Edited volumes ===
- Arise, ye Workers from your Slumber – Life and Collected Works of Eliyahu (Alyosha) Gozansky (1914–1948). Haifa: Pardes, 2009.
- Against the Mainstream! The Communist Party of Israel (CPI) 1919–2008: Articles and Posters (Co-editor with Dr. Angelika Timm). Tel Aviv: Rosa Luxemburg Foundation, 2009.

== Personal life ==
Gozansky was married to Yoram Gozansky, a leader in the Communist Party of Israel from 1961 until his death in 2025. She has 2 children: Eli, a computer expert and Dr. Yuval Gozansky, a scholar of children's media and Chair of the Communications Department at Sapir Academic College. She resides in Bat Yam.
