= Afu Agbaria =

Israeli Arab politician

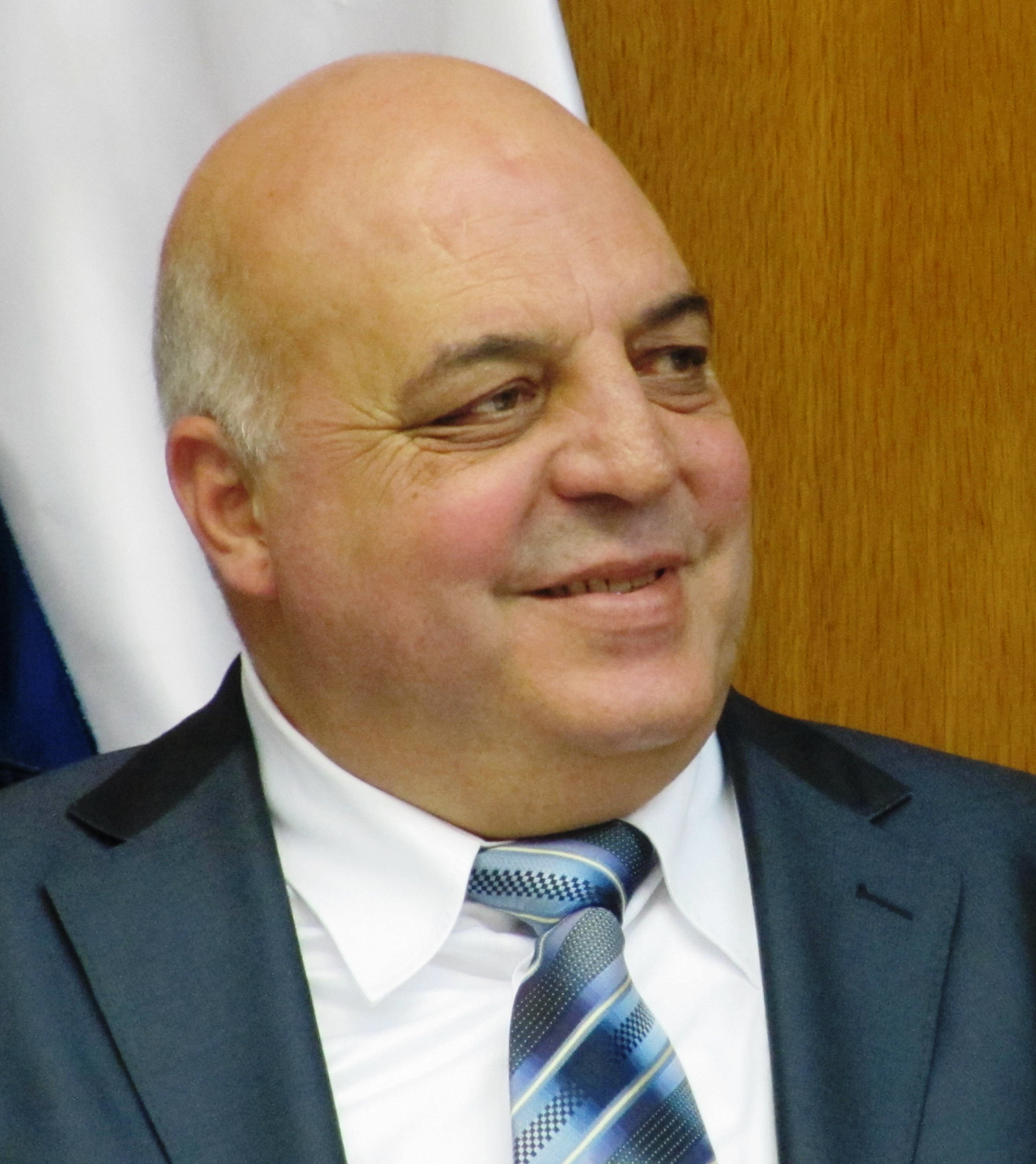
- Agbaria in 2009

Faction represented in the Knesset
- 2009–2015: Hadash

Personal details
- Born: 13 May 1949 (age 77) Umm al-Fahm, Israel

Afu Agbaria (Arabic: عفو إغبارية, Hebrew: עפו אגבאריה; born 13 May 1949) is an Israeli Arab politician and surgeon who served a member of the Knesset for Hadash from 2009 to 2015.

== Biography ==
Born in Umm al-Fahm, Agbaria studied medicine at Saint Petersburg State University, where he qualified as a doctor. He later worked as a surgeon.

A member of Maki's political office, prior to the 2006 elections he won fourth place on the Hadash list. However, he missed out on a seat as the party won only three mandates. He remained in fourth place for the 2009 elections, and entered the Knesset as the party increased its representation to four seats. On 15 June 2010 Agbaria attended a meeting of the European Parliament, where he called for Israeli leaders to be tried at the International Criminal Court, and accused Israel of attacking "its neighbors and its Arab citizens nonstop" during its 62 years of existence. He was re-elected again in 2013.

Prior to the 2015 elections he announced that he would not be running. He was ultimately placed 107th on the list of the Joint List, an alliance of Hadash and four Arab parties, losing his seat as the alliance won 13 seats.

Agbaria lives in Umm al-Fahm, and is married with three children. His wife was born in Ukraine.

== See also ==
- List of Arab members of the Knesset
