= Hadash =

Political coalition in Israel

Hadash חד״ש الجبهة
- Hebrew name: החזית הדמוקרטית לשלום ולשוויון
- Arabic name: الجبهة الديمقراطية للسلام والمساواة
- Secretary: Amjad Shbita
- Founded: 7 March 1977
- Merger of: Rakah; Aki; Shasi; Black Panthers (partial); Other Arab and left-wing groups
- Headquarters: Haifa and Nazareth
- Ideology: Socialism; Anti-Zionism; Communism; Israeli Arab interests; Two-state solution
- Political position: Left-wing to far-left
- National affiliation: Joint List (2015–2019; 2020–2022; since 2026)
- Colors: Red and Green
- Knesset: 5 / 120

Election symbol
- ו

Website
- www.hadash.org.il

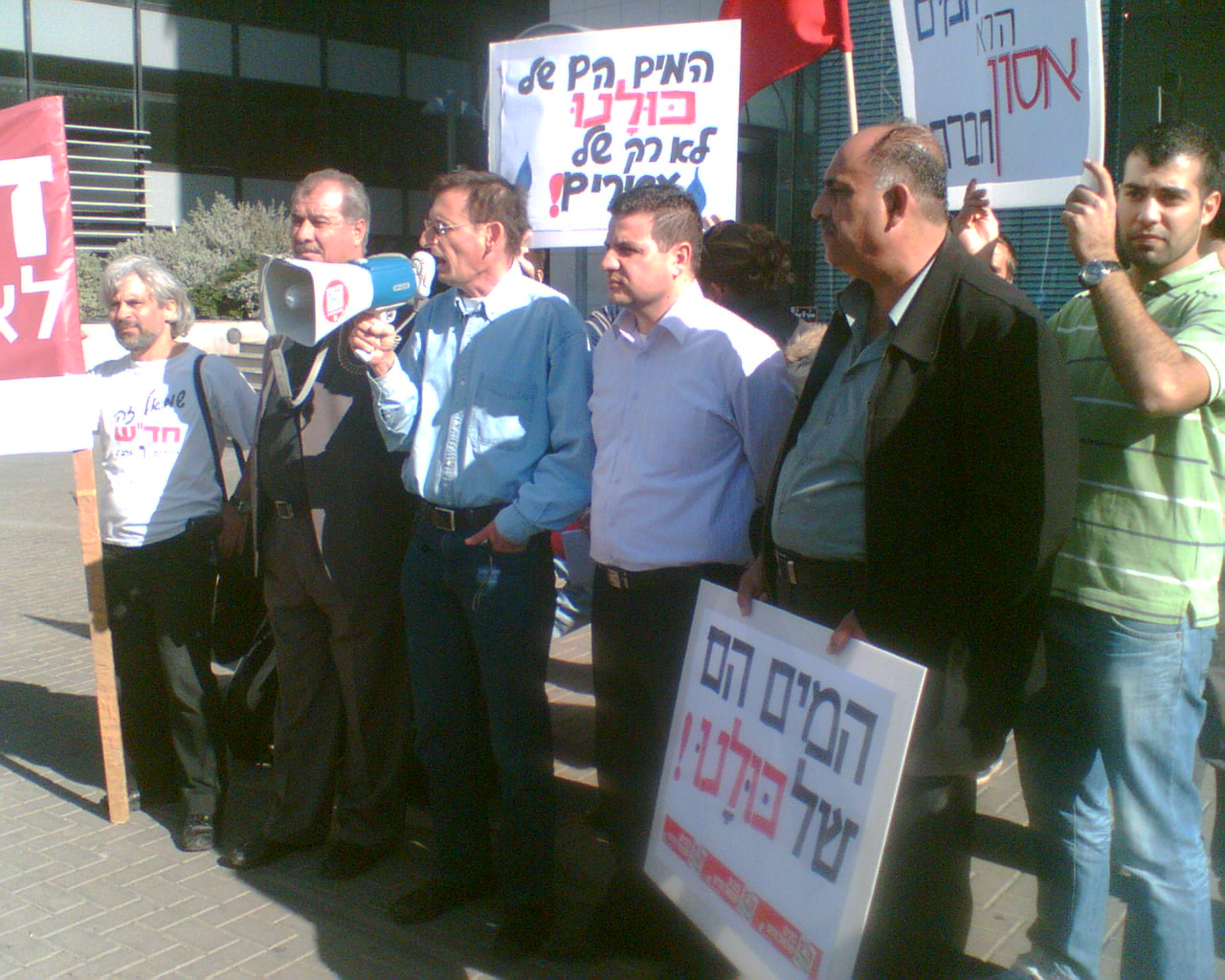
Hadash members demonstrating against water privatization in Israel. The speaker is Dov Khenin; Ayman Odeh is standing to his left and Mohammad Barakeh on his right

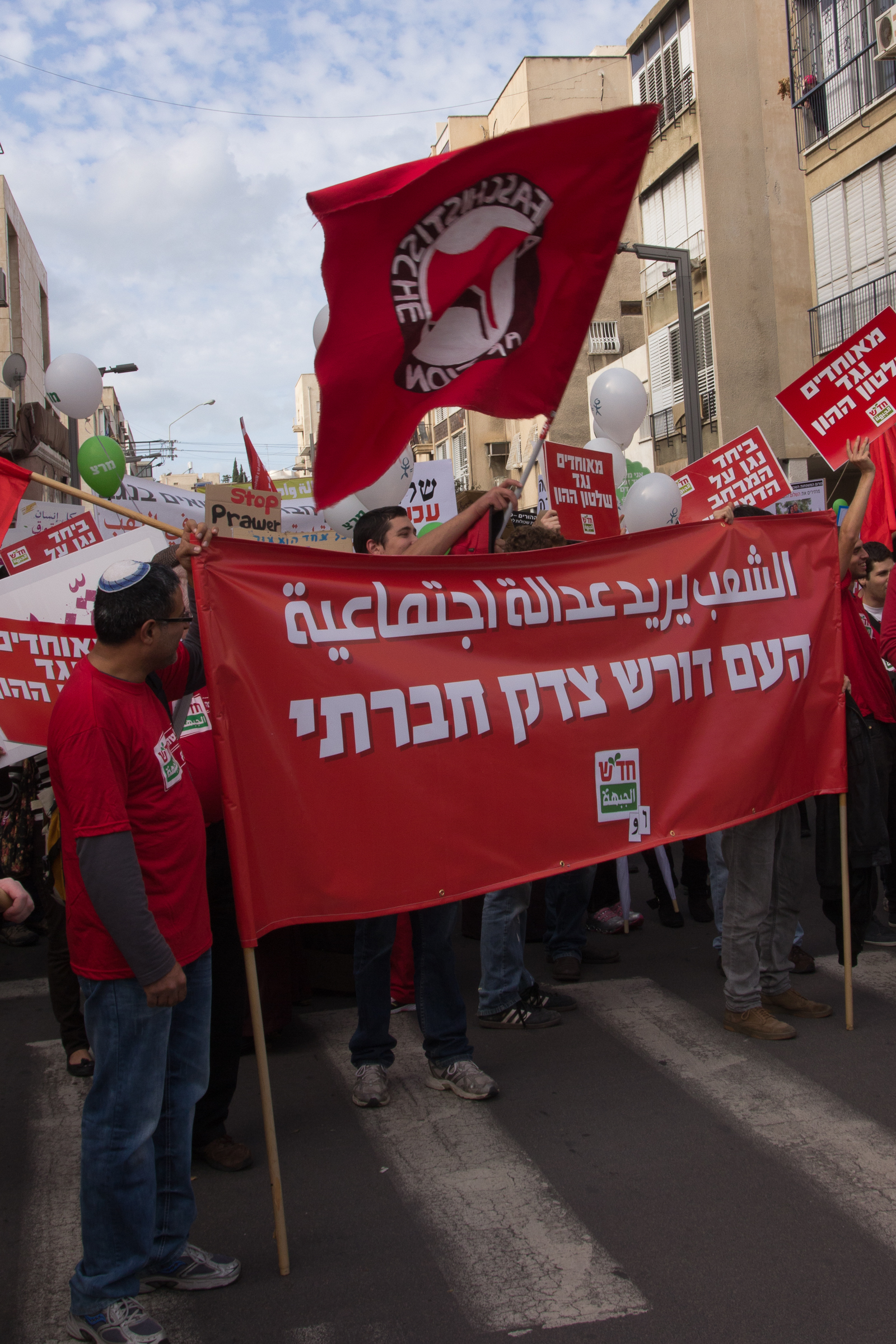
Hadash members demonstrating for social justice, Tel Aviv 2012. The banner in Hebrew and Arabic states: "The people demand social justice"

Hadash, (Note: The Hebrew name Hadash (Hebrew: חד״ש, lit. 'New') is an abbreviation of HaHazit HaDemokratit LeShalom VeLeShivion, lit. 'The Democratic Front for Peace and Equality'. Its Arabic name al-Jabhah ad-Dimuqrāṭiyyah lis-Salām wal-Musāwāt is abbreviated Aljabha, lit. 'Front') officially the Democratic Front for Peace and Equality, (Note: Hebrew: החזית הדמוקרטית לשלום ולשוויון; Arabic: الجبهة الديمقراطية للسلام والمساواة) is a left-wing to far-left political organization in Israel; the main elements of its platform are socialism and opposition to Zionism, and reaching peace in the Israeli-Palestinian conflict through the two-state solution and cooperation of Jews and Arabs in Israel. It is a part of the Joint List parliamentary faction. It was formed by the Communist Party of Israel (Maki) and other groups in 1977 as a political coalition.

== History ==
=== Foundation and original program ===
Hadash was formally established on 7 March 1977 in Tel Aviv, following a resolution by the 18th Congress of the Communist Party of Israel (Rakah) held in December 1976, in preparation for the 1977 elections. The congress called for a "broad front of all peace-loving and democratic forces" to provide a political alternative to the ruling Labor and Likud blocs. The coalition adopted the Hebrew letter "Vav" (ו) as its electoral sign.

The founding member organizations and adhering groups included:

- The Communist Party of Israel (Rakah)
- The Black Panthers of Charlie Biton's faction (several others in Saadia Marciano's faction joined the Left Camp of Israel)
- Elected local officials from Arab towns and villages
- The Israeli Left Socialists (Shasi)
- Members of various kibbutzim
- The Israeli Communist Opposition (Aki), which had been founded by former Maki leader Esther Vilenska prior to her death in 1975, and was later joined by Shmuel Mikunis.
- A circle of academics, including Daniel Amit and other public figures.

The coalition was organized under a central directing board representing all component parts to manage the election campaign and ensure ongoing cooperation. The founding declaration established a "minimum program" consisting of six core principles:

1. Just and stable peace: A settlement based on the total withdrawal of Israel from territories occupied in 1967, recognition of the Palestinian people's right to self-determination and an independent state alongside Israel, and the participation of the PLO as the recognized representative of the Palestinian people in the Geneva Peace Conference.
2. Workers' rights: Defense of the interests of workers in production and services, and the rights of residents in impoverished urban neighborhoods.
3. Equality for Arab citizens: The elimination of all forms of national discrimination and the recognition of the Arab population in Israel as a national minority with secure equal rights.
4. Elimination of ethnic discrimination: An end to communal discrimination against Mizrahi Jews, supported by the allocation of special funds to raise their socio-economic and cultural status.
5. Democratic freedoms: The protection and expansion of democratic freedoms against the threat of right-wing or fascist forces.
6. Women's rights and secularism: Securing full equal rights for women, the cancellation of discriminatory legislation, and the prevention of religious coercion to ensure freedom of opinion and faith.

=== Current formation ===
While Hadash was founded as a broad political alliance, most of its original non-communist constituent groups eventually left the coalition or fizzled out over time. The Black Panthers faction led by Charlie Biton, for example, broke away from Hadash during the 12th Knesset on 25 December 1990 to establish an independent parliamentary faction. Similarly, the Israeli Communist Opposition (Aki) gradually waned following the deaths of its principal leaders, Esther Vilenska (d. 1975) and Shmuel Mikunis (d. 1982).

Today, the structure of the Hadash coalition revolves mainly around the Communist Party of Israel and its affiliated mass organizations, alongside independent left-wing activists. The current constituent groups comprising the Front are:

- Maki (The Communist Party of Israel)
- Banki / YCLI (The Young Communist League of Israel), which serves as the youth wing of Maki.
- Tandi (Movement of Democratic Women in Israel), an affiliated socialist feminist organization.
- The Druze Initiative Committee, a leftist Druze organization, opposed the conscription of Druze into the Israel Defense Force and actively assists conscientious objectors.
- Independent non-partisan Jewish and Arab public figures, academics, activists and municipal leaders who run on the Hadash list, or support its aims, but are not formal card-carrying members of the Communist Party.

From 2008 to 2017, the joint Arab-Jewish social movement Tarabut Hithabrut operated as a faction within Hadash. The organization aimed to bridge the divide in Israeli oppositional politics by connecting campaigns against the occupation with domestic struggles for social justice and equality.

In 2018, Hadash activists were involved in creating joint Jewish-Arab movement Standing Together.

=== Electoral history ===
In its first electoral test in 1977, Hadash won five seats, an increase of one from Rakah's four. But in the next elections in 1981 the party was reduced to four seats.

Hadash's 'monopoly' as the only Arab-focused party was ended by the formation of the Progressive List for Peace in 1984. The two parties had a bitter rivalry. Hadash called for voters to 'eliminate' the Progressives. The Progressives claimed that the actions of Hadash were akin to 'fascism, Nazism, and the Gush Emunim'. Hadash accused the Progressives of being set up on the command of the PLO, as well as being CIA agents. Hadash quoted members of the Progressives as to why they refused to sign a surplus-vote agreement with them. Uri Avnery said that "the Progressive List was formed to rescue the Arabs from the Rakah prison”.

It maintained its four seats in the 1984 elections, gaining another MK when Muhammed Wattad defected from Mapam in 1988. The 1988 election resulted in another four-seat haul, though the party lost a seat when Charlie Biton broke away to establish Black Panthers as an independent faction on 25 December 1990. The 1992 elections saw the party remain at three seats.

In the 1996 elections the party ran a joint list with Balad. Together they won five seats, but split during the Knesset term, with Hadash reduced to three seats. The 1999 elections saw them maintain three seats, with Barakeh and Issam Makhoul replacing Ahmad Sa'd and Saleh Saleem.

In the 2003 elections Hadash ran on another joint list, this time with Ahmed Tibi's Ta'al. The list won three seats, but again split during the parliamentary session, leaving Hadash with two MKs, Barakeh and Makhoul.

In the 2006 elections Hadash won three seats, with Hana Sweid and Dov Khenin entering the Knesset alongside Barakeh. The party won an additional seat in the 2009 elections, taken by Afu Agbaria.

In the 2013 elections, Hadash maintained its four seats, with Barakeh, Khenin, Sweid, and Agbaria all returning to the Knesset.

Ahead of the 2015 elections, Hadash joined forces with Balad, Ta'al, and Ra'am to form the Joint List. As part of this broader alliance, Hadash increased its representation to five seats, introducing new MKs such as Ayman Odeh, Aida Touma-Suleiman, and Yousef Jabareen, alongside veteran Dov Khenin.

The Joint List temporarily fractured prior to the April 2019 elections, leading Hadash to run on a joint ticket with Ta'al. This alliance secured Hadash four seats, with Ofer Cassif entering the Knesset. The Joint List was subsequently re-established for the September 2019 and 2020 elections, yielding five seats for Hadash in both rounds. In the 2021 elections, Hadash's representation within the Joint List was reduced to three seats, held by Odeh, Touma-Suleiman, and Cassif.

For the 2022 elections, Hadash once again ran on a unified list with Ta'al, winning four seats. On 23 June 2025, Hadash MK Youssef Atauna resigned from the Knesset as part of a rotation agreement and was replaced by Ta'al MK Samir Bin Said.

For the 2026 elections, Hadash agreed to run on a joint slate with Ta'al and Balad, reviving the Joint List after the parties reached an agreement in August 2026, which is pending approval by their respective parties. Under the agreement, Yousef Jabareen will be placed first on the list, followed by Ahmad Tibi of Ta'al and Sami Abou Shehadeh of Balad.

== Policies and ideology ==
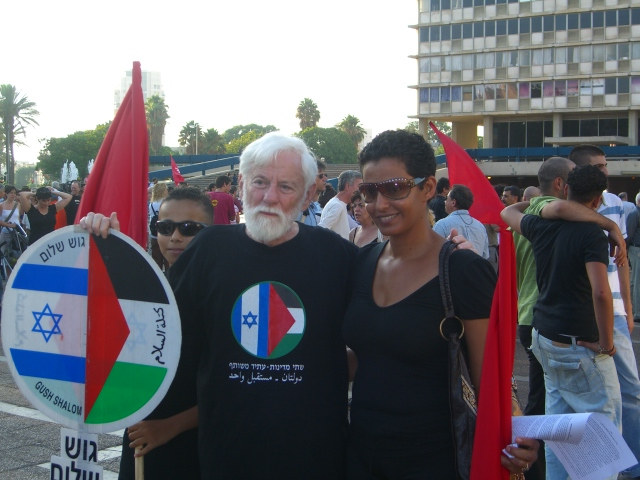
Uri Avnery at a Hadash rally against the 2006 Lebanon War.

Hadash is a left-wing party that has supported a socialist economy and workers' rights. It emphasizes Jewish–Arab cooperation, and its leaders were among the first to support a two-state solution. Its voters are principally middle-class and secular Arabs, many from the north and Christian communities. It also drew 6,000–10,000 far-left Jewish voters during national elections in the 2010s.

The party supports evacuation of all Israeli settlements, a complete withdrawal by Israel from all territories occupied as a result of the Six-Day War, and the establishment of a Palestinian state in the West Bank and Gaza Strip. It also supports the right of return or compensation for Palestinian refugees. In addition to issues of peace and security, Hadash is known for being active on social and environmental issues. In keeping with socialist ideals, Hadash's environmental platform, led in the 2010s by Maki official Dov Khenin, calls for the nationalization of Israel's gas, mineral, and oil reserves.

Indian political scientist Sunil K. Choudhary briefly refers to Hadash as to "Marxist–Leninist" based on "scientific socialism". Other sources, however, refer to it as more vaguely socialist or communist and as "the political home for thousands of Jewish voters, primarily those on the radical left who are anti-Zionist or non-Zionist." Maki which founded Hadash is also not unambigiously a Stalinist party; a part of the movement still remains Stalinist, but Khenin "made it clear" that "he and the party reject Stalinism and embrace democracy."

Hadash has called for the recognition of Palestinian Arabs as a national minority within Israel. It has in recent times included elements of Arab nationalism in its platform.

Hadash shifted to a more Arab nationalist appeal after running on a joint list with Ta'al in 2003.

In 2015, Hadash declared its support for international campaigns against companies operating in the occupied Palestinian territories.

== State response to political activity ==
Over the years, various Hadash members and leaders have faced police investigations and criminal charges linked to their participation in political protests and activity. In November 2009, former Hadash leader Mohammad Barakeh was indicted on four charges - including assaulting a photographer and interfering with a police officer - allegedly committed during anti-government demonstrations between 2005 and 2007. Barakeh rejected the charges, while civil rights groups framed the indictment as an attempt to criminalize lawful protest. Following a protracted legal battle, the Tel Aviv District Court cleared Barakeh of all remaining charges and overturned his conviction in May 2015.

More recently, MK Ofer Cassif was investigated in 2022 and subsequently indicted on suspicions of assaulting a police officer. The incident took place during a protest against evictions in the South Hebron Hills. Cassif, who maintained he was simply trying to reach a legal protest site, firmly denied the accusations.

Tensions between Hadash and law enforcement escalated noticeably following the outbreak of the Gaza war. Early in the conflict, Israel Police detained a group of prominent Arab political figures- including Barakeh, who was chairing the High Follow-Up Committee for Arab Citizens of Israel at the time. They were stopped while organizing small anti-war vigils. Authorities claimed the gatherings threatened public order and lacked proper authorization, though the detainees and their lawyers countered that Israeli law does not require permits for such small protests. Everyone was released later that day, though some were placed under temporary restrictions.

Around the same time, police repeatedly raided Hadash and Communist Party of Israel offices in Nazareth, pointing to "security considerations" and enforcement needs. According to party officials, officers confiscated political materials and briefly detained activists as part of a wider clampdown on anti-war dissent. In late 2023, police even tried to shut down a Hadash national convention in Shefa-Amr by warning the venue operators that hosting the event could result in administrative penalties. The police cited fears of potential incitement; Hadash framed the move as blatant political pressure and ultimately relocated the event.

During a July 2025 demonstration in Ness Ziona, Hadash–Ta'al chairman Ayman Odeh was physically assaulted by right-wing protesters as he arrived at the site. A magistrate court judge later criticized the police response, faulting them for failing to arrest the visible instigators despite clear video footage of the incident.

In June 2026, Barakeh was arrested again and interrogated by police, this time on suspicion of inciting terrorism. The investigation centered on a 2022 speech he gave as chairman of the High Follow-Up Committee, which authorities claimed included support for terror groups and encouraged fighting against the state. Barakeh staunchly denied the accusations, calling the arrest politically motivated. Hadash, alongside Maki and the High Follow-Up Committee, issued strong condemnations. They argued the arrest was less about security and more about criminalizing the Arab political leadership and stifling dissent over a years-old public speech. Following a hearing, the court rejected a police request to keep him in custody, releasing Barakeh with restrictive conditions that temporarily barred him from the West Bank. His supporters pointed to the court's refusal to extend his detention as proof the charges were overblown, though police noted the probe remained active.

== Election results ==
Election	Votes	%	Seats	+/–	Knesset members
1977	80,118	4.6	5 / 120	–	Charlie Biton, Avraham Levenbraun (replaced by Hanna Mwais), Tawfik Toubi, Meir Vilner, Tawfiq Ziad
1981	64,918	3.4	4 / 120	▼1	Charlie Biton, Tawfik Toubi, Meir Vilner, Tawfiq Ziad
1984	69,815	3.4	4 / 120	Steady	Charlie Biton, Tawfik Toubi, Meir Vilner, Tawfiq Ziad, Muhammed Wattad (joined from Mapam)
1988	84,032	3.7	4 / 120	Steady	Charlie Biton (left party during Knesset term), Tawfik Toubi (replaced by Tamar Gozansky), Meir Vilner (replaced by Hashem Mahameed), Tawfiq Ziad (replaced by Mohamed Nafa)
1992	62,545	2.4	3 / 120	▼1	Tamar Gozansky, Hashem Mahameed, Tawfiq Ziad (replaced by Saleh Saleem)
1996 (Note: In an alliance with Balad, which won a total of five seats)	129,455	4.2	4 / 120	▲1	Tamar Gozansky, Ahmad Sa'd, Saleh Saleem, Hashem Mahameed
1999	87,022	2.6	3 / 120	▼1	Mohammad Barakeh, Tamar Gozansky, Issam Makhoul
2003 (Note: In alliance with Ta'al.)	93,819	3.0	2 / 120	▼1	Mohammad Barakeh, Issam Makhoul
2006	86,092	2.7	3 / 120	▲1	Mohammad Barakeh, Dov Khenin, Hana Sweid
2009	112,130	3.3	4 / 120	▲1	Mohammad Barakeh, Dov Khenin, Hana Sweid, Afu Agbaria
2013	113,439	3.0	4 / 120	Steady	Mohammad Barakeh, Dov Khenin, Hana Sweid, Afu Agbaria
2015	Part of the Joint List		5 / 120	▲1	Ayman Odeh, Aida Touma-Suleiman, Dov Khenin, Yousef Jabareen, Abdullah Abu Ma'aruf, Youssef Atauna
April 2019	193,442	4.49	4 / 120	▼1	Ayman Odeh, Aida Touma-Suleiman, Ofer Cassif, Yousef Jabareen
September 2019	Part of the Joint List		5 / 120	▲1	Ayman Odeh, Aida Touma-Suleiman, Ofer Cassif, Yousef Jabareen, Jabar Asatra
2020	Part of the Joint List		5 / 120	Steady	Ayman Odeh, Aida Touma-Suleiman, Ofer Cassif, Yousef Jabareen, Jabar Asatra
2021	Part of the Joint List		3 / 120	▼2	Ayman Odeh, Aida Touma-Suleiman, Ofer Cassif
2022	178,735	3.75	4 / 120	▲1	Ayman Odeh, Aida Touma-Suleiman, Ofer Cassif, Youssef Atauna (replaced by Ta'al MK Samir Bin Said on 23 June 2025)
2026	Part of the Joint List		5 / 120	▲1	Yousef Jabareen, Faten Ghattas, Ofer Cassif, Youssef Atauna, Nihaya Washahi

== Leaders ==
Hadash’s leadership structure includes both a chairperson, who serves as the coalition’s political head, and a secretary-general, who is responsible for organizational and operational leadership.

=== Chairpersons ===
Portrait	Name	Term	Notes
Meir Vilner	Meir Vilner	1977–1992	Founding chairman
Tawfiq Ziad	Tawfiq Ziad	1992–1994	Also served as mayor of Nazareth
Saleh Saleem	Saleh Saleem	1996–1999	
Mohammad Barakeh	Mohammad Barakeh	1999–2015	Also served as secretary-general
Ayman Odeh	Ayman Odeh	2015–2023	Previously secretary-general
Issam Makhoul	Issam Makhoul	2023–2025	

=== Secretaries-general ===
Name	Term	Notes
Tawfik Toubi	1989–1993	
Mohammad Barakeh	1993–1999	Later chairman
Odeh Bisharat	1999–2006	
Ayman Odeh	2006-2015	Later chairman
Mansour Dahamshe	2015–2023	
Amjad Shbita	2023–present	
