= Mohammad Barakeh =

Israeli Arab politician

- מוחמד ברכה
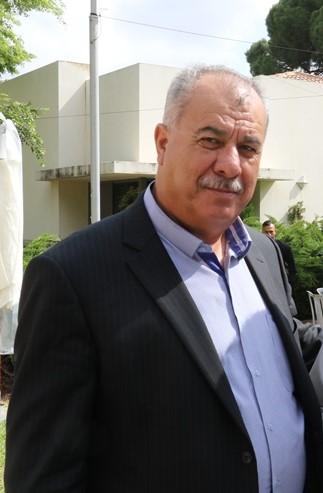

Faction represented in the Knesset
- 1999–2015: Hadash

Personal details
- Born: 29 July 1955 (age 71) Shefa-'Amr, Israel
- Party: Communist Party of Israel
- Education: Tel Aviv University
- Occupation: Politician

Mohammad Barakeh (Arabic: محمد بركة, Hebrew: מוחמד ברכה; born 29 July 1955) is an Israeli Arab politician. A former leader of Hadash, he served as a member of the Knesset for the party between 1999 and 2015. From 2015 to 2025, he served as chairman of the High Follow-Up Committee for Arab Citizens of Israel.

== Early life and education ==
Born in Shefa-'Amr, Barakeh studied mathematics at Tel Aviv University. In that time, he had formed extensive political partnerships and personal friendships with Jewish fellow students, many of which continue up to the present. The rented apartment where he lived for many years on top of an old building at Rothschild Boulevard in downtown Tel Aviv was a well-known rendezvous for political meetings. Among numerous other political actions, the first demonstration against the 1982 Lebanon War, held on the war's third day, 7 June 1982, and dispersed by police, was planned at a dramatic meeting held in Barakeh's Tel Aviv apartment.

== Career ==
Following the completion of his studies, Barakeh returned to his hometown of Shefa-'Amr, a city that has long played a prominent role in the political life of Israel's Arab community. He became active in the local branch of Maki, the main component of Hadash, and gradually emerged as one of the party's leading Arab political figures.

Barakeh was first elected to the Knesset in the 1999 elections as a member of Hadash. He was re-elected in the 2003 elections, after which he became a Deputy Speaker of the Knesset.

He retained his seat in the 2006 and 2009 elections. During this period, he served as chairman of Hadash and was one of the alliance's most prominent representatives in national politics. During his parliamentary career, he was particularly associated with advocacy for Arab citizens' rights, social justice, workers' rights and Jewish–Arab political cooperation.

Barakeh was re-elected for a fifth term in the 2013 elections. Prior to the 2015 elections, however, he announced his retirement from parliamentary politics. Although he did not seek another term, he was placed in the symbolic 120th position on the candidate list of the newly formed Joint List, an electoral alliance bringing together Hadash and the major Arab-led parties. Following his retirement from the Knesset, Barakeh remained active in public life and later served as chairman of the High Follow-Up Committee for Arab Citizens of Israel from 2015 to 2025.

=== Conflict with Baruch Marzel ===
In February 2005, Barakeh was threatened by Kahanist activist (and now-outlawed Kach party leader) Baruch Marzel over his pivotal support for Ariel Sharon's evacuation compensation bill, a move that paved the way for Israel's unilateral disengagement from the Gaza Strip and northern West Bank.

In a letter, Marzel wrote to Barakeh: "the evacuation bill was passed with your backing, and now it is only a matter of time before it is implemented on other sectors of society, including you and your friends." Marzel wrote that Barakeh's vote "in favor of expelling Jews from their homes in Gaza and the northern Samaria" would result in "appraisers [being] sent to your home to estimate its value."

=== Criminal charges ===
On 1 November 2009 he was indicted on four counts for actions taken at political demonstrations: assault and interfering with a policeman in the line of duty on 28 April 2005, assault on a right-wing activist who had been recording a left-wing protest on 22 July 2006, insulting a public servant (police officer) on 5 August 2006, and for confronting an official (police officer) who was discharging his legal duty on 7 July 2007. The crimes were punishable by jail terms ranging from six months to five years, and according to the Jerusalem Post, Barakeh was given one month to decide whether he wanted to request using his parliamentary immunity or stand trial. At least one human rights group posited that the charges were politically motivated. "Adalah, the Legal Center for Minority Rights in Israel, declared that the indictment against Barakeh was based on false testimony which Barakeh completely denied."

In 2014, he was convicted of assault, but cleared of the other charges; the charges of insulting a public servant and interfering with a police officer in the line of duty were withdrawn in 2011 as they fell under his parliamentary immunity. Barakeh was eventually fined 400 NIS and ordered to pay the assault victim 250 NIS.

=== Concentration camp trip ===
In 2010, Barakeh joined an Israeli delegation visiting World War II-era concentration camps. His inclusion in the trip was opposed by two right-wing Israeli legislators led by Danny Danon, who claimed he would use the visit to attack Israel, and who lobbied unsuccessfully to have Barakeh barred from the commemoration. The visit drew criticism from Israeli Arabs who said the timing was inappropriate due to Israeli-Palestinian tensions.

After visiting the extermination camp, Barakeh expressed great shock: "I knew exactly where I was going, but being here, faced with the embodiment of human evil on the one hand, and the unperceivable misery of the victims on the other hand, things take on a different meaning. Everything is mixed into a human catastrophe." Barakeh commented on the piles of children's shoes displayed at the museum and said, "Any such shoe was once worn by a baby. Children are a nationality of their own, a nationality of innocence, and I cannot grasp how human beings could do such an atrocious thing."

== See also ==
- List of Arab members of the Knesset
