= List of Earlham College people =

The following is a list of notable people associated with Earlham College, a private liberal arts college in Richmond, Indiana.

== Notable alumni ==
=== A–M ===
- Sally Abed - Palestinian-Israeli peace activist, leader of Standing Together and a member of the Haifa city council
- Carl W. Ackerman – first head of the Columbia University School of Journalism
- Marjorie Hill Allee – author
- Warder Clyde Allee – known for research on animal behavior, protocooperation, and for identifying the Allee effect; elected to the National Academy of Sciences
- John S. Allen – founding president of the University of South Florida; interim president of the University of Florida
- Gertrude Bonnin (Zitkala-Sä) – writer, Native American activist, founded National Council of Indian Americans
- J. Peter Burkholder – musicologist and author
- Jana E. Compton – research ecologist with the Environmental Protection Agency
- Ione Virginia Hill Cowles – president, General Federation of Women's Clubs
- Garfield V. Cox – attended but did not graduate; dean of the University of Chicago School of Business, 1942–1952
- David W. Dennis – congressman from Indiana
- Juan Dies – co-founder and executive director of Sones de Mexico Ensemble; nominated for a Latin Grammy
- Joseph M. Dixon – Congressman, Senator, 7th Governor of Montana
- Liza Donnelly – cartoonist for the New Yorker
- John Porter East – former U.S. senator for North Carolina
- Brigadier General Bonner F. Fellers – General MacArthur's psychological warfare director during World War II; during the subsequent occupation of Japan, worked with fellow Earlhamite Isshiki Yuri (see below) to persuade MacArthur to preserve the institution of the Emperor and clear Hirohito of war crimes
- Jim Fowler – star of Wild Kingdom
- Lew Frederick (Lewis Reed Frederick) – member of the Oregon House of Representatives 2010–2016; member of Oregon State Senate 2017–present; Outstanding Alumni Award 2013
- Reverend Wilda C. Gafney – priest and bible scholar
- Sara Gelser – member of the Oregon House of Representatives 2005–2014 and member of the Oregon State Senate 2015–present; Outstanding Alumni Award 2016; recognized as one of Time magazine's "Person of the Year" Silence Breakers in 2017
- Andrew Ginther – mayor of Columbus, Ohio, 2016–present
- David Grosso – city council member for the District of Columbia
- Mary Haas – linguist, pioneer in the field of Siamese language studies; former president of the Linguistic Society of America
- William Hadley – established Hadley School for the Blind
- Michael C. Hall – actor on HBO's Six Feet Under and star of Showtime's Dexter, for which he was nominated for an Emmy and won Golden Globe and Screen Actors Guild awards
- Margaret Hamilton – headed the team that wrote the onboard flight software for NASA's Apollo program
- Helen Hansma – researcher emeritus and associate adjunct professor emeritus at the University of California, Santa Barbara
- Robert M. Hirsch – former chief hydrologist and head of water science for the United States Geological Survey
- Emily Caroline Chandler Hodgin – temperance reformer
- Mary Inda Hussey – Semitic text authority; first woman to teach at the American Society for Oriental Research in Jerusalem
- C. Francis Jenkins – demonstrated the first practical motion picture projector
- Henry Underwood Johnson – US congressman from Indiana
- Mary Coffin Johnson (1834–1928) – temperance activist, newspaper publisher
- Mat Johnson – novelist and screenwriter
- Robert Underwood Johnson – former US ambassador to Italy
- Andrew Johnston – film critic for Time Out New York, Us Weekly, Radar magazine; editor of the "Time In" section; TV critic for Time Out New York
- Joseph Henry Kibbey – territorial governor of Arizona
- Peter D. Klein – chaired Rutgers University's Department of Philosophy
- Frances Moore Lappé – activist and author of three-million-copy bestseller Diet for a Small Planet
- Simone Leigh – noted multimedia and ceramic artist
- Manning Marable – professor at Columbia University; author of Malcolm X: A Life of Reinvention, which won a Pulitzer Prize in 2012
- Dan McCoy – writer for The Daily Show and host of The Flop House podcast
- Robert Meeropol – founder of the Rosenberg Fund for Children, attorney, college professor and activist; son of Julius and Ethel Rosenberg
- Elephant Micah (real name Joseph O'Connell) – lo-fi recording artist
- Molly R. Morris – ecologist, professor at Ohio University

=== N–Z ===
- William Penn Nixon – publisher of the Chicago Inter Ocean and president of the Associated Press
- Larry Overman – organic chemist, member of the National Academy of Sciences
- Robert Quine – named by Rolling Stone as one of the 100 greatest guitarists of all time
- Marc Reisner – author of the books A Dangerous Place and Cadillac Desert
- Susan Porter Rose – chief of staff to the First Lady of the United States (1989–1993)
- David Rovics – singer/songwriter and activist
- Olive Rush – artist
- Rock Scully – manager of The Grateful Dead 1965–1985
- Andrea Seabrook – contributor to National Public Radio's All Things Considered and former Congressional correspondent for NPR
- David Shear – US ambassador to Vietnam
- Michael Shellenberger – conspiracy theorist and two-time California gubernatorial candidate
- William E. Simkin – helped prevent national strikes and resolved thousands of labor disputes as the federal government's chief labor mediator and as a leading private arbitrator
- Ruth Hinshaw Spray – peace activist
- Wendell Meredith Stanley – biochemist, shared a 1946 Nobel Prize for discovering methods of producing pure enzymes and virus proteins
- Edwin Way Teale – naturalist writer; won the Pulitzer Prize for General Nonfiction in 1966; elected fellow of the American Association for the Advancement of Science; staff writer at Popular Science
- Nellie Teale (1900–1993) – naturalist
- Summia Tora – Afghan activist
- Thomas Trueblood – president of the National Society of Elocutionists; his golf teams won two NCAA National Championships and five Big Ten Conference championships
- Harold Urey – received the Chemistry Nobel Prize in 1934; known for his discovery of deuterium and the Miller–Urey experiment
- Frederick Van Nuys – U.S. senator from Indiana 1932–1944
- Amy Walters – producer, National Public Radio
- Zach Warren – ran the Boston Marathon while juggling in 2 hours, fifty-eight minutes
- Newton K. Wesley – Japanese-American optometrist; early developer of commercially successful rigid contact lenses in the 1950s
- Herman Brenner White – physicist
- Don Wildman – actor and host of TV travel shows including Ushuaia, Men's Journal and Cities of the Underworld on the History Channel
- Alice Wong – writer and disability justice activist; MacArthur Foundation fellow
- Mary Chawner Woody – president, North Carolina Woman's Christian Temperance Union
- Harry N. Wright – president of City College of New York, mathematician

== Notable faculty ==
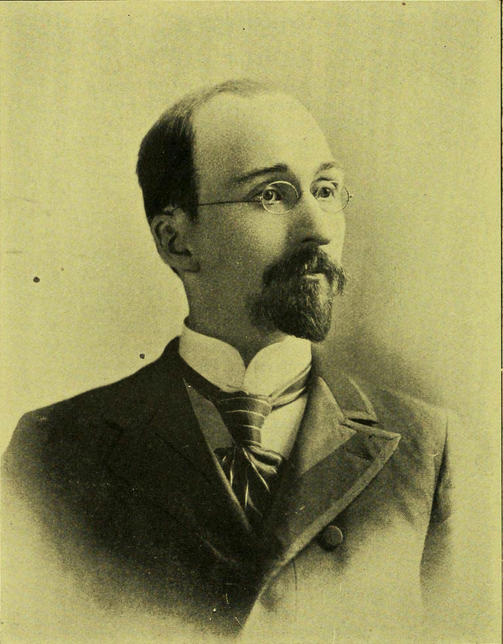
Robert Kelley, president of Earlham College

- William W. Biddle – social scientist, major contributor to the study of community development and propaganda
- Landrum Bolling – president of Earlham 1958–1973; director at large of Mercy Corps; back channel between Yasir Arafat and Jimmy Carter
- Wayne C. Booth – former professor of English; literary critic; author of The Rhetoric of Fiction and The Company We Keep
- Anna Cox Brinton – Quaker scholar and administrator
- Howard Brinton – Quaker scholar and administrator
- John Elwood Bundy – impressionist painter
- Evan Ira Farber – emeritus library director, named Academic Research Librarian of the Year in 1980
- Del Harris – former Earlham basketball coach; current NBA coach
- Anne Houtman – professor of Biology and former president of Earlham College
- Thomas R. Kelly – author of A Testament of Devotion
- Dale Edwin Noyd – decorated fighter pilot and Air Force captain who became a conscientious objector during the Vietnam War
- E. Merrill Root – poet
- Paul Sniegowski – professor of Biology and president of Earlham College
- Peter Suber – professor of Philosophy emeritus, creator of the game Nomic, and a leader in the open access movement
- D. Elton Trueblood – Quaker author and theologian
