= Devesa =

Devesa is a surname. Notable people with the surname include:

- Didac Devesa (born 1990), Spanish footballer
- Domènec Ruiz Devesa (born 1978), Spanish politician
- Jorge Devesa (born 1988), Spanish footballer
- Susan Shaw Devesa (born 1944), American cancer epidemiologist

== See also ==
- Devesas Factory Warehouse
