= High Follow-Up Committee for Arab Citizens of Israel =

Political organization based in Israel

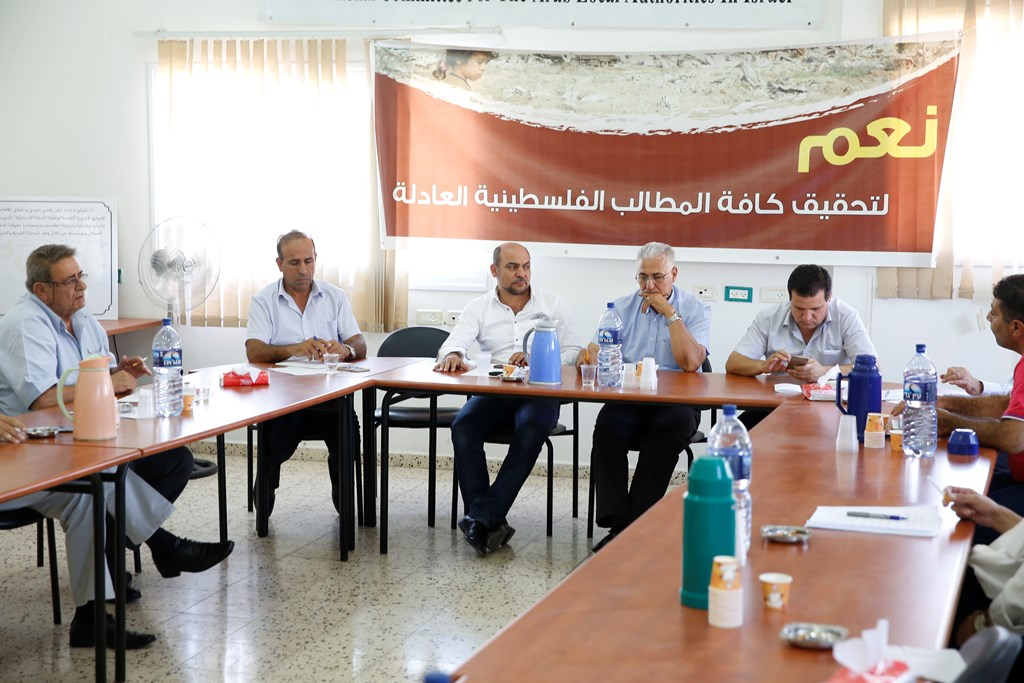

The High Follow-Up Committee for Arab citizens of Israel (Hebrew: ועדת המעקב העליונה של הציבור הערבי בישראל, Arabic: لجنة المتابعة العليا للجماهير العربية في إسرائيل, also, High Follow-Up Committee for Arab Affairs, High Follow-Up Committee for the Arab Masses in Israel, and Higher Arab Monitoring Committee) is an extra-parliamentary umbrella organization that represents Arab citizens of Israel at the national level. It is "the top representative body deliberating matters of general concern to the entire Arab community and making binding decisions." Although it enjoys de facto recognition from the State of Israel, it lacks official or de jure recognition from the state for its activities in this capacity. The National Committee of the Heads of Arab Localities (NCALC), the sole non-partisan organization representing the Arab minority in Israel, constitutes the main party in the High Follow-Up Committee (or Follow-Up Committee; its shorthand forms).

== Overview ==
The High Follow-Up Committee was established sometime between 1982 and 1984, after the events of Land Day in 1976. Members are drawn from the Arab heads of local authorities and major Arab organisations and parties in Israel. Because they do not have to submit to direct election and reach decisions by consensus, often leading to paralysis, the committee has been criticized by the community for being unwieldy and ineffective. Jonathan Cook wrote in Al-Ahram Weekly in 2006 that in recent years, there have been calls from Arab political factions for direct elections to be held for the positions in the High Follow-Up Committee, but that, "the Israeli government has intimated that it would consider an Arab 'parliament' as an attempt at secession and react harshly."

Many resolutions have been passed since the establishment of the committee. Notable among these are many declarations calling for the holding of general strikes to protest Israeli policies, and a number of these have been successfully observed.

=== Manifesto ===
The High Follow-Up Committee and NCALC published their first manifesto, The Future Vision of the Palestinian Arabs in Israel, in December 2006. The document calls for Israel to be transformed from a Jewish state that privileges its Jewish majority into "a state of all its citizens". It also calls for radical reforms to the national system of land allocation and development, which the authors charge is designed to exclude Palestinian citizens from influence.

== Membership ==
The High Follow-Up Committee was established by Ibrahim Nimer Hussein, then Mayor of Shefa-Amr, a non-affiliated politician. Hussein chaired the committee until he lost a re-election bid in 1998. The committee was in a limbo for a couple of months as he appealed against the results.

Mohammad Barakeh was the chairman of the High Follow-Up Committee for a decade. In 2025, Rula Daood, co-director of Standing Together, became the first woman to apply to be chairperson but was not able to run after several mayors who had said they would support her name appearing on the ballot withdrew their support. Jamal Zahalka ended up winning the election.

== Proposed ban ==
In 2023, right-wing Israeli lawmakers Limor Son Har-Melech, Zvika Fogel and Amit Halevi tried to ban the organization, accusing its leadership of undermining the Israeli state and supporting terrorism during the 2021 Israel–Palestine crisis by providing legal assistance to Palestinians who were detained by Israel as agitators. This was in response to allegations printed in the Makor Rishon newspaper. A representative for the office of Israel's State Attorney told the lawmakers an immediate ban was not possible before a formal criminal process against committee members was undertaken. Arab-Israeli politicians Ahmad Tibi, Waleed Alhwashla and Aida Touma-Suleiman viewed the propose ban as an intimidating attack on the Arab community in Israel.

== See also ==
- Arab Higher Committee

== Bibliography ==
- Payes, Shany (2005). Palestinian NGOs in Israel: the politics of civil society (Illustrated ed.). I.B. Tauris. ISBN 9781850436300.
- Yaniv, Avner (1993). National security and democracy in Israel (Illustrated ed.). Lynne Rienner Publishers. ISBN 9781555873943.
