= Hansma =

Hansma is a surname. Notable people with the surname include:

- Helen Hansma, American biologist
- Johan Hansma (born 1969), Dutch footballer
- Paul K. Hansma (born 1946), American physicist
