= Robert Hirsch =

Robert Hirsch may refer to:

- Robert L. Hirsch, American energy advisor
- Robert Hirsch (actor) (1925–2017), French actor
- Robert M. Hirsch (born 1949), American hydrologist
- Robert J. Hirsch (born 1949), American artist, curator, educator, historian, and author
