= Gaza war protests in Israel =

Protests in Israel beginning in 2023

- Part of the Gaza war protests
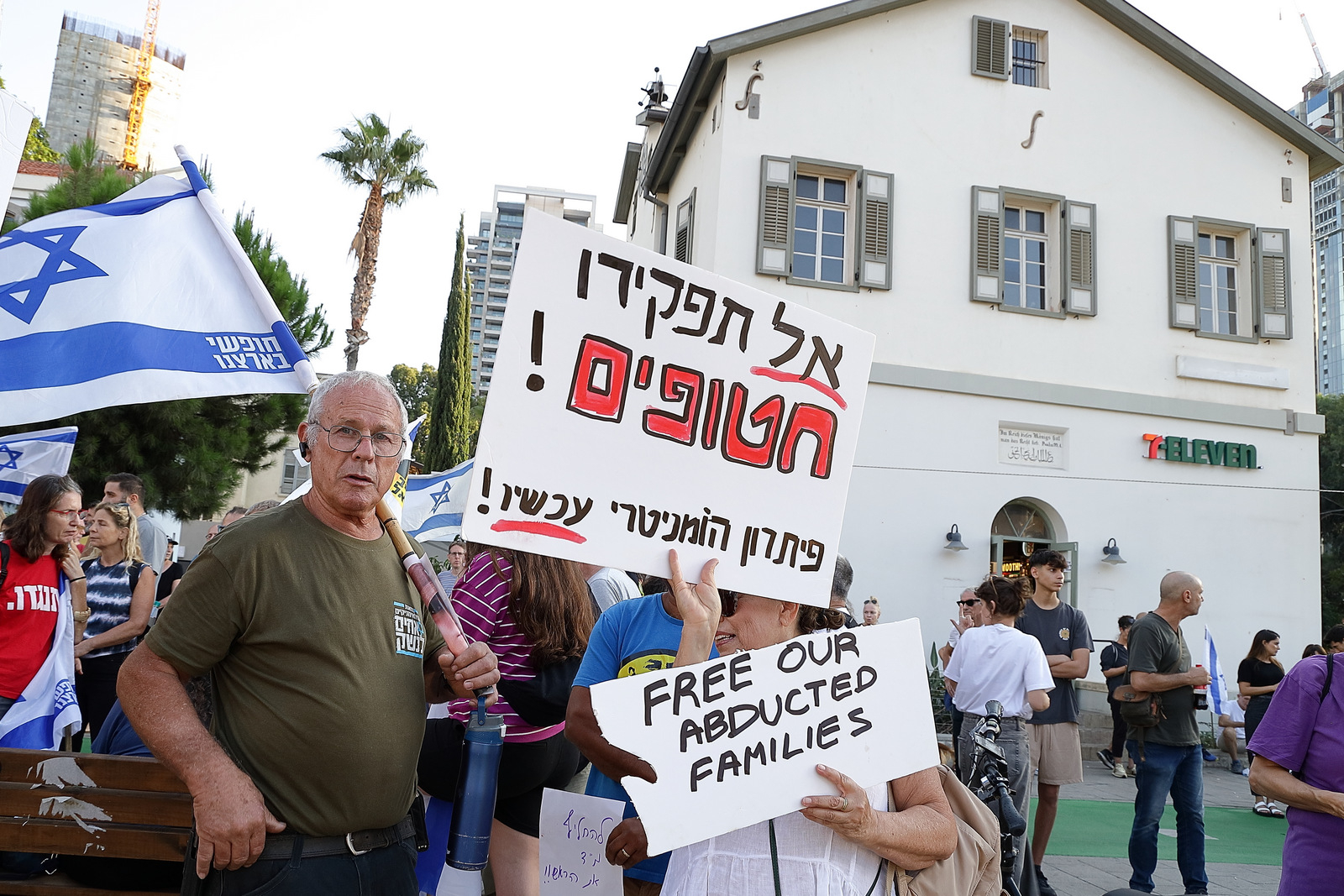
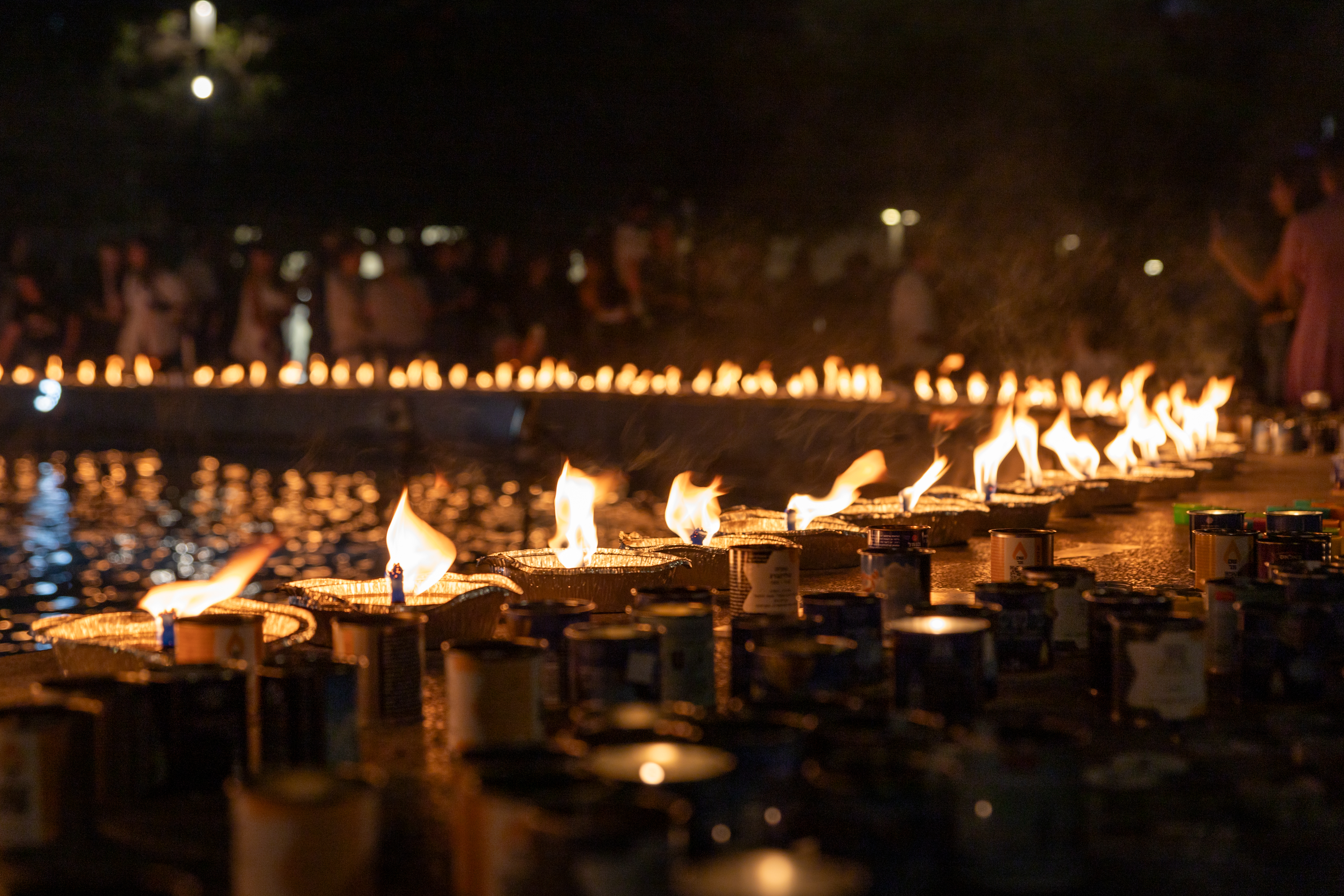
- Clockwise from top: Rally for the return of the abducted in Tel Aviv; Candlelight vigil at Dizengoff Square
- Date: 14 October 2023 – present
- Location: Israel
- Caused by: Gaza war
- Goals: Various
- Methods: Protests, demonstrations, civil disobedience, online activism

As a result of the Gaza war, nationwide protests have occurred across Israel, including rallies, demonstrations, campaigns, and vigils. These demonstrations occurred as part of broader war-related protests occurring worldwide. Israelis domestically and abroad have primarily called for the return of hostages held by Hamas.

The biggest protest movement in Israel, named "Bring Them Home Now", has demonstrated weekly in Tel Aviv near the Israel Defense Forces (IDF) headquarters. Jewish Israeli anti-war activists have been targeted by far-right groups, while Arab citizens of Israel have experienced a crackdown on free speech, with individuals arrested for social media posts and likes. By 22 December 2023, 67% of Israelis supported a ceasefire in exchange for the return of hostages held by Hamas.

== Israeli hostage deal protests ==
A hostage-solidarity rally in Tel Aviv on 14 October criticized the government's handling of the war and called on Prime Minister Benjamin Netanyahu to resign. Prisoner swaps were broadly supported amongst the Israeli population. The families of hostages were particularly critical of the Netanyahu administration's handling of the war. On 4 November, protests were held near Netanyahu's residence.

On 25 November, protesters in Jerusalem called on Netanyahu to resign. A suspected arson-originated fire was reported at a protest camp for the families of hostages; the families experienced harassment from right-wing Netanyahu supporters. On 16 December, protesters set up tents outside the Israeli Defense Ministry in Tel Aviv and stated they would not leave until the government took up hostage negotiations again. Protests against Netanyahu on 23 December in Caesarea and Tel Aviv called for new elections. Israeli public broadcaster Kan reported that "hundreds of families of the hostages in Gaza gathered in central Tel Aviv to demand the government to immediately conclude a deal to release them."

A Netanyahu speech on 25 December was met with heckles from hostage families. At an anti-government rally, former-IDF Chief of Staff Dan Halutz stated victory would only be achieved when Netanyahu stepped down.

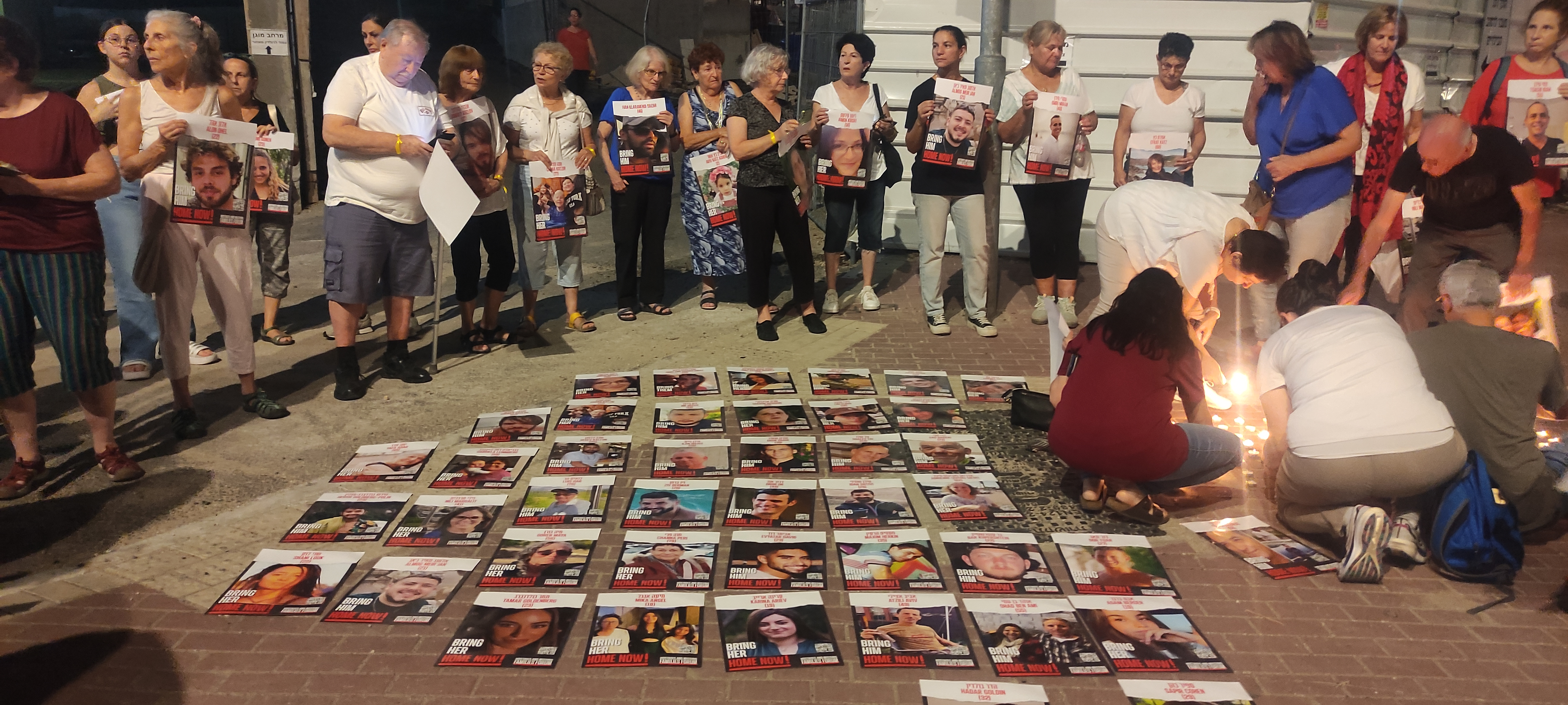
Bring Them Home protest in Gedera

At a Tel Aviv rally on 26 December, protesters called for an immediate ceasefire and stated it was the government's responsibility to get all 129 hostages back alive. On 28 December, a delegation of youth protesters from Tel Aviv traveled to Jerusalem to call for the release of the hostages. In an interview, the protest leader stated the movement's goals were a ceasefire, the return of the hostages, and "an end to the killing of innocent people in Gaza."

Bring Them Home rallies in Tel Aviv drew tens of thousands of protesters every Saturday. At the 30 December protest at Habima Square, demonstrators called for Netanyahu to be put behind bars. Habima Square became informally known as "Hostages Square". On 5 January 2024, the families of captives protested outside the home of Benny Gantz. On 13 January, protesters in Tel Aviv were arrested for blocking a freeway. Benny Gantz attended the Bring Them Home Now rally on 13 January. Isaac Herzog was loudly booed at a hostage rally in Tel Aviv. Protesters were arrested blocking a freeway in Tel Aviv. Protesters camped outside Netanyahu's residence in Caesarea on 20 January. The protesters stated they would remain encamped outside Netanyahu's residence until he agreed to a deal for the hostages' return. Relatives of the hostages stormed the Knesset chambers on 22 January. Relatives of hostages, along with other demonstrators, blocked the Ayalon Highway on 25 January.

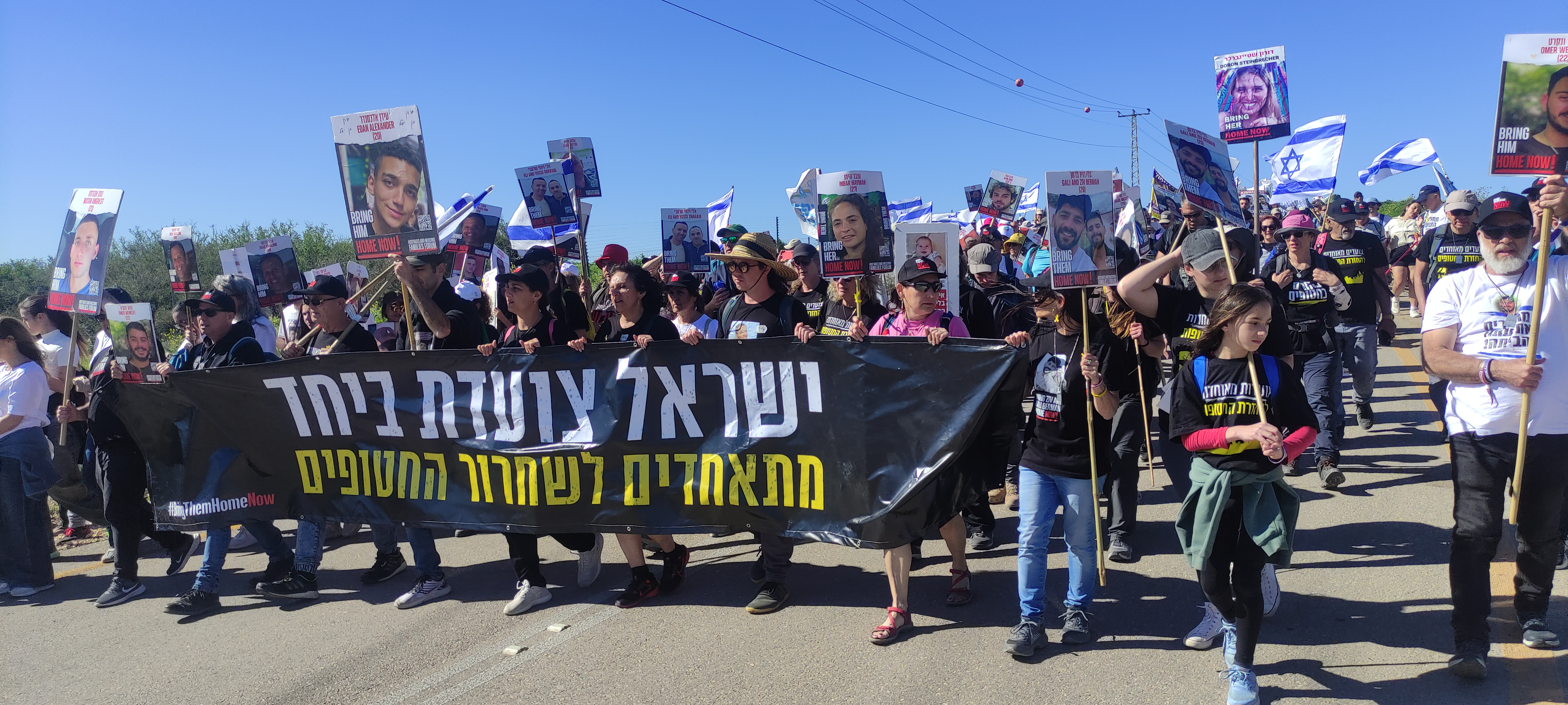
Israel March Together protest march from Re'im to Jerusalem - March 2024

Six protesters calling for the resignation of Netanyahu were arrested attempting to block roads. Protesters on 8 February held a sign that said "a deal or a death sentence" in response to Netanyahu rejecting a deal to release the hostages. Protesters were arrested for blocking a Tel Aviv highway on 11 February. Protesters blocked Begin Street in Tel Aviv on 15 February in opposition to Netanyahu pulling out of hostage release negotiations. The 17 February protests additionally saw demonstrators demanding new elections. A protester filmed Israeli police whipping an anti-government protester during the 27 February protests; Yair Lapid condemned the act as "anti-democratic". In March, an anti-war demonstrator in Tel Aviv stated, "The only victory is to stop the war, to save the lives of 20 or 30,000 more innocent Gazans and more than 100 hostages". Continued government inaction over reaching a hostage deal led several family members of the hostages to join the anti-government demonstrations on 30 and 31 March, which was followed by a four-day sit-in protest outside the Knesset.

On 6 April, during an anti-government rally in Tel Aviv, a car deliberately accelerated into a crowd of protesters, injuring five. To mark the six-month anniversary of the 7 October attack, an estimated 50,000 people gathered in Jerusalem on 7 April to demand the immediate return of hostages. Additional rallies were held that day in New York City, Berlin, London and Washington D.C. with participants joined by family members of hostages.

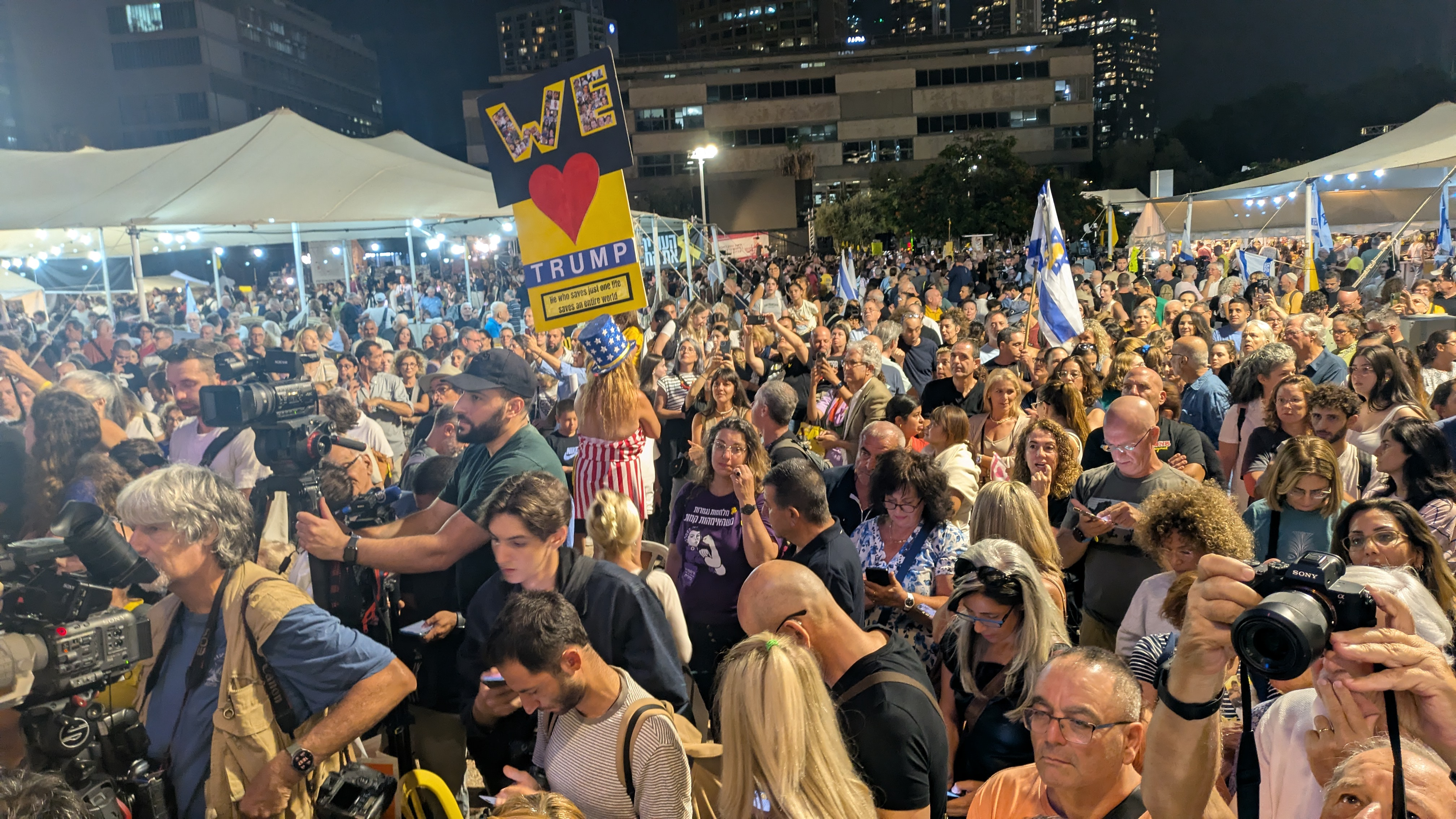
Hostages Square in Tel Aviv, 9 October 2025, following the announcement of the impending release of Israeli hostages.

In mid-May 2024, it was reported that the families of hostages continued to hold rallies in Hostages Square in Tel Aviv. Video messages from former US Secretary of State Hillary Clinton and Dr. Phil were screened at a rally, while speeches were given by the United States, United Kingdom, German and Austrian ambassadors to Israel and family members of hostages. Musical performances were seen by Montana Tucker, Noga Erez, Netta Barzilai, Lola Marsh, and Eden Golan.

On 24 July 2024, six families of hostages were arrested during the Capitol Hill protests against Netanyahu's speech in Congress. In August 2025, families of some of the hostages sailed towards the Gaza Strip in an attempt to pressure Netanyahu to end the war, with boats covered in Israeli flags, yellow ribbons and balloons and images of the hostages with loudspeakers playing their messages.

== Anti-war protests ==
On 9 November 2023, Israeli police arrested former MK Mohammad Barakeh in Nazareth for attempting to organize an anti-war protest. In an interview with Time Magazine, Barakeh described Israel's crackdowns on free speech as fascist. Israeli anti-Zionists reported hostility, threats from far-right groups, police brutality, and being perceived as "traitors".

On 18 November 2023, Israel held its first permitted anti-war protest in Tel Aviv. Two activists in Haifa were arrested for quietly protesting against the war. On 27 December, protesters from northern Israeli border towns protested in Tel Aviv, demanding to know when they would be allowed to return home. On 17 January 2024, a peaceful anti-war protest in Tel Aviv was broken up by police for "harming the feelings of the public". Palestinian and Jewish Israelis held a protest calling for the end of the war on 20 January 2024. One protester stated, "The government and the police in particular have done everything in their power to prevent [Jews and Arabs] from coming together." The protest was allowed after the organizers took it all the way to the Supreme Court.

Oren Ziv, a journalist for +972 Magazine, posted a video on social media showing police confiscating an anti-war banner on 27 January 2024 that stated "stop the genocide". On 14 February, protesters demonstrated outside Israel's Defence Ministry, calling for a ceasefire and the protection of children in Rafah. On 29 February, activists from Standing Together held up bags of flour in protest of the Al-Rashid massacre, stating, "In Gaza today more than a hundred people were killed in line for flour and food. The war and the killing of hungry and innocent people do not bring us security, they only give birth to more pain". On 1 March, protesters in Kafr Kanna called for an end to the war, to Israel's attacks on Palestinians, and to Israel's planned invasion of Rafah. On 9 March, protesters in Umm al-Fahm demonstrated in opposition to the war. Protesters paraglided over Netanyahu's home on 25 March, carrying slogans accusing him for not taking responsibility for the 7 October attack.

Five members of the Free Jerusalem movement were reportedly arrested for "protesting against the criminal attack on Gaza". In May 2024, six anti-war protesters were forcibly arrested during a Palestinian solidarity demonstration in Haifa. In June 2024, Israeli police arrested at least three antiwar demonstrators protesting against the Nuseirat refugee camp massacre.

In April 2025, thousands of Israelis held anti-war demonstrations in Tel Aviv against Israel's actions against Palestinians and holding pictures of Palestinian children who had been killed by Israel.

=== Work and school ===
Individuals who posted or expressed sentiments believed to be sympathetic toward or pro-Palestinian were suspended and censured from work and school. In one instance, a high school principal faced suspension for sharing a Haaretz article that criticised the insufficient coverage of the humanitarian crisis in Gaza on Israeli media. In another, a Palestinian doctor was probed by police for allegedly blocking her Jewish colleagues on social media. Ben-Gurion University stated it would seek more severe punishment for a Palestinian student who was ordered to perform community service after sharing a social media post challenging some of the events of 7 October. Meir Baruchin, a history teacher in Petach Tikvah, was arrested and placed in solitary confinement at a maximum security prison for a Facebook post stating, "What I am trying to do in my posts is present Palestinians as human beings." Two young women were arrested for writing "free Palestine" on a whiteboard in Meitar.

Hebrew University suspended Nadera Shalhoub-Kevorkian, a Palestinian professor of law and genocide studies, because she "signed a petition calling Israel’s actions in Gaza genocide, and an occupying entity since 1948".

According to a May 2026 Haaretz investigation, Israel's Education Ministry operated a secret surveillance body known as the "Incitement Committee" that monitored teachers' political speech and social media activity. The committee, headed by a former Shin Bet operative, collected information on teachers' professional histories, online posts, and personal data from law enforcement agencies, compiling it into "intelligence reports" without the teachers' knowledge. The investigation found that between 2023 and 2025, 157 teachers were examined, of whom 118 (75%) were Arab. The committee recommended disciplinary action against 52 teachers, with seven ultimately dismissed.

Reported cases included Arab teachers investigated over "Stop the war" social media posts, liking pro-Palestinian content, or participating in a Nakba Day march. Some Jewish educators who opposed the government or the Gaza war were also investigated. In July 2025, the Association for Civil Rights in Israel (ACRI) and Tel Aviv University's Labor Rights Clinic filed a High Court petition to end the covert monitoring, warning of a "chilling effect" on freedom of expression for tens of thousands of teaching personnel.

The Education Ministry denied the allegations, stating the committee only handled cases involving incitement or terrorism-related concerns, not political criticism. However, former ministry officials quoted by Haaretz likened the committee's practices to those of "dark regimes."

=== Conscientious objectors ===
A number of young Israelis conscientiously objected to IDF conscription in protest of the war. These "refuseniks" faced jail time for their refusal to serve. According to Amnesty International, Israel does not recognize a right to refuse military service on grounds of religion or conscience. One prominent teenage objector stated, "The criminal attack on Gaza won’t solve the atrocious slaughter that Hamas executed." Another objector stated she refused to participate in Israel's "violent policies of oppression and apartheid". A network of conscientious objectors called Mesarvot provided legal support to refuseniks. An eighteen-year-old woman was sentenced to twenty days in prison for refusing to serve due to the war on Gaza. On 28 February, Tal Mitnick, an 18-year-old conscientious objector, was sentenced to his third 45-day sentence for refusing to serve.

=== Protests in support of Gaza humanitarian aid ===
Standing Together organized a car convoy from Tel Aviv, Yafa, and Haifa to travel to the Kerem Shalom border crossing to bring humanitarian aid, stating, "The Israeli government does not allow sufficient basic humanitarian aid to get to the hungry millions in Gaza, and when a little aid does enter, battalions of settlers block it. We are not standing by anymore". In April 2024, a group of rabbis from Israel and the U.S. were arrested trying to bring food to the Gaza Strip border. In May 2024, a group of activists from Standing Together protected a humanitarian aid convoy.

In July 2025, thousands of Israelis marched to Kirya military base in Tel Aviv, demanding an end of the Gaza war and stop the starvation in the Gaza Strip. Protestors reportedly carried bags of flour and photos of children in Gaza dying from hunger during the war. Alon-Lee Green, co-director of Standing Together told Haaretz, "We cannot believe that we need to march against starvation of children and innocent people. They're understanding that this is the reality, that it's not a [fake] campaign as some journalist or politicians say. There is starvation. A lot of these Israelis are asking, 'okay, so I know there is a dire situation there. What do I do now?' This is our attempt to call on people to do something."

== Anti-Palestinian protests ==
=== Protest against humanitarian aid ===
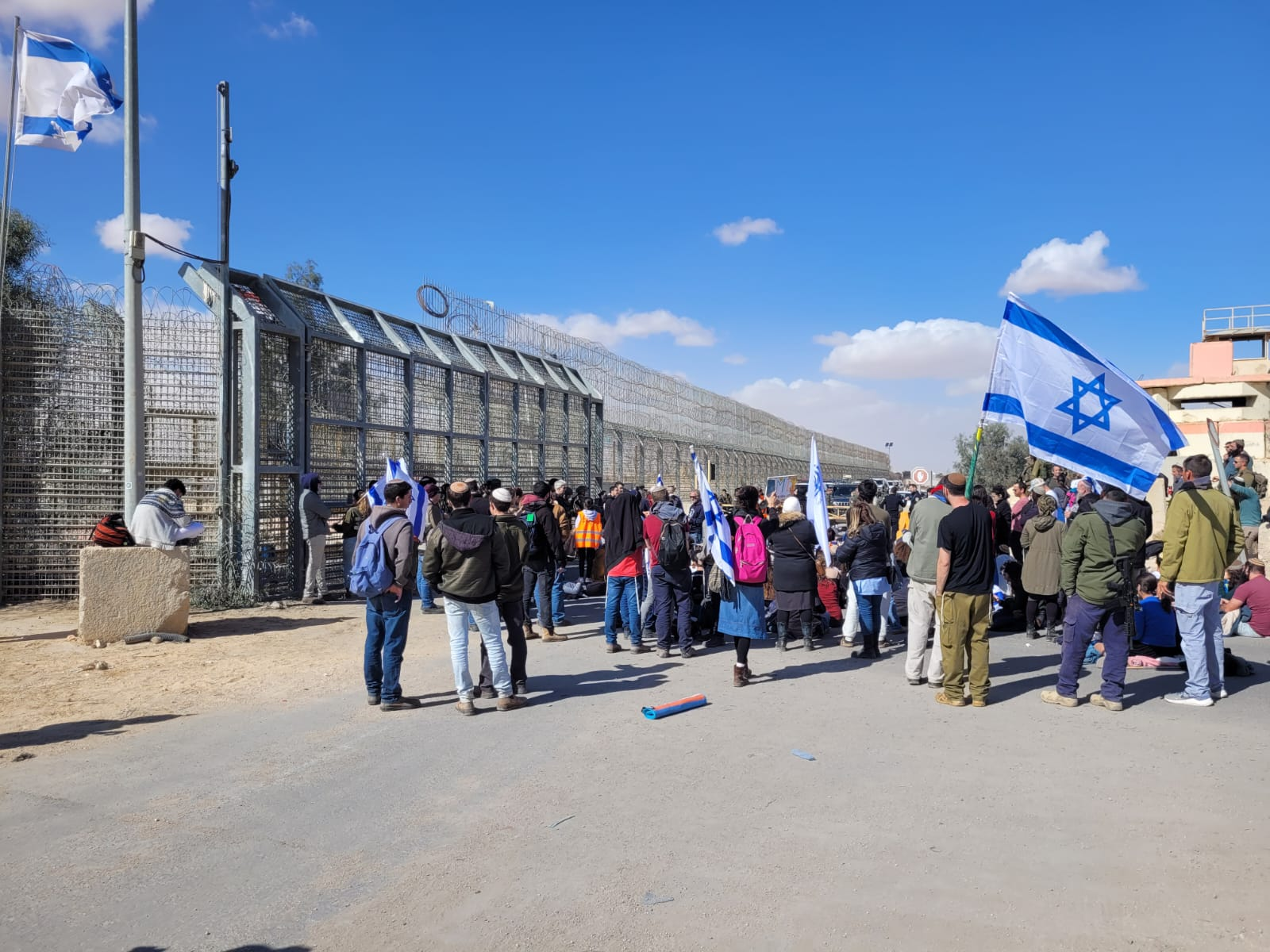
Israelis blocking humanitarian aid from entering Gaza, February 2024

On 21 December 2023, activists attempted to block the Kerem Shalom border crossing to prevent humanitarian aid from entering the Gaza Strip. On 9 January, captives' families were stopped by police trying to block humanitarian aid. On 19 January, families of captives promised "extreme actions", including blocking humanitarian aid. Hundreds protested against the entry of humanitarian aid at the Kerem Shalom crossing on 24 January 2024. Protesters again blocked aid on 25 and 26 January. On 28 January, the IDF declared the Karem Abu Salem crossing a "closed military area". Four settlers were arrested for tear-gassing and throwing rocks at aid delivery truck drivers. Protesters again blocked aid on 30 January. On 31 January, National Security minister Itamar Ben-Gvir called on Netanyahu to cease sending aid to Gaza.

30 were arrested protesting against aid for Gaza on 31 January. On 1 February, protests blocked aid trucks from leaving the Port of Ashdod. On 2 February, protesters blocked the Nitzana Border Crossing. On 6 February, Channel 12 reported that 132 aid trucks had been prevented from entering the Karem Abu Salem crossing. On 7 February, Israelis set up tents at the Karem Abu Salem to block aid from entering Gaza. Protesters blocked aid at the Nitzana border crossing on 9 February. 18 people were arrested on 11 February for blocking the Karem Abu Salem crossing. Humanitarian aid was blocked at the Nitzana Border Crossing by Israelis on 14 February. Israelis, including members of the Order 9 movement, blocked aid on 20 February at the Kerem Shalom crossing. Clashes between soldiers and Israelis attempting to block aid were reported on 22 February, with a soldier hitting a man with a rock in the back of his head. A group of settlers broke through the Erez crossing into Gaza on 29 February, demanding the recreation of Israeli settlements.

It was reported in mid March 2024, that Israeli border officers had allowed protesters to disrupt humanitarian aid convoys for weeks at the Kerem Shalom crossing. However, at the end of February 2024 it was reported that due to mounting international pressures and condemnation they have created a closed military zone, which has still attracted protestors.

Protesters blocked the Latrun Interchange to stop humanitarian aid in May 2024. The mayor of Mitzpe Ramon joined the blocking of humanitarian aid into Gaza. Four protestors were arrested from that protest, while another four including a minor were arrested at the Tarqumiyah checkpoint after a protest, with videos of the protest circulating online and showing Israeli protestors throwing supplies from the truck on the ground. A statement from the Order 9 group, which organized the protest claimed that "The aid that the State of Israel transfers goes directly into the hands of Hamas" Later the same month, Israeli settlers in the West Bank attacked a truck driver, reportedly believing the truck contained humanitarian aid.

The protesters are part of over two thirds of the Jewish Israeli population that are opposed to the sending of humanitarian aid to Gaza, per a February 2024 survey done by the Israeli Democracy Institute. Israeli military and police officers were reportedly tipping off the activists and settlers on the location of the humanitarian aid trucks.

=== Anti-Arab Netanya protest ===
On 28 October, a mob of far right Israelis gathered at Netanya Academic College chanting “death to Arabs” at Palestinian students living in the campus dormitories who they claimed had thrown eggs on Jewish girls. Israeli police blocked the far-right protestors.

=== Pro-war protests ===
In January 2024, a video of IDF reservists protesting while on active duty went viral, showing the soldiers displaying a banner on their armored vehicles criticizing the government for not attacking Gaza with more intensity. Students in Petah Tikva protested the return of a teacher who had criticized the Israeli military, with the school principal stating she couldn't "guarantee the teacher's safety". Harbu Darbu, a pro-war song that urged the bombing of Gaza and threatened Bella Hadid and Dua Lipa, reached the top of the Israeli charts.

=== Sde Teiman rape protests ===
In July 2024, far right Israeli protestors stormed military bases in support of soldiers who were arrested for allegedly sexually abusing detainees at the Sde Teiman detention camp. According to investigative Israeli military policemen, IDF reservists also attacked the policemen coming to arrest the soldier suspects. The Israeli military base protesters were joined by Knesset members and at least two government ministers. They stormed the facility's gates chanting "shame" and unsuccessfully tried to break into both Sde Teiman and the Beit Lid military base. Hanoch Milwidsky, when asked whether it was legitimate "to insert a stick into a person's rectum," replied, "Yes! If he is a Nukhba, everything is legitimate to do! Everything!" The protests were described as rallies for Israeli soldiers' "right to rape" Palestinian detainees.

== Other protests ==
On 6 February 2024, right-wing Israelis held a protest opposing the United Nations in East Jerusalem. In August 2024, the Israeli military extended the closed area around the Gaza border, following reports that settler activists were planning a Tisha B'av prayer demonstration.

On 25 June 2026, a group of 200 people gathered a demonstration that was organized by the Hadash party and its allies on Kaplan Street in Tel Aviv to protest against Israeli settler violence and Israel's continued occupation of the West Bank. Nine people were later arrested by Israeli police, stating that the protest had taken place without authorisation and accused the protestors of "disrupt public order and block the roadway".

== Government response ==
On 15 October 2023, communications minister Shlomo Karhi proposed emergency regulations allowing for the arrest of individuals who hurt "national morale." Following a rally in support of Gaza in Haifa, police commissioner Kobi Shabtai threatened to send antiwar protesters to the Gaza Strip on buses. On 8 November, the Israel Supreme Court allowed police to bar all anti-war protests.

The Knesset criminalized the "consumption of terrorist materials" on 8 November. Civil rights groups criticized the bill, stating it "invades the realm of personal thoughts and beliefs." On 2 December, an attorney at Adalah, an Israeli legal center, stated law enforcement was using the law to surveil and silence individuals, while Association for Civil Rights in Israel said it was "unprecedented in democratic countries." On 23 December, The Intercept stated the IDF had barred the media from reporting on eight subjects in Israel.

On 20 November, Israeli public broadcaster Kan posted and shortly after deleted a video produced by a private NGO, showing children who were evacuated from Gaza envelope settlements singing "we'll eliminate them all and go back to plowing our fields". On 23 November, communications minister Shlomo Karhi proposed defunding the newspaper Haaretz due to its "defeatist and false propaganda." On 23 November, ahead of the hostage-swap, National Security Minister Itamar Ben-Gvir stated that any "expressions of joy" related to the release of Palestinian prisoners was "equivalent to backing terrorism." On 29 November, police arrested activists at a Knesset protest opposing the government. Six were arrested on 2 December protesting outside Netanyahu's house in Caesarea.

The IDF ruled on 1 January 2024 that Palestinian activist Monder Amira could be held without trial for four months for his Facebook posts, which he stated weren't his.

On 8 January, following news that MK Ofer Cassif faced expulsion for supporting South Africa's ICJ lawsuit, MK Ahmad Tibi stated, "The finance minister said that there are two million Nazis in Gaza. This is how you legitimise genocide." In a petition to expel Cassif, MK Oded Forer stated, "He must soon find himself beyond the borders of the Knesset and preferably beyond the borders of Israel."

=== Conscientious objectors ===
A number of young Israelis conscientiously objected to IDF conscription in protest of the war. These "refuseniks" faced jail time for their refusal to serve. According to Amnesty International, Israel does not recognize a right to refuse military service on grounds of religion or conscience.

=== Politicians ===
In a social media post, MK Ahmad Tibi condemned statements by far-right politicians, stating, "Here today, Israel is being sued in The Hague, the lawsuit cites countless members of the Knesset. And guess how many Arab MKs 'supporting terrorism and embracing terrorists' are mentioned there – zero. Only Jewish ministers and judges on the right."

== Surveys ==
In February 2024, a poll by the Israel Democracy Institute found that 51 percent of Israelis believed the main goal of the war should be returning the hostages, while 36 percent believed it should be "toppling Hamas".

== Open letters ==
Some groups in Israel expressed support for the war. Dozens of rabbis signed a letter to Netanyahu and senior defence officials stating that "even when the enemy hides behind a human shield... there is no halakhic or moral preclusion, nor legal preclusion, from bombing the enemy after sufficient advance warning".

A group of 100 doctors called "Doctors for the Rights of Israeli Soldiers", signed a statement stating Israel had a "legitimate right" to bomb "terror nests and Hamas headquarters in the hospitals in Gaza". This prompted a harsh reply from the acting head of the ethics office at the Israel Medical Association, Dr. Tami Karni, who wrote that "doctors are sworn to heal, not kill... Israel's doctors have refused to be dragged into the consciental and moral decline of the enemy, and will continue to act accordingly". The White Robes, an organization which numbers in the hundreds, decried the letter as a "provocative pamphlet by an extremist minority", stating that "calls for indiscriminate destruction and killing, even if justified militarily, are not part of the medical ethical code". Physicians for Human Rights published an open letter signed by 350 physicians and medical personnel, which also condemns the aforementioned call.

In May 2024, 1,400 academics signed a petition calling for an end to the war.

== Israelis abroad ==
Jews and Israelis abroad participated in protests both supporting and protesting the Israeli response in the war.

== Reactions ==
In May 2024, Jake Sullivan, the US National Security Advisor, speaking about Israeli settlers who blocked aid from Jordan, spilling supplies to the ground, said, "It is a total outrage that there are people who are attacking and looting these convoys... this is completely and utterly unacceptable behaviour."
