= Rula Daood =

Palestinian Israeli activist

Rula Daood (Arabic: رولا داوود, Hebrew: רולא דאוד) is a Palestinian Israeli activist and co-director of Standing Together.

== Biography ==
Daood was born in 1985 in the Palestinian village of Kafr Yasif in northern Israel, and is a Palestinian citizen of Israel. She trained as a speech pathologist and lived in Lod for six years, and lived in Jaffa as of 2024. She says she made a decision to try to build bridges between Israeli Jews and Palestinians during the 2014 Gaza War when standing in line at a bakery in Ashdod. In response to a picture of Palestinian children who had been killed in Gaza in the newspaper Haaretz, a woman next to her in the bakery said she hoped all Palestinian children burned to death. Daood felt rage upon hearing this and asked the woman if they should stand on the roof and watch the children of Gaza burn. She then realized she wanted to overcome this kind of hatred and become a political activist.

She joined Standing Together in 2017, after a humiliating experience by Israeli guards at the Ben Gurion Airport upon returning from vacation in Italy in 2016. She worked as a community organizer within the organization for two years organizing events and protests before being appointed co-director. She leads mobilizations from Tel Aviv that call for mass marches against the Gaza War. In 2024, she and fellow Standing Together co-director Alon-Lee Green traveled across the United States with 12 speaking engagements in seven cities. When advocating for Standing Together's message, Daood says that the only viable path forward for Israelis and Palestinians is a peaceful resolution to the Israeli–Palestinian conflict. She said that their struggle is rooted in the belief that both peoples equally deserve rights and dignity on the same land. She said that the Israeli occupation needs to end and that there needs to be freedom and equality to both peoples. After she spoke to students at a school in Lydda about the Israeli-Palestinian conflict, the war in Gaza, and her experience living as a Palestinian in Israel, the organization Betzalmu filed a complaint with the Ministry of Education. In 2026, Daood and Green co-founded a new Israeli political party A Place for Us All and took a leave of absence from Standing Together to run in the 2026 Israeli election.

In 2022, Daood and Green received the Gallanter Prize from the New Israel Fund. In October 2024, they were selected for Time magazine's list TIME100 Next 2024, for Standing Together's activity against the legal reform, for promoting Jewish-Arab solidarity and for guaranteeing humanitarian aid to the Gaza Strip.
