= Alon-Lee Green =

Israeli activist & organizer (born 1987)

Alon-Lee Green אלון-לי גרין
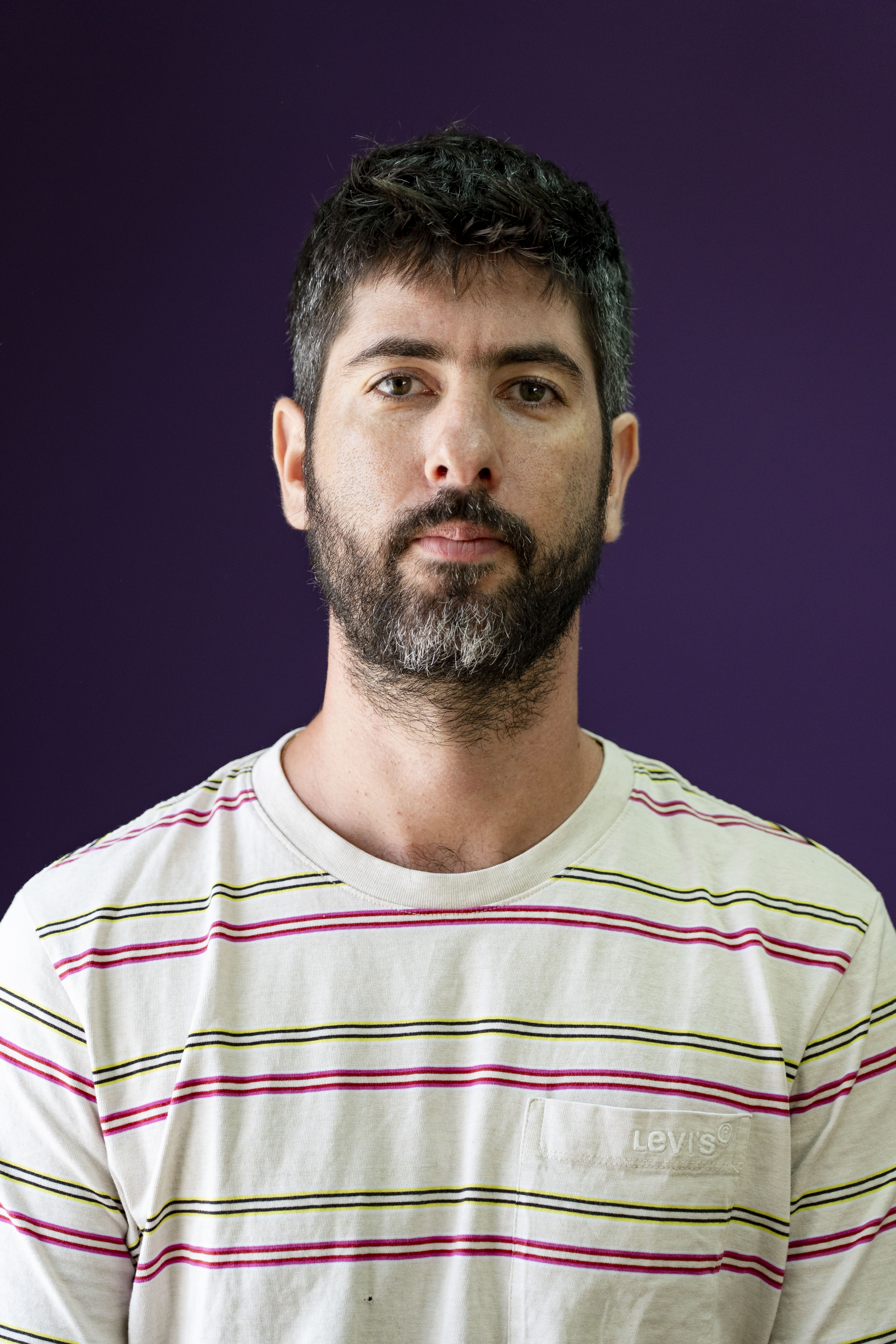
- Born: Alon-Lee Green; 1987 (age 38–39); Tel Aviv
- Known for: Co-director of Standing Together

Alon-Lee Green (Hebrew: אלון-לי גרין; born 1987) is a social activist and co-director and one of the founders of the Standing Together movement. Green initiated the establishment of the first workers' committee in the restaurant industry in Israel and was involved in the establishment of the workers' committee of the parliamentary advisers in the Knesset.

== Biography ==
Green grew up in Tel Aviv-Yafo. His father was a book seller and his mother a painter. His motivation to enter politics and activism started with the war against Hezbollah in 2006. In his last year of high school, Green worked at the coffee shop chain The Coffee Bean & Tea Leaf and initiated the establishment of the first workers' council in the restaurant and coffee shop industry in Israel, following violations of the labor laws in the chain. Due to this activity, Green was fired from his job, but the management of the network had to reinstate him following a petition submitted by Green and the Workers' Union to the National Labor Court. The ruling given in July 2007 dealt with the right of employees to organize at their workplace, and stated that it is forbidden to fire an employee who worked to establish a workers' union. After the management of the coffee shop chain continued to refuse to recognize the workers' committee and its representation, Green led the chain's workers in a six-week strike. The workers' struggle aroused public interest and even led to the application of pressure on the management of the global network by international labor unions. In 2008, a collective agreement was signed between Green and the chain's employees. Green worked at the network for another year after signing the agreement. The initial unionization he led and the ruling were one of the first signs of the path for the wave of unionization in the economy led by the Histadrut in the second decade of the 2000s.

From 2009 to 2014, Green was the parliamentary advisor and spokesman for Hadash party MK Dov Khenin. During this period, Green coordinated parliamentary work on the issues of democracy, workers' rights, the economy, and LGBT rights. At the same time, Green operated outside the Knesset, organized social and political demonstrations, and initiated the creation of coalitions of organizations to curb legislative initiatives that sought to weaken the Supreme Court of Israel and harm the rights of Arab citizens and human rights organizations. During his work in the Knesset, Green established the Committee of Parliamentary Assistants and fought to improve their employment conditions. Following this initiative, a collective agreement was signed between the Knesset management and the committee of parliamentary advisers, which guaranteed an improvement in their salary and employment conditions.

In 2011 Green was one of the leaders of the social protest and was described as the only member of the protest leadership who came from a background of previous political activity. During this period, Green organized and produced protests, led the "Week of Rage" initiative and was a co-founder of the social movement, alongside Stav Shaffir and Yonatan Levy. The movement continued to operate for about a year and a half after the summer of 2011. In 2012, Green was arrested at two demonstrations of the social protest. He noted that these types of arrests have the opposite of their intended effect, motivating more people to come out and join the protests. His activism has been driven by his concern watching Israel's gradual shift to the right and the threat to democracy in Israel.

== Standing Together movement ==
In 2015, Green was a co-founder of the Standing Together movement, a national Jewish-Arab movement that advocates for peace, equality and social justice. As part of his role in the movement, Green was one of the leaders of the protest against the Nationality Law, the fight to raise the minimum wage to 40 NIS per hour, the fight against the deportation of asylum seekers from Israel, the fight against Operation Wall Guard and other initiatives.

In August 2023, the Israeli army radio station canceled the broadcast of a program presented by Green, after pressure from right-wing activists. In November 2023, after the October 7 attacks, Green and fellow Standing Together leader Sally Abed went on a speaking tour on the East Coast of the U.S. to discuss their work. They visited D.C., New York City, and the Boston area where thousands of people came to hear them speak. Their message was that Israeli Jews and Palestinians urgently need to become partners and move beyond pro-Israel and pro-Palestine labels. They emphasized that Israelis and Palestinians deserve a new narrative and that "radical empathy" was essential. They were dismayed that Americans focused on litmus tests, statements and ultimatums, especially on college campuses.

In 2023 during the Israel-Gaza war, Green began to lead a public voice calling for a ceasefire and a hostage deal to end the war. Among other initiatives he led, Green took part in the movement's humanitarian guard, which went out to protect aid trucks to Gaza from right-wing activists who attacked the trucks.

Green serves as a leadership member of the movement and as its co-national director, alongside Rula Daood. In October 2024, the two were selected for Time magazine's 'TIME100 Next 2024' list, for the movement's activity against the legal reform, for promoting Jewish-Arab solidarity and for guaranteeing humanitarian aid to the Gaza Strip.

In 2026, Green and Daood co-founded a new Israeli political party A Place for Us All and took a leave of absence from Standing Together to run in the 2026 Israeli election.
