= Susan Shaw Devesa =

American cancer epidemiologist

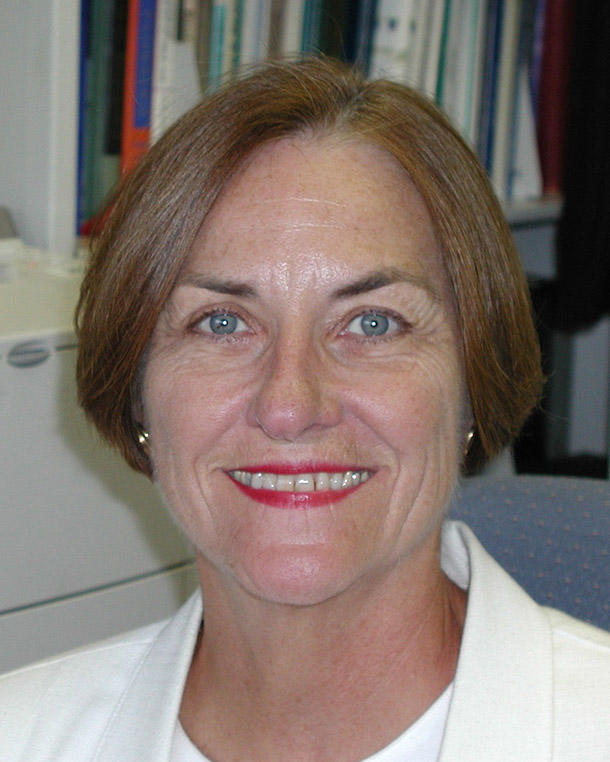
- Devesa in 2002
- Born: June 24, 1944 (age 82); Washington, D.C., U.S.
- Education: Earlham College; Johns Hopkins School of Hygiene and Public Health
- Scientific career
- Fields: Cancer epidemiology, descriptive research
- Workplaces: National Cancer Institute

Susan Shaw Devesa (born June 24, 1944) is an American cancer epidemiologist who conducts descriptive research of the patterns of cancer in the United States. She was a section chief of descriptive studies at the National Cancer Institute.

== Life ==
Devesa was born June 24, 1944, in Washington, D.C. She completed a B.A. in mathematics from Earlham College in 1966. She studied in France for a portion of her undergraduate degree. In 1966, Devesa joined the demography section in the biometry branch at the National Cancer Institute (NCI). She earned a M.H.S. (1974) and Ph.D. (1979) in epidemiology from the Johns Hopkins School of Hygiene and Public Health in 1974. Her dissertation was titled A study of the association of cancer incidence with income and education among whites and blacks. Earl L. Diamond was her doctoral advisor.

Devesa was appointed chief of the descriptive studies section in 1993. She is a fellow of the American College of Epidemiology. She received the United States Public Health Service (PHS) special recognition award for descriptive studies of the changing patterns of cancer in the United States, which have provided clues to etiologic risk factors, and the NCI division of cancer epidemiology and genetics (DCEG) exemplary service award in recognition of sustained research accomplishments and outstanding service to the Division and the NCI, resulting in the advancement of the goals of the National Cancer Program.

== See also ==
- List of Earlham College people
- List of Johns Hopkins University people
- List of women in statistics
