= Standing Together (movement) =

Israeli grassroots movement

- עומדים ביחד (Omdim Beyachad) نقف معًا (Naqif Maʿan)
- Formation: 2015; 11 years ago
- Purpose: Arab–Jewish equality; Social justice; Anti-racism
- Headquarters: Tel Aviv-Yafo
- Members: c. 7000 (Dec 2025)
- Official language: Hebrew; Arabic
- Co-Directors: Alon-Lee Green; Rula Daood
- Website: standing-together.org/en (English) standing-together.org (Hebrew/Arabic)

Standing Together (Hebrew: עומדים ביחד, romanized: Omdim Beyachad; Arabic: نقف معًا, romanized: Naqif Ma'an) is an Israeli grassroots movement that aims to bring together Arab Israeli and Jewish Israeli communities in the struggle for Israeli-Palestinian peace, equality and social justice. Known for its purple branding, it is the largest Arab-Jewish grassroots movement in the country. Standing Together first became active in 2015, and had about 7,000 members as of December 2025.

The movement opposes neoliberalism and the Israeli occupation of the Palestinian territories. It aims to further LGBT rights, women's rights, workers' rights (including disability benefits) and full equality for Palestinian citizens of Israel. Since the Gaza war began in October 2023, the movement has played a role in the anti-war and pro-ceasefire protests within Israeli society.

== Organization ==
Standing Together founders have cited Podemos, Momentum, Syriza, and the Democratic Socialists of America as inspirations but have stated they do not want the movement to become a political party. The movement's focus on both economic and social justice has been called a strength.

The movement has nine chapters, called "circles", across Israel: in the Sharon, the Triangle, and in the Negev, in the major cities of Haifa, Tel Aviv, and Jerusalem, and in the college campuses of Tel Aviv University, Ben-Gurion University, the University of Haifa, and in the Hebrew University of Jerusalem.

The movement aims to ensure equal treatment for Arab and Jewish-Israelis. The leadership has roughly equal representation of each group, and the movement publishes all material in Hebrew and Arabic. However, as of 2018, the movement had more Jewish-Israeli members than Arab-Israelis.

Alon-Lee Green and Rula Daood are the National Co-Directors of the movement, Uri Weltmann is the movement's national field organizer, and Sally Abed is the head of the resource development department. They are all elected leaders with the movement's leadership.

== Funding ==
Standing Together is registered in Israel as a non-profit organization rather than as a political party, and funds its activities through a combination of small domestic donations, membership contributions, and grants from overseas donors and foundations. As a civil society organization, it is subject to Israel’s non-profit disclosure requirements but is not regulated under the campaign finance and donation limits that apply to registered political parties during election periods.

Financial disclosures published by Israeli authorities indicate that Standing Together has received significant funding from foreign entities over multiple years. According to filings submitted to the Registrar of Non‑Profits, the organization received grants from the German-based forumZFD (now ProPeace) totaling several hundred thousand shekels in both 2022 and 2024. The same disclosures show that in 2020 and 2021 the movement received additional overseas funding in the range of tens of thousands of shekels from the Rosa Luxemburg Stiftung, a Germany‑based political foundation.

Standing Together has also been a recipient of funding from US‑based philanthropic organizations. Analysis of New Israel Fund grant data indicates that between 2015 and 2020 the movement received approximately US$750,000 in cumulative funding from the New Israel Fund, which supports Israeli civil society organizations engaged in political and social advocacy.

Additional overseas support has been documented from European and North American foundations. Public grant disclosures list Standing Together as a grantee of the Sigrid Rausing Trust, a UK‑based human‑rights foundation, as well as the Blaustein Philanthropic Group, which reported a grant for general support in 2024.

Alongside these institutional grants, the movement reports ongoing fundraising from individual donors in Israel and abroad, including monthly small‑donor contributions that constitute a portion of its operating budget.

== Campaigns ==
=== Minimum 40 ===
In 2021, Standing Together's "Minimum 40" campaign, supported by over 40 Knesset members from various parties, successfully advanced a bill to raise Israel’s minimum wage to 40 shekels per hour, which passed its preliminary reading in June 2022.

=== Kulanu Kan ===
In early 2023, Israeli Communications Minister Shlomo Karhi proposed dissolving the Israeli Public Broadcasting Corporation (Kan), prompting public backlash. In response, Standing Together launched a campaign against the proposed dissolution. On 2 February 2023, Karhi froze the proposal, which the movement regarded as a victory. In English, kulanu kan means "all of us (are) here".

=== The Humanitarian Guard ===
HaMishmar HaHumanitari, also known as The Humanitarian Guard, is a campaign against Tsav 9, an Israeli right-wing organization that blocks humanitarian aid to Gaza.

On 14 June 2024, the United States State Department officially added Tsav 9 to its list of sanctioned entities for impeding the delivery of humanitarian aid to the Gaza Strip, categorizing it as a "violent extremist" group.

== History ==
Standing Together was founded in late 2015, primarily by individuals who had also been active in Israel's 2011 social justice protests. Many of the founders were members of the political coalition Hadash and the Communist Party of Israel. They have protested political arrests, evictions in East Jerusalem (including Sheikh Jarrah), the Gaza border protests, during which the IDF killed 223 people, and the planned demolition of Bedouin villages in the Negev.

By 2018, the movement had about 2,000 registered members, and between 20,000 and 30,000 people participated in Standing Together events that year. Before the October 7 attacks, membership had dropped to a few hundred members, but by the end of 2024 it had more than 6,000 members, almost 4,000 of whom were making monthly donations.

In the summer of 2017, Standing Together protesters blocked several major highways to protest disability benefits being less than minimum wage. They also subsequently helped raise money for protesters who had been fined. On 11 December 2017, it held its first National Assembly, during which they voted on the movement's leaderships and on suggested proposals.

In 2018, Standing Together worked to spread awareness of, and protest against, Israel’s deportation of African (specifically Eritrean and Sudanese) asylum seekers. The movement was able to organize a 20,000 person strong protest in South Tel Aviv against the planned deportations. In May 2018, they protested the IDF response to Palestinian protests at the Gazan border, which had resulted in the deaths of more than 60 protesters. That month, they also organized protests against the move of the U.S. embassy to Jerusalem.

In 2019, a small group of activists from Standing Together protested a policy of Barzilai Medical Center that required Arab bus passengers to be questioned before they could enter the hospital. Although the policy exempted Arab-Israeli citizens, anecdotal reports had reported Arab-Israeli citizens had also been singled out over the policy.

In September 2020, the group organized a protest against the Israeli government's response to the COVID-19 pandemic - which the group deemed ineffective - in Tel Aviv. The group filled Rabin Square with 1,019 empty chairs, each representing an Israeli death from COVID-19.

In January 2023 Standing Together organized a 20,000-30,000 person strong protest in Tel Aviv against the new government; later that year, they participated in the 2023 Israeli judicial reform protests against the 2023 Israeli judicial reform enacted by prime minister Benjamin Netanyahu. In August 2023, a radio show hosted by the movement's national co-director, Alon-Lee Green, was censured after a right-wing pressure campaign. A week later, the show was leaked and published online. In late September 2023, the movement held a protest at Dizengoff Square in Tel Aviv to bring attention to the Arabs killed under the policies of security minister Itamar Ben-Gvir.

=== Work during the Gaza war (2023–present) ===
Following the onset of the Gaza war in October 2023, Standing Together collected aid for communities affected by the October 7 attacks. They organized the Solidarity Convention, which spearheaded anti-war and pro-ceasefire rallies in Israel. They also created a hotline for Arab-Israelis, particularly university students, who were affected by anti-Palestinian sentiments. Standing Together leadership also traveled to the United States to speak to synagogues and other organizations about their work.

In March 2024, some activists from the group organized a 30-car convoy in an attempt to deliver humanitarian aid to the Kerem Shalom border crossing into the Gaza Strip. Police forced the convoy to turn around about three kilometers from the crossing.

In May 2024, the group announced they would be forming a group to protect humanitarian aid trucks bound for the Gaza Strip from attacks by "far-right [Israeli] activists and settlers" while they were moving from Jordan through the West Bank. According to Standing Together leadership, the presence of the Standing Together activists allowed all the aid trucks "to pass without the settlers stopping or attacking them".

Since 2024, the movement's Humanitarian Guard has been activated around the annual Jerusalem Day Flag March in the Old City of Jerusalem, protecting the Palestinian residents of the Muslim Quarter who frequently face attacks by Israeli settlers.

In April 2025, the Standing Together chapter at the University of Haifa held a demonstration holding photos of Palestinian children killed in the war. This was met by harassment from right-wing students, some of whom defaced the children's photos with stickers that said "Kahane was right." The university later suspended all on-campus events for the group for the rest of the semester.

In November 2025, during their annual convention, the movement adopted for the first time a vision for resolving the Israeli-Palestinian conflict, based on a variation of the two-state solution put forward by A Land for All.

=== Formation of a political party ===
2026 elections campaign poster by A Place for Us All. (transl. A government of peace will bring change / Yes to a Palestinian state alongside Israel)

In order to run in the 2026 Israeli legislative election, the leadership of Standing Together decided to form a party, Makom LeKulanu (Hebrew: מקום לכולנו, lit. 'A place for us all'). There had long been rumors that Standing Together had been trying to become a political party since their founding and especially since the Gaza war protests in Israel. Their self-stated goal was to promote a "truly equal" Jewish-Arab political party, with an equal number of Palestinian Israelis being represented on the list as Jewish Israelis. Upon the founding of the party, Rula Daood proclaimed that "We are being abandoned, murdered, our future is being burned," arguing that efforts to replace the government must be accompanied by a positive vision. Referring to the prime, national security and finance ministers, she added, "Not only will we be part of the struggle to replace Netanyahu, Ben Gvir and Smotrich, but we will also lead the struggle for Israeli-Palestinian peace, national and civil equality, and social justice." At a press conference in Nazareth, party members stated that their main issues were peace, social justice, soaring violence and crime in Arab communities, the cost of living, and climate justice. Party members have argued about their importance in this election, with Daood proclaiming "this is the last moment to save our society."

The party has also sought to boost its feminist credentials, emphasizing the role of its specifically Palestinian women leaders, with Standing Together organizer Uri Weltmann stating that "There is no political party in today's Israeli politics that is led by a woman,...We know that only 40 percent of Arab women intend to vote for the Knesset,...That's due to various causes, but I think that the lack of representation is one of them."

Makom LeKulanu has many platforms which focus on issues specific to the Israeli Arab community, such as combating crime in Arab localities. Alongside this, the party wants to withdraw the IDF from the Gaza Strip and Lebanon, and integrate Israel into the Middle East based on the guidelines set by the Arab Peace Initiative. The party has also run to the left on economics, calling for free universal education from birth and raising the Israeli minimum wage from NIS 35 per hour to NIS 50 per hour.

Many have critiqued the new party as a potential spoiler which could allow Netanyahu to win the election, as it could siphon votes from Arab center-left parties such as Ta'al. The party, on its part, said it would be willing to form a coalition with the opposition "even if," according to Weltman, "that means accepting a center-right coalition led by Naftali Bennett, Yair Lapid and Gadi Eisenkot." Some have also argued that Makom LeKulanu might run with Hadash. At its founding, the party sought to run independently.

The party ulitmately chose not to contest the election, after unsuccessful negotiations with Ta'al and similarly unsuccessful talks with the reconciliation committee which reformed the Joint List.

== Local government activity ==
Although Standing Together is not registered as a political party and does not formally contest elections, activists and senior figures associated with the movement have played an increasingly visible role in municipal politics through affiliated local lists. These lists are not formally part of Standing Together as an organization, but they have publicly identified with the movement’s agenda and branding, including the use of its distinctive purple color scheme, and have been led by individuals who simultaneously hold senior roles within the movement.

During the 2024 Israeli municipal elections, activists associated with Standing Together launched and supported independent municipal lists in several major cities, including Tel Aviv–Yafo (Ir Segula), Haifa (Rov Ha’Ir), and Jerusalem (Kol Ohavia). These initiatives focused on issues closely aligned with Standing Together’s platform, such as social equality, environmental sustainability, shared Arab‑Jewish civic space, and affordable housing, and were organized and maintained by grassroots activists rather than national party frameworks.

=== Tel Aviv–Yafo ===
In the Tel Aviv–Yafo City Council, Standing Together activists have been active through the municipal list Ir Segula (Hebrew: עיר סגולה). In the 2024 municipal elections, Ir Segula ran as part of a joint technical slate known as Kulanu Ha’ir, together with other local movements and representatives affiliated with Hadash. Despite this joint electoral framework, Ir Segula has continued to operate publicly under its own name and identity within the city council.

One of Standing Together’s leaders, Itamar Avneri, was elected to the Tel Aviv city council under this arrangement. Avneri has been publicly identified both as a member of Standing Together’s national leadership and as a representative of the Ir Segula faction in municipal politics.

=== Haifa ===
In Haifa, Standing Together‑affiliated activists have participated in local government through the municipal list Rov Ha’Ir (Hebrew: רוב העיר). The list contested municipal elections independently and emphasized themes closely aligned with Standing Together’s agenda, including social justice, opposition to discrimination in municipal services, and the promotion of shared Arab‑Jewish civic engagement.

Sally Abed, a national leader of Standing Together, serves as a member of the Haifa City Council and is publicly identified with both roles. Abed appears in official municipal listings as a city councillor while also being described in media coverage as part of the movement’s national leadership.

Taken together, the participation of Standing Together’s activists and leadership in municipal electoral lists has drawn public and media attention to the relationship between the movement’s status as a non‑profit civil society organization and its sustained involvement in local electoral politics. Political commentators and observers have noted that these developments have prompted discussion about the practical boundaries between NGO‑based activism and party‑political participation at the municipal level, particularly given the distinct legal and regulatory frameworks governing non‑profits and registered political parties in Israel.

== Criticism ==
The movement has faced criticism from parts of the Israeli radical left regarding its approach to Arab-Jewish partnership. In a series of 2019 articles in the left-wing magazine Local Call (Sikha Mekomit), critics argued that Standing Together's strategy of appealing to the Israeli mainstream and emphasizing shared socio-economic interests marginalizes the Palestinian struggle for national liberation. In the series, activists Rami Younis and Orly Noy criticized the movement for downplaying Palestinian national symbols, such as the Palestinian flag, in order to accommodate Jewish Israelis. They contended that true partnership requires confronting Jewish supremacy and supporting Palestinian national rights, rather than focusing solely on individual civil rights. Another contributor to the series, Rami Gudovitch, argued that by prioritizing a broad consensus and shared class interests over direct opposition to the Israeli occupation, the movement risks normalizing the occupation and alienating Palestinian nationalists.

According to Samah Watad, to maintain its broad "big-tent" coalition, Standing Together maintains a policy of "strategic ambiguity" regarding Zionism and Israel's Jewish character; while pragmatic for retaining Jewish-Israeli members, she argues, the lack of a clear stance on settler-colonialism has alienated some Palestinian activists, who view the framework as inherently unequal. She continues that this ideological ambiguity is partly what led the Palestinian Campaign for the Academic and Cultural Boycott of Israel (PACBI) to denounce the movement in January 2024 as a "normalization outfit that seeks to distract from and whitewash Israel's ongoing genocide in Gaza." This boycott call received counter-criticism from academics and activists, including Gazan blogger Ahmed Fouad Alkhatib, while Palestinian members of Standing Together denounced PACBI's statement, saying such calls "serve the interests of Israel’s political establishment, which is also attempting to silence us."

As the movement has grown, it has also generated friction with traditional Arab political parties, such as Hadash and Balad, who increasingly view Standing Together with skepticism. Members of these parties have criticized the movement's "visibility" tactics—such as wearing branded movement shirts to protests and mourning tents—as inappropriate competition. Tensions escalated in 2025 when Standing Together's national co-director, Rula Daood, attempted to run for the leadership of the High Follow-Up Committee for Arab Citizens of Israel. Seen as a challenge to the traditional political establishment, she was ultimately disqualified from the race following internal pressure.
