= Devesas Factory Warehouse =

Building in Porto, Porto District, Portugal

- Depósito de Materiais da Fábrica das Devesas
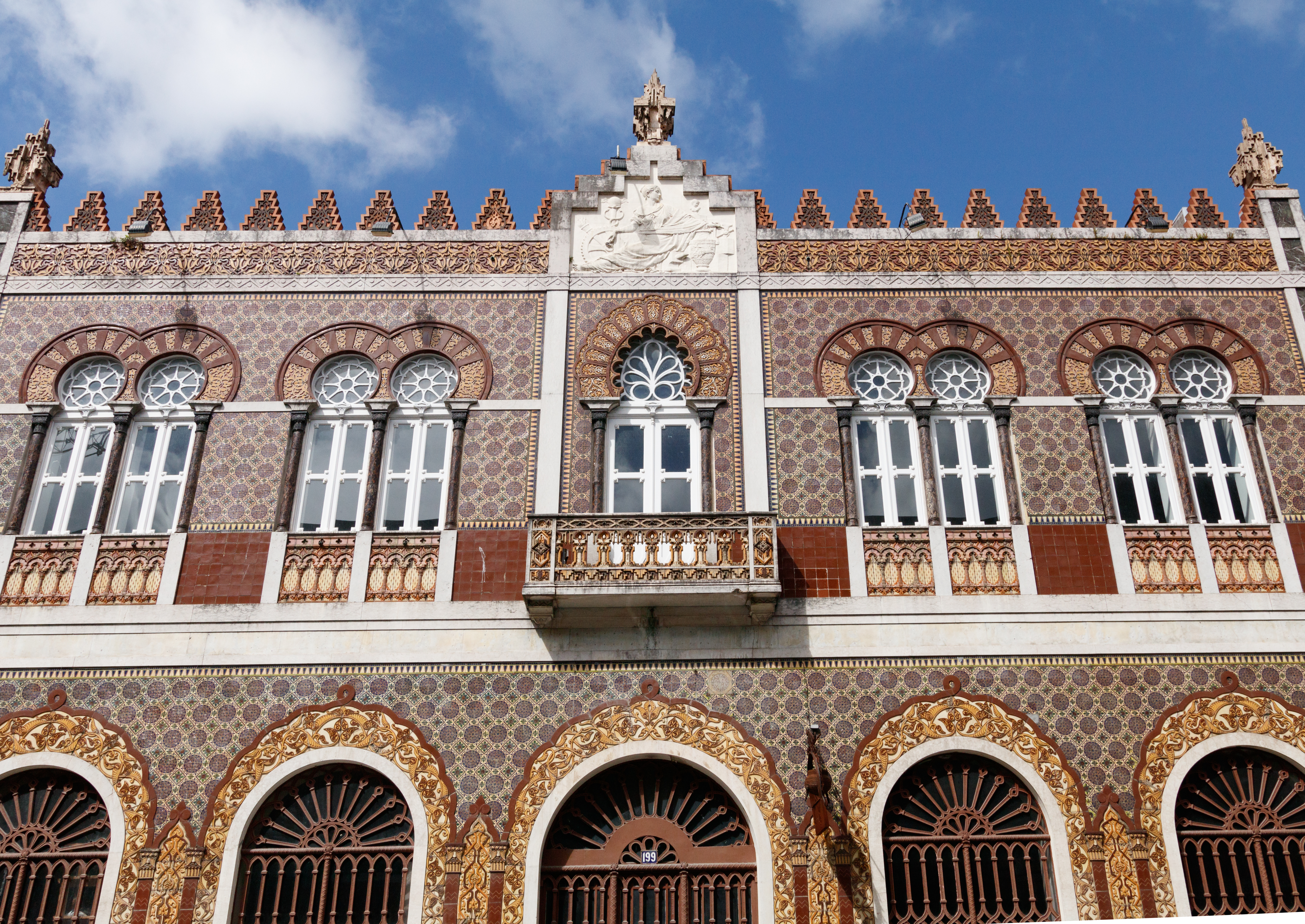
- The Neo-Arabesque facade of the Devesas Factory Warehouse along Rua José Falcão]

General information
- Type: Warehouse
- Location: Cedofeita, Santo Ildefonso, Sé, Miragaia, São Nicolau e Vitória, Porto, Portugal
- Coordinates: 41°8′58.6″N 8°36′51.3″W
- Owner: Portuguese Republic

Technical details
- Material: Granite

The Devesas Factory Warehouse (Portuguese: Depósito de Materiais da Fábrica das Devesas) is a former-warehouse used for materials in the civil parish of Cedofeita, Santo Ildefonso, Sé, Miragaia, São Nicolau e Vitória, in the municipality of Porto, in the Portuguese district of the same name.

== History ==
The Fábrica de Cerâmica das Devesas (Devesas Ceramic Factory) was established in Vila Nova de Gaia in 1865 and was, at the time, one of the largest and best equipped producers of ceramics. Founded by António Almeida e Costa, it was also a foundation responsible the production of ironworks that contributed to the ceramics industry. His partner, was master José Joaquim Teixeira Lopes, a reputable ceramics sculptor in the region, trained at the Escola de Belas Artes do Porto (Porto School of Fine Arts) and the Escola Imperial de Paris (Paris Imperial School). The Devesas building, much like the Carvalhinho and Massarelos buildings, are connected with the production of relief azulejo. On 17 August 1899, António de Almeida Costa & Co. obtained a license to construct the warehouse along Rua José Falcão, which was conceded on 31 August.

The building was constructed in 1901. Owing to its importance and Porto commercial centre, the building was original constructed along Rua D. Carlos I (today the Rua José Falcão) in a house, becoming a warehouse for the storage, showcase and sale of these tiles. Due to the richest and rigor of the ceramic elements, it is suggested that the facade was the author of master José Joaquim Teixeira Lopes. It was acquired by the firm UNITECA in the 1960s.

On 30 March 1999, a process was open to classify the building as heritage site by the DRPorto. It was supported on 14 April by the Vice-President of the IPPAR, that included the classification of the installations in Vila Nova da Gaia. The classification was supplemented on 22 December 2010, by a proposal from the DRCNorte, to classify the structure as a Monumento de Interesse Público, but which suggested separating the Devesas structures on either side of the river. But, on 9 February 2011, the SPPA of the Conselho Nacional de Cultura (National Council of Culture) proposed that the certification should not be a national classification. On 9 March, a dispatch by the IGESPAR director archived the process, resulting in the appearance of official complaints on 7 December. A new proposal was initiated on 19 March 2012, by the DRCNorte, to classify the building as a MIP. It was supported on 22 May by the reopening by the Director-General of DGPC, and a 25 July dispatch published as Announcement 13300/2012 (Diário da República, Série 2, 143). On 29 May 2013, the period of study was closed and, on 22 April 2014, the decision on the project was formalized with Announcement 97/2014 (Diário da República, Série 2, 78).

== Architecture ==
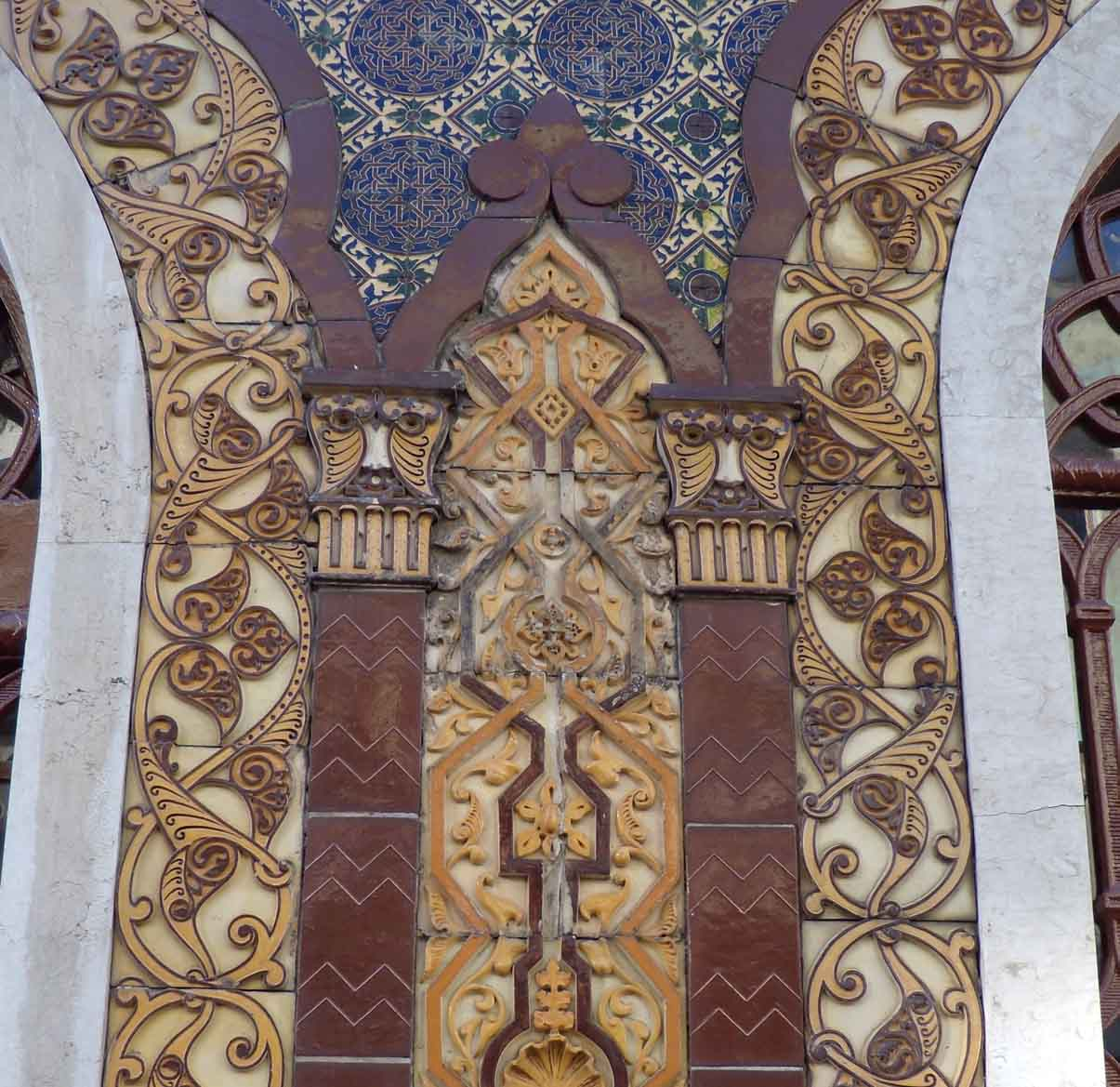
Detail of the azueljo along the front facade

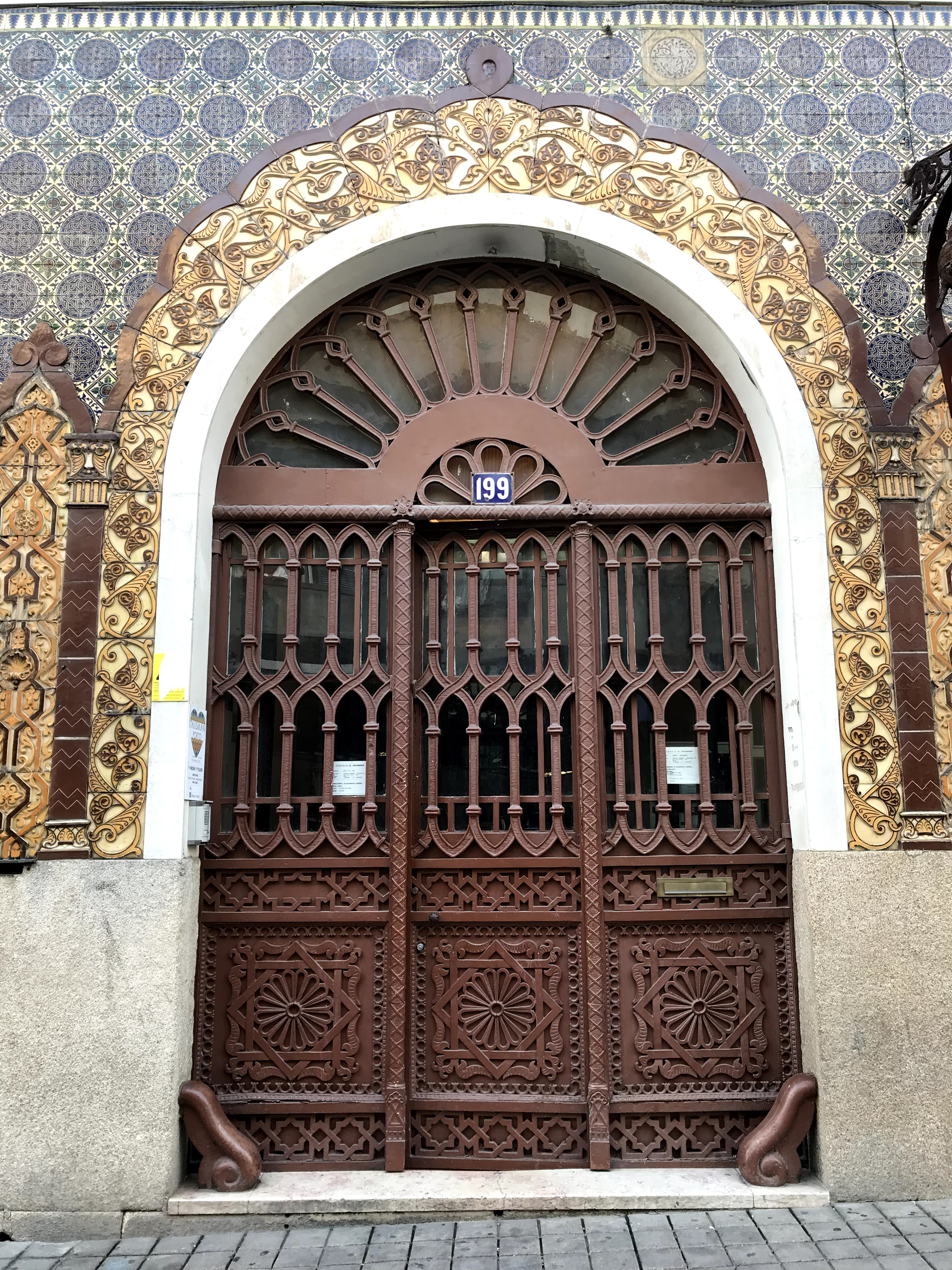
Entrance to the building

The warehouse/building is situated along the corner of two roadways, with its facade extending along Rua José Falcão (flanked by two-story buildings) and Rua da Conceição (with a two-story building on the west and three-story building in the east).

The L-shaped building includes two bodies, two-storeys with articulated patio: one fronting the Rua José Falcão and the other to Rua da Conceição. The facade fronting the Rua José Falcão has four windows on the ground floor decorated with rounded arch similar to Arabesque motifs, while the upper floor has double windows with similar motifs. The segment over the front portico, also with Arabesque motif, is surmounted by a window (with similar motifs) and varanda topped by arch and ogival. Along the building is a cornice surmounted by ceramic merlons, with corner and central vases. The facade is totally covered in azulejo title, with large, smooth ceramic plaques adapted to the forms. The facade oriented to the Rua da Conceição is structurally similar to the other wall. On the first floor, to the right, are doors with flag, while on the left a wide portal with a central door and flag. On the upper floors are four arched windows flanked with borders. The entire facade is covered in smooth azulejos with figures in white, blue and yellow, with imitation balustrades over the windows. It is decorated by cornices and surmounted by rectangular merlons. The yard currently covered and subdivided by moveable partitions is surrounded on its perimeter by a balcony, constituting an exhibition gallery. The building toward Rua da Conceição has a traditional residence corridor to the center, hall and staircase lined with tile. On the ground floor is an extensive space supported by cast iron columns, occupied by parking. The rear of the building, formerly street, are occupied by office space. The building facing the Rua José Falcão to the east, is marked on the ground floor by a central hall with a room on each side.The upper floor is characterized by a hall along the main facade, supported by four steel columns, with the side walls covered in glazed bookcases. This space is currently divided by offices. This is the old Devesas Exhibition Hall, decorated with stucco on the ceiling and bottom of the windows. Metal ceiling beams form a grid structuring of similar stucco composition. The bottom of the windows feature tile panels with figurative references to the factory. Inside the building are elements of the production plant, the interior frames of accessways, floors coverings, wainscoting, balcony guards and stairs with ceramic elements. The metallic columns have corners with the metallic "DEVESAS".
