= Humanitarian aid to Gaza =

Humanitarian aid response in December 2023.

The population of the Gaza Strip has faced starvation and famine since the blockade started in 2007. As a result of this, official bodies have urged Israel to improve the facilitation of humanitarian aid supplies to Gaza. The blockade was intensified during the Gaza war which has further restricted Humanitarian aid during the war as Gaza experiences a humanitarian crisis. According to the Coordinator of Government Activities in the Territories (COGAT), an Israeli military unit responsible for humanitarian aid, aid "is routed to Egypt and then forwarded to undergo Israeli security screening at either Nitzana or Kerem Shalom Crossings". There is also an aid delivery channel via Jordan.

Israel was criticized for limiting humanitarian aid to Gaza for the past few years. COGAT has claimed in 2024 that "there is no limit on the amount of aid" that can enter Gaza, but the United Nations has accused Israel of blocking land routes and airstriking.

== Routes ==
Aid could enter through Nitzana Border Crossing, Kerem Shalom Border Crossing, and Erez Border Crossing. Aid could be also entered by sea (Gaza floating pier) and by air (using airdrops).

Before Israel-Hamas war, 400-500 trucks entered Gaza every single day from these crossing.

== Opposition ==
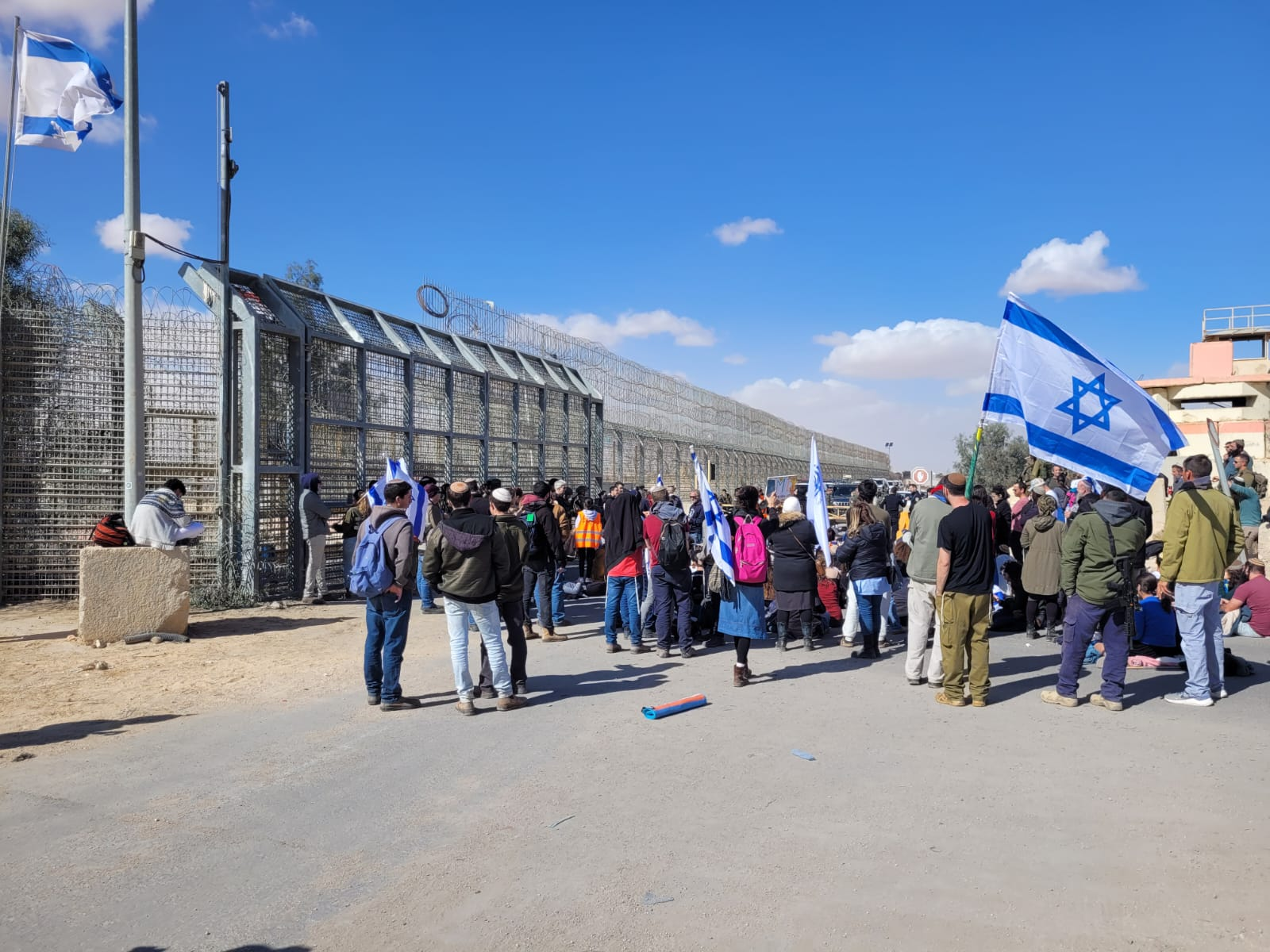
Israelis blocking humanitarian aid from entering Gaza, February 2024

Some Israelis are against humanitarian aid entering Gaza. According to a poll published by Globes, 22% of Israelis think that "Israel should not provide humanitarian aid (to Gaza) at all during wartime", 27% of Israelis think that Israel should provide as much as needed, and 44% of Israelis think that Israeli aid should be linked to the return of hostages.

Since January 2024, the protest movement "Tzav 9", have announced protests blocking Kerem Shalom border crossing. (On 14 June 2024, Tzav 9 were sanctioned by the US.) On 28 January 2024, Yaron Finkelman, an Israeli major general who commands the Southern Command of the Israel Defense Forces, announced a military exclusion zone (MEZ) on Kerem Shalom border crossing. this was in order to block further protests at the area. as a result, Tzav 9 have announced further protests

On 29 January 2024, 13 protestors who blocked routes to humanitarian aid were arrested. On 13 May 2024, protestors rioted at "Tarkamiya" crossing, set fire to two humanitarian trucks and vandalized a further nine. Four were arrested in this incident.

Israeli Defense Minister Israel Katz supported the blockade of humanitarian aid to Gaza, saying on 16 April 2025: "Israel's policy is clear: no humanitarian aid will enter Gaza, and blocking this aid is one of the main pressure levers preventing Hamas from using it as a tool with the population."

== United Nations World Food Program ==
On July 12, 2026, Dr. Ramiz Alakbarov, the United Nations Deputy Special Coordinator for the Middle East Peace Process, and Resident and Humanitarian Coordinator for the Occupied Palestinian Territory, condemned the ongoing actions to the block humanitarian aid by the "de facto authorities". He claimed that in this particular incident activists forced their way into Abu Rashid food distribution point in Jabalia, North Gaza and into a UN WFP (World Food Program) warehouse, which normally provides hundreds of thousands of hot meals every day. They reportedly assaulted drivers delivering supplies but that this is part of a pattern of incidents which includes impediments to delivery of supplies, menacing staff and reducing space for humanitarian activities. He called for an immediate end to this obstruction. Hamas denied these claims.

== Assistance ==
=== Gaza floating pier ===
The Gaza floating pier is a floating dock facility created by the U.S. military, after being proposed immediately before U.S. President Biden's 2024 State of the Union Address on 7 March 2024. It was completed in May 2024.

It was constructed by U.S. military forces based on ships offshore of the Gaza Strip, then connected to the shore by causeway, to enable the delivery of maritime cargo for humanitarian assistance to Gaza. The unloading point joins the Netzarim Corridor. The World Food Programme will be responsible for receiving and distributing the aid.

On 25 May 2024, the U.S. military announced that four boats that served as part of the pier's support system broke off from the structure, following choppy waters, so it stopped operating.

The repaired pier was reinstalled by 7 June 2024 and has reportedly been getting aid since 8 June 2024.
