= Jana E. Compton =

American research ecologist

- Born: Oak Ridge, Tennessee
- Education: Earlham College, University of Washington (M.A. and Ph.D)
- Awards: 2018 Ecological Society of America fellow
- Scientific career
- Fields: Research ecology
- Workplaces: Western Ecology Division of EPA’s Office of Research and Development

Jana Compton is a research ecologist for the United States Environmental Protection Agency's (EPA) office of research and development. Her work focuses on identifying sources of nitrogen pollution and connecting those issues to how they effect our ecosystem services.

== Early life and education ==
Jana Compton grew up in Oak Ridge, Tennessee. Growing up she had lots of first hand experience with pollution. She could see coal power plants from her backyard and Oak Ridge was one of the places that the Manhattan project took place in the 1940s so radiation pollution was everywhere. Compton is quoted saying that she often thought about all the invisible chemicals around her while catching crawdads and salamanders in her backyard creek. Compton received her undergraduate degree from Earlham College. She cites her professor William Stratton, who first taught her about acid rain, as the inspiration pushing her towards environmental science. She obtained both her master's degree and Ph.D. at the University of Washington in forest and forest ecology. After that she did post-doctoral work at Harvard University studying the effects of different types of agricultural land use on the levels of nitrogen, carbon, and phosphorus in those areas of land.

== Career and research ==
As an ecologist with the Western Ecology Division of the Environmental Protection Agency's (EPA) Office of Research and Development, Jana Compton investigates the sources and effects of nitrogen pollution. Compton's research focuses on non-point sources of nitrogen pollution, for example, land use and agriculture. Her non-research based work for the EPA mostly consists of connecting these sources to their impacts, and quantify them in ways that people can understand. Compton believes that this is so important because nutrient pollution is something you have to visualize and can't always see. Her work helps to address major problems like air quality, and problems with waterways such as eutrophication and coastal hypoxia. As well as this Compton looks into the social and economic impacts of nitrogen pollution, which she believes "can help people to recognize how it might be affecting the benefits we all get from healthy ecosystems, what we call “ecosystem services,” such as clean air and safe drinking water". In one of her most cited works Compton did research on agricultural land use and its relationship to nitrogen pollution. She and her team studied twelve different forest cites in central New England some of which had been abandoned from agriculture use up to 120 years ago and some which were still being used for agricultural purposes. Her work showed a heavy correlation between the amount of nitrification in the soil and how long ago agriculture use on the land ended.

== Awards and honors ==
Jana Compton was elected as a 2018 Ecological Society of America fellow. These fellows are members who have made outstanding contributions to a wide range of fields served by ESA, including, but not restricted to, those that advance or apply ecological knowledge in academics, government, non-profit organizations, and the broader society. Compton was chosen to be elected for "her innovative and tireless efforts to better understand and develop societal solutions to the problem of nitrogen pollution. Her assessments of the social and environmental costs of excess nitrogen, her outstanding mentorship of students, and her applications of ecology to management and policy make her an inspiration".

== Publications ==
Publications by and with Compton include:

1. Compton, Jana E.; Boone, Richard D. (2000). "Long-Term Impacts of Agriculture on Soil Carbon and Nitrogen in New England Forests". Ecology. 81 (8): 2314–2330. doi:10.1890/0012-9658(2000)081[2314:LTIOAO]2.0.CO;2.
2. Hooker, Toby D.; Compton, Jana E. (2003). "Forest Ecosystem Carbon and Nitrogen Accumulation During the First Century After Agricultural Abandonment". Ecological Applications. 13 (2): 299–313. doi:10.1890/1051-0761(2003)013[0299:FECANA]2.0.CO;2.
3. Compton, Jana E.; Church, M. Robbins; Larned, Scott T.; Hogsett, William E. (2003). "Nitrogen Export from Forested Watersheds in the Oregon Coast Range: The Role of N 2 -fixing Red Alder". Ecosystems. 6 (8): 773–785. doi:10.1007/s10021-002-0207-4.
