= Summia Tora =

- Born: Kabul, Afghanistan
- Education: Earlham College (BA); Somerville College, Oxford (MSc, MPP)

Summia Tora is an Afghan campaigner for women's and refugee rights and a social entrepreneur. In November 2023, she was included on the BBC's 100 Women list.

== Early life and education ==
Tora's family, who is of Uzbek descent, fled Afghanistan in 1997 due to the rise of the Taliban. They resettled in Peshwar, Pakistan, where Tora attended school. Tora left Peshawar in 2014, to attend high school in New Mexico in the United States through United World Colleges. She took the school's entrance exam in March 2014 at the Serena Hotel in Kabul; the following day, it was attacked by Taliban militants. She graduated from high school in 2016 and went on to attend Earlham College, where she graduated in 2020 with a bachelor's degree in both Economics and Peace and Global Studies.

Tora became the first Afghan Rhodes Scholar in 2020. She earned a Masters in Public Policy from the University of Oxford's Blavatnik School of Government in 2021 and completed a Master of Science in international human rights law from University of Oxford in 2023, where she was a member of Somerville College.

== Activism and entrepreneurship ==
Tora has worked with refugees and asylum seekers globally since a young age. She has advocated for Afghan refugees' rights in Pakistan, Greece, United Kingdom and the United States.

In 2019, Tora co-founded the Dosti Initiative to educate girls about menstrual health and hygiene in Afghanistan. In 2021, Tora founded the Dosti Network to provide humanitarian aid to Afghans under Taliban rule and to help them relocate outside the country if they wished. Dosti has offered educational scholarships and support to empower young Afghans to access education during the Taliban's ban on girls and women's education. Tora has also used her contacts through Dosti to help some Afghans escape the country, and to support Afghan refugees living in Pakistan.

In September 2021, Tora wrote a piece for The Economist about the evacuation from Afghanistan.

== Recognition ==
In 2022, Tora was one of 18 recipients of the Echoing Green Fellowship. The first Afghan to receive the fellowship, Tora said she would use the funds to expand the Dosti Network.

In May 2023, Tora was named as one of Forbes' 30 Under 30 Asia for Social Impact. In June 2023, Tora received the CEU Open Society Prize, as one of six representatives of Afghan women's struggle for the protection of women's and girls’ rights in Afghanistan.

In November 2023, Tora was named to the BBC's 100 Women list.

== Personal life ==
Tora's family were living in Afghanistan by 2021. Shortly before the Fall of Kabul, Tora's mother and siblings fled to Pakistan, but her father and uncle remained in the country with no way to leave. With Tora's Oxford connections, she was able to get her father and uncle on an evacuation flight out of Kabul, which left on August 24, 2021. Her family was later resettled in the United States in April 2023.
