= The Future Vision of the Palestinian Arabs in Israel =

The Future Vision of the Palestinian Arabs in Israel is a joint document put together by prominent Arab citizens of Israel in December 2006, that calls for the state of Israel to shed its Jewish identity and become "a state of all its citizens". The document caused a great deal of controversy, even among more liberal Jewish Israelis.
