= Tsav 9 =

Right-wing organization based in Israel

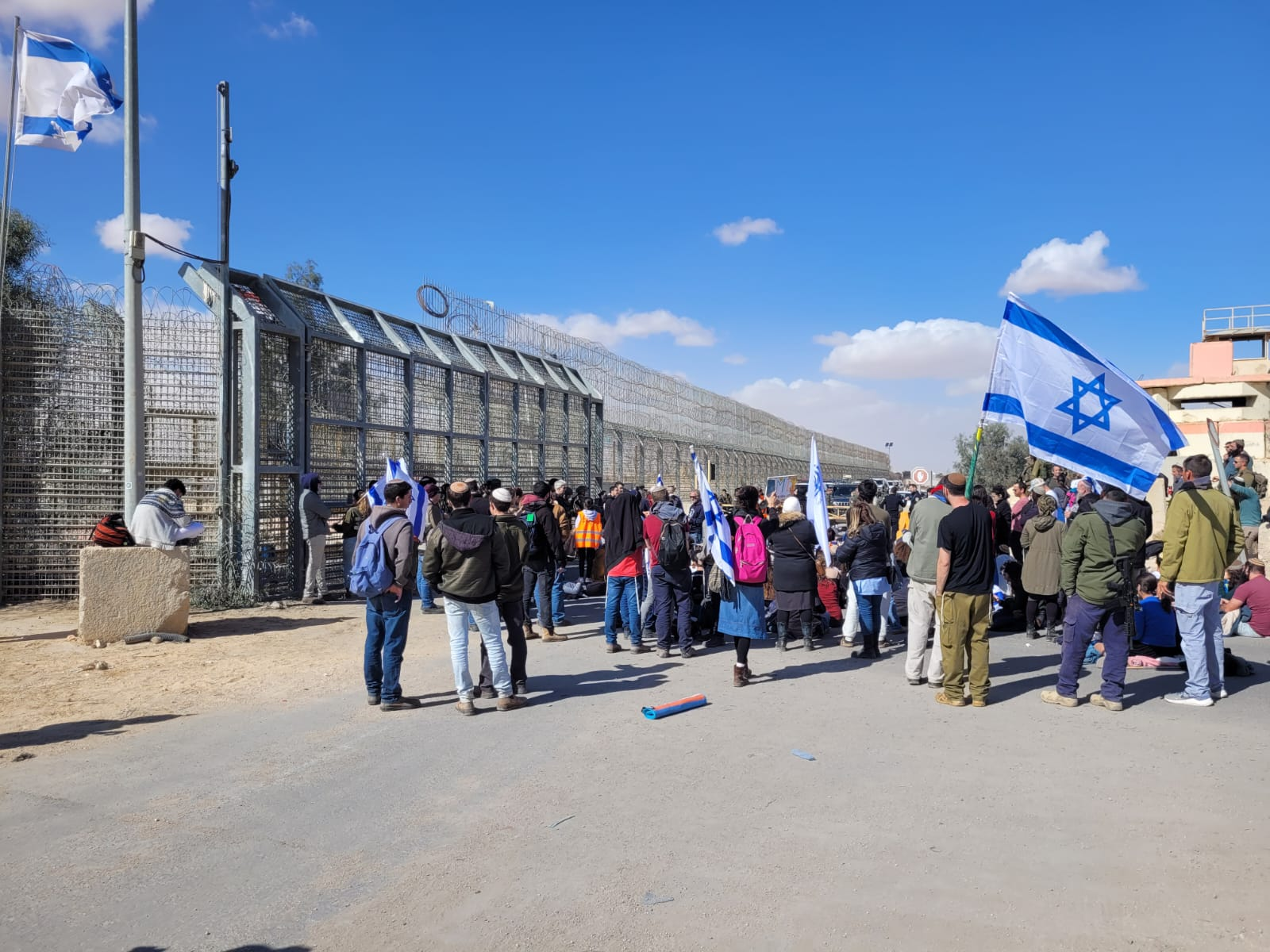
Tsav 9 blockade

Tsav 9 (Hebrew: צו 9, lit. 'Order 9') is a right-wing organization based in Israel, formed by some of the families of people taken hostage by Hamas fighters from Israel to the Gaza Strip and their supporters with alleged ties to the Israel army reservists and Jewish settlers in the West Bank. It has an estimated membership count of over 400 people. The group has been involved in protests and actions against the delivery of humanitarian aid to the Gaza Strip. On 14 June 2024, the United States State Department officially added the group to its list of sanctioned entities for impeding the delivery of humanitarian aid to the Gaza Strip, categorizing it as a "violent extremist group".

== Origin ==
Founded on Facebook in January 2024, the group originated from an appeal on the website which garnered it 50 members. The group began conducting real-world demonstrations, and its membership later increased to over 400. It was formed by Israeli settlers, IDF reservists, and families of hostages taken during the 7 October attacks. Its name is in reference to the IDF's 'Order 8', the emergency mobilization order for Israeli reservists, that was also activated on 7 October 2023, the day of the Hamas massacre in Israel's south.

== Activities ==
The group has led numerous protests against humanitarian aid trucks en route to the Gaza Strip, whose tactics include blockading roads, damaging trucks and cargo, and assaulting drivers and IDF soldiers.

The group's first physical activity, starting 18 January 2024, saw dozens of members of the group blocking over 100 trucks carrying humanitarian aid to enter the Gaza Strip by camping in front of the Kerem Shalom border crossing for three days. On 24 January, the group once again blocked trucks at the crossing for six hours. Hundreds of members of Tsav 9 and another group, Mothers of IDF Soldiers, blockaded 60 aid trucks from Egypt, forcing 51 of them to return. Two days later, it once again blocked aid trucks at the crossing.

The group accused the United Nations Relief and Works Agency of aiding Hamas during a protest in front of the agency's offices in Jerusalem in March.

On 7 May 2024, members of the group blocked and attacked a Gaza aid convoy at the Latrun Junction near Jerusalem. They blocked the trucks for four hours while puncturing tires and damaging cargo. Six members were arrested by Israel Police, and the group claimed that one of its members was knocked unconscious by officers.

On 13 May 2024, members of the group looted and then set fire to two aid trucks near Hebron in the West Bank.

On 21 May 2025, members of the group attempted to block Gaza aid convoy in Kerem Shalom border crossing. In this activity, they cooperated with a like-minded group, The Israeli Reservists - Generation of Victory. Members blocked aid trucks on the following days as well, but were confronted by Israel Border Police and members of the Standing Together movement.

On 17 October 2025, a group of nine from within the organization people blocked aid at the Kerem Shalom crossing.

== Ideology ==
The group describes itself as a non-partisan organization that represents people on the right and left, as well as secular and religious individuals. It also claims to represent city, kibbutz, and village residents; including those who were evacuated, released reservists and the families of fallen soldiers. Despite the group's assertion, it has been described as right-wing to far-right by some, including by The Times of Israel. The US Department of State described it as a violent extremist group. It is reportedly affiliated with NGOs tied to Israeli far-right Minister of National Security Itamar Ben-Gvir.

The group has demanded that all aid to Palestinians in Gaza be stopped until all the hostages taken during the 7 October Hamas attack are returned to the country. A recurring belief in the group is that up to 70% of humanitarian aid delivered to Gaza is taken by Hamas, an assessment made by the head of Shin Bet, Ronen Bar. The Qatari-owned media group The New Arab claims that its opposition to humanitarian aid for the Gaza Strip is "identical to the Israeli far-right's".

== Reception ==
=== Israel ===
The group has received mixed reactions from the Israeli public. Two-thirds of Jewish Israelis oppose sending humanitarian aid to Gaza, according to a February poll and it has been reported that "Several polls indicate that a majority of Israelis favour limiting or halting humanitarian aid to Gaza." The group sees support among Israeli far-right activists and organizations as well as some of the families of Israeli victims and hostages of the Israel–Hamas war. However, much of the Israeli public criticizes the group, seeing its actions as worsening the Gaza Strip humanitarian crisis.

Among its critics are Haaretz journalist Dahlia Scheindlin, who called the opposition to aid "grotesque...Tzav 9 claims to represent a cross section of Israeli society, especially the families of hostages, but videos from the protests showed that many wore the distinct clothing of far-right religious activists. So there are two substreams. The segment who represent family members of hostages believe that starving the whole population in Gaza is the most effective means of securing the captives' release. The far-right ideologues among them have a different agenda: to brand all Gazan civilians as Hamas, so that all of them are legitimate targets."

During one of its protests in the West Bank, the group was met by counter-protesters from the Jewish-Arab group Standing Together.

The group's actions have received support from Israeli Finance Minister Bezalel Smotrich and a number of local politicians. Minister of National Security Itamar Ben Gvir instructed police to refrain from protecting convoys. Ben Gvir's repeated interference with the conduct of the police has been raised in the Supreme Court.

=== International ===
The group has sparked outrage internationally. The group's attacks on trucks near Hebron on 13 May received condemnation from US National Security Advisor Jake Sullivan, who called its behavior "completely and utterly unacceptable".

The US-based Democracy for the Arab World Now called for sanctions against the group.

On 14 June 2024, the U.S. Department of State sanctioned Tsav 9 saying: "For months, individuals from Tzav 9 have repeatedly sought to thwart the delivery of humanitarian aid to Gaza, including by blockading roads, sometimes violently, along their route from Jordan to Gaza, including in the West Bank. They also have damaged aid trucks and dumped life-saving humanitarian aid onto the road...The Government of Israel has a responsibility to ensure the safety and security of humanitarian convoys transiting Israel and the West Bank enroute to Gaza. We will not tolerate acts of sabotage and violence targeting this essential humanitarian assistance. We will continue to use all tools at our disposal to promote accountability for those who attempt or undertake such heinous acts, and we expect and urge that Israeli authorities do the same...The Department is sanctioning Tzav 9 pursuant to section 1 (a)(i)(A) of Executive Order (E.O.) 14115..."

=== Actions taken against Tsav 9 ===
==== Online ====
Middle East Eye reported that the group's accounts on Instagram and Facebook were suspended in May 2024. The report was later confirmed by Meta Platforms, who said that they were suspended for violating its Coordinating Harm Policy, which states that "users cannot facilitate, organize, promote, or admit criminal activities." However, Arab News reported that the group continued its activities on Instagram under a different username.

==== Sanctions ====
In May 2024, The Times of Israel reported that the US was considering sanctioning the group. On 14 June, the US Treasury Department's Office of Foreign Assets Control listed the group as sanctioned, freezing its US assets and prohibiting Americans from aiding the group. The group, shocked by the sanctions, stated that "It is a fatal blow to the families who aim to stop the aid to the enemy Hamas in time of war," and claimed that they went against American and liberal values.

The European Union imposed sanctions on Tsav 9 on 15 July 2024, and the United Kingdom imposed sanctions on 17 November 2026.
