= Sally Abed =

Palestinian peace activist and politician (born 1991)

- سالي عابد
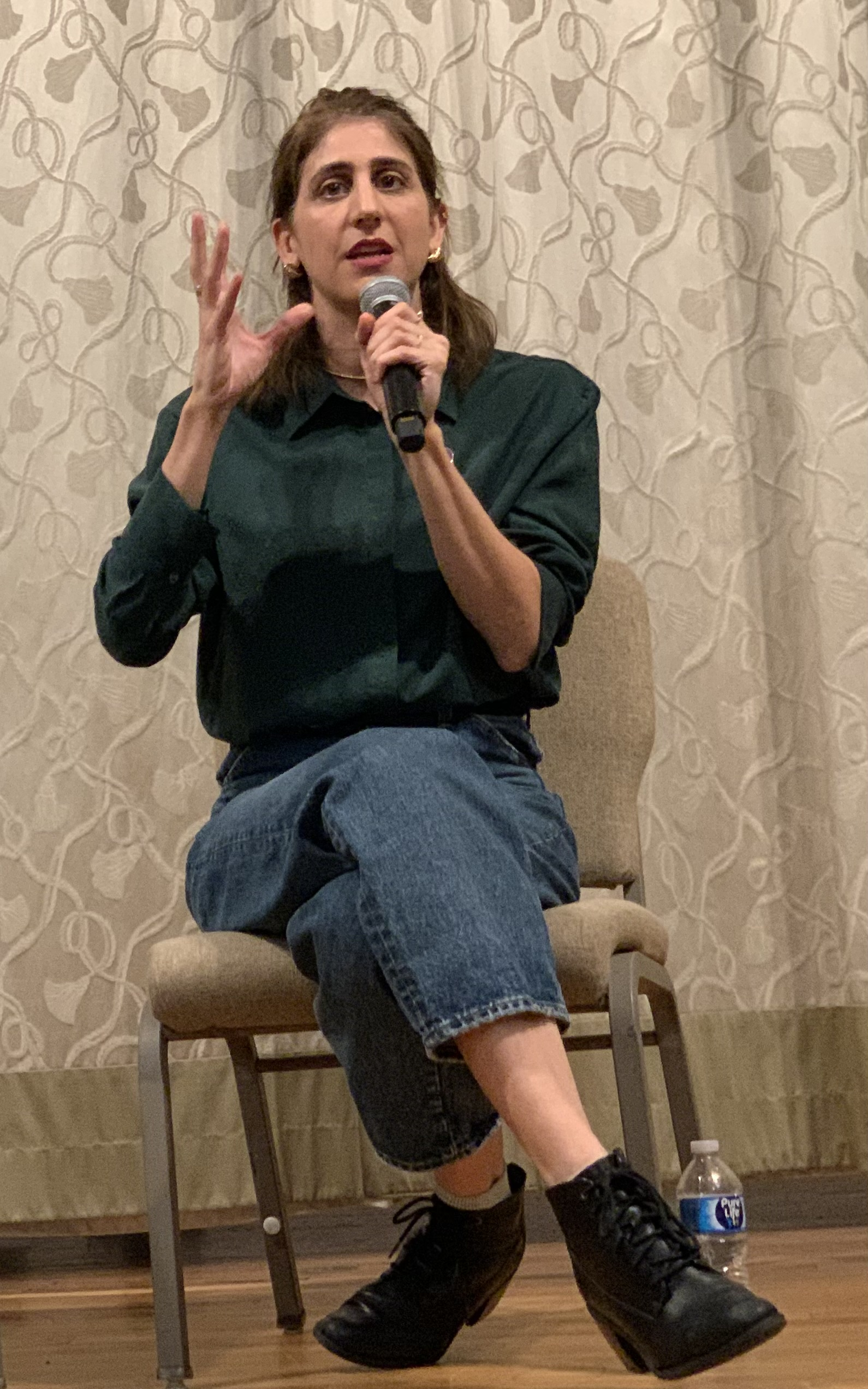
- Sally Abed speaking at the Philadelphia Ethical Society in November 2025

Member of the Haifa city council
- Constituency: Haifa

Personal details
- Born: 1991 (age 34–35)
- Education: Earlham College

Sally Abed (Arabic: سالي عابد; born 1991) is a Palestinian-Israeli peace activist and politician. She is a leader in the Standing Together movement and a member of Haifa's city council.

== Early life and education ==
Abed grew up in Mi'ilya, an Arab village in the western Galilee. Her family was not political; her father had given up politics following an arrest in the 1980s for his involvement with the Communist party. Both of her parents worked for the Israeli government. She became interested in justice from a young age, and would "stand up against – but also have compassion for – the class bully". She received the nickname "the justice princess" from her mother.

Abed attended Earlham College in the United States, where she earned her bachelor's degree in economics and political science. She returned to Israel in 2015. (Note: Another source says she returned to Israel in 2019.)

== Career and activism ==
=== Political career ===
Prior to the onset of the Israel-Hamas war, Abed had been planning for Haifa's municipal elections, where she was campaigning as "head of a new joint Jewish-Arab list". In February 2024, she was elected to Haifa's city council. She was appointed Chairman of the Board of Directors of Haifa Museums in April that same year.

=== Activism and beliefs ===
Abed discovered the Standing Together movement in 2015. She had felt frustrated by the lack of opportunities and support for her as a woman, Palestinian, and Israeli citizen, and the organization provided her with a platform for activism and a community of like-minded individuals who shared her interests and aspirations. By 2021 she was a leader in the movement, which had become one of the largest grassroots organizations mobilizing Israeli citizens who wanted to end violence as a mechanism for addressing the Israeli–Palestinian conflict. At the time, she stated that protests were organized to demand a ceasefire and an end to the occupation, emphasizing that a military offensive in Gaza could not guarantee the safety of Israelis.

In November 2023, after the October 7 attacks, Abed and fellow Standing Together leader Alon-Lee Green went on a speaking tour on the East Coast of the U.S. to discuss their work. They visited D.C., New York City, and the Boston area where thousands of people came to hear them speak. Their message was that Israeli Jews and Palestinians urgently need to become partners and move beyond pro-Israel and pro-Palestine labels. They emphasized that Israelis and Palestinians deserve a new narrative and that "radical empathy" was essential. They were dismayed that Americans focused on litmus tests, statements and ultimatums, especially on college campuses.

In early 2024, she emphasized that Palestinians in Israel, like Israeli Jews, were also experiencing deep trauma, describing the frustration of being in mourning yet unable to openly express that grief, which was intensified by the fact that many Israeli Jews seemed unaware that Palestinians in Israel often have family in Gaza. She described Israeli society as largely gripped by intense emotions of anger and vengeance, which made openly expressing her grief challenging. Abed has emphasized the importance of a bilateral cease-fire and two-state solution, and says she only believes this will happen if Israeli Jews believe it is in their own self interest. Her goal is to continue building a social movement to shift the narrative that Israeli security can only be achieved by military occupation of Palestinian territories.

== Personal life ==
Abed and her husband live in Haifa's Wadi Salib neighborhood.
