= Helen Hansma =

Helen Greenwood Hansma
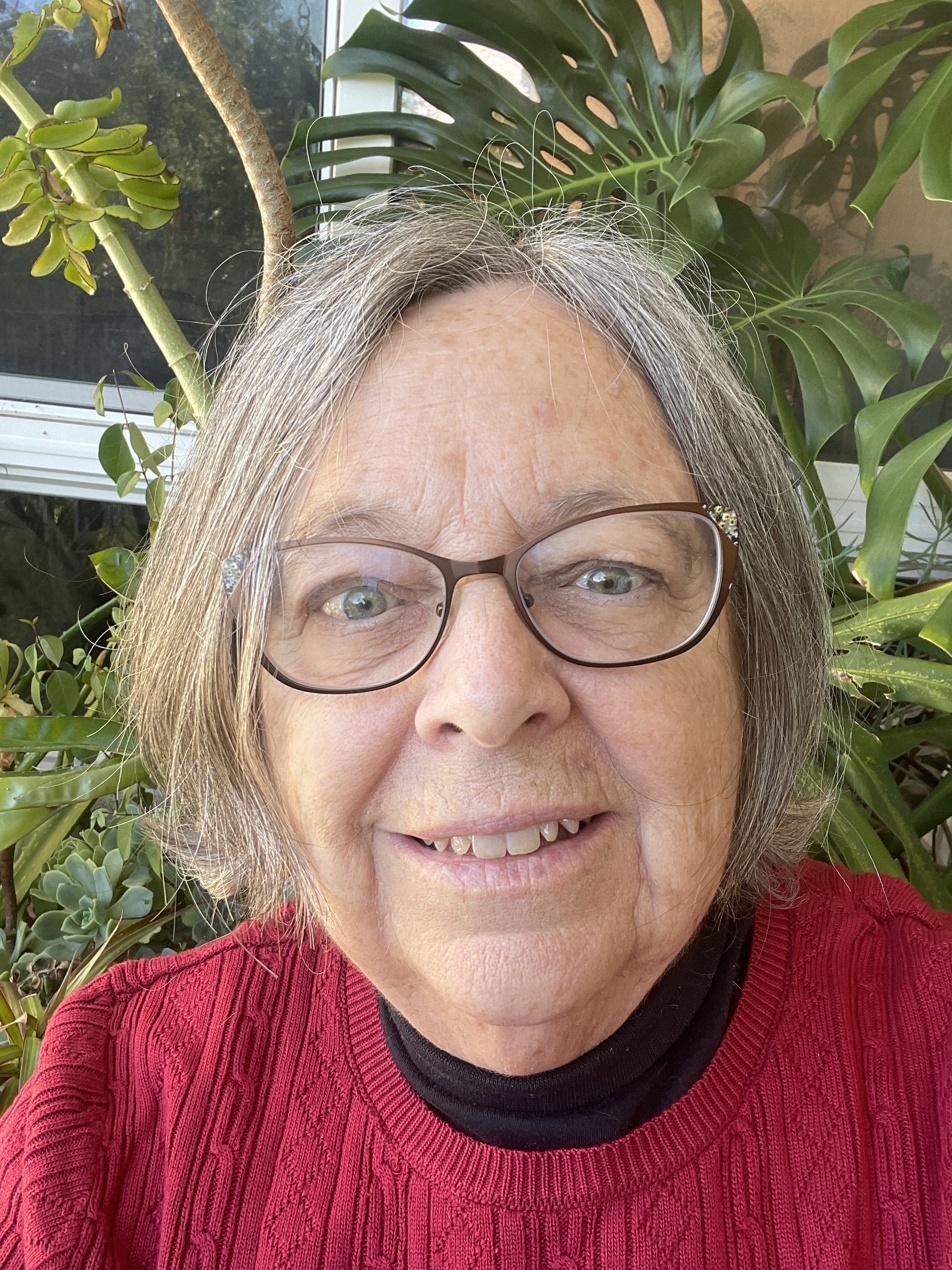
- Helen Hansma in 2024
- Occupations: Biologist, biophysicist, biochemist, and academic

Academic background
- Education: B.S. in Chemistry; M.S. in Biochemistry; PhD in Biological Sciences
- Alma mater: Earlham College; University of California, Berkeley; University of California, Santa Barbara
- Thesis: Biochemical Studies on the Behavioral Mutants of Paramecium aurelia: Ion Fluxes and Ciliary Membrane Proteins (1974)
- Doctoral advisor: Ching Kung

Helen Greenwood Hansma is an American biologist, biophysicist, biochemist, and academic. She is a Researcher Emeritus and Associate Adjunct Professor Emeritus at the University of California, Santa Barbara.

Hansma's research revolves around understanding the origin of life and proposes that life originated between mica sheets in micaceous clay. She has contributed to the fields of biophysics and biochemistry through her work on biomolecular materials, DNA-protein interactions, and the applications of atomic force microscopy to biological materials.

== Education ==
Hansma earned her bachelor's degree in chemistry from Earlham College in 1967, researching zinc-azine coordination compounds with William Stratton. Then she obtained a master's degree in biochemistry at the University of California, Berkeley, under the supervision of H. A. Barker. Her 1969 thesis was titled "Separation of Basic Amino Acids and Resolution of D and L Isomers by Gas Liquid Chromatography." She then did research in the UC Berkeley Nutrition Department on cholesterol-fed guinea pigs in the lab of Rosemarie Ostwald. In 1972, she enrolled in the Ph.D. program in Biological Sciences at the University of California, Santa Barbara, where she studied behavioral mutants of Paramecium aurelia. Her research explored ion fluxes and ciliary membrane proteins in the lab of Ching Kung. Her thesis was titled "Biochemical Studies on the Behavioral Mutants of Paramecium aurelia: Ion Fluxes and Ciliary Membrane Proteins".

== Career ==
In 1977, Hansma started her academic career as an Assistant Research Biologist at the University of California, Santa Barbara, where she worked as the Principal Investigator of "The Molecular Mechanism of Membrane Excitation in Paramecium". She then held appointments as Science Consultant at Isla Vista School from 1981 to 1988 and at the University of California, Santa Barbara, starting in 1987 as an Assistant Research Biochemist in the Department of Physics. She was promoted to Associate Research Biochemist in 1993. In addition to her research appointments, she also served as an Adjunct Associate Professor at UCSB from 1998 to 2004. From 2004 to 2008 she was a Program Manager at the NSF Directorate for Biological Sciences–Division of Biological Infrastructure (BIO-DBI). Since 2008, she has held the positions of Researcher Emeritus and Associate Adjunct Professor Emeritus at the University of California, Santa Barbara.

== Research ==
Hansma's research interests span the fields of biophysics and biochemistry. Working with Paul Hansma in the Physics Department, she applied Atomic Force Microscopy (AFM) to study biomolecules. She was the Principal Investigator of NSF grants from 1991 to 1994, 1994–1997, 1997–2000 and 2000–2003. She has conducted research on imaging and manipulating molecules on mica surfaces using AFM. Since 2007, her major area of research is the origin of life. She hypothesizes that life originated between mica sheets and that the mechanical energy of mica sheets, moving apart and together, might have provided energy before chemical energy was available.

=== Atomic force microscopy (AFM) of DNA and lipids ===
Hansma has worked on the applying AFM of DNA to illustrate its structure, its surface biology, its motion, and its condensation. She described advances in AFM of DNA and the benefits of using an aqueous solution for the imaging of DNA with AFM. She then investigated the adsorption of DNA to various substrates using AFM and showed that the presence of a divalent cation greatly improves DNA adsorption, which requires electrostatic adsorption to the surface. In related research, she used AFM to image small fragments of DNA that have been labeled with a chimeric protein fusion between streptavidin and two immunoglobulin G-binding domains of staphylococcal protein A. While analyzing the efficacy of different modes of AFM she highlighted that the resolution is best in propanol while tapping AFM in dry helium provides a convenient way of imaging conformations of DNA molecules and positions of proteins on DNA. In an aqueous buffer, DNA molecules as small as 300 bp have been imaged even when in motion. She found that the binding of DNA to mica is correlated with the radius of the transition metal cation.

Hansma also examined the potential applications of atomic force microscopy (AFM) of DNA to the human genome project and stated that the AFM is capable of imaging DNA reproducibly but is not capable of sequencing DNA without further improvements. Additionally, she has worked on the AFM of lipids and showed its usefulness in imaging biological processes. She has also studied lipid membranes and showed that AFM was capable of visualizing the defects in the lipid bilayers.

=== Atomic force microscopy of spider silks and bacterial biofilms ===
Near the turn of the millennium, Hansma's research included the AFM of spider silks and bacterial biofilms. She evaluated the use of atomic force microscopy and single-molecule force spectroscopy to study the structure of spider dragline silk and demonstrated its modular sacrificial bonds that contribute to its strength and toughness. Using an artificial silk protein provided by researchers from the U.S. Army Natick R&D Center, she then presented models for molecular and supramolecular structures of the protein, derived from amino acid sequences, force spectroscopy, and stretching of bulk capture web. Furthermore, with Patricia Holden and members of her lab, she analyzed the surface properties and physical morphology of Pseudomonas putida biofilms and investigated how biofilm bacteria adapt to low nutrient availability in unsaturated environments.

=== Origin of life and mica sheets ===
Hansma is also known for her work on mica sheets and the origin of life. In her paper, "Possible origin of life between mica sheets: does life imitate mica?" she explored various elements that support her hypothesis regarding the origin of life between mica sheets. She noted that these sheets provide stable compartments, mechanical energy for bond formation, and isolation needed for Darwinian evolution. Moving mica sheets have the ability to facilitate mechanochemistry, resulting in the synthesis of prebiotic organic molecules. She highlighted key resemblances between life and the hypothetical origin between mica sheets. In 2014, she suggested that the likelihood of life's emergence increases with an increase in molecular crowding, and the confined spaces between Muscovite mica sheets provide advantages for the origins of life.

Later, in 2017, Hansma proposed that membraneless organelles, or biomolecular condensates, may have existed prior to the emergence of membrane-bound structures during the origins of life. These biomolecular condensates typically contain RNA and protein and could have formed and sheltered in the interstitial spaces between mica sheets, which offer favorable conditions for the origin and development of life. During her research on the origin of life, she discussed the prevalence of mechanical forces and mechanical energy in living cells and suggested that these may have preceded chemical energy at life's origins.

== Personal life ==
Hansma has two children and two grandchildren.

== Selected articles ==
- Hansma, H. G., Vesenka, J., Siegerist, C., Kelderman, G., Morrett, H., Sinsheimer, R. L., ... & Hansma, P. K. (1992). Reproducible imaging and dissection of plasmid DNA under liquid with the atomic force microscope. Science, 256(5060), 1180–1184.
- Hansma, H. G., & Hoh, J. H. (1994). Biomolecular imaging with the atomic force microscope. Annual review of biophysics and biomolecular structure, 23(1), 115–140.
- Radmacher, M., Fritz, M., Hansma, H. G., & Hansma, P. K. (1994). Direct observation of enzyme activity with the atomic force microscope. Science, 265(5178), 1577–1579.
- Hansma, H. G. (2001). Surface biology of DNA by atomic force microscopy. Annual Review of Physical Chemistry, 52(1), 71–92.
- Hansma, H. G. (2010). Possible Origin of Life between Mica Sheets. Journal of Theoretical Biology, 266, 175-188
- Hansma, H. G. (2022). DNA and the origins of life in micaceous clay. Biophysical Journal, 121(24), 4867–4873.
- Hansma, H. G. (2023). Liquid–liquid phase separation at the origins of life. In Droplets of Life (pp. 251–268). Academic Press.
