= Robert M. Hirsch =

Hydrologist (born 1949)

Robert M. Hirsch (born June 6, 1949) is a research hydrologist and a former Associate Director for Water of the U.S. Geological Survey. As Associate Director (also known as Chief Hydrologist), he was responsible for the water science programs of the USGS. These include water-related research, the collection of data on rivers and ground water, assessments of water quantity and quality. He served as the leader of USGS water science from 1994 to 2008 when Dr. Hirsch transitioned to the USGS National Research Program to rededicate himself to advancing the science on critical issues of climate change and long-term trends in water resources.

He began his USGS career in 1976 as a hydrologist and has conducted research on water quality statistical methods (trends and fluxes), water supply reliability, and flood frequency analysis. He has served as: Acting Director of the USGS during an interim period between Directors (August 1993 to March 1994); Assistant Chief Hydrologist for Research and External Coordination (1989–1993); and Staff Assistant to the Assistant Secretary for Water and Science, U.S. Department of the Interior (1987–1988). His research has focused on creating and adapting statistical methods for the analysis of water data, and relationship of water resources to climate change. He is co-author of the textbook Statistical Methods in Water Resources.

He graduated from Highland Park High School, Highland Park, Illinois, in 1967. He earned a bachelor of arts in Geology at Earlham College in 1971, an MS in Geology at the University of Washington in 1974, and a Ph.D. from The Johns Hopkins University from the Department of Geography and Environmental Engineering in 1976.

== Awards and recognition ==
- 1994 – Presidential Rank Award of Meritorious Senior Executive
- 1994 – Distinguished Service Award, U.S. Department of the Interior
- 1995 – Outstanding Alumni Award, Earlham College
- 1995 – Fellow, American Association for the Advancement of Science
- 1996 – Water Management Achievement Award, Interstate Council on Water Policy
- 2003 – Presidential Rank Award of Meritorious Senior Executive
- 2006 – William C. Ackermann Medal for Excellence in Water Management from the American Water Resources Association (AWRA)
- 2017 – Walter Langbein Lecture, American Geophysical Union
