= Project of Translation from Arabic =

Arabic to English

The Project of Translation from Arabic (or PROTA) is an academic project initiated by Dr Salma Khadra Jayyusi in 1980 in order to translate, and publish, works of Arabic literature into the English language. The stated goal of PROTA is "the dissemination of Arabic culture and literature abroad". The project had its genesis in the late 1970s when Columbia University Press invited Jayyusi to prepare a large anthology of modern Arabic literature. Funding came from the Iraqi Ministry of Information and Culture. Two major anthologies came out of this early endeavour: Modern Arabic Poetry (1987) and The Literature of Modern Arabia (1988).

PROTA has published more than 30 titles since its inception. Among these are anthologies of fiction, poetry and drama, as well as single-author books of poetry, short stories, novellas, and novels. In its first decade, PROTA published works by leading Arab authors such as Nizar Qabbani, Ghassan Kanafani, Emile Habîby, Sahar Khalîfah, Ibrâhîm Nasrallâh, Hannâ Mînah and Zayd Dammâj. In 1992, PROTA was joined by another Jayyusi initiative, the East-West Nexus. The Project has since grown from the effort of several academics to a loose network of numerous translators and advisers.

Two PROTA academics, Salma Jayyusi and Roger Allen, were involved in the proceedings that preceded the awarding of the Nobel Prize in Literature to the Egyptian writer Naguib Mahfouz. A number of other prominent academics have played key roles in translating for the project, including Naomi Shihab Nye.

== Selected works translated by East-West Nexus/PROTA ==
A partial list of PROTA books:

- Liyânah Badr. A Balcony Over the Fakihani: Three Novellas. Brooklyn: Interlink Books, 1993. Translated by Peter Clark and Christopher Tingley.
- Hamza Bogary. The Sheltered Quarter: A Tale of Boyhood in Mecca. Austin, TX: University of Texas Press, 1991. Translated by Olive Kenny and Jeremy Reed.
- Zayd Mûtî Dammâj. The Hostage. New York: Interlink Books, 1993. Translated by May Jayyusi and Christopher Tingley.
- Emile Habiby. The Secret Life of Saeed, the Ill-fated Pessoptimist: A Palestinian who became a Citizen of Israel. New York: Vantage Press, 1982. Translated by Salma Khadra Jayyusi and Trevor LeGassick.
- Salma Khadra Jayyusi, ed. The Literature of Modern Arabia. Austin, TX: University of Texas Press, 1988.
- Salma Khadra Jayyusi, ed. Anthology of Modern Palestinian Literature. New York: Columbia University Press, 1992.
- Salma Khadra Jayyusi, ed. Modern Arabic Poetry: An Anthology. New York: Columbia University Press, 1987.
- Salma Khadra Jayyusi, ed. Short Arabic Plays: An Anthology. Interlink Books, New York, 2003.
- Salma Khadra Jayyusi, ed. Modern Arabic Fiction: An Anthology. Columbia University Press, New York, 2005. ISBN 978-0-231-13255-8
- Salma Khadra Jayyusi, ed. The Legacy of Muslim Spain. EJ Brill, Leiden, 1992.
- Salma Khadra Jayyusi, ed. Human Rights in Arab Thought: A Reader. I.B. Tauris, London & New York, 2008.
- Salma Khadra Jayyusi, ed. Tales of Juha: Classic Arab Folk Humor. 2006. Translated by Matthew Sorenson, Faisal Khadra and Christopher Tingley.
- Salma Khadra Jayyusi and Roger Allen, eds. Modern Arabic Drama: An Anthology. Indiana University Press, Bloomington, 1995.
- Salma Khadra Jayyusi, Mansour al-Hazimi, Ezzat Khattab, eds. Beyond The Dunes: An Anthology of Modern Saudi Literature. IB Tauris, 2006.
- Salma Khadra Jayyusi and Zafar Ishaq Ansari, eds. My Jerusalem: Essays, Reminiscences and Poems. Interlink Books, 2004.
- Ghassan Kanafani. All That's Left to You: A Novella and Other Stories. Austin, TX: Center for Middle Eastern Studies, University of Texas at Austin, 1990. Translated by May Jayyusi and Jeremy Reed.
- Sahar Khalifah. Wild Thorns. London: Al-Saqi Books, 1986. Translated by Trevor LeGassick and Elizabeth Fernea.
- Mûhammad Mâghût. The Fan of Swords. Washington, DC: Three Continents Press, 1991. Translated by May Jayyusi and Naomi Shihab Nye.
- Hanna Mina. Fragments of Memory: A Story of a Syrian Family. Austin, TX: University of Texas Press, 1993. Translated by Olive Kenny and Lorne Kenny.
- Khaldoun Ḥasan al-Naqeeb. Society and State in the Gulf and Arab Peninsula: A Different Perspective. Routledge, 1990. Translated by Lorne Kenny and Ibrahim Hayani.
- Ibrâhîm Nasrallâh. Prairies of Fever. New York: Interlink Books, 1993. Translated by May Jayyusi and Jeremy Reed.
- Jamal Saleem Nuweihed, narrator. Abu Jmeel's Daughter & Other Stories: Arab Folk Tales from Palestine and Lebanon. Translated by Christopher Tingley. Interlink Books, 2002.
- Nizar Qabbani. On Entering the Sea: The Erotic and Other Poetry of Nizar Qabbani. Interlink Books, 1996. Translated by Lena Jayyusi and Sharif Elmusa.
- Mûhammad Yûsuf Qu'ayyd. War in the Land of Egypt. London: Al-Saqi Books, 1986. Translated by Olive Kenny, Lorne Kenny and Christopher Tingley.
- Abû al-Qâsim Shâbbî. Mudhakkirât. Translated as Songs of Life. Tunis: al-Sharikah al-Wâtanîyah lil-Nashr wa al-Tawzî, 1977. Translated by Lena Jayyusi and Naomi Shihab Nye.
- Thomas L. Thompson, ed. Jerusalem in Ancient History and Tradition. T&T Clark International, London and New York, 2003.
- Fadwa Tuqan. A Mountainous Journey: A Poet's Autobiography. 1990. Translated by Olive Kenny.
- The Adventures of Sayf Ben Dhi Yazan: An Arab Folk Epic. Indiana University Press, 1996. Translated and narrated by Lena Jayyusi.

== See also ==
- List of Arabic-English translators
- Banipal Prize for Arabic Literary Translation
