= Swamp (disambiguation) =

A swamp is a wooded wetland.

Swamp or The Swamp may also refer to:

== Books and comics ==
- Swamp (comic strip), a comic strip by Gary Clark
- The Swamp (novel), a 1977 novel by Hanna Mina
- The Swamp, a 1976 book by Bill Thomas
- The Swamp: The Everglades, Florida, and the Politics of Paradise, a 2006 book by Michael Grunwald

== Film and television ==
- The Swamp (1921 film), a silent film starring Sessue Hayakawa and Bessie Love
- The Swamp, a 2019 film produced by television series American Experience
- The Swamp (documentary), a 2020 documentary film by HBO
- The Swamp (Ireland), a 1996–1998 summer replacement for the television series The Den on RTÉ
- "The Swamp" (Avatar: The Last Airbender), a television episode
- The Swamp, a tent that was home to the main characters in the film MASH and television series M*A*S*H

== Music ==
- Swamp music (disambiguation) or simply swamp, a type of American popular music
- The Swamp, a studio space associated with GWAR record label Slave Pit Inc.
- Swamp (album), by Phil Thornalley, 1988
- Swamp, an album by Partisans with Julian Siegel, 2014
- "Swamp" (That Petrol Emotion song), 1987
- "Swamp" (Brockhampton song), 2017
- "Swamp", a song by Talking Heads from Speaking in Tongues, 1983
- "Swamp", a song by Telepopmusik from Angel Milk, 2005
- "The Swamp", a song by Gruff Rhys from American Interior, 2014

== Acronyms ==
- Southern Waste Management Partnership, Northern Ireland, UK
- SouthWest Association of Mountain Bike Pedalers, a bike trail building organization in Tampa, Florida, U.S.

== Places nicknamed The Swamp ==
- Ben Hill Griffin Stadium, the football stadium at the University of Florida in Gainesville
- Cajun Field, the football stadium at the University of Louisiana at Lafayette
- Cypress Lake (Lafayette, Louisiana), also on the UL Lafayette campus
- Giants Stadium, a football stadium near New York City from 1976 to 2010
- The Swamp (LSUS), the soccer stadium at Louisiana State University Shreveport

== See also ==
- Swamp Creek (disambiguation)
- La Cienega (disambiguation)
- Drain the swamp, an idiom of political rhetoric
