= Anton Shammas =

Palestinian writer, poet and translator (born 1950)

Anton Shammas (Arabic: أنطون شماس, Hebrew: אנטון שמאס; born 1950), is a Palestinian writer, poet and translator of Arabic, Hebrew and English.

== Biography ==
Anton Shammas was one of six children born to a Palestinian father, whose ancestors came from the town of Khabab, in modern-day Syria, and a Lebanese mother, who moved to Fassuta in the north of the British Palestine in 1937 to teach at the local girls' school. In 1962, the family moved to Haifa where Shammas studied in an integrated Jewish-Arab high school. In 1968, Shammas moved to Jerusalem and studied English and Arabic literature and art history at the Hebrew University of Jerusalem.

Shammas left Jerusalem in 1987 and now lives in the United States, where he is a professor of Comparative Literature and Near Eastern Studies at the University of Michigan.

== Literary career ==
Shammas was one of the founders of the Arabic magazine "The East" (Arabic: الشرق), which he edited from 1971 to 1976. His first poem was published in the literary supplement of Haaretz newspaper. In 1974, Shammas published his first collection of poetry in Arabic, "Imprisoned in my Own Awakening and Sleep" (Arabic: اسير يقظتي ونومي ), as well as a collection of Hebrew poems, "Hardcover" (Hebrew: כריכה קשה). In 1979, he published his book of poems "No Man's Land" (Hebrew: שטח הפקר). He also wrote for some Hebrew newspapers. Some of his articles explored the problem of Arab identity in a Jewish state.

Shammas is known mainly for his writing in Hebrew and Hebrew translations of Arabic literature, such as the novels of Emile Habibi. His acclaimed Hebrew novel Arabesques (1986) was translated into eight languages, including English, Spanish, French, German, Italian, although it has never appeared in Arabic. It was reviewed upon its American publication on the front page of The New York Times Book Review (by William Gass), on April 17, 1988. It was chosen later by the editors of The New York Times Book Review as one of the best seven fiction works of 1988. Shammas has also translated Arabic poetry into Hebrew and English.

== Awards ==
- 1991-1992 Whiting Award
- Lila Wallace Writers' Award, 1993-96.

== Published work ==
=== Prose ===
- Arabesques, a novel in Hebrew (Arabeskot) (1986)
- The Biggest Liar in the World, a children's book in Hebrew (1982)

=== Poetry ===
- Imprisoned in My Own Awakening and Sleep, poems in Arabic (1974)
- Hardcover, poems in Hebrew (1974)
- No Man's Land, poems in Hebrew (1979)

=== Plays ===
- Ghassil Wijjak ya Qamar (Wash your Face, Moon) (Arabic), for The Arab Theater, Haifa (1997)
- Stuffed Ducks, a play in progress (Hebrew and English), for River Arts, Woodstock (1989)
- Ta'ah bil-hayt (A Hole in the Wall), a bilingual play for young adults (Arabic and Hebrew), Haifa Theater (1978–79)

=== Fiction ===
- Arabesque, Harper's Magazine, March 1988
- The Retreat From Galilee, Granta 23 (London), Spring 1988

=== Translations ===
Hebrew into Arabic

- Miriam Yalan-Shteklis, Selected Poems and Stories (for children)(1972)
- Ka-Tzetnik, Star Eternal, (1975)
- David Rokeah, Selected Poems (1977)
- David Avidan, Selected Poems(1982)
- The Doe Hunt, Hebrew short stories (1984)

Arabic into Hebrew

- Emile Habibi, Al-Waqa'i al ghareebah fi ikhtifa' Sa'id Abi an-Nahs al-Mutashaa'il (The Secret Life of Saeed the Pessoptimist) (1984).
- Emile Habibi, Ekhtayyeh (1988).
- Emile Habibi, Khurrafeyyat Sarayah Bint al-Ghoul (Saraya, the Ogre's Daughter)(1993).
- Taha Muhammad Ali, Poems (2006).

Arabic into English

- Three poems by Hilmy Salem (Banipal, No. 7, Spring 2000)
- Three poems by Salman Masalha (Banipal, No. 7, Spring 2000)
- Two poems by Mahmoud Darwish (Banipal, No. 4, Spring 1999)
- Three poems by Taha Muhammad Ali (Banipal, No. 2, Summer 1998)

English into Arabic and Hebrew

- Dario Fo, "The Accidental Death of an Anarchist," an adaptation for "The Arab Theater," Haifa (1996)
- Samuel Beckett, Waiting for Godot, a bilingual translation into Arabic and Hebrew for "Haifa Theater," Haifa (1984, 1994)
- Harold Pinter, The Dumb Waiter and Victoria Station, (1986)
- Edward Albee, The Zoo Story, for Beit Hagefen Theater, Haifa (1987) (Arabic)
- Athol Fugard, The Island, for Haifa Theater, (1983)

=== Editing ===
- Bab al-Shams, Elias Khoury, Hebrew translation published by Andalus, Tel-Aviv

== See also ==
- Palestinian Christians
