= Wild Thorns =

1976 novel by Sahar Khalifeh

- Author: Sahar Khalifeh
- Language: Arabic
- Published: 1976 (Galileo Limited)
- Publication place: Palestine
- ISBN: 1-56656-336-4

Wild Thorns (Arabic: الصبار, romanized: Al-Subar, lit. 'The Cactus') is a Palestinian novel written by Sahar Khalifeh that was first published in Arabic in 1976 by Galileo Limited. Interlink International Books translated it into English in 1985. The novel portrays the lives of Palestinians under Israeli occupation in the town of Nablus in 1972 by closely following the lives of cousins who have drastically different experiences under the occupation. The Arabic title of the novel means 'prickly pears' and indicates the sweetness at the center of something that appears to be harsh and dangerous.

== Summary ==
The novel begins with Usama's journey of returning to Nablus from the gulf countries by crossing the Allenby Bridge. There he is interrogated multiple times by Israeli Defense Forces. However, we learn that in his time outside of Palestine, he became a member of the resistance movement and has returned to complete a mission to blow up the Egged buses that transport Palestinian workers from the West Bank to Israel. Upon his arrival in Nablus, he meets with his cousin Adil, who he believes is accepting of Israel's occupation of the West Bank. Usama later learns that Adil abandoned the family-owned farm to work in Israeli factories to support his family who are struggling economically and becomes outraged since he believes that those who work in Israel are betraying their identity as Palestinians, and he is afraid that Adil might be one of the Palestinians in the buses he must blow up. Thus ensues the constant discussions and arguments between the two about the normalization of the occupation and the romanticization of the struggle, where Usama tries to convince Adil that he should join the resistance and where Adil tries to make Usama understand the reality of the responsibility of supporting and feeding one's family and how difficult it is to do that in the West Bank.

Meanwhile, Adil's brother Basil is in his last year of high school and often has political discussions with his friends. Usama overhears and partakes in some of these discussions and starts to be hopeful that this younger generation will bring freedom to Palestine. However, IDF soldiers arrest Basil a few days later for chanting political slogans in response to Israel's demolition of a family home in Nablus. While detained, Basil receives a political education from other prisoners, and he plans to join the resistance as soon he is released.

Basil hides the weapons that Usama plans to use for his mission in a secret vault in the family estate. When Usama carries out his mission, he fires his weapons at Israeli Soldiers and is joined by the other Palestinians on the bus, but neither Usama nor the others who join him survive the attack. Adil, however, is not on that bus because he spent the day helping his friend Abu Sabir find a lawyer.

Israeli soldiers learn that Basil harbored the weapons used in the attack, and the novel ends with IDF soldiers demolishing his family's ancestral home.

== Characters ==
- Usama is Adil's cousin who returns to Palestine after years of training to be a resistance fighter in the Gulf. He becomes disappointed with the normalization of Israel's occupation of Palestine.
- Adil Al-Karmi is Usama's cousin who abandons the family farm to work in Israeli factories because of the heavy burden of being the breadwinner of his large family. Other Palestinian laborers who work in Israel turn to him for help and advice, since he is knowledgeable and has leadership qualities.
- Basil Al-Karmi is Adil's younger brother who IDF soldiers imprison while he is in his final year of high school and who joins the resistance movement upon his release.
- Zuhdi is Adil's friend who also works in Israeli settlements to support his family.
- Nuwar Al-Karmi is Adil and Basil's sister, who is receiving her education in Education at Al-Najah University so that she may support her family and help in the education of her people.
- Abu Adil Al-Karmi is Adil's father who is experiencing health problems and depends on an expensive kidney machine to live. He spends a lot of time speaking with international journalists about the state of Palestine.
- Abu Sabir is Adil's friend who loses his fingers while working in an Israeli factory. However, because he does not have a working permit, the factory owner refuses to provide him with compensation for his loss. Adil urges him to take this matter to court, and he aids him in the process.
- Hajj Abdullah is the father of Basil's friend, Hani, and he is the owner of a supermarket in Nablus.
- Salih Al-Safadi is a political prisoner who organizes a people's school in prison, and he is in love with Nuwar Al-Karmi.
- Lina Al-Safadi is Nuwar's best friend and Salih's sister who is arrested at the end of novel and it is believed that Israeli Forces learned of Basil's harboring of weapons through her.

== Themes ==
Wild Thorns centers on issues of class disparity between upper and working-class Palestinians in the West Bank. Many characters face dilemmas throughout the novel complicated by their economic position as well as the Israeli occupation they live under. When Usama returns to Nablus with a mission to blow up an Egged bus transporting Palestinian workers, he is faced with the dilemma of disrupting the normalcy of Israel's occupation at the expense of working-class Palestinians (including Adil, his cousin). Adil is similarly faced with a dilemma in which he must work in Israel, contributing to the Israeli economy to provide for his family. These two cousins' dilemmas produce opposing results. "Usama is violent, and Adil passive. There is no in-between. The ideal character would be a combination of the two, but Khalifeh shows how that is impossible. The occupation produces only extremes in people." The novel reveals that class is a determining factor of where characters fall in their extremes.

Khalifeh also acknowledges the frustration Palestinians have with "just words." Adil's father is an older bedridden man who once belonged to the land-owning class and now entertains international journalists to speak on the injustices of the occupation. He tells journalists that Palestinian workers have no choice working in Israel but he is disgraced by his son Adil doing so; he supports armed struggle but rebukes his younger son Basil for participating in resistance. Abu Adil represents the older generation from the upper ranks of Palestinian society who claim to represent Palestinians' best interests but prove to be ineffectual leadership. When Zuhdi is imprisoned he meets another Adil, who is well-read on economic theories and even implements a socialist government within the Prison. Although he is educated on theories that address the welfare of the community he is described as heartless and detached from people. In an interview, Sahar Khalifeh shares "I began to read about the ideology of the proletariat—Marxism. I discovered that this was the solution, this was the solution to the whole sickness that covers the Arab world—the class stratification that makes it so unbalanced, so confused, the interests so conflicting." Khalifeh does not oppose leftist economic theories but critiques the detachment of theories from Palestinians' everyday lives under occupation.

Conflicting perceptions of masculinity is another major theme. Usama believes that man should not be passive but violently struggle against the occupation. In the end, Usama's militancy ultimately leads to martyrdom, the highest display of masculinity to a nationalist. Male characters with family responsibilities like Adil, Zuhdi, and Abu Saber define manhood in terms of their ability to provide. The youngest major character, Basil, believes he transitions from adolescence to manhood through his time in prison. He is congratulated on his first night in jail with the Arabic saying "السجن للرجال" that translates to "Prison is for men." His inmates even dub him Abu al Izz, or "father of glory", for his resistance. Through these characters, Khalifeh demonstrates that these performances of masculinity are incompatible. Zuhdi especially demonstrates that it is impossible to provide and participate in armed national struggle. In this way, navigating masculinity under the pressures of the occupation is nonproductive and can only yield dilemmas.

== Critical reception ==
Yehya Yakhlif criticized the novel for having a negative portrayal of the role of armed resistance and freedom fighters. Similarly, in an interview between Emile Habibi and Sahar Khalifeh, Habibi argues that the novel blames the victim and whitewashes the occupiers, since he believes she does not emphasize the horrible working conditions of Palestinians in Israel. He also criticizes her for keeping her own personal stances ambiguous. However, Khalifeh defends her novel by arguing that the poor working conditions and the class disparity in the West Bank is the reality that forces lower class Palestinians to find work elsewhere in the first place, and she believes that this issue must be faced and taken seriously for change to be possible.

The novel has also received positive reviews. Fadia Faqir, writing for Third World Quarterly, has praised the novel for its realistic portrayal of life in the West Bank which evoke emotion in the reader. Faqir believes that Khalifeh achieves this by her inclusion of details and events like Israel's demolition of Palestinian homes and the community's reaction to it. In an article for Modern Language Quarterly, Bashir Abu Manneh also praises Khalifeh for being critical of the politics of the Palestinian struggle and argues that her novel is aiming towards emancipation via working-class solidarity and truth.
