= Christopher Tingley =

English academic and translator

Christopher Tingley is an English academic and translator of Arabic literature. He was born in Brighton and read English at the University of London (MPhil 1973) and at Leeds University, for many years lecturing in English and linguistics at various African universities: the University of Constantine (Algeria); the National University of Rwanda; and the University of Ouagadougou (Burkina Faso).

Tingley is noted as a translator of classic and modern Arabic literature. He has helped to translate book-length works by writers such as Zayd Mutee Dammaj, Ibrahim al-Koni, Yahya Yakhlif and Yusuf al-Qa'id. His frequent collaborators include Salma Khadra Jayyusi, May Jayyusi and Dina Bosio. He has served as style editor of PROTA, the Project of Translation from Arabic established by Khadra Jayyusi in 1980. He has also contributed to numerous anthologies of Arabic literature in English, many of them published by PROTA.

== Book-length translations ==
- A Balcony Over the Fakihani: Three Novellas by Liyana Badr (co-translator: Peter Clark)
- A Lake Beyond the Wind by Yahya Yakhlif (co-translator: May Jayyusi)
- A Woman of Five Seasons by Leila al-Atrash (co-translator: Nora Nweihid Halwani)
- Abu Jmeel's Daughter & Other Stories: Arab Folk Tales from Palestine and Lebanon (narrator: Jamal Sleem Nuweihed)
- Homes of the Heart: A Ramallah Chronicle by Farouq Wadi (co-translator: Dina Bosio)
- Tales of Juha: Classic Arab Folk Humor (co-translators: Matthew Sorenson, Faisal Khadra)
- The Bleeding of the Stone by Ibrahim Al-Koni (co-translator: May Jayyusi)
- The Hostage by Zayd Mutee' Dammaj (co-translator: May Jayyusi)
- The Tree and Other Stories by Abdallah Al-Nasser (co-translator: Dina Bosio)
- War in the Land of Egypt (1974) by Yusuf al-Qa'id (co-translators: Olive Kenny, Lorne Kenny) (first English edition in 2004)

== Also contributed to ==
- Beyond the Dunes: an anthology of modern Saudi literature (editors: Salma Khadra Jayyusi et al.)
- Classical Arabic Stories: an anthology (editor: Salma Khadra Jayyusi)
- Short Arabic Plays: an anthology (editor: Salma Khadra Jayyusi)
- The Anchor Book of Modern Arabic Fiction (editor: Denys Johnson-Davies)
- The Adventures of Sayf Ben Dhi Yazan: an Arab folk epic (translator: Lena Jayyusi)
- Trends and Movements in Modern Arabic Poetry by Salma Khadra Jayyusi

== See also ==
- List of Arabic-English translators
