= Sail and Storm =

Novel by Hanna Mina

Sail and storm
- Author: Hanna Mina
- Language: Arabic
- Genre: Novel
- Pages: 368 pages

Sail and Storm is a novel written by Syrian writer Hanna Mina published by The House of Literature (Dar- Al-Adab). It was listed as one of the 100 Best Arabic Novels by the Arab Writers Union, notably in 14th place. The novel was translated into Russian by Vladimir Shagal.

== Plot ==
Sail and Storm is the story of a coastal Syrian city during WWII, in which the author depicted the impact of the war and the storms it left in a country occupied by the French, highlighting the contradictions that preyed on a heterogeneous society, but first and foremost, the story of seamen, the story of victory over nature, and the story of human will and adventure. The sea is not addressed in the Arabic novel without mentioning Hanna Minh, as if they are twins, which in fact they are, emanating from the Syrian coast's womb to crystallize eternal literature together through time.

== Film ==
The director Ghassan Shmeit wrote and directed the screenplay, which was co-produced by the State Foundation for Film Production and the Cannes Film and Television Production Festival.
