= The Hostage (novel) =

Book by Zayd Mutee' Dammaj

- The Hostage (1994 English language edition)
- Author: Zayd Mutee' Dammaj
- Original title: الرهينة
- Translator: May Jayyusi and Christopher Tingley
- Language: Arabic
- Genre: Novel
- Publisher: Interlink (Eng. trans.)
- Publication date: 1984
- Publication place: Yemen
- English publication date: 1994

Al-Rahinah or The Hostage is a 1984 novel by Yemeni writer Zayd Mutee' Dammaj. It was selected by the Arab Writers Union as one of the 100 best Arabic novels of the 20th century. The novel has been translated into French, English (by May Jayyusi and Christopher Tingley), German, Russian and Hindi, and is regarded as among the most famous Yemeni novels.

The Hostage has been described as "portray[ing] the domestic space in the Yemeni pre-revolutionary era and its attendant issues of suffering, suppression, hegemony, dictatorship and oppression of an autocratic ruling family."

The novel is written in a straightforward, narrative style. It is indirectly critical of Yemen's political situation at the time, namely the absolutist, arbitrary form of governance, corruption, and lack of development during the reign of Imam Yahya. Dammaj's father was a prominent critic of Imam Yahya and his son and successor, Imam Ahmad; and a founder of the Free Yemeni Party, a liberal opposition movement mentioned several times in the book.

== Plot ==
The novel is set in Taiz, the former capital of Yemen, in 1948. The narrator and protagonist is an adolescent boy from the countryside whose name is never revealed. He is taken from his parents and kept as a long-term hostage to ensure his family's political loyalty to the Imam, a common practice at the time in Yemen (in his memoirs, Dammaj recalls visiting a cousin of his who was held as a hostage at Al-Qahira Castle). After initially being kept in Al-Qahira Castle, he is soon transferred to the governor's palace, where he is trained to be a "duwaydar," a bright young man tasked with serving in the palace. He becomes close friends with the only other duwaydar in the palace, who is known only as "the handsome duwaydar" and suffers from tuberculosis.

The protagonist is assigned to serve Sharifa Hafsa, a beautiful, divorced noblewoman who is the governor's sister. His tasks at the palace include relaying letters to and from Sharifa Hafsa and a court poet, accompanying the ladies of the palace on day-trips, and preparing for social events at the palace. The duwaydars are also preyed upon sexually by the palace women, who enter their room in the night. Sharifa Hafsa becomes infatuated with the protagonist, who is obsessed with her as well but resists being under her control. She twice orders him to be put in shackles for misbehaving. Towards the end of the novel, they have a brief sexual relationship.

As the "handsome duwaydar" is dying of tuberculosis, he learns that Imam Yahya was assassinated, which briefly energizes him despite his declining condition. Soon thereafter he dies. The protagonist, Sharifa Hafsa, and others attend a small funeral for him, outside the palace walls. The protagonist tells Sharifa Hafsa that he plans on running away from the palace. Sharifa Hafsa insists that the protagonist "save her" and take her away with him, but he refuses, doubting her seriousness, and starts to run. The novel ends with her throwing stones at him as he runs away to freedom.
