= Muhammad al-Shurafi =

Yemeni poet and playwright (born 1940)

Muhammad al-Shurafi (born 1940) is a Yemeni poet and playwright. He was born in Hajja Governorate and studied at Cairo University. Subsequently he joined the Yemeni foreign service. al-Shurafi has published more than twenty books, including poetry collections (Women's Tears, To Her I Sing), plays and verse plays (In the Land of Two Edens, Seasons of Migration and Madness). His poetry is notable for its engagement with social issues, particularly that of women's rights.

al-Shurafi's poetry has been translated into English and was represented in a 1988 anthology on modern Arabian literature (edited by Salma Khadra Jayyusi).
