= Swamp Creek =

Swamp Creek may refer to:

== In Australia ==
- Swamp Creek (Comerang, Eurobodalla, New South Wales), a tributary of the Tuross River in Eurobodalla Shire
- Swamp Creek (Tuross, Eurobodalla, New South Wales), a tributary of the Tuross River in Eurobodalla Shire
- Swamp Creek (Snowy River, New South Wales), a tributary of the Eucumbene River in Snowy Monaro Regional Council
- Swamp Creek (Combienbar, East Gippsland, Victoria), a tributary of the Combienbar River in East Gippsland Shire
- Swamp Creek (Mitchell, East Gippsland, Victoria), a tributary of the Mitchell River in East Gippsland Shire

== In the United States ==
- Swamp Creek (Attapulgus Creek tributary), a stream in Florida and Georgia
- Swamp Creek (Missouri), a tributary of Frederick Creek
- Swamp Creek (Ohio), a stream in Preble County
- Swamp Creek (Pennsylvania), a tributary of Perkiomen Creek
- Swamp Creek (Washington), a tributary of the Sammamish River
- Swamp Creek (Wisconsin), a tributary of the Flambeau River
