= Swamp Thing (disambiguation) =

Swamp Thing is a DC Comics character.

Swamp Thing may also refer to:

== Uses related to the comics character ==
- Swamp Thing (comic book), several comics series
- Swamp Thing (1982 film), a 1982 film, and a sequel
- Swamp Thing (video game), a 1992 game based on the animated series
- Swamp Thing (1990 TV series), a live-action series
- Swamp Thing (1991 TV series), an animated series
- Swamp Thing (2019 TV series), a live-action series
- Swamp Thing (upcoming film), an upcoming film

== Music ==
- Swamp Thing (band), a New Zealand blues band
- Swamp Thing (album), by Malcolm McLaren, 1985
- "Swamp Thing" (song), by The Grid, 1994
- "Swamp Thing", a song by the Chameleons from Strange Times
- "Swamp Thing", a song by Juno Reactor from Bible of Dreams

== Other uses ==
- Swamp Thing (Wild Adventures), a roller coaster at Wild Adventures theme park near Valdosta, Georgia, U.S.
- Swamp Thing (DC Heroes), a 1991 supplement for the role-playing game DC Heroes
- Swamp Thing, a fictional character in the film Con Air

== See also ==
- Swamp (disambiguation)
- Swampman, a thought experiment in philosophy
- Man-Thing, a Marvel Comics character
