= The Sorrows of the Girl Mayyasa =

First edition

The Sorrows of the Girl Mayyasa (Arabic: Ahzan al-bint Mayyasa, أحزان البنت مياسة) is a short story collection by the Yemeni novelist and writer Zayd Mutee' Dammaj. It was first published in 1990 by the Ministry of Information and Culture in Yemen. It marks the final short story collection in the author's prolific literary career, following his renowned works such as Tahish al-Huban and The Scorpion.

== Stories ==
The collection comprises nine short stories that vary in theme between social realism and symbolism:

- stop on the side(قف على جنب)
- A Man on the sidewalk (رجل على الرصيف)
- The One Who Lost His Mother (الذي اضاع امه)
- The Sorrows of the Girl Mayyasa (أحزان البنت مياسة)- The title story of the collection
- The Story of the Finding (حكاية اللقية)
- The Hermit (الناسك)
- A Night (ليلة)
- The Gypsy (الغجرية)
- The Women, the Dog, and I (المرأة والكلب وانا)

== Literary Value and Style ==
The stories in this collection are characterized by their artistic and linguistic maturity, showcasing Dammaj's profound ability to capture human margins and monitor the psychological and social transformations of the Yemeni character.
