= White Ebony =

1976 collection of short stories by Syrian writer Hanna Mina

The White Ebony
- The Cover of The Novel
- Author: Hanna Mina
- Language: Arabic
- Series: 1
- Genre: Novel
- Publisher: دار الآداب، بيروت
- Publication date: 1976
- Publication place: Syria
- Pages: 271
- ISBN: 9981911259
- OCLC: 4771150159
- Website: https://www.worldcat.org/oclc/4771150159

White Ebony is a collection of short stories by the Syrian writer Hanna Mina, published in Arabic in 1976.

== Description ==
This collection of stories was first published in Syrian and Lebanese newspapers and magazines, dating back to after 1969, except for the two stories “Al-Nar” 1949, and “The Oak Ember” 1956, which Mina first published in this book.

The collection consists of ten stories:

- The White Ebony: an invitation to rebel against the routine and the connections of life and to live freely and recklessly.
- Writing on the bags Hanna depicts the difficult conditions that characterized his childhood, and how malnutrition made him a skinny boy unable to do hard physical work, and when he felt the need to help his financially destitute family, he went to the port, where he discovered his inability to lift the bags, he felt sad And when there was a need to write simple data on the bags, the "master" chose him because he was fluent in writing. It is mentioned in the story that when he met his "master" in Damascus after many years, and he was accompanied by a friend who knew both of them, that friend said to the master: Hanna is a well-known writer today, and that simple man said: Yes, I know that. I have started writing by me, on the bags!
- The Tragedy of Demetro: A psychological dialogue of a young man who fell in love and is trying to get rid of this love and the smile of his beloved, The Tragedy of Demtor (novel), which he later wrote as an independent novel.
- Recommendation card: A man in need is a slave, the story of an unemployed person and how he was subjected to humiliation at the doors of the ministers in order to find a job.
- A message from my mother: A young girl sits next to her grandmother to write a letter to her uncle, and after the beatings and insults from her grandmother, in a funny way, she begs her uncle not to appear in the newspapers and television and not to write letters to his mother, because all of that falls on her while responding.
- Tobacco pack: a journalist fleeing a coup in his country, hiding his identity from the community around him, and describing how those around him dealt with his unknown personality.
- Writer: The story of a writer who is led to the Palace of Justice to confront the judge with a simple charge, reviewing the conditions in the courts, the types of cases, treatment, and detention until the case is called.
- The Fire: When you insist on claiming your most basic rights only to improve the work environment in which you work despite its despicableness, and someone tries to withhold your right in order to provide for his employer.
- This is what is left of him: when you are a stranger and await the death of a dear, there is no brother, sister, or father by your side, when you encounter someone who speaks your language and shares your pain and loneliness, you find someone to whom you complain of your anxiety and pain.
- Oak Ember: Oaks do not extinguish, they remain burning until they completely wither away, and this is how free men are, no matter how old they are, they remain like oak embers.

== See also ==
- Blue Lanterns (novel)
