= Till We Have Built Jerusalem =

Till We Have Built Jerusalem may refer to:

- A verse from "And did those feet in ancient time", William Blake poem also known as the hymn "Jerusalem"
- "Till We Have Built Jerusalem", the 38th episode of The 4400
- Till We Have Built Jerusalem: Architects of a New City, a 2016 book by Adina Hoffman
