= Peter Cole =

American poet (born 1957)

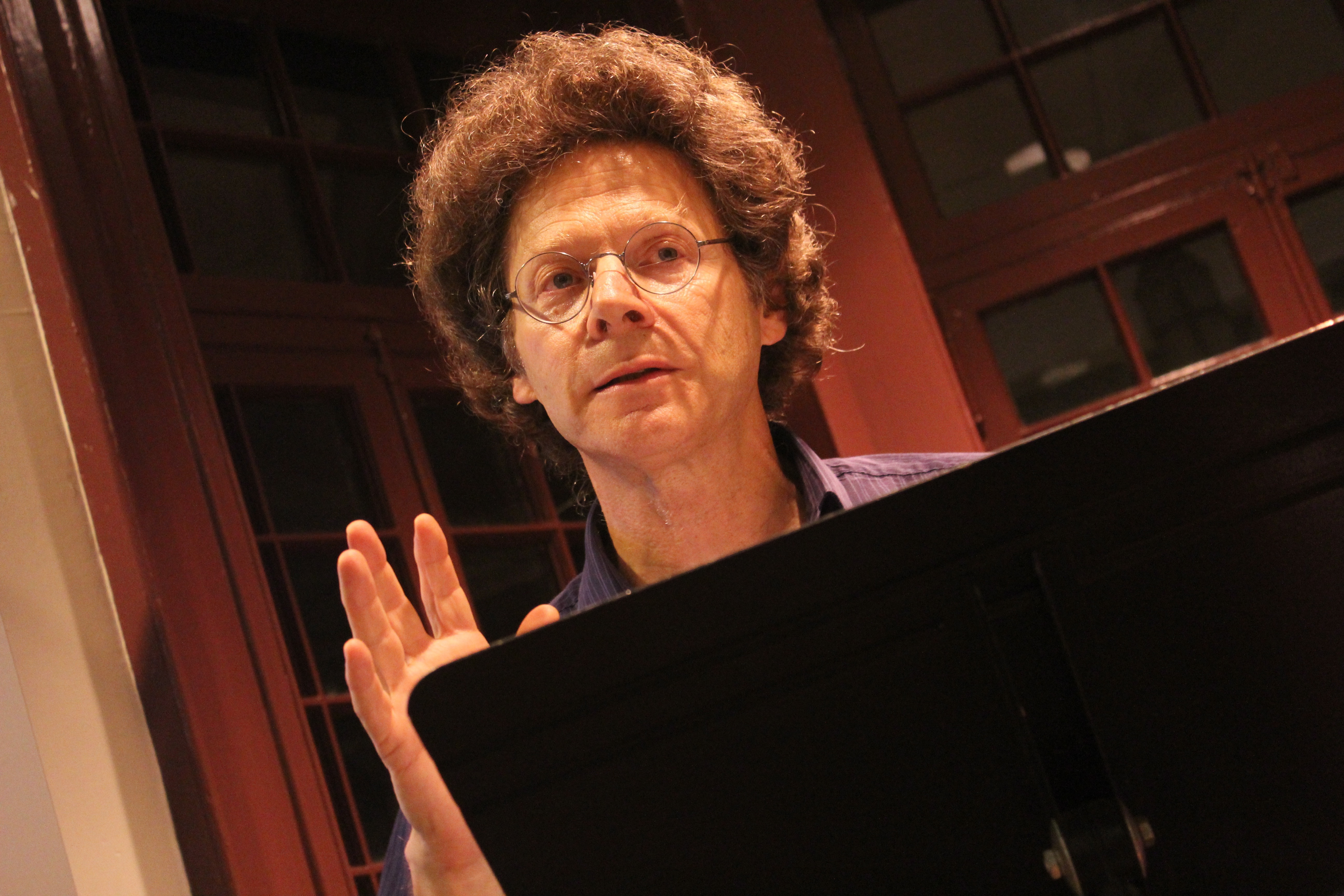
- Peter Cole speaks at Kelly Writers House in 2015.
- Born: 1957 (age 68–69); Paterson, New Jersey, U.S.
- Education: Williams College; Hampshire College
- Spouse: Adina Hoffman
- Writing career
- Genres: Poetry; Translation

Peter Cole (born 1957) is a MacArthur-winning poet and translator who lives in Jerusalem and New Haven. Cole was born in 1957 in Paterson, New Jersey. He attended Williams College and Hampshire College, and moved to Jerusalem in 1981. He has been called "one of the handful of authentic poets of his own American generation" by the critic Harold Bloom. In a 2015 interview in The Paris Review, he described his work as poet and translator as "at heart, the same activity carried out at different points along a spectrum."

== Literary career ==
In addition to its focus on what he calls "deep translation," Cole's work as both a poet and a translator reflects a sustained engagement with the cultures of Judaism and especially of the Middle East. He is, Eliot Weinberger has written, "an urban poet whose city is Jerusalem; a classicist whose Antiquity is medieval Hebrew; a sensualist whose objects of delight are Mediterranean; an avant-gardist whose forms are the meditation, the song, the jeremiad, the proverb." The American Poet noted that "prosodic mastery fuses with a keen moral intelligence" in Cole's work, which the reviewer says is distinctive for its unfashionable engagement with wisdom and beauty. Writing in Bomb magazine, poet and novelist Ben Lerner observed that Cole's poetry is "remarkable for its combination of intellectual rigor with delight in surface, for how its prosody returns each abstraction to the body, linking thought and breath, metaphysics and musicality. Religious, erotic, elegiac, pissed off--the affective range is wide and the forms restless."

Cole's first book of poems, Rift, was published in 1989 by Station Hill Press. His subsequent volumes of poetry include What is Doubled: Poems 1981-1998 (Shearsman, UK), Things on Which I've Stumbled (New Directions, 2008), and The Invention of Influence (New Directions, 2014), which was a finalist for the Poetry Society of America's William Carlos Williams Award. That book included an extended dramatic poem about the maverick Vienna psychoanalyst Victor Tausk and his notion of "the influence machine." In a 2013 interview with Bookslut, Cole talked about the poem as "a case history of susceptibility" and about the influence machine as a figure for literary tradition: "We're always being manipulated by forces outside us -- familial, fraternal, sexual, social, and literary presences that have brought us to a given moment or scene of 'translation,' or expression. And then we're taken over, as it were, or even possessed by the various presences that enter our lives, for better and worse -- consciously and unconsciously. We're inhabited. These presences live on in us and in some cases become ingrained in us, as habit. And these habits in turn draw other presences to and through us. As poets, as makers, even as readers, whenever we're in the space of the poem, we're constantly in the process of being made and being had -- in all senses of the term, positive and negative. There's something marvelous and exhilarating about this, but also terrifying. One's made greater, clearly, but also runs the risk of ceasing to be one self, which is to say, oneself."

In 2017, Farrar, Straus and Giroux published his Hymns & Qualms: New and Selected Poems and Translations, which The Paris Review Daily called “a wise and radiant collection,” saying it “cannot be recommended strongly enough.” Poet Christian Wiman, meanwhile, wrote: “I love this book—for its idiosyncratic music, its moral and spiritual intelligence, and the balance it maintains between pain and joy, provocation and solace. People are always asking what’s the point of poetry when the world is going to hell. Hymns & Qualms is a potent reply.”

Cole has also worked intensively on Hebrew literature, with special emphasis on medieval Hebrew poetry. His 2007 anthology, The Dream of the Poem: Hebrew Poetry in Muslim and Christian Spain, 950-1492 (Princeton)—recipient of the National Jewish Book Award and winner of the American Publishers Association's award for Book of the Year—traces the arc of the entire period. Poet and translator Richard Howard described Cole's work as "an entire revelation: a body of lyric and didactic verse so intense, so intelligent, and so vivid that it appears to identify a whole dimension of historical consciousness previously unavailable to us." The New York Times Book Review wrote that "his versions are masterly."

Cole has also published highly praised translations of contemporary Hebrew and Arabic poetry and fiction by Aharon Shabtai, Yoel Hoffmann, Taha Muhammad Ali, Avraham Ben-Yitzhak, and others. Cole describes his approach to translation in an essay, "Making Sense in Translation," and in several interviews—in The Paris Review and Readysteadybooks.

Sacred Trash: The Lost and Found World of the Cairo Geniza, a nonfiction book wrote with his wife, Adina Hoffman, was published in 2011 by Schocken Books and tells the story of the recovery from a Cairo geniza (or repository for worn-out texts) of the most vital cache of Hebrew manuscripts ever discovered. A review in The Nation characterized it as a "literary jewel whose pages turn like those of a well-paced thriller, but with all the chiseled elegance and flashes of linguistic surprise that we associate with poetry."

Cole, who has been a visiting artist at Wesleyan University, and Middlebury College, currently teaches one semester a year at Yale University.

=== Bibliography ===
==== Poetry ====
- Rift (1989)
- Hymns & Qualms (1997)
- What is Doubled: Poems 1981-1998 (2005)
- Things on Which I've Stumbled (2008)
- The Invention of Influence (2014)
- Hymns & Qualms: New and Selected Poems and Translations (2017)
- On Being Drawn: An Ekphrastic Translation (with Commentary), with Terry Winters (2019)
- Draw Me After (2022)

==== Translation & Editing ====
- Shmuel HaNagid, Selected Poems of Shmuel HaNagid (1996)
- Harold Schimmel, Qasida (1997)
- Harold Schimmel, From Island to Island (1997)
- Aharon Shabtai, Love & Selected Poems (1998)
- Solomon Ibn Gabirol, Selected Poems of Solomon Ibn Gabirol (2001)
- Avraham Ben Yitzhak, Collected Poems, Hannan Hever, ed. (2002)
- Aharon Shabtai, J’accuse (2003)
- Yoel Hoffman, The Shunra and the Schmetterling (2004)
- Taha Muhammad Ali, So What: New & Selected Poems, 1971-2005, with Yahya Hijazi and Gabriel Levin (2006)
- Yoel Hoffman, The Heart is Katmandu (2006)
- The Dream of the Poem: Hebrew Poetry from Muslim and Christian Spain, 950–1492 (2007)
- Hebrew Writers on Writing (2008)
- Yoel Hoffmann, Curriculum Vitae (2009)
- Aharon Shabtai, War & Love, Love & War: New and Selected Poems (2011)
- The Poetry of the Kabbalah: Mystical Verse from the Jewish Tradition (2012)
- Yoel Hoffmann, Moods (2015)

==== Nonfiction ====
- Sacred Trash: The Lost and Found World of the Cairo Geniza, with Adina Hoffman (2011)

== Personal life ==
He is married to Adina Hoffman, an essayist and biographer.

== Honors and awards ==
- 2012 John Frederick Nims Prize (Poetry Magazine)
- 2010 American Academy of Arts and Letters Award in Literature
- 2007 MacArthur Fellows Program
- 2007 National Jewish Book Award in Poetry for The Dream of the Poem
- National Endowment for the Arts Fellowship
- NEH Fellowship
- 2004 PEN Translation Fund Grant from PEN American Center
- 2004 PEN Award for Poetry in Translation
- 2002 Guggenheim Fellow
- TLS Translation Prize
- MLA's Scaglione Prize for Translation
- Hawkins Prize for Book of the Year from the Association of American Publishers' Professional and Scholarly Publishing Division
- G.E. Younger Writers' Award.
