= PROTA =

PROTA can refer to:

- Plant Resources of Tropical Africa
- Project for the Translation of Arabic
- prota, Protopope
