= Leaving at Dusk =

Novel by Hanna Mina

- Author: Hanna Mina
- Original title: الرحيل عند الغروب
- Language: Arabic
- Genre: Novel
- Publisher: Dar Al Adab for Publishing and Distribution
- Publication date: 1992
- Publication place: Lebanon
- Pages: 299 pp (paperback)
- ISBN: 9789953893396
- Preceded by: –

Leaving at Dusk (Arabic: الرحيل عند الغروب) is a novel by the Syrian author Hanna Mina, published by Dar Al-Adab for Publishing and Distribution in 1992.

The novel tells the story of an elderly, wealthy sailor who spent his life at sea, rejecting law and authority, and indifferent to death or madness. One night, he decides to dive in search of the mermaid he believes in, philosophizing and embracing life without a clear purpose.

== See also ==
- The End of a Brave Man
