= Liana Badr =

Palestinian novelist and short story writer

Liana Badr ليانة بدر
- Born: Jericho
- Education: M.A from Birzeit University. B.A in Philosophy and Psychology from Beirut Arab University.
- Alma mater: Birzeit University and Beirut Arab University

Liana Badr (Arabic: ليانة بدر; born 1950 in Jerusalem) is a Palestinian novelist, and short story writer.

== Life ==
Badr is a novelist, story writer, journalist, poet and cinema director. She was raised in Jericho. She studied at the University of Jordan and graduated from the Beirut Arab University in Lebanon with a BA in philosophy and psychology. Badr studied at the Lebanese University. She earned her M.A. from Birzeit University. She lived in Beirut and worked as an editor for Al Hurriyya.

After 1982, she moved to Damascus, Syria, then Tunis, Tunisia, and Amman, Jordan. She returned to Palestine in 1994.

She worked in the Palestinian Ministry of Culture (PMC) as a general director for the Arts. She worked in the Cinematic Archive through their Audiovisual department. She was editor of Dafater Thaqafiyya.

== Interviews ==
- Interview with Liana Badr, produced by the PalREAD – Country of Words project, funded by the European Research Council (ERC)
- حوار مع الكاتبة والشاعرة والمخرجة ليانة بدر، انتاج مشروع ممول من البحث العلمي الاوروبي

== Works ==
- بوصلة من أجل عباد الشمس: رواية ؛ شرفة على الفاكهاني : قصص (Compass of the Sunflower) دار الثقافة الجديدة, 1989
- جحيم ذهبي: قصص (Hell of Gold: stories), دار الاداب،, 1991
- نجوم أريحا (Jericho Stars), دار الهلال،,1993
- زنابق الضوء (Lilies light) 1998 دار شرقيات للنشر واالتوزيع,
- سماء واحدة (One Sky) 2007

=== Works in English ===
- A compass for the sunflower, Women's Press, 1989, ISBN 978-0-7043-5037-3
- A Balcony over the Fakihani. Translated by Peter Clark; Christopher Tingley. Interlink Books. 1993. ISBN 978-1-56656-464-9.
- The Stars of Jericho, 1993
- The Eye of the Mirror, Translator Samira Kawar, Garner, 1994, ISBN 978-1-85964-020-3; Garnet, 2008, ISBN 978-1-85964-201-6

=== Anthologies ===
- Salma Khadra Jayyusi, ed. (2005). "Colors". Modern Arabic fiction: an anthology. Columbia University Press. ISBN 978-0-231-13254-1.
- Denys Johnson-Davies, ed. (2006). "from The Land of Stone and Thyme". The Anchor book of modern Arabic fiction. Random House Digital, Inc. ISBN 978-1-4000-7976-6.
- "March of the Dinosaurs". Freedom: Stories Celebrating the Universal Declaration of Human Rights. Random House Digital, Inc. 2011. ISBN 978-0-307-58883-8.

=== Articles ===
- Badr, Liana. 2023. The Memories of a Photographic Lens. Journal of Palestine Studies 133, 209-219.
- Badr, Liana. 2020. Why Do They Not Accept Beirut to Be Beirut? Journal of Palestine Studies 124, 187-189.

== Filmography ==
- Fadwa: A Tale of a Palestinian Poetess. 52 min, 1999.
- Zeitounat. 37 min, 2000.
- The Green Bird. 37 min, 2002.
- Siege (A Writer's Diary). 33 min. 2003
- The Gates are Open. Sometimes! 2006. 42 min.
- A match on Thursday Afternoon. 2006. 3 min.
- Al QUds – My City. 2010. 52 min

== Sources ==
- Brinda J. Mehta (2007). "Palestinian Women and the Problematics of Survival". Rituals of memory: in contemporary Arab women's writing. Syracuse University Press. ISBN 978-0-8156-3135-4.
- Lisa Suhair Majaj; Paula W. Sunderman; Therese Saliba, eds. (2002). Intersections: gender, nation, and community in Arab women's novels. Syracuse University Press. ISBN 978-0-8156-2951-1.
