= Sahar Khalifeh =

Palestinian writer (born 1941)

- سحر خليفة
- Born: 1941 (age 83–84); Nablus, British Mandate for Palestine
- Occupation(s): writer, novelist, feminist
- Awards: Naguib Mahfouz Medal for Literature

Sahar Khalifeh (Arabic: سحر خليفة; born 1941) is a Palestinian writer. She has written eleven novels, which have been translated into English, French, Hebrew, German, Spanish, and many other languages. One of her best-known works is the novel Wild Thorns (1976). She has won international prizes, including the 2006 Naguib Mahfouz Medal for Literature, for The Image, the Icon, and the Covenant. Khalifeh obtained her Bachelor of Arts degree in English from Birzeit University, Palestine.

== Biography ==
Sahar Khalifeh was born in Nablus, British Mandate Palestine, the fifth of eight daughters. Khalifeh reflects “I learned that I was a member of a miserable, useless, worthless sex. From childhood, I was taught to prepare myself for the risks associated with being a woman.”

In childhood, Khalifeh found creative outlets like reading, writing, and painting. She was married off against her will shortly after finishing high school in Amman, Jordan. She describes her 13-year marriage as “miserable and devastating” and did not write during this period. She once again found refuge in books: “I indulged, just like anybody else in the educated Arab world, in the existentialist movement and existential intellectualism. Until the Occupation took place, I continued to be an existentialist.”

After the 1967 defeat of Jordan and subsequent Israeli occupation of the West Bank, Khalifeh began writing again. She began with “resistance poetry”, inspired by the works of Mahmoud Darwish before breaking from the limited female narratives typical in resistance literature. Her first novel, After the Defeat, followed the interactions of families in a Nablus apartment building after the war. The only manuscript of this novel was confiscated by Israeli authorities and never published. Khalifeh continued writing and We Are Not Your Slaves Any Longer, was published in 1974, followed by her best-known novel, Wild Thorns, in 1976. Wild Thorns explored class nuances under Israeli occupation. She published The Sunflower in 1980 as a sequel to Wild Thorns to focus on female narratives that were largely absent from the original story. In her autobiography, A Novel for My Story, she describes beginning life as a university student at the age of thirty-two alongside two other friends from Nablus.

She continued her education in the U.S., receiving a Fulbright scholarship to complete her MA in English from the University of North Carolina Chapel Hill. She received her Ph.D. in Women's studies and American literature from the University of Iowa. She returned to Nablus in 1988 after the start of the first intifada and began writing Bab al-Saha (Passage to the Plaza), a novel depicting women's lives against the background of the Intifada. In 1988, Khalifeh also founded the Women's Affairs Center in Nablus. She describes her work with women in Nablus in an interview with Penny Johnson “I didn't bring an image of an institution from abroad. I learned from ‘reality.’” Khalifeh has since opened Women’s Affairs Center branches in Gaza City, West Bank, and Amman, Jordan.

Khalifeh has continued writing, one of her recent publications أصلٌ وفصل (Root and Branch) was published in 2009 by Dar al-Adeb and translated into English as Of Noble Origins in 2012. This novel, set on the eve of the Nakba of 1948 & the state of Israel’s establishment, explores the stories of characters confronting the British Mandate and the Zionist movement. Khalifeh’s most recent publication of 2010 My First and Only Love follows the story of a Palestinian woman who, after many years in exile, returns home to Nablus. This novel was published in English by Hoopoe in March 2021. Khalifeh has published eleven novels, all of which deal with the situation of the Palestinians under occupation.

== Selected works ==
=== Publications by Khalifeh ===
The following novels are available in translation into English:

- Wild Thorns. Interlink. 2000. OCLC 42581514.
- The Inheritance. Translated by Bamia, Aida A. American University in Cairo Press. 2005. OCLC 62887830.
- The End of Spring. Translated by Haydar, Paula. Interlink. 2008. OCLC 154799504.
- The Image, the Icon and the Covenant. Translated by Bamia, Aida A. Interlink. 2008. OCLC 147985601.
- Of Noble Origins. Translated by Bamia, Aida A. American University in Cairo Press. 2012. OCLC 748331417.
- Passage to the Plaza. Translated by Hussain, Sawad. Seagull Books. 2020. OCLC 1139137431.
- My First and Only Love. Translated by Bamia, Aida A. Hoopoe. 2021. OCLC 1250276496.

Other novels not translated into English:

- Lam na’ud ghawārī lakum لم نعد جواري لكم [We Are not Your Slave Girls Anymore]. Dar al-Adab. 1974.
- Abbad al-Shams عباد الشمس [The Sunflower]. Dar al-Adab. 1980.
- Mudhakkirāt imra’ah ghayr wāqi’īyah مذكرات امرأة غير واقعية [Memoirs of an Unrealistic Woman]. Dar al-Adab. 1986.
- Rabi’ Harr ربيع حار [Hot Spring]. Dar al-Adab. 2004.

=== Publications with contributions by Khalifeh ===
- Anthology of Modern Palestinian Literature by Salma Jayyusi (Columbia University Press), contains excerpts of her earlier work

== Awards ==
- 2006: Naguib Mahfouz Medal for Literature for The Image, the Icon, and the Covenant.
- 2013: The Mohamed Zafzaf Prize, Morocco
