= Laila al-Atrash =

Jordanian writer and journalist (1948–2021)

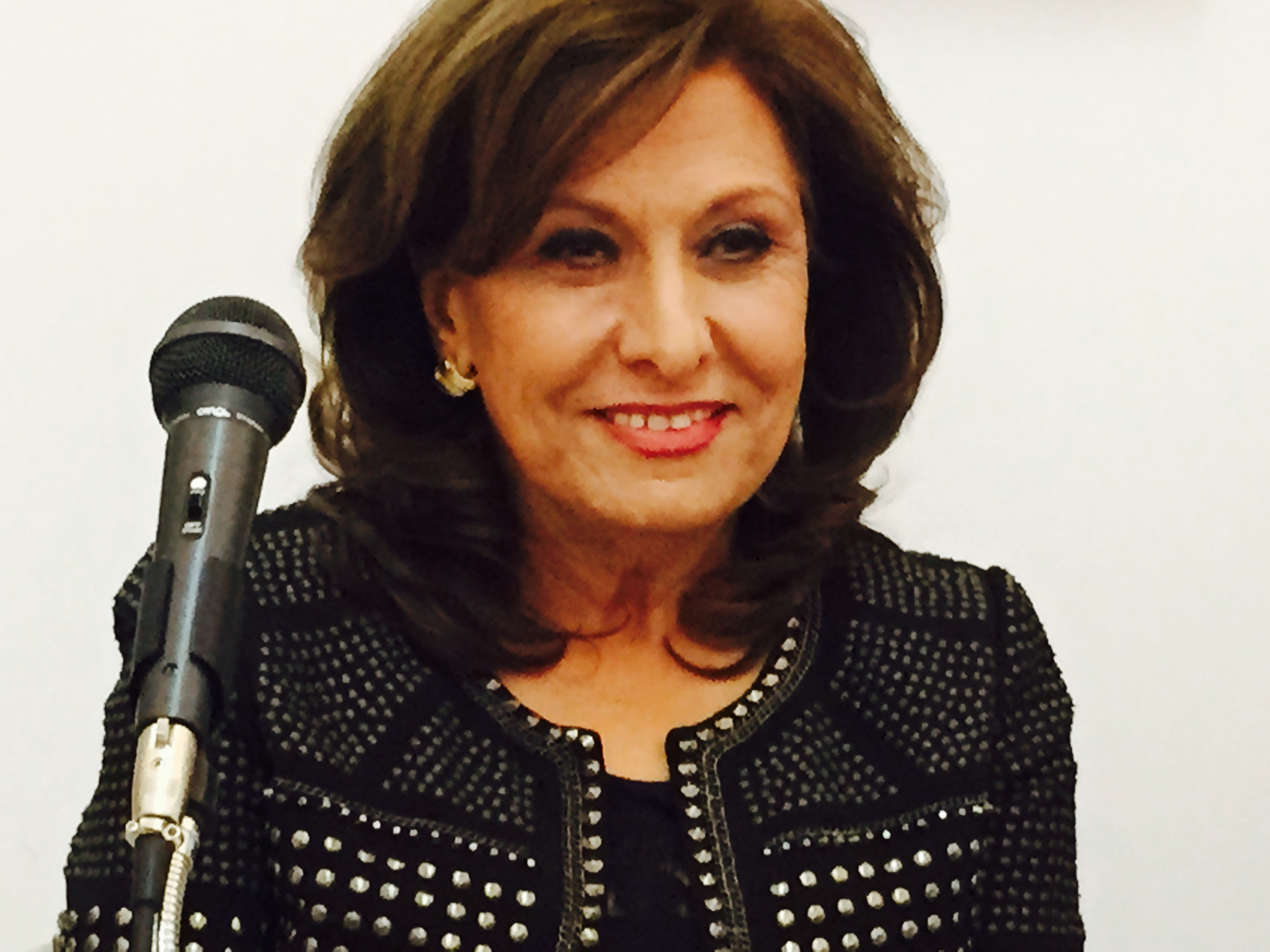
Image of Laila

Laila al-Atrash (Arabic: ليلى الأطرش; died 17 October 2021) was a Palestinian and Jordanian writer and journalist. She was the author of half a dozen novels, one of which (A Woman of Five Seasons) was translated into English by Nura Nuwayhid Halwani and Christopher Tingley. Atrash was also noted for her journalism, especially her documentaries on leading figures of Arabic culture. She served as the President of PEN Jordan.

She started her media career as a journalist and press reporter, then as producer and presenter of radio programs. In the seventies she entered the broadcasting field as a TV news editor, anchor and program producer. Her TV programs covered a range of cultural and social themes. Notable in her TV production was a series of investigative and in-depth programs and interviews with a host of Arab intellectuals, writers and artists, as well as with other symbols of modern Arab culture in various fields.

Laila al-Atrash, held a degree in Arabic literature, a degree in law and a Diploma in French. Her published works include: “Sunrise from the West” (a novel, 1988); “A Woman of Five Seasons” (a novel, 1990); “A Day Like Any Other” (a collection of short stories, 1991); “Two Nights and the Shadow of a Woman” (a novel, 1997); “The Neighing of Distances” (a novel, 1999); “Illusive Anchors” (a novel, 2005); and "Women at Crossroads" (travel memoirs 2009), "Desires of that Autumn" (a novel, 2010).

Her last novel Hymns of Temptation was nominated for the 2016 Arabic Booker Prize.
