= The Bridge (short story collection) =

The Bridge or Al-Jisr is a short story collection by Yemeni writer Zayd Mutee' Dammaj. It was first published in 1986.
