= Taha Muhammad Ali =

Palestinian poet born in Saffuriyya, Galilee

- طه محمد علي
- Born: 1931; Saffuriyya, Galilee
- Died: October 2, 2011 (aged 79–80); Nazareth
- Occupation: Poet

Taha Muhammad Ali (Arabic: طه محمد علي; 1931 in Saffuriyya, Galilee – October 2, 2011 in Nazareth) was a Palestinian poet.

== Biography ==
Ali fled to Lebanon with his family when he was 17 after their village came under heavy bombardment during the 1948 Arab-Israeli War. The following year, he returned to Nazareth, where he lived until his death. In the 1950s and 1960s, he sold souvenirs during the day to Christian pilgrims and studied poetry at night. His formal education ended after fourth grade. He was owner of a small souvenir shop near the Church of the Annunciation which he operated with his sons, Muhammad Ali wrote vividly of his childhood in Saffuriyya and the political upheavals he survived.

== Publications ==
A collection of his work in English translation (with facing Arabic), So What: New & Selected Poems, 1971–2005, translated by Peter Cole, Yahya Hijazi, and Gabriel Levin, was published by Copper Canyon Press in 2006. A British edition of the same book appeared with Bloodaxe Books. German and French translations are underway. He has given numerous readings with Cole in the US and Europe. Muhammad Ali is the subject of a biography published by Yale University Press, My Happiness Bears No Relation to Happiness: A Poet's Life in the Palestinian Century by Adina Hoffman. The Palestinian-Israeli novelist Anton Shammas has translated a collection of Taha Muhammad Ali's work into Hebrew.

== Poetic style ==
Muhammad Ali's style has been described in the introduction to his English collection as "forceful" and written "in short lines of varying beats with a minimum of fuss and a rich array of images drawn primarily from his village life."

In a review of So What: New & Selected Poems, he is described as a "beguiling story-teller who maintains a tone of credibility and lucidity without diluting the mysterious or distressing aspects of his tale...By avoiding commonplace response to everyday experience he has written poems that are fragile and graceful and fresh." Another reviewer described his poems as "a rich amalgam of sorrow, desolation, and hope."

== Other ==
Amer Hlehel wrote and performs a monodrama, “Taha”, commemorating Taha Muhammad Ali's life and poetry, and particularly the latter's experience of the nakba. The English-language premiere was performed on the 16 of March 2017 at the Kennedy Center for the Performing Arts in Washington DC.

== Published work ==
- So What: New & Selected Poems, 1971–2005. Translated by Cole, Peter; Hijazi, Yahya & Levin, Gabriel. 2006. ISBN 1-55659-245-0.
- Never Mind: Twenty Poems and a Story. Translated by Cole, Peter; Hijazi, Yahya & Levin, Gabriel. 2000. ISBN 965-90125-2-7.
- حريق في مقبرة الدير. الطيبة [Fire in the Convent Garden]. 1992.
- ضحك على ذقون القتلة [Fooling the Killers]. 1989.
- القصيدة الرابعة [The Fourth Qasida]. 1983.

=== Anthologies ===
- Hirsch, Edward (2006). Poet's Choice. ISBN 0-15-101356-X.

== See also ==
- Autodidacticism
