= The Scorpion (novel) =

- Author: Zayd Mutee' Dammaj
- Original title: Al-Aqrab(العقرب)
- Language: Arabic
- Publisher: Dar Al-Awda
- Publication date: 1982
- Pages: 143

The Scorpion or Al-'Aqrab is a collection of short stories by the Yemeni writer and novelist Zayd Mutee' Dammaj. First published in 1982 by Dar Al-Awda in Beirut. This collection is considered a major milestone in Dammaj`s short story career, representing an extension of his critical realism in observing the intricate details of Yemeni society, as well as its political and social transformations, through condensed and symbolic narrative forms.

== Collection Content ==
The collection includes several short stories that address the concerns and contemporary issues of Yemeni society, most notably:

- The Scorpion (Al-Aqrab): The title story of the collection, characterized by its high symbolism, projects the traits of a scorpion onto certain social phenomena or authoritarian figures.
- The Mule's Rebellion (Thawrat Baghlah): A satirical story reflecting themes of rebellion and rejection within a rural or traditional environment.
- Heil Hitler: Discusses behavioral traits and ideas through a narrative style that connects individual actions to society at large.
- A Managing Girl (Fatat Mudabbirah).
- Al-Dhahiri.
- The Journey (Al-Rihlah): Highlights the theme of travel and alienation(expatriation), a common motif in Yemeni literature due to the country's history of migration.
- Life(Al-Hayat).
- The First of the Suicides (Awwal Al-Muntahireen).
