= Yoel Hoffmann =

Israeli writer (1937–2023)

Yoel Hoffmann (Hebrew: יואל הופמן; 23 June 1937 – 25 August 2023) was an Israeli Jewish contemporary author, editor, scholar and translator. Held a title of a professor of Japanese poetry, Buddhism, and philosophy at the University of Haifa in Israel and lived in Galilee.

== Biography ==
Born in Braşov, Romania to Jewish parents of Austro-Hungarian culture, at the age of one Hoffmann and his parents fled a Europe increasingly under Nazi influence for the British Mandate of Palestine. Shortly after the move, Hoffmann's mother died and he was entrusted by his father to an orphanage where he spent his time until his father remarried.

As a young man, Hoffmann left his home in Israel and traveled to Japan, where he spent two years living in a Zen monastery and studying Chinese and Japanese texts with monks. He would later return to Japan to earn his doctorate. Hoffmann did not begin writing fiction until in his forties, and though chronologically a member of the sixties "Generation of the State," his work is oft-described as being on the forefront of avant-garde Hebrew literature, with an influence of his Japanese studies discernible in his works.

Hoffmann's first book of fiction, Kätzchen - The Book of Joseph, was published in Hebrew in 1988. He went on to write ten more books in Hebrew, seven of which have been translated into English and published by New Directions; these include Katschen and The Book of Joseph (1998), Bernhard (1998), The Christ of Fish (1999), The Heart is Katmandu (2001), The Shunra and the Schmetterling (2004), Curriculum Vitae (2009), and Moods (2015). Hoffmann was awarded the inaugural Koret Jewish Book Award, as well as the Bialik Prize by the city of Tel Aviv and the Prime Minister's Prize.

The rights to Hoffmann's latest book, Moods, were sold to Galaade publishing company in France and to Keter Books in Israel in 2010.

Yoel Hoffmann died on 25 August 2023, at the age of 86.

== Selected bibliography ==
=== Writings by the author ===
- Katschen and The Book of Joseph, trans. from Hebrew by Eddie Levenston, David Kriss, and Alan Treister, New Directions (New York, NY) 1998.
- Bernhard, trans. from Hebrew by Alan Treister & Eddie Levenston, New Directions (New York, NY), 1998.
- The Christ of Fish, trans. from Hebrew by Eddie Levenston, New Directions (New York, NY), 1999.
- The Heart is Katmandu, trans. from Hebrew by Peter Cole, New Directions (New York, NY), 2001.
- The Shunra and the Schmetterling, trans. from Hebrew by Peter Cole, New Directions (New York, NY), 2004.
- Curriculum Vitae, trans. from Hebrew by Peter Cole, New Directions (New York, NY), 2009.
- Moods, trans. from Hebrew by Peter Cole, New Directions (New York, NY), 2015.

=== Editor and translator ===
- Japanese Death Poems: Written by Zen Monks and Haiku Poets on the Verge of Death, Tuttle Publishing, 1986.
- The Sound of the One Hand: 281 Zen Koans with Answers, Basic Books, 1975.
