= Yahya Yakhlif =

Palestinian politician and writer (born 1944)

- يحيى يخلف

Minister of Culture
- In office 12 November 2003 – 29 March 2006
- Prime Minister: Ahmed Qurei; Nabil Shaath (acting); Ahmed Qurei
- Preceded by: Nabil Shaath
- Succeeded by: Attallah Abul Sabeh

Personal details
- Born: Yahya Hassan Abdullah Yakhlif; 11 November 1944 (age 81) Samakh, Palestine
- Party: Independent
- Education: Beirut Arab University
- Occupation: Politician, writer, novelist, journalist

Yahya Yakhlif (Arabic: يحيى يخلف; born 11 November 1944) is a Palestinian politician, writer, novelist and journalist. He was born in Samakh, a Palestinian village that was abandoned during the 1948 Palestinian expulsion and flight, when Yakhlif was 4 years old. Consequently, Yakhlif and his family became displaced refugees.

As an author and novelist, Yakhlif has published several novels and short story collections. His novel about the last days of Samakh, A Lake Beyond the Wind, was translated into English by Christopher Tingley and May Jayyusi and published by Interlink Books in 1998 in its Emerging Voices series. Ma' Al Sama, a more recent novel, also explores the condition of Palestinian exile. Ma' Al Sama was nominated for the 2009 Arabic Booker Prize.

Political offices
Preceded by Nabil Shaath	Minister of Culture; 2003–2006	Succeeded by Attallah Abul Sabeh
