= Swamp Creek (Attapulgus Creek tributary) =

Stream in Florida and Georgia, U.S.

Coordinates: 30°38′16.70″N 84°28′1.67″W

Swamp Creek is a stream in the U.S. states of Florida and Georgia. It is a tributary to Attapulgus Creek.

Swamp Creek was named for the wetlands near its course.
