= Swamp music =

Swamp music may refer to:

- Swamp rock
- Swamp blues
- Swamp pop
- "Swamp Music", a track from the 1974 album Second Helping by Lynyrd Skynyrd
- "Swamp Music", an electronic music label and publisher based in the United States
