= La Cienega =

A ciénega is a type of wetland.

La Cienega, Ciénega, or Cienaga may also refer to:

== Places ==
=== United States ===
- La Cienega, New Mexico, a census-designated place in Santa Fe County
- La Cienega Boulevard, a major arterial road in Los Angeles County, California
  - La Cienega/Jefferson station, a station on the LA Metro E Line
  - Wilshire/La Cienega station, a station on the LA Metro D Line
- Ciénega Creek, an intermittent stream in southern Arizona
- Las Cienegas National Conservation Area, a protected area in Arizona
- Río de la Ciénaga, a river in Puerto Rico
- Ciénaga, Guánica, Puerto Rico, a barrio

=== Dominican Republic ===
- La Ciénaga, Barahona, a town in Barahona, Dominican Republic
- La Ciénaga, San José de Ocoa, a town in San José de Ocoa, Dominican Republic
- La Cienega, a neighborhood in the banks of the Ozama River in Santo Domingo, Dominican Republic
- La Cienega de Manabao, Jarabacoa, Dominican Republic a small village known as the entry to José Armando Bermúdez National Park.

=== Colombia ===
- Ciénega, Boyacá, a municipality in Boyacá Department
- Ciénaga, Magdalena, a municipality and a town in Magdalena Department
- Ciénaga de Oro, a municipality and town in Córdoba Department

== Other uses ==
- La Ciénaga (film), a 2001 Argentine, Spanish, and French film
- La Ciénega Formation, a geologic formation in Mexico
- La Ciénega Formation, Bolivia
