= Saraya, the Ogre's Daughter =

1991 Arabic novel by Emile Habibi

Saraya, the Ogre's Daughter: A Palestinian Fairy Tale (Arabic: سرايا بنت الغول, Sarāyā Bint al-Ghūl) is a 1991 Arabic language novel by Emile Habibi. It was translated by Peter Theroux, with the English translation published by Ibis Editions. It is the last novel by Habibi.

== Background and release ==
Habibi wrote the book in 1990, and it was published in 1991.

Arabesque Publishing House (Hebrew: ערבסק הוצאה לאור בע"מ) in Haifa published the original Arabic version. Anton Shammas made a Hebrew translation (Hebrew: סראיא בת השד הרע), and it was published in 1993 by the publishing house of the HaKibbutz HaMeuhad.

The French version was translated by Jean-Patrick Gillaume and published by Éditions Gallimard on 3 May 1996.

The English version was published in 2006, after Habibi's death. It was translated by Peter Theroux, with the English translation published by Ibis Editions.

== Plot ==
Jacob Norris of the University of Sussex described the book as "a series of fairy tales whose plot structures serve as commentaries on the modern Palestinian predicament." The main character, described by Publishers Weekly as "Habiby's alter ego", tries to find the identity of a ghost in the form of a girl who is trying to catch fish. The plot starts in 1983, and the form had prevented the main character from dying. The man calls the form "Saraya" after a character in a fairy tale and a girl he knew growing up.

== Reception ==
Publishers Weekly stated that the English translation was at an "expert" level.

Christine Thomas, writing in the Chicago Tribune, described the book as "an earnest homage to the ways imagination, proverbs and legends help us discern the truth".

Tahar Ben Jelloun of Le Monde gave a positive review to the French version, stating that it was more than a "simple translation" ("au-delà de la simple traduction").
