= Adina Hoffman =

American journalist (born 1967)

Adina Hoffman (born 1967) is an American writer whose work blends literary and documentary elements. Her books concern, among other things, the "lives and afterlives of people, movies, islands, books, and certain city streets."

== Biography ==
Born in Jackson, Mississippi in 1967, Hoffman grew up in Peterborough, New Hampshire and Houston, Texas, and graduated from Wesleyan University in 1989. She has lived in Jerusalem since 1992 and now divides her time between there and New Haven.

Her first book, House of Windows: Portraits from a Jerusalem Neighborhood (Steerforth Press, 2000, Broadway Books, 2002) consists of a series of linked essays about her North African Jewish neighborhood in Jerusalem. It was described by Kirkus Reviews as "steadily perceptive and brimming with informed passion." In 2009 Yale University Press brought out her My Happiness Bears No Relation to Happiness: A Poet's Life in the Palestinian Century, a life and times of the Palestinian poet Taha Muhammad Ali. The first biography ever published about a Palestinian writer, My Happiness was awarded Britain’s 2010 Jewish Quarterly-Wingate Prize and was named one of the best twenty books of 2009 by the Barnes & Noble Review and one of the top ten biographies of the year by Booklist. Writing in The Independent, Boyd Tonkin called it "a remarkable book… A triumph of personal empathy and historical insight and a beacon for anyone who believes that ‘more joins than separates us.’"

A 2011 Guggenheim Foundation fellow, Hoffman is married to MacArthur-winning poet and translator Peter Cole, and in 2011, she and Cole published a book they wrote together, Sacred Trash: The Lost and Found World of the Cairo Geniza (Schocken /Nextbook), which has been widely praised, with Harold Bloom calling it "a small masterpiece" and The Nation describing it as "a literary jewel whose pages turn like those of a well-paced thriller, but with all the chiseled elegance and flashes of linguistic surprise we associate with poetry... Sacred Trash has made history both beautiful and exciting." In the Jewish press, the Chicago Jewish Star called it "captivating, with the drama of any good mystery… it has all the ingredients of a compelling work of fiction. Except that it's true."

Farrar, Straus and Giroux published her 2016 book, Till We Have Built Jerusalem: Architects of a New City, which Publishers Weekly calls "a scintillating study" and Haaretz describes as "beautifully written . . . a captivating detective story . . . a passionate, lyrical defense of a Jerusalem that could still be,"

In 2019 Yale University Press brought out Hoffman's Ben Hecht: Fighting Words, Moving Pictures as part of their Jewish Lives series. Booklist gave the book a starred review and called it a "precise and lively portrait... Each phase in Hecht's adventures is electrifying ... Hoffman's concentrated biography is smartly entertaining and revelatory." On the publisher's website, film historian and critic Noah Isenberg describes the book as "thoroughly absorbing, compulsively readable" and says it "gives a critical but sympathetic account of the pugnacious, brilliant Ben Hecht. A highly gifted storyteller, Hoffman shows just how important Hecht was in his day, and why he matters now." David Denby, writing in The New Yorker, calls the book "superb," and says that Hoffman "writes with enormous flair." The book was a finalist for the 2020 PEN/Jacqueline Bograd Weld Prize for Biography and was named one of the best paperbacks of 2020 by the Sunday Times, which dubbed it "a revelation."

Hoffman was the film critic for The Jerusalem Post from 1993 to 2000 and the American Prospect from 2000 to 2002. Her essays and criticism have appeared in The Nation, The Washington Post, the Times Literary Supplement, Raritan, The New York Times, Bookforum, The Boston Globe, New York Newsday, Tin House, and on the World Service of the BBC. She was one of the founders and editors of Ibis Editions, a small, Jerusalem-based press devoted to the literature of the Levant. Hoffman has been a visiting professor at Wesleyan University and Middlebury College, and in 2009 was the Franke Fellow at Yale’s Whitney Humanities Center. During the summer of 2011 she was the Distinguished Writer in Non-Fiction at New York University’s McGhee School. She currently teaches in the Humanities Program at Yale and is affiliated with Yale's Council on Middle East Studies.

== Awards and honors ==
- 2020 PEN /Jacqueline Bograd Weld Award for Biography, finalist
- 2013 Windham–Campbell Literature Prize
- 2012 American Library Association's Sophie Brody Medal for Outstanding Jewish Literature (with Peter Cole)
- 2011 John Simon Guggenheim Foundation Fellowship
- 2010 Wingate Prize

== Works ==
=== Books ===
- House of Windows: Portraits from a Jerusalem Neighborhood ISBN 0-7679-1019-2
- My Happiness Bears No Relation to Happiness: A Poet's Life in the Palestinian Century ISBN 0-300-16427-0
- Sacred Trash: The Lost and Found World of the Cairo Geniza (with Peter Cole) ISBN 0-8052-4258-9
- Till We Have Built Jerusalem: Architects of a New City ISBN 0-374-28910-7
- Ben Hecht: Fighting Words, Moving Pictures ISBN 0-30018042-X

=== Selected essays ===
- "No Small Parts," Raritan, Spring 2021
- "The L Word," The Nation, September 14–21, 2015
- "Salaam Cinema," The Nation, October 7, 2013
- "Imagining the Real," Raritan, Spring 2012
- "In Search of Yitzhaq Shami," Raritan, Winter 2009
- "What Lies Beneath," The Nation, July 30, 2008
- "Lives on the Ground," The Nation, February 18, 2008
- "Recollecting the Palestinian Past," Raritan, Autumn 2006
- "Letter from Jerusalem," The Jewish Quarterly, Winter 2005/06
- "Letter from Jerusalem," The Jewish Quarterly, Autumn 2004
- "The Face of Spain and South from Granada," Tin House, Fall 2000
