= Hanna Mina =

Syrian writer

Hanna Mina حنا مينة
- Born: 9 March 1924; Latakia, Alawite State
- Died: 21 August 2018 (aged 94); Damascus, Syria
- Occupation: Novelist
- Writing career
- Language: Arabic
- Movement: Social Realism

Hanna Mina (Arabic: حنا مينة; 9 March 1924 – 21 August 2018) was a Syrian novelist, described in Literature from the "Axis of Evil" as the country's "most prominent" writer.

His early novels belong to the movement of social realism in the literature of Syria, and focus on class conflict; his later works contain "a more symbolic analysis of class differences". His writing on the suffering of ordinary people was partly inspired by his own experiences, alternately working as a stevedore, barber and journalist; his autobiographical short story, "On the Sacks", was published in 1976.

Several of his works written in Arabic are set during the period of the French Mandate of Syria, or in the period immediately following independence. Mina has authored about 40 novels, varying in imaginary value and narrative significance. But his achievement lies in the foundation he laid for this literary genre. For his collective works and novels, Mina was awarded the Arab Writer's Prize in 2005.

== Early life ==
Born to a Christian Arab family in Latakia in 1924, Hanna Mina spent his childhood in one of the villages near Iskenderun. Following the occupation of Turkish forces in the district (Hatay State), he moved back to Latakia with his family. Although with only an elementary school certificate, Mina used to write letters and petitions to the government on behalf of illiterates, and distributed the Communist Sawt al-Shaab (Voice of the People) newspaper alongside working as a barber.

== Career ==
In 1947, he moved to Beirut in search for a job, and later to Damascus, where he began his literary career. In the 1950s, Mina joined the Damascus newspaper al-Inshaa as a trainee editor. He was paid a monthly salary of a mere 100 Syrian pounds and lived in relative poverty.

He wrote several short stories, which brought him into literary circles, and he co-founded the Syrian Writers Union in 1951 and later became the editor- in-chief of al-Inshaa. His first novel was The Blue Lamps, published in 1954. Although slowly gaining fame and prestige and becoming one of Syria's renowned writers, he never stopped reflecting on the harsh reality of his earlier life, which he considered as "fuel" for his novels. Commenting on this experience, he said that "reality carves its inscriptions on human skin with a hot iron that leaves permanent marks and scars".

White Ebony is a collection of his short stories published in 1976.

His 1977 novel The Swamp, which invoked fragments of Mina's childhood in modern-day Hatay province of Turkey, was described by literary critic Salah Fadl as “the greatest autobiography in Arabic novel-writing, and the most abundant in brutal honesty and wealth of thought." Mina's 1989 novel The End of a Brave Man (Nihayat Rajul Shujaa) was adapted into a 1994 television miniseries of the same name.

Among the works selected by the Project of Translation from Arabic (PROTA), his 1993 novel Fragments of Memory: A Story of a Syrian Family was translated into English and first published by University of Texas Press. In 2004, it was republished by Interlink Books.

== Death ==
Mina died on 21 August 2018 in Damascus, aged 94.

== Legacy ==
In Syria, the Culture Ministry annually awards the Hanna Mina Prize for Literature. However, following the Fall of the Assad regime, the award’s current status remains unclear.

== See also ==
- Syrian literature since the 20th century
- Modern Arabic literature
- Leaving at Dusk
