= Swamp Creek (Missouri) =

Stream in the American state of Missouri

Swamp Creek or Swamp Branch is a stream in Oregon County in the Ozarks of southern Missouri. It is a tributary of Frederick Creek.

The stream headwaters are at 36°33′22″N 91°14′30″W and the confluence with Frederick Creek is at 36°34′18″N 91°13′35″W.

Swamp Creek was so named on account of wetlands near its course.

== See also ==
- List of rivers of Missouri
