= Tahish al-Huban =

Book by Zayd Mutee' Dammaj

Tahish al-Huban is a short story collection by Yemeni writer Zayd Mutee' Dammaj. It was first published in 1973, and was Dammaj's first published work.

The book's title is the name of one of the short stories in the collection. The title refers to a hyena-wolf hybrid called a tahish in Yemeni Arabic.
