= The Blue Lamps =

Novel written by Syrian writer Hanna Mina

- Author: Hanna Mina
- Language: Arabic
- Subject: Syria under World War II
- Genre: Novel
- Publication date: 1954
- Publication place: Syria
- Pages: 317 pages

The Blue Lamps (Arabic: المصابيح الزرق) is an Arabic novel written by the Syrian writer Hanna Mina.

== Plot ==
The Blue Lamps is a story about a group of simple people in the days of World War II, the community in Latakia City, Syria in general, and how the lamps are painted blue to simulate the view of distant beacons covered by fog during the war time. We observe this through the eyes of the protagonist ‘Faris’ and his character’s evolution from a youngster to an adult man. The novelist went beyond the concept of "The Impact of War on People," depicting a full life in which the war crisis plays a major role, but the group of people who disturb the book's Deuteronomy’s, their daily lives, how they treat each other, how they struggle to live, how their own interests relate to their nation's issues, and how they understand the struggle, plays a larger role. Despite the fact that the narrative begins and finishes with ‘Faris’, he is not the sole hero in the story. A variety of destitute families’ dwell in the Grand Home, including “Um Saqr”, the old woman who serves in the house and her young unemployed son and the Black-Mariam and her husband, Nayef, who’s nicknamed stallion, all of them depicted in their own narrative.

The novel was broadcast as a Syrian television series, and translated into Russian and Chinese.
