= The Swamp (novel) =

1977 novel by Syrian writer Hanna Mina

The Swamp is a novel by the Syrian novelist Hanna Mina, published in 1977. It is the second book of a trilogy inspired by the author's early life in the modern-day Turkish province of Hatay that used to be inhabited by Arabic-speaking people from neighbouring north-western Syria.

== Plot ==
The story takes place in the Sanjak of Alexandretta, 'Saz' in Turkish, meaning 'Swamp,' during the Second World War. The French Mandate had, according to Mina "in collusion with other countries", decided to hand over the Sanjak to Turkey. These events coincided with a severe economic crisis known as "Al-Kariza," which forced people to endure harsh measures to secure their lives, including collecting insects.

Consequently, and due to eating raw snails and the insufficiency of other food, the neighbourhood was hit with a mysterious illness, the municipality imposed quarantine on the infected individuals, out of fear that the disease might be Cholera. Quarantining people, alongside the hunger and illness, did not have positive outcomes; hence, suicide spread.
