= Avraham Ben-Yitzhak =

Hebrew poet

Avraham Ben-Yitzhak (Hebrew: אַבְרָהָם בֶּן יִצְחָק, lit. 'Abraham, son of Isaac'; 1883–1950), pen name of Avraham Sonne, was a Hebrew poet. Although he published only eleven poems during his lifetime, he is considered a distinguished figure in modern Hebrew poetry.

== Biography ==
He was born Avraham Sonne, on September 13, 1883, in Przemyśl, Austrian Galicia, a region of Eastern Europe which has changed hands throughout history between Austria and Poland. He was raised in the home of his maternal grandparents, where he received a traditional religious education and was tutored privately in secular subjects. As a teenager he took part in Zionist activities and read widely in German modernism, and by the age of fifteen he was writing Hebrew poems influenced by Trakl, Rilke and Hofmannsthal. He went on to study at the universities of Vienna and Berlin.

In 1913 he was invited to lecture at the Hebrew Teachers' Seminary in Jerusalem. On the day he arrived, the carriage taking him from the train station overturned and he suffered a serious spinal injury. After recovering in Vienna he returned to Jerusalem and taught Hebrew literature and psychology at the seminary through the summer of 1914, before going back to Vienna. After a brief career in the Zionist organization, he worked as a teacher and later as principal at the Hebrew Pedagogium (Teachers' Academy) in Vienna, founded by H. P. Chajes. In the early 1930s he contracted tuberculosis and spent time in a sanatorium.

After the Anschluss in March 1938 he fled Austria through Italy and Switzerland, and by August of that year he had settled in Jerusalem. In the 1940s he formed a close friendship with the poet Leah Goldberg, who later wrote a memoir about him, Encounter with a Poet. In his last years he faced financial hardship and was repeatedly hospitalized. He died of tuberculosis in 1950 at a rest home near Tel Aviv.

He was a friend of Elias Canetti, who met him in 1933. Canetti describes "Dr. Sonne" in his autobiographical book Das Augenspiel (The Play of the Eyes). In his description, Avraham Ben-Yitzhak appears as a profound scholar with interests in religion, philosophy, psychology and sociology. Dr. Sonne had a lasting influence on Canetti, who later wrote a profile of him in the April 7, 1986, edition of The New Yorker. He was also a friend of James Joyce. Most of all, and especially in his later years, his friends remembered him for his long silences.

== Poetry ==
His first published poem, "Bright Winter" ("Ḥoref Bahir"), was written in 1903 and appeared in the journal Ha-Shilo'aḥ in 1908. Most of his poems appeared before World War I and immediately attracted attention. His last poem, "Happy Are They That Sow But Shall Not Reap", is regarded as a farewell to his craft and ends with the words "And their everlasting lot shall be silence." He never published a book in his lifetime and declined offers from Hayim Nahman Bialik to have his poems and essays collected.

His short lyrics, written in a terse style and biblical diction, focus on nature, meditation and love. Their form sometimes recalls the Psalms, while their content expresses a modern outlook. He wrote according to the Sephardi pronunciation, the system later adopted in the Land of Israel, long before most other Hebrew poets, who used the Ashkenazi accent. His prose included anonymous articles in German-Jewish periodicals and an essay on Mendele Mocher Sforim in Der Jude (1918–19).

== Legacy ==
Bialik credited him as a pioneer of the new wave of Hebrew poetry, and many consider him the first truly modern Hebrew poet. His refusal to publish further has never been fully explained; later poems were found among his papers after his death, while others that he had read to friends are lost. A first posthumous book of his poems appeared in an edition of 400 copies, and a collected edition (Kol Ha-Shirim, 1992) included poems discovered after his death. His work has been translated into English, German and Italian, including an English Collected Poems translated by Peter Cole (2003).
