= Zayd Mutee' Dammaj =

Yemeni author and politician

- Born: Zayd Mutee' Dammaj; 1943; As Sayyani District of Ibb Governorate
- Died: 20 March 2000 (aged 56–57); London, UK
- Occupations: novelist, writer

Zayd Mutee' Dammaj (Arabic: زيد مطيع دماج) (1943 - March 20, 2000) was a Yemeni author and politician. He is best known for his short novel The Hostage which was selected by the Arab Writers Union as one of the top 100 Arabic novels of the 20th century.

== Life and work ==
Dammaj was born in As Sayyani District of Ibb Governorate. His father Sheikh Mutee' bin Abdullah Dammaj was a committed revolutionary activist against the rule of Imam Yahya and went on to establish a political party named Al-Ahrar in Aden in 1943. He was imprisoned that year in Al-Shabakah Prison, located in Taiz province, for his political activities. However, in April 1944 managed to escape on foot to Aden. Sheikh Mutee' continued his struggle against the Imamate regime and became the first governor of Ibb Governorate after the revolution of 1962.

The young Dammaj was educated in the village madrasa and at home, before his father sent him to a school in Taiz, where he boarded with friends of his father. In 1958, Dammaj went to Egypt where he studied in schools in Bani Suwayf and Tanta, before enrolling in Cairo University in 1964. He studied law for a couple of years before deciding to switch to journalism. He had already started to write political articles and short fiction that was published in the New Yemen periodical. In 1968, still in the middle of his studies, he was summoned back home to participate in the anti-royalist movement with his father.

In 1970, Dammaj was elected to the Shura Council, regarded as Yemen's first elected parliament, as a representative of his native district of As-Sayyani. His political rise continued: in 1976 he was appointed governor of the Mahweet governorate, and in 1980 he became Yemen's ambassador to Kuwait. In 1982, he cemented his place in Yemen's political hierarchy when he was elected to the Permanent Committee of the General People's Congress, the ruling party at the time.

Parallel to his political career, Dammaj also pursued a career as a literary writer. His first volume of short stories was published in 1973, while Al-Rahinah (The Hostage) was published in 1984. It went through multiple printings in Arabic and has since been translated into French, English, German and Hindi, among others. It is widely regarded as the most famous Yemeni novel and a classic of modern Arabic literature.

Dammaj was 57 when he died on March 20, 2000, in Middlesex Hospital in London. His eldest son Hamdan Dammag is a Yemeni/British computer scientist and a prize-winner novelist, who has also published several books of poetry and short stories.

== Books ==
- Tahish al-Huban (1973), short story collection
- Al-'Aqrab (The Scorpion) (1982), short story collection
- Al-Rahinah (The Hostage) (1984), novel. English translation by May Jayyusi and Christopher Tingley.
- The Bridge (1986), short story collection
- The Sorrows of the Girl Mayyasa (1990), short story collection
- Al-Inbihar wa Al-Dahshah (The Amazement and the Astonishment) (2000), memoirs
- Al-Madfa' Al-Asfar (The Yellow Cannon) (2001), short story collection
- Al-Madrasah Al-Ahmadiyah (The Ahmadi School), novel—not complete.
