= War in the Land of Egypt =

1991 film

- Directed by: Salah Abu Seif
- Screenplay by: Mohsen Zayed
- Story by: Yusuf al-Qa'id
- Starring: Omar Sharif
- Cinematography: Tarek El-Telmissany
- Music by: Yasser Abdel Rahman
- Release date: July 1991
- Running time: 90 minutes
- Country: Egypt
- Language: Egyptian Arabic

War in the Land of Egypt or The Egyptian Citizen (Egyptian Arabic: المواطن مصرى, translit.El-Moaten Masry) is a 1991 Egyptian drama film directed by Salah Abu Seif, and starring Omar Sharif. It is based on the 1978 novel of the same name by Yusuf al-Qa'id. The film was entered into the 17th Moscow International Film Festival.

== Synopsis ==
A mayor (Omar Sharif) has many children, and when his youngest son is drafted to serve in the Yom Kippur War of 1973, the family patriarch trades two acres of land to a simple farmer (Ezzat El Alaili) in exchange for the latter’s son to serve in the privileged scion’s place. The situation is complicated when the mayor wins a case against the Land Registry, resulting in an order evicting the farmer from their land in favor of the mayor’s ownership. The farmer forges the title to new land after paying a bribe, but his son ultimately dies in combat, leading to deep regrets over how the money was earned. The duplicity is contrasted with the general solidarity between citizens and soldiers in the war.

== Cast ==
- Omar Sharif
- Ezzat El Alaili
- Safia El Emari
- Abdullah Mahmoud
- Khaled El Nabawy
- Ashraf Abdel Baqi
- Hassan Hosny
- Enaam Salousa
- Almontaser Bellah
- Hanan Shawky
