= Yusuf al-Qa'id =

Egyptian writer

- Born: April 2, 1944 Al-Dahiriya, Beheira Governorate, Egypt
- Occupation: Novelist; Essayist; Journalist; Politician
- Notable works: War in the Land of Egypt (1978)

Yusuf al-Qa'id (Arabic: يوسف القعيد, romanized: Yūsuf al-Qaʿīd; born 2 April 1944) is a writer, novelist, and member of the Parliament of Egypt. He is best known for his novel War in the Land of Egypt. (Arabic: الحرب في برّ مصر, romanized: Al-Ḥarb fī Barr Miṣr; 1978),

== Life ==
Al-Qa'id was born in 1944 in the village of al-Dahiriya, near Itay El Barud, in Egypt's Beheira Governorate. He has described himself as "a son of the July Revolution", and cited Gamal Abdel Nasser as his childhood hero. He served in the Egyptian armed forces from 1965-74, a time period that saw Egypt's involvement in the Six-Day War of 1967 and the Yom Kippur War of 1973. After leaving the military, he worked as a literary editor for Al Musawwar magazine, becoming deputy editor-in-chief in 2000.

His most famous novel, War in the Land of Egypt (1978), was selected by the Arab Writers Union as one of the best 100 Arabic novels of the 20th century. The novel is set during the 1973 Yom Kippur War, and criticizes the Egyptian government's corruption - prompting the Sadat regime to ban the book. The novel became available in Egypt in 1985, and was the basis for the 1991 film of the same name, starring Omar Sharif. An English translation was published by Interlink in 1997, by Olive Kenny, Lorne Kenny, and Christopher Tingley.

== Literary themes and style ==
Al-Qa'id is also known for his writing in vernacular Egyptian Arabic. His 1994 novel Laban el-Asfur (Egyptian Arabic: لبن العصفور, romanized: Laban il-ʿAṣfūr, lit. 'The Milk of the Bird') was the first major Arabic vernacular novel of the modern era. Although criticized for his language choice at the time, vernacular novels in Egypt have been relatively uncontroversial since.

== Member of Parliament ==
In 2015, Egyptian President Abdel Fattah el-Sisi appointed Qa'id to the country's parliament. In 2019, he announced that he had stopped writing novels because he was too busy with his parliamentary duties.

Qa'id is a staunch supporter of President Sisi.

== Works ==
Novels

- Mourning (1969) (Ar: الحِداد)
- News of Al-Manisi Village (1971) (Ar: أخبار عزبة المنيسي)
- Days of Drought (1973) (Ar: أيام الجفاف)
- Hibernation (1974) (Ar: البيات الشتوي)
- There Are Seven Days in a Week (1975) (Ar: في الأسبوع سبعة أيام)
- Happening in Egypt Now (1976) (Ar: يحدث في مصر الآن)
- War in the Land of Egypt (1978) (Ar: الحرب في بر مصر)
- Complaints of the Eloquent Egyptian (1981) (Ar: شكاوي المصري الفصيح)
- Night of Love and Blood (1982) (Ar: ليلة العشق والدم)
- Who's Afraid of Camp David? (1985) (Ar: من يخاف كامب ديفيد؟)
- Beloved Country (1987) (Ar: بلد المحبوب)
- White Hearts (1987) (Ar: القلوب البيضاء)
- The Pain of Distance (1989) (Ar: وجع البعاد)
- Bird's Milk (1994) (Ar: لبن العصفور)
- Ruins of the Day (1997) (Ar: أطلال النهار)
- 24 Hours Only (1999) (Ar: أربع وعشرون ساعة فقط)
- Train to Upper Egypt (2001) (Ar: قطار الصعيد)
- Unknown (2013) (Ar: مجهول)

Short story collections

- Drying Tears (1981) (Ar: تجفيف الدموع)
- Stories from Poor Countries (1983) (Ar: قصص من بلاد الفقراء)
- Who Remembers the Other Egypt? (1984) (Ar: من يذكر مصر الأخرى)
- Laughter is No Longer Possible (1987) (Ar: الضحك لم يعد ممكنا)
- Impossible Crying (1990) (Ar: البكاء المستحيل)
- Peasants Ascend to Heaven (2005) (Ar: الفلاحون يصعدون إلى السماء)
- Tarh al-Bahr (2007) (Ar: طرح البحر)

Other works

- Voices of Silence (1991) (Ar: أصوات الصمت)
- The Red Book: My Journey in the Autumn of the Soviet Dream (1992) (Ar: الكتاب الأحمر رحلاتى في خريف الحلم السوفيتي)
- From the Nile Papers (Diaries) (1992) (Ar: من أوراق النيل (يوميات))
