= The Secret Life of Saeed: The Pessoptimist =

1974 novel by Emile Habibi

- Author: Emile Habibi
- Translator: Trevor LeGassick and Salma Khadra Jayyusi
- Language: Arabic
- Genre: Satire
- Publication date: 1974
- Media type: Book

The Secret Life of Saeed, The Ill-Fated Pessoptimist: A Palestinian Who Became a Citizen of Israel (Arabic: الوقائع الغريبة في اختفاء سعيد أبي النحس المتشائل) is a 1974 satirical epistolary novel by Emile Habibi.

The novel's name comes from merging the Arabic words for pessimist (al-mutasha'im المتشائم) and optimist (al-mutafa'il المتفائل), to describe the narrator Saeed's unique way of viewing the world. Saeed, the novel's narrator, frequently recounts tragic events related to his family and the plight of Palestinians, but he adds in comic flourishes to highlight his "optimistic" side.

== Narrative and Plot ==
Habibi used a comic mode to mitigate the intensity of his world in Israel and to make the story easier for readers to understand. This would have been more difficult had he used a straightforward historical narrative. Habiby showed his resistance against oppressive Israeli policies by using Arabic literary expressions and traditions.

The story begins with a Palestinian man named Saeed, who writes in a letter to an unnamed recipient that he was visited by aliens from outer space. The aliens have taken him into their ship, from which he is telling his story in the form of letters. The letters describe Saeed's life in Israel, after he was forced to flee from his childhood home during the 1948 Arab–Israeli War. Later, he becomes an informant for Israeli intelligence. Saeed and his wife Baqiyya (باقية, which means "she who has remained" in Arabic) have one son together, Walaa. Unlike his father, Walaa becomes a member of the resistance, and he and his mother are later killed by Israeli forces. Despite Saeed's cooperation with Israel, he is sent to prison multiple times, where he is assaulted by the guards. In the end of the novel, the narrator expresses his ambivalence about Saeed and the reality of the events that he recounted. He tracks down a resident at a mental institution, called Sa'di, who may be the writer of the letters.

== Reception ==
The Secret Life of Saeed: The Pessoptimist is regarded as a classic of Arabic literature, and was ranked the 6th-best Arabic novel of the 20th century by the Arabic Writers Union. Nancy Coffin wrote that the book's success "lies in its ability to straddle the expectations of both acceptable politics and good literature and, perhaps even more important, the fine lines between military response and political solution."

Salma Khadra Jayyusi's forward to an English translation of the book stated that its "unanimous welcome" derived from the fact that it was "highly original, fresh, and, being cast in the straight ironic mode of comic fiction, it was a challenge to the existing modes of fiction in the Arab World."
