= Salma Khadra Jayyusi =

Palestinian poet, writer, translator and anthologist (died 2023)

- سلمى الخضراء الجيوسي
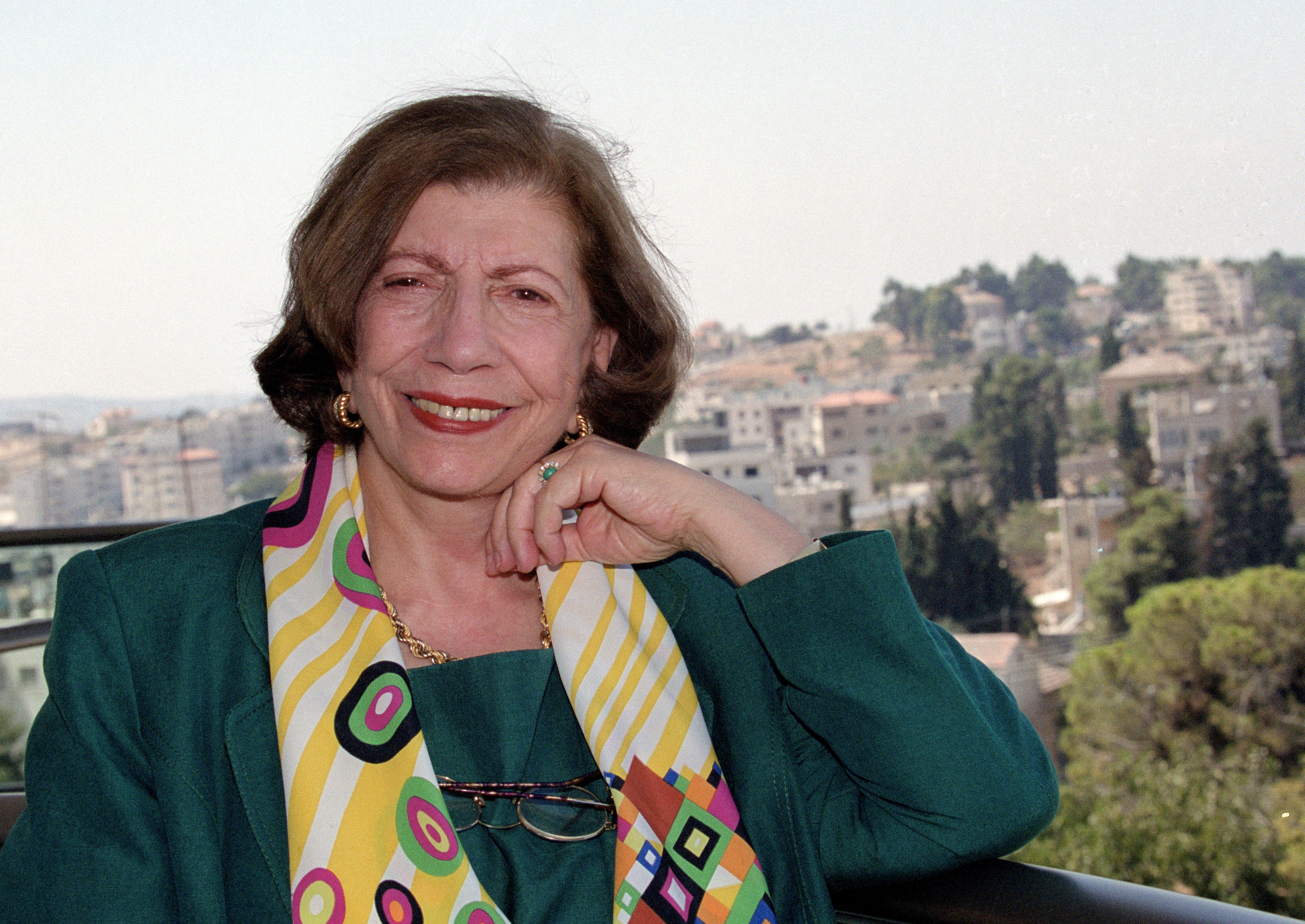
- Salma Jayyusi
- Born: 16 April 1925; Safed, Palestine
- Died: 20 April 2023 (aged 98); Amman, Jordan
- Known for: poet, writer, translator and anthologist
- Parent: Subhi al-Khadra (father)

Salma Khadra Jayyusi (Arabic: سلمى الخضراء الجيوسي; 16 April 1925 – 20 April 2023) was a Palestinian poet, writer, translator and anthologist. She was the founder and director of the Project of Translation from Arabic (PROTA), which aims to provide translation of Arabic literature into English.

== Biography ==
Jayyusi was born in Safed to a Palestinian father, the Arab nationalist Subhi al-Khadra, and a Lebanese mother. After attending secondary school in Jerusalem, she studied Arabic and English literature at the American University of Beirut. She married a Jordanian diplomat, with whom she travelled and raised three children.

In 1960, she published her first poetry collection, Return from the Dreamy Fountain. In 1970, she received her PhD on Arabic literature from the University of London. The title of her dissertation was "Trends and Movements in Modern Arabic Poetry".

She taught at the University of Khartoum from 1970 to 1973 and at the universities of Algiers and Constantine from 1973 to 1975. In 1973, she was invited by the Middle East Studies Association of North America (MESA) to go on a lecture tour of Canada and the US, on a Ford Foundation Fellowship. In 1975, the University of Utah invited her to return as a visiting professor of Arabic literature, and from then on, she was based at various universities in the United States.

To encourage the wider dissemination of Arabic literature and culture, Jayyusi founded the Project of Translation from Arabic (PROTA) in 1980. In 1990 she established East-West Nexus, a second venture aimed at making Arabic scholarly works available in English.

Jayyusi died in Amman, Jordan, on 20 April 2023.

== Works ==
- Trends and Movements in Modern Arabic Poetry, 2 vols, 1977
- (ed.) Modern Arabic poetry: an anthology, 1987
- (ed.) The Literature of modern Arabia: an anthology, Columbia University Press, 1988
- (ed.) Anthology of Modern Palestinian Literature, Columbia University Press, 1992
- (ed.) The Legacy of Muslim Spain, 2 vols, 1992
- (ed.) Modern Arabic drama: an anthology, 1995
- (tr. with Trevor LeGassick) The Secret Life of Saeed: The Pessoptimist by Emile Habibi, 2002.
- (ed.) Short Arabic plays: an anthology, 2003.
- (ed.) Modern Arabic fiction: an anthology, 2004.
- (ed.) Beyond the dunes: an anthology of modern Saudi literature, 2005
- (ed.) Human rights in Arab thought: a reader, 2009
- (ed.) Classical Arabic stories: an anthology, 2010.

== Awards ==
- 1998: Palestine Prize for Literature, Arts and Humanities, awarded by the Palestinian Ministry of Culture
- 2006: Al Owais Award for Scientific and Cultural Achievement
- 2010: Takreem Award for Cultural Excellence
- 2020: Sheikh Zayed Book Award, Cultural Personality of the Year
