= Emile Habibi =

Palestinian-Israeli writer of Arabic literature and politician (1922–1996)

- إميل حبيبي
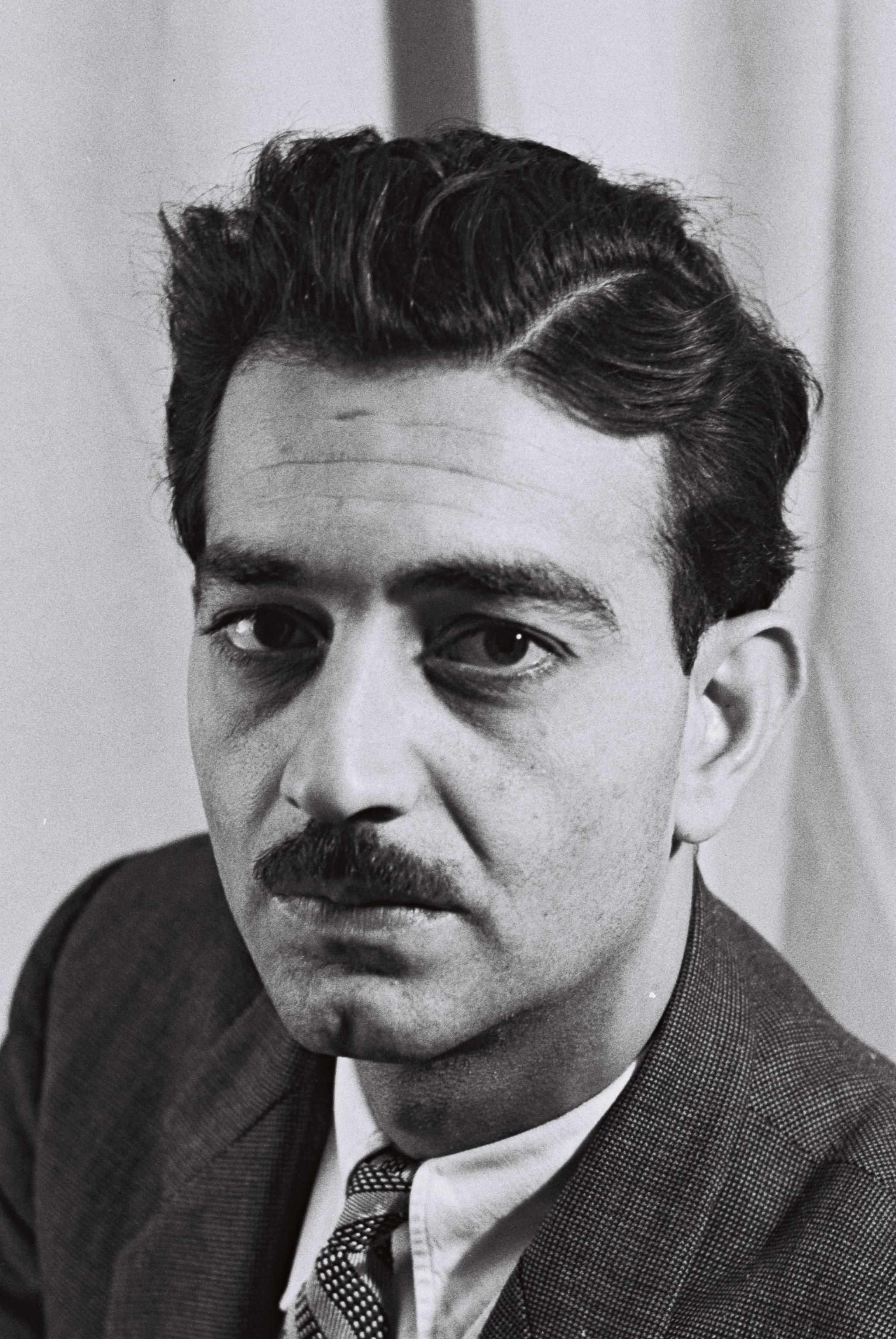
- Habibi in 1951

Faction represented in the Knesset
- 1951–1959: Maki
- 1961–1965: Maki
- 1965–1972: Rakah

Personal details
- Born: Emile Shukri Habibi; 28 January 1922 Haifa, Mandatory Palestine
- Died: 2 May 1996 (aged 74) Nazareth, Israel

Emile Shukri Habibi (Arabic: إميل حبيبي, romanized: ʾImīl Ḥabībī, Hebrew: אמיל חביבי; 28 January 1922 – 2 May 1996) was a Palestinian writer and politician with Israeli citizenship, who served as a member of the Knesset for the communist parties Maki and Rakah.

== Biography ==
Habibi was born in Haifa on 28 January 1922 into an Anglican Christian, Palestinian Arab family. His father originated in Shefa-Amr. The family had originally belonged to the Greek Orthodox Church of Jerusalem but converted to Anglicanism due to disputes within the Orthodox church. In his early life, he worked on an oil refinery and later was a radio announcer.

Under the Mandate he became one of the leaders of the Palestine Communist Party. When the 1948 Arab-Israeli War began, he remained in Haifa and became an Israeli citizen. After the war, he helped to create the Communist Party of Israel and established the communist paper Al-Ittihad.

In 1956, he moved from Haifa to Nazareth and remained there for the rest of his life. He died in 1996 in Nazareth, but in his will, he expressed his wish to be buried in his beloved home, Haifa. His will also asked that his tombstone include the phrase "remained in Haifa."

== Political career ==
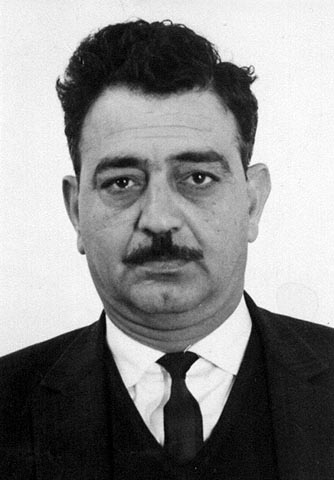
Habibi's official Knesset portrait

Habibi was one of the leaders of the Palestine Communist Party during the Mandate era. He supported the 1947 UN Partition Plan. When Israel became a state he helped form the Israeli Communist Party (Maki). He served in the Knesset between 1951 and 1959, and again from 1961 until 1972, first as a member of Maki, before breaking away from the party with Tawfik Toubi and Meir Vilner to found Rakah. In 1991, after a conflict about how the party should deal with the new policies of Mikhail Gorbachev, he left the party.

== Journalism and literary writings ==
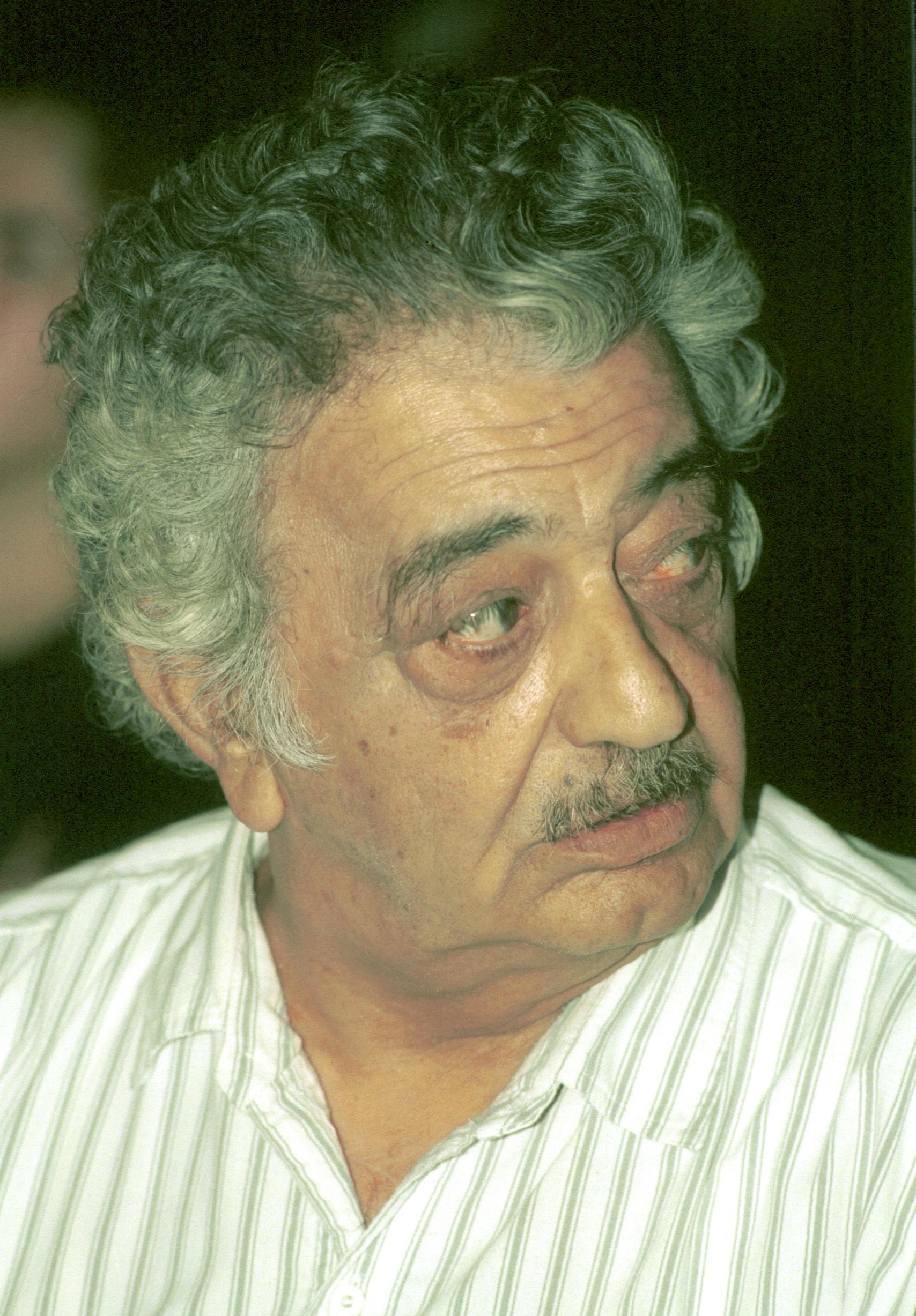
Habibi at a meeting of Arab writers, 1990

"Habibi became one of the most popular authors in the Middle East as a result of works depicting the conflicts in loyalties experienced by Palestinians living as an Arab minority in the Jewish state of Israel. In such works as Strange Events in the Disappearance of Said Abu al-Nahs al-Mutashael (1974), the most notable of his seven novels, he explored the duality of those Arabs who, like himself, did not leave their homeland during the 1948–49 Arab-Israeli war."

Habibi began writing short stories in the 1950s, and his first story, The Mandelbaum Gate was published in 1954, though he did not resume literary writing until the late 1960s.

In 1972 he resigned from the Knesset in order to write his first novel: The Secret Life of Saeed the Pessoptimist, which became a classic in modern Arabic literature. The book depicts the life of a Palestinian, employing black humour and satire. It was based on the traditional anti-hero Said in Arab literature. In a playful way it deals with how it is for Arabs to live in Israel, and how one who has nothing to do with politics is drawn into it. He followed this by other books, short stories and a play. His last novel, published in 1992, was Saraya, the Ogre's Daughter. In it he has a character state:

"There is no difference between Christian and Muslim: we are all Palestinian in our predicament"

== Literary prizes ==
In 1990, Habibi received the Al-Quds Prize from the PLO. In 1992, he received the Israel Prize for Arabic literature. His willingness to accept both reflected his belief in coexistence, though his acceptance of the Israel Prize set off a debate among the Arabic intellectual community. Habibi was accused of legitimizing what they considered Israel's "anti-Arab" policy. Habibi replied to the accusations: "A dialogue of prizes is better than a dialogue of stones and bullets," he said. "It is indirect recognition of the Arabs in Israel as a nation. This is recognition of a national culture. It will help the Arab population in its struggle to strike roots in the land and win equal rights".

== Published works ==
1969: Sudāsiyyat al-ayyām al-sittah

1974: Al-Waqāʾiʿ al-gharībah fī 'khtifāʾ Saʿīd Abī 'l-Naḥsh al-Mutashāʾil (translated as The Secret Life of Saeed the Pessoptimist)

1976: Kafr Qāsim (Kafr Kassem)

1980: Lakʿ bin Lakʿ (play)

1991: Khurāfiyyat Sarāyā Bint al-Ghūl (translated as Saraya, the Ogre's Daughter)
