= Israel lobby in the United States =

Pro-Israel interest groups in the United States

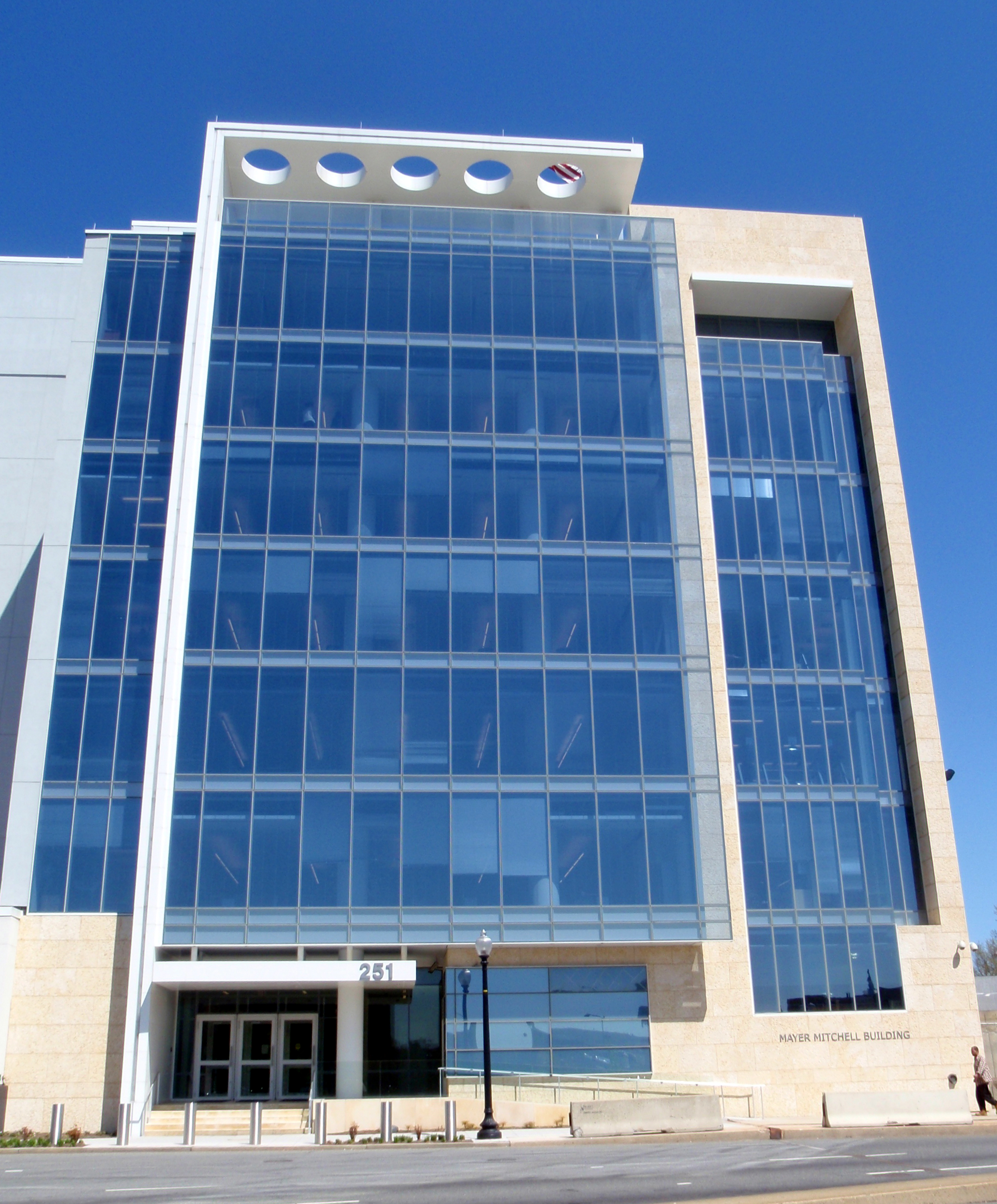
The AIPAC headquarters on Mount Vernon Triangle in Washington, D.C.

The Israel lobby in the United States comprises individuals and groups who seek to promote policies favorable to the State of Israel and oppose those they see as hostile to Israel's interests or Zionism. The largest American pro-Israel lobbying group is Christians United for Israel (CUFI), which has over seven million members. The American Israel Public Affairs Committee (AIPAC) is an influential organization within the lobby.

== History ==
=== 19th century ===
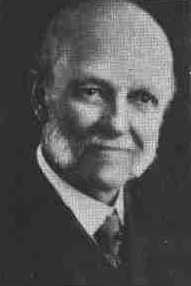
The Christian Zionist William E. Blackstone

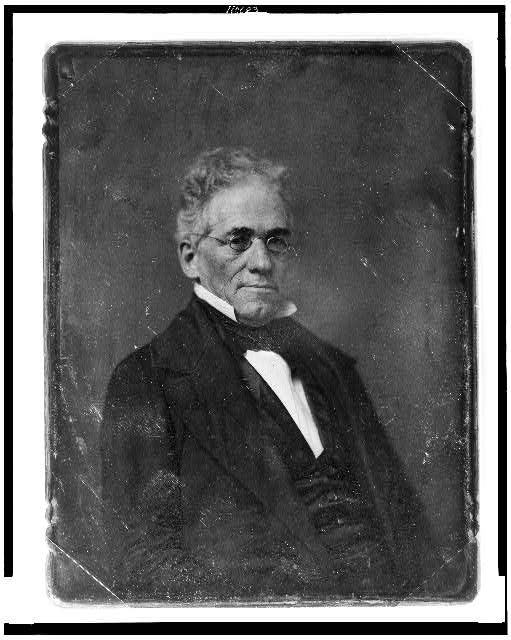
George Bush, a Christian restorationist

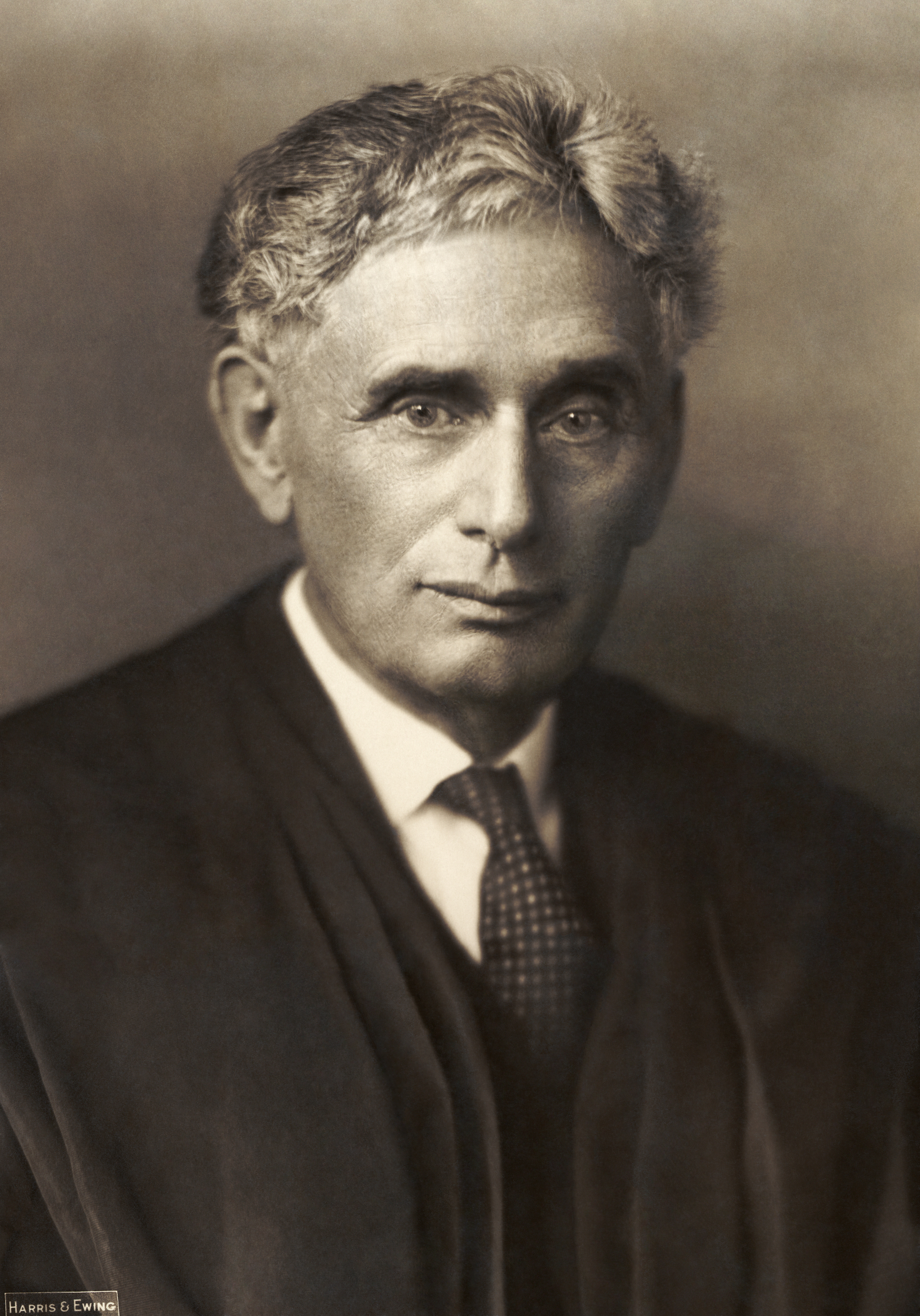
According to Donald Neff, Louis Brandeis—U.S. Supreme Court Justice (1916–39)—made Jewish Zionism a force in US politics for the first time as chair of the American Provisional Executive Committee for General Zionist Affairs and thereby leader of the Zionist Central Office of the Zionist Organization.

A Christian belief in the restoration of the Jews to the Holy Land has roots in the United States, which pre-date both the birth of the Zionist movement and the establishment of Israel. Lobbying by these groups, to influence the U.S. government in ways similar to Zionist ideology, dates back to at least the 19th century.

In 1844, George Bush, a Christian Zionist and Professor of Hebrew at New York University who was related to the Bush political family, published a book titled The Valley of Vision; or, The Dry Bones of Israel Revived. In it he denounced "the thralldom and oppression which has so long ground them (the Jews) to the dust", and called for "elevating" the Jews "to a rank of honorable repute among the nations of the earth" by restoring the Jews to the land of Israel where the bulk would be converted to Christianity. This, according to Bush, would benefit not only the Jews, but all of mankind, forming a "link of communication" between humanity and God. "It will blaze in notoriety ...." "It will flash a splendid demonstration upon all kindreds and tongues of the truth." The book sold about a million copies in the antebellum period. The Blackstone Memorial of 1891 was also a significant Christian Restorationist petition effort, led by William Eugene Blackstone, to persuade Benjamin Harrison, then the president of the United States, to pressure the Ottoman Sultan for the delivery of Palestine to the Jews.

=== 20th century ===
Beginning in 1914, the involvement of Louis Brandeis and his brand of American Zionism made Jewish Zionism a force on the American scene for the first time; under his leadership it had increased ten-fold to about 200,000. As chair of the American Provisional Executive Committee for General Zionist Affairs, Brandeis raised millions of dollars to relieve Jewish suffering in war-torn Europe, and from that time "became the financial center for the world Zionist movement".

The British Balfour Declaration additionally advanced the Zionist movement and gave it official legitimacy. The U.S. Congress passed the first joint resolution stating its support for a homeland in Palestine for the Jewish people on September 21, 1922. The same day, the Mandate for Palestine was approved by the Council of the League of Nations.

Zionist lobbying in the United States aided the creation of the State of Israel in 1947–48. The preparation of and voting for the United Nations Partition Plan for Palestine which preceded the Israeli Declaration of Independence, was met with an outpouring of Jewish American support and advocacy in Washington, D.C. U.S. President Harry S. Truman later noted, "The facts were that not only were there pressure movements around the United Nations unlike anything that had been seen there before, but that the White House, too, was subjected to a constant barrage. I do not think I ever had as much pressure and propaganda aimed at the White House as I had in this instance. The persistence of a few of the extreme Zionist leaders—actuated by political motives and engaging in political threats—disturbed and annoyed me."

In the 1950s, the American Zionist Committee for Public Affairs was created by Isaiah L. Kenen. During the presidency of Dwight D. Eisenhower, Israel's concerns were not at the forefront. Other problems in the Middle East and the Soviet Union were paramount, and Israel's American supporters were not as active as they had been. AZCPA formed a pro-Israel lobbying committee to counter rumors that the Eisenhower administration was going to investigate the American Zionist Council. AZCPA's executive committee decided to change their name from American Zionist Committee for Public Affairs to American Israel Public Affairs Committee.

The relationship between Israel and the U.S. government began with strong popular support for Israel and governmental reservations about the wisdom of creating a Jewish state; formal inter-government relations remained chilly until 1967.

Since the 1970s, the Anti-Defamation League, known for its pro-Israel advocacy, has promoted the concept of a new antisemitism, describing criticism of Israel or opposition to Zionism as antisemitic. After the 1967 Arab–Israeli War, the ADL, with the support of AIPAC founder Isaiah L. Kenen, "sought to portray certain 'anti-Israel' actions as anti-Semitic", especially with regard to international calls for Israel to end its occupation of the West Bank, according to historian Ilan Pappé.

Prior to 1967, the federal government of the United States provided some aid but was generally neutral towards Israel. However, in each year between 1976 and 2004, Israel received the most direct foreign assistance from the U.S. of any nation, approximately 0.1% of the $3 trillion U.S. annual budget.

=== 21st century ===
During the 2026 elections, the Kentucky's 4th congressional district primary became the most expensive U.S. House primary in American history in May 11, 2026, with over $25.6 million in ad spending beating the prior record of $25.2 million from the Democratic Primary for New York's 16th congressional district in 2024. By May 17, ad spending exceeded $32 million, with pro-Israel interest groups accounting for over $9 million of the spending against Thomas Massie. Massie described the primary election as a "referendum on whether Israel gets to buy seats in Congress".

== Structure ==
The pro-Israel lobby is composed of formal and informal components.

=== Informal lobby ===
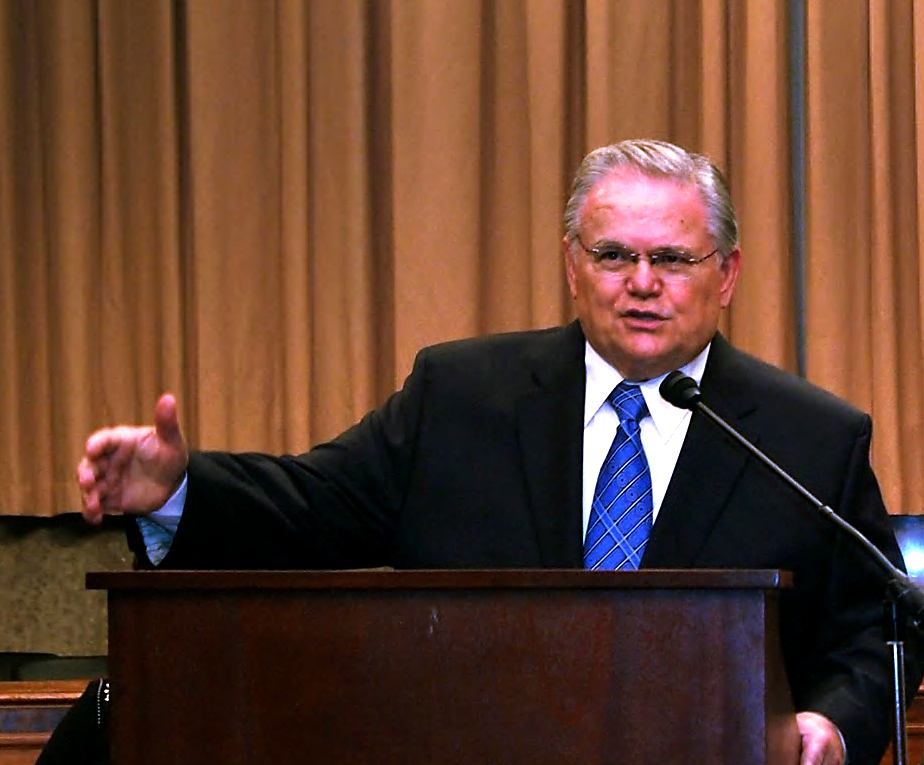
John Hagee, a Zionist pastor and televangelist of the Cornerstone Church megachurch, at the 2007 Christians United for Israel (CUFI) conference at the U.S. Capitol.

Support for Israel is strong among American Christians of many denominations. Informal Christian support for Israel includes a broad range varieties support for Israel ranging from the programming and news coverage on the Christian Broadcasting Network and the Christian Television Network to the more informal support of the annual Day of Prayer for the Peace of Jerusalem.

Informal lobbying also includes the activities of some Jewish groups. Some scholars view Jewish lobbying on behalf of Israel as one of many examples of a US ethnic group lobbying on behalf of an ethnic homeland, which has met with a degree of success largely because Israel is strongly supported by a far larger and more influential Christian movement that shares its goals. In a 2006 article in the London Review of Books, John Mearsheimer and Stephen Walt wrote:

In its basic operations, the Israel Lobby is no different from the farm lobby, steel or textile workers' unions, or other ethnic lobbies. There is nothing improper about American Jews and their Christian allies attempting to sway US policy: the Lobby's activities are not a conspiracy of the sort depicted in tracts like the Protocols of the Elders of Zion. For the most part, the individuals and groups that comprise it are only doing what other special interest groups do, but doing it very much better. By contrast, pro-Arab interest groups, in so far as they exist at all, are weak, which makes the Israel Lobby's task even easier.

Mitchell Bard defines the "informal lobby" as the indirect means through which "Jewish voting behavior and American public opinion" influence "U.S. Middle East policy". Bard described the motivation underlying the informal lobby as follows:

American Jews recognize the importance of support for Israel because of the dire consequences that could follow from the alternative. Despite the fact that Israel is often referred to now as the fourth most powerful country in the world, the perceived threat to Israel is not military defeat, it is annihilation. At the same time, American Jews are frightened of what might happen in the United States if they do not have political power.

=== Formal lobby ===
The formal component of the Israel lobby consists of organized lobby groups, political action committees (PACs), think tanks, and media watchdog groups. OpenSecrets, which tracks all lobbies and PACs, describes the 'background' of those 'Pro-Israel' as, "A nationwide network of local political action committees, generally named after the region their donors come from, supplies much of the pro-Israel money in US politics. Additional funds also come from individuals who bundle contributions to candidates favored by the PACs. The donors' unified goal is to build stronger Israel–United States relations and to support Israel in its negotiations and armed conflicts with its Arab neighbors."

According to Mitchell Bard, there are three key formal lobbying groups:

- Christians United for Israel, the US's "largest" pro-Israel lobby.
- The American Israel Public Affairs Committee (AIPAC) which directly lobbies the United States Congress
- The Conference of Presidents of Major American Jewish Organizations which "is the main contact between the Jewish community and the executive branch" of the US government.

Christians United for Israel give "every pro-Israel Christian and Christian church the opportunity to stand up and speak up for Israel". According to the group's founder and head, Pastor John Hagee, the members "ask the leadership of our government to stop putting pressure on Israel to divide Jerusalem and the land of Israel".

In his 2006 book The Restoration of Israel: Christian Zionism in Religion, Literature, and Politics, the sociologist Gerhard Falk describes the Evangelical Christian groups that lobby on behalf of Israel as being so numerous that "it is not possible to list" them all, although many are linked via the National Association of Evangelicals. It is a "powerful religious lobby" that actively supports Israel in Washington.

According to the author of Kingdom Coming: The Rise of Christian Nationalism, Michelle Goldberg, "Evangelical Christians have substantial influence on US Middle East Policy, more so than some better-known names such as AIPAC."

According to Mitchell Bard, the two Jewish groups aim to present policy makers with unified and representative messages via the aggregation and filtering of the diversity of opinions held by smaller pro-Israel lobby groups and the wider American Jewish community. The diverse spectrum of opinions held by American Jewry is reflected in the many formal pro-Israel groups, and as such some analysts make a distinction within the Israel lobby between right-leaning and left-leaning groups. This diversity became more pronounced following Israel's acceptance of the Oslo Accords, which split "liberal universalists" and "hard-core Zionists—the Orthodox community and right wing Jews". This division mirrored a similar split for and against the Oslo process in Israel, and led to a parallel rift within the pro-Israel lobby.

In 2008, Barack Obama implicitly noted differences within the lobby in his comment that "there is a strain within the pro-Israel community that says, 'unless you adopt an unwavering pro-Likud approach to Israel, that you're anti-Israel,' and that can't be the measure of our friendship with Israel." Commentary magazine notes, "It was an odd choice of words—Likud has not been Israel's governing party for more than three years—but what Obama clearly meant was that an American politician should not have to express fealty to the most hard-line ideas relating to Israel's security to be considered a supporter of Israel's."

The American foreign-policy scholars John Mearsheimer and Stephen Walt (of the University of Chicago and Harvard University, respectively), focusing almost exclusively on Jewish groups, define the core of the lobby to include AIPAC, the Washington Institute for Near East Policy, the Anti-Defamation League and Christians United for Israel. Other key organizations which they state work to benefit Israel, in many cases by influencing American foreign policy, include the American Jewish Congress, the Zionist Organization of America, the Israel Policy Forum, the American Jewish Committee, the Religious Action Center of Reform Judaism, Americans for a Safe Israel, American Friends of Likud, Mercaz-USA, and Hadassah. Fifty-one of the largest and most important come together in the Conference of Presidents of Major American Jewish Organizations, whose self-described mission includes "forging diverse groups into a unified force for Israel's well-being" and working to "strengthen and foster the special US-Israel relationship".

Stephen Zunes, in a response to Mearsheimer and Walt, lists "Americans for Peace Now, the Tikkun Community, Brit Tzedek v'Shalom, and the Israel Policy Forum" as "pro-Israel" organizations that, unlike the right-leaning organizations focused on by Mearsheimer and Walt, are opposed to "the occupation, the settlements, the separation wall, and Washington's unconditional support for Israeli policies". These organizations, however, are not PACs and therefore, like AIPAC, are prohibited by campaign finance regulations from financially supporting political campaigns of candidates for federal office.

Mearsheimer and Walt state in their controversial bestseller, The Israel Lobby and U.S. Foreign Policy, that the tone of the right-leaning component of the Israel lobby results from the influence of the leaders of the two top lobby groups: AIPAC and the Conference of Presidents of Major American Jewish Organizations. They go on to list, as right-leaning think tanks associated with the lobby, the Washington Institute for Near East Policy, the American Enterprise Institute, and the Hudson Institute. They also state that the media watchdog group Committee for Accuracy in Middle East Reporting in America (CAMERA) is part of the right-wing component of the lobby.

In The Case for Peace, Alan Dershowitz, also of Harvard, argues that the most right-leaning pro-Israel groups in the United States are not Jews at all, but Evangelical Christians. Dershowitz cites Stand for Israel, "an organization devoted to mobilizing Evangelical Christian support for Israel" co-founded by "[f]ormer Christian Coalition executive director Ralph Reed". He argues that,although the rhetoric of groups such as Stand for Israel is similar to their Jewish-based counterparts, some individuals have based their support on specific biblical passages, thus have been vulnerable to criticism from Israelis and US Jews for having "ulterior motives" such as the fulfillment of "prerequisite to the Second Coming" or having "better access for proselytizing among Jews".

The logo of J Street

In April 2008, J Street was established, describing itself as the only federal "pro-peace, pro-Israel" PAC. Its platform explicitly supports a two-state solution. Its claimed goal is to provide political and financial support to candidates for federal office from US citizens who believe a new direction in US policy will advance US interests in the Middle East and promote real peace and security for Israel. Founded by Jeremy Ben Ami, J Street supports politicians who favor diplomatic solutions over military ones, including with Iran; multilateral over unilateral approaches to conflict resolution; and dialogue over confrontation with a wide range of countries and actors.

== Means of influence ==
A number of commentators have asserted that the Israel lobby has undue or pervasive influence over U.S. foreign policy in the Middle East. However, pro-Israel commentators state that no similar volume of criticism exists concerning the NRA, AARP or other major political lobbies, and claim that much of this criticism is based on antisemitic notions of a Jewish conspiracy. Critics counter with the claim that accusations of antisemitism are often used cynically by supporters of the Israel lobby to stifle criticism of it.

=== Voting power ===
According to Bard, "Jews have devoted themselves to politics with almost religious fervor." He cites, "Jews have the highest percentage voter turnout of any ethnic group" and that of the American Jewish population "roughly 94 percent live in thirteen key electoral college states" which alone "are worth enough electoral votes to elect the president. If you add the non-Jews shown by opinion polls to be as pro-Israel as Jews, it is clear Israel has the support of one of the largest veto groups in the country." Bard goes on to say that for United States congressmen "there are no benefits to candidates taking an openly anti-Israel stance and considerable costs in both loss of campaign contributions and votes from Jews and non-Jews alike."

"Most important fact about the Jewish vote in America", according to Jeffrey S. Helmreich of the Jerusalem Center for Public Affairs, "lies in the fact that it is a uniquely swayable bloc.... The issue of support for Israel [by a candidate] has proven capable of spurring a sizable portion of Jews to switch parties—in large enough numbers to tip the scales in national or statewide elections."

=== Campaign donations ===
"Political campaign contributions", writes Mitchell Bard, "are also considered an important means of influence; typically, Jews have been major benefactors".

According to Bard, objective quantification that the impact of campaign contributions have on "legislative outcomes, particularly with regard to Israel-related issues" is difficult. This is because raw analysis of contributions statistics do not take into account "non-monetary factors" and whether or not "a candidate is pro-Israel because of receiving a contribution, or receives a donation as a result of taking a position in support of Israel".

AIPAC did not give donations directly to candidates until the early 2020s. Those who donated to AIPAC are often important political contributors in their own right. In addition, AIPAC helps connect donors with candidates, especially to the network of pro-Israel political action committees. AIPAC president Howard Friedman says "AIPAC meets with every candidate running for Congress. These candidates receive in-depth briefings to help them completely understand the complexities of Israel's predicament and that of the Middle East as a whole. We even ask each candidate to author a 'position paper' on their views of the US-Israel relationship – so it's clear where they stand on the subject."

This process has become more targeted over time according to Bard, "In the past, Jewish contributions were less structured and targeted than other interest groups, but this has changed dramatically as Israel-related PACs have proliferated." According to Mearsheimer and Walt, politicians considered unfriendly to Israel who AIPAC has helped defeat include Cynthia McKinney, Paul Findley, Earl F. Hilliard, Pete McCloskey, the U.S. senators William Fulbright and Roger Jepsen, and Adlai Stevenson III in his campaign for Governor of Illinois in 1982. The defeat of Charles H. Percy, Senator for Illinois until 1985, has been attributed to AIPAC-co-ordinated donations to his opponent after he supported the sale of AWACS planes to Saudi Arabia. Donations included $1.1 million on anti-Percy advertising by Michael Goland, who was also a major contributor to AIPAC. The former executive director of AIPAC Tom Dine was quoted as saying, "All the Jews in America, from coast to coast, gathered to oust Percy. And the American politicians – those who hold public positions now, and those who aspire – got the message".

Financial figures

A summary of pro-Israel campaign donations for the period of 1990–2008 collected by OpenSecrets indicates current totals and a general increase in proportional donations to the US Republican party since 1996. OpenSecrets' 1990–2006 data shows, "pro-Israel interests have contributed $56.8 million in individual, group and soft money donations to federal candidates and party committees since 1990." In contrast, Arab-Americans and Muslim PACs contributed slightly less than $800,000 during the same (1990–2006) period. In 2006, 60% of the Democratic Party's fundraising and 25% of that for the Republican Party's fundraising came from Jewish-funded PACs. According to a Washington Post estimate, Democratic presidential candidates depend on Jewish sources for as much as 60% of money raised from private sources.

=== Education of politicians ===
According to Mitchell Bard, Israel lobbyists also educate politicians by:

taking them on study missions to Israel. Once officials have direct exposure to the country, its leaders, geography, and security dilemmas, they typically return more sympathetic to Israel. Politicians also sometimes travel to Israel specifically to demonstrate their interest in Israel to the lobby. Thus, for example, George W. Bush made his only trip to Israel before deciding to run for President, in what was widely viewed as an effort to win the support of pro-Israel voters.

=== Think tanks ===
Mearsheimer and Walt state, "pro-Israel figures have established a commanding presence at the American Enterprise Institute, the Center for Security Policy, the Foreign Policy Research Institute, The Heritage Foundation, the Hudson Institute, the Institute for Foreign Policy Analysis, and the Jewish Institute for National Security Affairs (JINSA). These think tanks are all decidedly pro-Israel and include few, if any, critics of U.S. support for the Jewish state."

In 2002, the Brookings Institution founded the Saban Center for Middle East Policy, named after Haim Saban, an Israeli-American media proprietor, who donated $13 million toward its establishment. Saban has stated of himself, "I'm a one issue guy, and my issue is Israel", and was described by The New York Times as a "tireless cheerleader for Israel". The Centre was directed by AIPAC's former deputy director of research, Martin Indyk.

Frontline, an Indian current-affairs magazine, asked rhetorically why the administration of George W. Bush that seemed "so eager to please [Bush's] Gulf allies, particularly the Saudis, go out of its way to take the side of Ariel Sharon's Israel? Two public policy organizations give us a sense of an answer: the Washington Institute for Near East Policy (WINEP) and the Jewish Institute for National Security Affairs." Frontline reported, "WINEP tended to toe the line of whatever party came to power in Israel" while "JINSA was the U.S. offshoot of the right-wing Likud Party."

According to Frontline magazine, JINSA had close ties to the administration of George W Bush in that it "draws from the most conservative hawks in the U.S. establishment for its board of directors" including the U.S. vice president, Dick Cheney, and the Bush administration appointees John Bolton, Douglas Feith, Paul Wolfowitz, Lewis Libby, Zalmay Khalilzad, Richard Armitage, and Elliott Abrams. Jason Vest, writing in The Nation, alleges that both JINSA and the Center for Security Policy thinktanks are "underwritten by far-right American Zionists" and that they both "effectively hold there is no difference between US and Israeli national security interests, and that the only way to assure continued safety and prosperity for both countries is through hegemony in the Middle East – a hegemony achieved with the traditional cold war recipe of feints, force, clientism and covert action".

=== Media and public discourse from 2002 to 2006 ===
Stephen Zunes wrote in 2006, "mainstream and conservative Jewish organizations have mobilized considerable lobbying resources, financial contributions from the Jewish community, and citizen pressure on the news media and other forums of public discourse in support of the Israeli government." Also in 2006, journalist Michael Massing wrote, "Jewish organizations are quick to detect bias in the coverage of the Middle East, and quick to complain about it. That's especially true of late. As The Jewish Daily Forward observed in late April [2002], 'rooting out perceived anti-Israel bias in the media has become for many American Jews the most direct and emotional outlet for connecting with the conflict 6,000 miles away.'"

The April 2002 Forward article related how one individual felt:

"There's a great frustration that American Jews want to do something," said Ira Youdovin, executive vice president of the Chicago Board of Rabbis. "In 1947, some number would have enlisted in the Haganah," he said, referring to the pre-state Jewish armed force. "There was a special American brigade. Nowadays you can't do that. The battle here is the hasbarah war," Youdovin said, using a Hebrew term for public relations. "We're winning, but we're very much concerned about the bad stuff."

Indicative of the diversity of opinion in the early 2000s was a 2003 Boston Globe profile of the CAMERA media watchdog group in which Mark Jurkowitz observes: "To its supporters, CAMERA is figuratively – and perhaps literally – doing God's work, battling insidious anti-Israeli bias in the media. But its detractors see CAMERA as a myopic and vindictive special interest group trying to muscle its views into media coverage." A former spokesman for the Israeli Consulate in New York City said that the result of this lobbying of the media was: "Of course, a lot of self-censorship goes on. Journalists, editors, and politicians are going to think twice about criticizing Israel if they know they are going to get thousands of angry calls in a matter of hours. The Jewish lobby is good at orchestrating pressure."

In addition to traditional media, Israeli public relations during this time period were also supported with software called the Megaphone desktop tool, which was designed and promoted by pro-Israel interest groups and diplomats. Regarding the 'Megaphone', the Times Online reported in 2006 that the Israeli Foreign Ministry "ordered trainee diplomats to track websites and chatrooms so that networks of US and European groups with hundreds of thousands of Jewish activists can place supportive messages". According to a Jerusalem Post article on the 'Megaphone', Israel's Foreign Ministry was (in 2006) "urging supporters of Israel everywhere to become cyberspace soldiers 'in the new battleground for Israel's image.'" Christopher Williams wrote for The Register: "However it is used, Megaphone is effectively a high-tech exercise in ballot-stuffing. We're calling it lobbyware."

=== College campuses ===
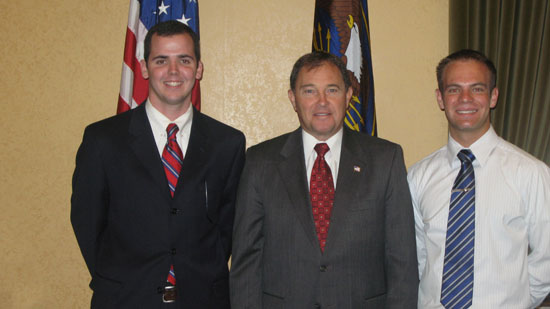
Pro-Israel representatives from Brigham Young University meet with Lt. Governor Gary R. Herbert in October 2008.

Since the early 2000s, there have been a number of organizations that focus on what could be called "pro-Israel activism" on college campuses. With the outbreak of the Al-Aqsa Intifada in 2001, these groups became increasingly visible. In 2002 an umbrella organization that includes many of these groups, known as the Israel on Campus Coalition, was formed as a result of what they felt were "the worrisome rise in anti-Israel activities on college campuses across North America". The stated mission of the Israel on Campus Coalition is to "foster support for Israel" and "cultivate an Israel friendly university environment".

Members of the Israel on Campus Coalition include the Zionist Organization of America, AIPAC, Americans for Peace Now, the Anti-Defamation League, KESHER, the Union of Progressive Zionists (Ameinu and Meretz USA/Partners for Progressive Israel). Although these groups are largely united in their support of Israel, there was internal conflict in 2007 when the right-wing Zionist Organization of America unsuccessfully attempted to remove the left-wing Union of Progressive Zionists from the coalition after the latter group sponsored lectures by a group of former Israel Defense Forces soldiers who criticized the Israeli occupation of the West Bank and Gaza. In December 2007, several student leaders who advocated pro-Israel films and groups on college campuses were supported by advocacy group StandWithUs as "emissaries of the Jewish state" for their work and would receive up to $1,000 a year from the Emerson foundation for their efforts.

There are some who feel that pro-Israel activism on college campuses can cross the line from advocacy to outright intimidation. One highly publicized accusation comes from the former U.S. president Jimmy Carter, who complained of great difficulty in gaining access to a number of universities to discuss his new book Palestine: Peace Not Apartheid which criticized certain Israeli policies. In October 2007, a group of 300 academics under the name the Ad Hoc Committee to Defend the University issued a statement in Inside Higher Ed calling for academic freedom from political pressure, in particular advocating openness and dialogue with groups identifying as supporters of Israel.

=== Coordination with Israeli officials ===
Rabbi Alexander Schindler, the former chair of the Conference of Presidents of Major Jewish Organizations (a US advocacy group), told an Israeli magazine in 1976, "The Presidents' Conference and its members have been instruments of official governmental Israeli policy. It was seen as our task to receive directions from government circles and to do our best no matter what to affect the Jewish community." Hyman Bookbinder, a high-ranking official of the American Jewish Committee, once said, "Unless something is terribly pressing, really critical or fundamental, you parrot Israel's line in order to retain American support. As American Jews, we don't go around saying Israel is wrong about its policies."

Bard noted in 2009, "by framing the issues in terms of the national interest, AIPAC can attract broader support than would ever be possible if it were perceived to represent only the interests of Israel. This does not mean AIPAC does not have a close relationship with Israeli officials; it does, albeit unofficially. Even so, the lobby sometimes comes into conflict with the Israeli government."

=== Responses to attacks on Israel and Jews ===
Zunes writes, "assaults on critics of Israeli policies have been more successful in limiting open debate, but this gagging censorship effect stems more from ignorance and liberal guilt than from any all-powerful Israel lobby." He goes on to explain that while "some criticism of Israel really is rooted in antisemitism", it is his opinion that some members of the Israel lobby cross the line by labeling intellectually honest critics of Israel as antisemitic. Zunes argues that the mainstream and conservative Jewish organizations have "created a climate of intimidation against many who speak out for peace and human rights or who support the Palestinians' right of self-determination." Zunes has been on the receiving end of this criticism himself "As a result of my opposition to US support for the Israeli government's policies of occupation, colonization and repression, I have been deliberately misquoted, subjected to slander and libel, and falsely accused of being 'antisemitic' and 'supporting terrorism'; my children have been harassed and my university's administration has been bombarded with calls for my dismissal."

In an opinion piece for The Guardian, Jimmy Carter wrote that mainstream American politics does not give equal time to the Palestinian side of the Israeli-Palestinian conflict and that this is due at least in part to AIPAC. George Soros pointed out that there are risks associated with what was in his opinion a suppression of debate:

I do not subscribe to the myths propagated by enemies of Israel and I am not blaming Jews for anti-Semitism. Anti-Semitism predates the birth of Israel. Neither Israel's policies nor the critics of those policies should be held responsible for anti-Semitism. At the same time, I do believe that attitudes toward Israel are influenced by Israel's policies, and attitudes toward the Jewish community are influenced by the pro-Israel lobby's success in suppressing divergent views.

In his book, The Deadliest Lies, Abraham Foxman referred to the notion that the pro-Israel lobby is trying to censor criticism of Israel as a "canard." Foxman writes that the Jewish community is capable of telling the difference between legitimate criticism of Israel "and the demonization, deligitization, and double standards employed against Israel that is either inherently anti-Semitic or generates an environment of anti-Semitism." Jonathan Rosenblum expressed similar thoughts: "Indeed, if there were an Israel lobby, and labeling all criticism of Israel as anti-Semitic were its tactic, the steady drumbeat of criticism of Israel on elite campuses and in the elite press would be the clearest proof of its inefficacy."

Alan Dershowitz wrote that he welcomes "reasoned, contextual and comparative criticism of Israeli policies and actions". If one of the goals of the pro-Israel lobby was to censor criticism of Israel, Dershowitz writes, "it would prove that 'the Lobby' is a lot less powerful than the authors would have us believe."

=== Digital campaign ===
The operation began weeks after the Gaza war, according to Israeli officials and documents related to the effort. According to messages seen by The Times, dozens of Israeli tech startups received emails and WhatsApp messages that month inviting them to join impromptu meetings to become Israel's "digital soldiers" during the war. Accordingly Israel's Ministry of Diaspora Affairs ordered the operation, which used fake social media accounts to push US lawmakers to fund the IDF. Haaretz found that hundreds of fake social media accounts were targeting Democratic Party lawmakers with messages repeating Israeli government accusations relating to UNRWA and Hamas.

== Debates ==
=== Degree of influence ===
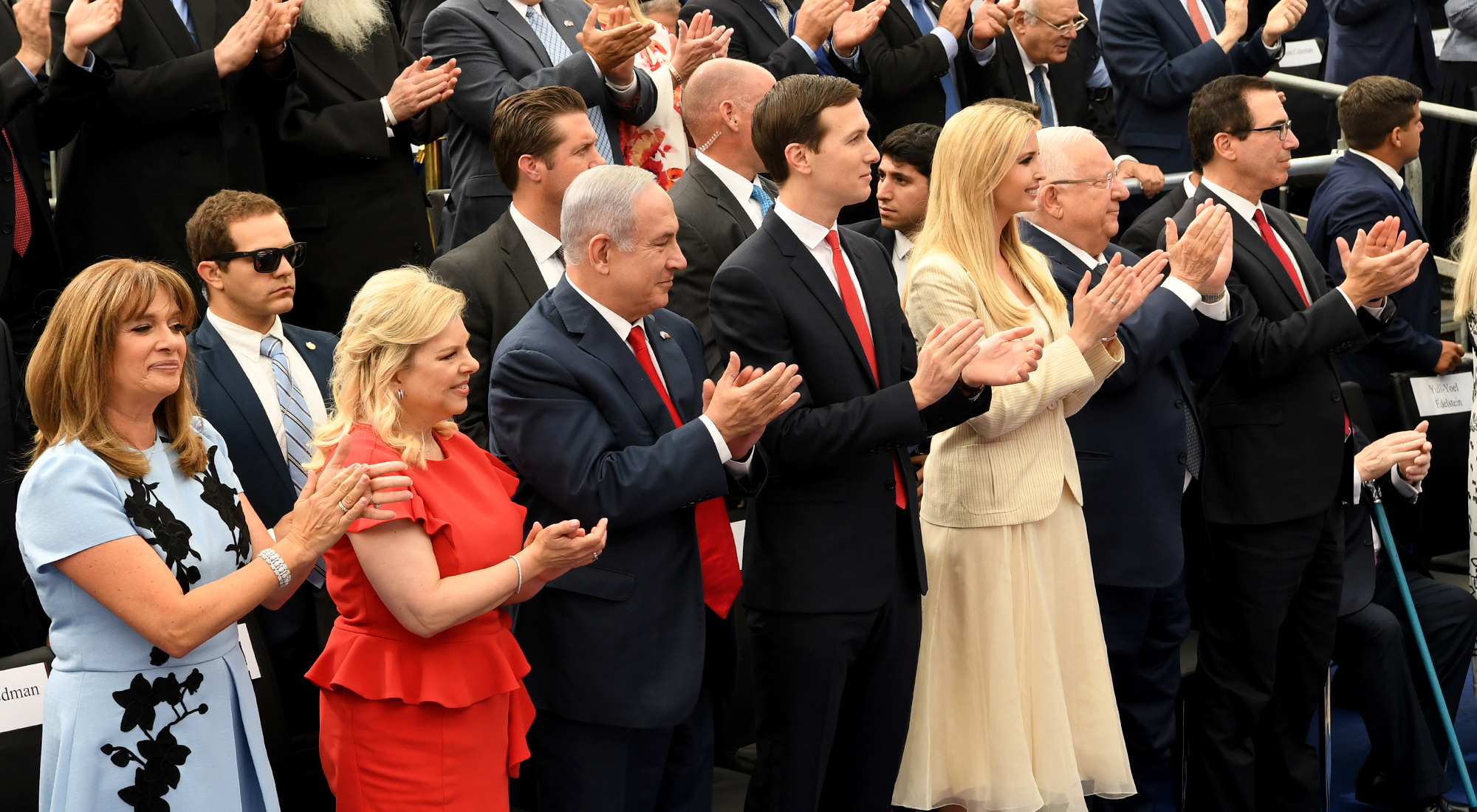
Dedication ceremony of the Embassy of the United States in Jerusalem, Israel, May 14, 2018

The impact of pro-Israel organizations and sentiment in the United States has been the subject of considerable academic and journalistic interest.

Miles Copeland, a founding member of the Central Intelligence Agency, wrote: "Our diplomats and intelligence officers' fears of Zionist influence are great...."

Mearsheimer and Walt have collected and quoted some of the lobbyists' comments on their organizations' political capital. For example, Mearsheimer and Walt quote Morris Amitay, former AIPAC director as saying, "It's almost politically suicidal...for a member of Congress who wants to seek reelection to take any stand that might be interpreted as anti-policy of the conservative Israeli government." They also quote a Michael Massing article in which an unnamed staffer sympathetic to Israel said, "We can count on well over half the House – 250 to 300 members – to do reflexively whatever AIPAC wants." Similarly they cite former AIPAC official Steven Rosen illustrating AIPAC's power for Jeffrey Goldberg by putting a napkin in front of him and saying, "In twenty-four hours, we could have the signatures of seventy senators on this napkin."

Mitchell Bard has conducted a study which attempts to roughly quantify the influence of the Israel lobby on 782 policy decisions, over the period of 1945 to 1984, in order to move the debate on its influence away from simple anecdotes. He

found the Israeli lobby won; that is, achieved its policy objective, 60 percent of the time. The most important variable was the president's position. When the president supported the lobby, it won 95 percent of the time. At first glance it appears the lobby was only successful because its objectives coincided with those of the president, but the lobby's influence was demonstrated by the fact that it still won 27 percent of the cases when the president opposed its position.

However, some U.S. government officials and journalists have stated that the Israel lobby is not so powerful that they control U.S. foreign policy.

Progressive journalist John R. MacArthur wrote:

Somehow... I can't shake the idea that the Israel lobby, no matter how powerful, isn't all it is cracked up to be, particularly where it concerns the Bush administrations past and present. Indeed, when I think of pernicious foreign lobbies with disproportionate sway over American politics, I can't see past Saudi Arabia and its royal house, led by King Abdullah.

Former Secretary of State George Shultz stated "the notion that U.S. policy on Israel and Middle East is the result of [the Israel lobby's] influence is simply wrong." Dennis B. Ross, a Jewish-American diplomat and special Middle East coordinator under Bill Clinton, who is now an official at WINEP, wrote:

never in the time that I led the American negotiations on the Middle East peace process did we take a step because 'the lobby' wanted us to. Nor did we shy away from one because 'the lobby' opposed it. That is not to say that AIPAC and others have no influence. They do. But they don't distort U.S. policy or undermine American interests.

Individual journalists each have their own opinions on how powerful the Israel lobby is. Glenn Frankel wrote: "On Capitol Hill the Israel lobby commands large majorities in both the House and Senate." Michael Lind produced a cover piece on the Israel lobby for the UK publication Prospect in 2002 which concluded, "The truth about America's Israel lobby is this: it is not all-powerful, but it is still far too powerful for the good of the U.S. and its alliances in the Middle East and elsewhere." Tony Judt, writing in The New York Times, asked rhetorically, "Does the Israel Lobby affect our foreign policy choices? Of course – that is one of its goals. ... But does pressure to support Israel distort American decisions? That's a matter of judgment."

According to a public opinion poll by Zogby International of 1,036 likely voters from October 10–12, 2006, 40% of American voters at least somewhat believe the Israel lobby has been a key factor in going to war in Iraq. The following poll question was used: "Question: Do you strongly agree, somewhat agree, somewhat disagree, or strongly disagree that the work of the Israel lobby on Congress and the Bush administration has been a key factor for going to war in Iraq and now confronting Iran?"

In March 2009, Charles W. Freeman, Jr., criticized the lobby after withdrawing his candidacy for the chair of the National Intelligence Council. Freeman said, "The libels on me and their easily traceable email trails show conclusively that there is a powerful lobby determined to prevent any view other than its own from being aired. ... The tactics of the Israel Lobby plumb the depths of dishonor and indecency.... The aim of this Lobby is control of the policy process. ... " Members of Congress denied that the Israel lobby had a significant role in their opposition to Freeman's appointment; they cite Freeman's ties with the Saudi and Chinese governments, objections to certain statements made about the Palestinian territories and his lack of experience as the reasons for their opposition.

Upon his resignation, the National Counterterrorism Center Director Joe Kent cited the "powerful lobby" of Israel as the cause of the 2026 Iran war. Foreign Policy suggested that the Israel lobby in the US was a major enabler of the 2026 war because of its foreign policy influence leading to increasingly hostile relations between Iran and the United States and the encouragement of regional aggression by Israel under its prime minister Benjamin Netanyahu. In particular, The Forward also blamed the Israel lobby for setting the foreign policy path to the war, singling out AIPAC.

=== Comparison to other lobbies ===
The closest comparison is probably to other ethnic-group based lobbies that attempt to influence American foreign policy decisions such as the Cuban-American lobby, the African-American lobby in foreign policy and the Armenian American lobby, although the lobby has also been compared to the National Rifle Association (NRA) and the lobby for the Pharmaceutical industry. In comparing the Israel Lobby to the NRA, Glenn Frankel concludes, "Nevertheless, the Israel lobby, and AIPAC in particular, gained a reputation as the National Rifle Association of foreign policy: a hard-edged, pugnacious bunch that took names and kept score. But in some ways it was even stronger. The NRA's support was largely confined to right-wing Republicans and rural Democrats. But AIPAC made inroads in both parties and both ends of the ideological spectrum."

Zunes describes that some groups who lobby against current U.S. policy on Israel "have accepted funding from autocratic Arab regimes, thereby damaging their credibility" while others have "taken hard-line positions that not only oppose the Israeli occupation but challenge Israel's very right to exist and are therefore not taken seriously by most policymakers." Zunes writes that many lobbying groups on the left, such as Peace Action, are "more prone to complain about the power of the Israel lobby and its affiliated PACs than to do serious lobbying on this issue or condition its own PAC contributions on support for a more moderate U.S. policy" in the region. Noam Chomsky, political activist and professor of linguistics at MIT, writes, "there are far more powerful interests that have a stake in what happens in the Persian Gulf region than does AIPAC [or the Lobby generally], such as the oil companies, the arms industry and other special interests whose lobbying influence and campaign contributions far surpass that of the much-vaunted Zionist lobby and its allied donors to congressional races."

However, while comparing the Israel Lobby with the Arab Lobby, Mitchell Bard notes, "From the beginning, the Arab lobby has faced not only a disadvantage in electoral politics but also in organization. There are several politically oriented groups, but many of these are one man operations with little financial or popular support." The Arab American Institute is involved in supporting Arab-American political candidates, but, according to journalist and comedian Ray Hanania in a 2006 piece, "it's nothing compared to the funds that AIPAC raises not just for Jewish American congressmen, but for congressmen who support Israel." Furthermore, according to Bard, Arab-American lobbies face a problem of motivation; while Jewish Americans feel the need to support their homeland, Israel (as well as other states in the Middle East who have signed peace treaties with Israel) in active, organized ways, Arab-Americans do not appear to have a similar motivation when it comes to their own homelands.

=== Israel and U.S. interests ===
Friendly relations between Israel and the U.S. has been and continues to be a tenet of both American and Israeli foreign policy. Israel receives bipartisan support in the U.S. Congress. The Israeli Ministry of Foreign Affairs states that U.S. and Israel share common "economic, political, strategic, and diplomatic concerns" and that the countries exchange "intelligence and military information" and cooperate in an effort to halt "international terrorism" and illegal drug trade. Furthermore, a majority of American citizens view Israel unfavorably.

In 2011, the pro-Israel Washington Institute for Near East Policy (WINEP) argued that the U.S.-Israel relationship is "A Strategic Asset for the United States". In discussing their report, Walter B. Slocombe said that while in the popular imagination, the U.S.-Israel relationship is only good for Israel, Israel provides enormous assistance to the United States, including military expertise which has saved American lives in Iraq and Afghanistan. Robert D. Blackwill countered the claim that the U.S.-Israel relationship significantly damages the relationship between the United States and the Arab world. He asked rhetorically:

[W]ould Saudi Arabia's policies toward the United States be markedly different in practice if Washington entered into a sustained crisis with Israel over the Palestine issue during which the bilateral relationship went into steep systemic decline? Would Riyadh lower the price of oil? Would it stop hedging its regional bets concerning U.S. attempts to coerce Iran into freezing its nuclear weapons programs? Would it regard current U.S. policy toward Afghanistan more positively? Would it view American democracy promotion in the Middle East more favorably? Would it be more inclined to reform its internal governmental processes to be more in line with U.S. preferences? We judge positive answers to all these questions as "doubtful" at the very least.

When asked how this report could so flatly contradict the Walt and Mearsheimer thesis, Slocombe responded, "There is so much error in the world," and added, "I think it would be interesting to ask them whether they make the same contrary argument about the other countries to whom we also provide something like this kind of support. There are obviously differences, but the principle is the same."

The Israel Project noted in 2009, "when you're talking to Americans, you need to know that when you don't support a two-state solution you risk having a major public relations challenge in America and Europe."

In a 2008 editorial, the Israeli-American historian and author Michael B. Oren wrote that Israel and the United States are natural allies, despite what the opposition from "much of American academia and influential segments of the media". Oren claimed this was because Israel and the United States shared similar values such as "respect for civic rights and the rule of law" and democracy. Israel and the United States share military intelligence in order to fight "terrorism". Oren also noted, "more than 70% of [Americans], according to recent polls, favor robust ties with the Jewish state."

In his 2007 review of Mearsheimer and Walt's book, Jeffrey Goldberg wrote:

Forty years of polling has consistently shown that Americans support Israel in its conflict with the Arabs.... Both Israel and America were founded by refugees from European religious intolerance; both are rooted in a common religious tradition; Israel is a lively democracy in a part of the world that lacks democracy; Israelis seem self-reliant in the manner of American pioneers; and Israel's enemies, in many cases, seem to be America's enemies as well.

The Israeli academic and political activist Jeff Halper said, "Israel is able to pursue its occupation only because of its willingness to serve Western (mainly U.S.) imperial interests" and that rather than influencing the United States via the lobby, Israel is actually "a handmaiden of American Empire". According to political scientists John Mearsheimer and Stephen Walt, though, "the combination of unwavering U.S. support for Israel and the related effort to spread democracy throughout the region has inflamed Arab and Islamic opinion and jeopardized U.S. security." They alleged that while "one might assume that the bond between the two countries is based on shared strategic interests or compelling moral imperatives. ... neither of those explanations can account for the remarkable level of material and diplomatic support that the United States provides to Israel." Robert Satloff cited the events of May–June 2010 (in which Israel stopped a flotilla meant to break its blockade of the Gaza Strip and yet, a few days later, every country expected to vote U.N. sanctions against Iran ended up voting as the U.S. wanted them to) as a counter-example that disproved that point of view. Goldberg similarly cited the Arab Spring to counter Walt and Mearsheimer's point:

It seems as if the Arab masses have been much less upset about Israel's treatment of the Palestinians than they have been about their own treatment at the hands of their unelected leaders. If Israel ceased to exist tomorrow, Arabs would still be upset at the quality of their leadership (and they would still blame the United States for supporting the autocrats who make them miserable); Iran would still continue its drive to expunge American influence from the Middle East; and al Qaeda would still seek to murder Americans and other Westerners.

In 2006 the former U.N. weapons inspector in Iraq Scott Ritter published "Target Iran: The Truth About the White House's Plans for Regime Change" (ISBN 978-1-56025-936-7). In his book he stated that certain Israelis and pro-Israel elements in the United States were trying to push the Bush administration into war with Iran. He also accuses the U.S. pro-Israel lobby of dual loyalty and outright espionage (see Lawrence Franklin espionage scandal).

In 2020 Imran Khan, then the prime minister of Pakistan, said the United States was pressuring Pakistan to recognize Israel and said it was because of "Israel's deep impact in the United States". Khan also said "Israel's lobby is the most powerful, and that's why America's whole Middle East policy is controlled by Israel,"

==== Plans to avoid the Foreign Agents Registration Act ====
Leaked documents from the Justice Ministry of Israel show that Israeli officials were considering creating an American nonprofit that would be used to carry on their advocacy activities in the United States while avoiding the Foreign Agents Registration Act.

=== News media coverage of the Israel lobby ===
American journalist Michael Massing argues that there is a lack of news media coverage of the Israel lobby, and posits this explanation: "Why the blackout? For one thing, reporting on these groups is not easy. AIPAC's power makes potential sources reluctant to discuss the organization on the record, and employees who leave it usually sign pledges of silence. AIPAC officials themselves rarely give interviews, and the organization even resists divulging its board of directors." Massing writes that in addition to AIPAC's efforts to maintain a low profile, "journalists, meanwhile, are often loath to write about the influence of organized Jewry. ... In the end, though, the main obstacle to covering these groups is fear."

Steven Rosen, a former director of foreign-policy issues for AIPAC, said to Jeffrey Goldberg of The New Yorker, "a lobby is like a night flower: it thrives in the dark and dies in the sun."

According to Gal Beckerman of Columbia Journalism Review, there are many individual pro-Israel op-ed columnists but the argument that the media as a whole is part of the Israel lobby cannot be concluded from this, as non pro-Israel writers such as John Mearsheimer and Stephen Walt are not censored.

Walt and Mearsheimer undermine our intelligence by assuming that we are simply being manipulated. ... If the lobby is so influential over the media, how were Walt and Mearsheimer given such space in every major news outlet in the country to express their 'dangerous' views? You want to tell me that a force that can impel us to got [sic] to war in Iraq can't find a way to censor two academics? Not much of a lobby, now is it?

Beckerman cites examples of op-eds critical of Israel from several major U.S. newspapers and concludes that an equally compelling argument could be made that the Israel lobby doesn't control the media.

Itamar Rabinovich, writing for the Brookings Institution, wrote, "The truth of the matter is that, insofar as the lobby ever tries to intimidate and silence, the effort usually causes more damage than it redresses. In any event, the power of the lobby to do that is very modest."

On The Diane Rehm Show (December 11, 2006), the Middle East expert Hisham Melhem, a Lebanese journalist and Washington Bureau Chief for Al Arabiya, and Dennis Ross of Washington Institute for Near East Policy (WINEP), asked about Israeli influence on American foreign policy in the Middle East, mentioned in the former president Jimmy Carter's 2006 book Palestine: Peace Not Apartheid said: [H. Melhem] "When it comes to Israel [discussing Israeli and/or Jewish American issues], it is still almost a taboo in certain parts, not everywhere ... there are certain things that cannot be said about the Israeli government or America's relationship with Israel or about the Israeli lobby. Yes there is, excuse me, there is an Israeli lobby, but when we say an Israeli lobby we are not talking about a Jewish cabal. The Israeli lobby operates the way the NRA operates, a system of rewards and punishment, you help your friends by money, by advocacy and everything, and sometimes they pool money in to the campaigns of those people that they see as friendly to Israel. This is the American game". (radio interview: ≈16:30–20:05)

=== Criticism of the term ===
According to William Safire, the term "Israel Lobby" came into use in the 1970s and, similar to the term "China lobby", carries "the pejorative connotation of manipulation". He also writes that supporters of Israel gauge the degree of perceived animus towards the Jewish State by the term chosen to refer to the lobby: "pro-Israel lobby" being used by those with the mildest opposition, followed by "Israel lobby", with the term "Jewish lobby" being employed by those with the most extreme anti-Israel opinions.

According to Walt and Mearsheimer, "Using the term 'Israel lobby' is itself somewhat misleading ... One might more accurately dub this the 'pro-Israel community' ..." since this is not the lobby of a foreign country, rather, it is composed of Americans. However, justifying their usage of the term, they write "because many of the key [pro-Israel] groups do lobby, and because the term 'Israel lobby' is used in common parlance (along with labels such as the 'farm lobby', 'insurance lobby', 'gun lobby' and other ethnic lobbies), we have chosen to employ it here."

== See also ==
- American Jews in politics
- Anti-Israel lobby in the United States
- Arab lobby in the United States
- Public diplomacy of Israel
- The Lobby (TV series)
- Lobbying in the United States
- Egypt lobby in the United States
- Jewish lobby
- Libya lobby in the United States
- Pro-Palestine lobby in the United States
- Pakistan lobby in the United States
- Saudi Arabia lobby in the United States
- Turkey lobby in the United States
- Diaspora politics in the United States
- Ethnic interest groups in the United States
- Israel lobby in the United Kingdom
- Israel lobby in Canada
- Israel lobby in Australia
- Track AIPAC, a website that purports to track political donations from the Israel lobby
