= Brit Shalom =

Brit Shalom may be:

- Brit shalom (naming ceremony), an alternative ritual to traditional brit milah
- Brit Tzedek v'Shalom, an American Jewish political organisation
- Congregation Brit Shalom, former name of Temple Covenant of Peace, a Reform synagogue in Easton, Pennsylvania
- Brit Shalom (political organization), a now defunct group that wanted peaceful coexistence between Arabs and Jews
