= Brit Tzedek v'Shalom =

American Jewish political pressure group

- Founder: Marcia Freedman
- Dissolved: September 2009
- Merger of: Merged into J Street
- Type: Jewish peace advocacy organization
- Purpose: Advocacy for a negotiated two-state solution to the Israeli–Palestinian conflict
- Headquarters: United States
- Members: 48,000 (claimed)
- Affiliations: Americans for Peace Now; Israel Policy Forum
- Website: btvshalom.org

Brit Tzedek v'Shalom, also known as Jewish Alliance for Justice and Peace, was an organization of American Jews and describes its members as "deeply committed to Israel's well-being through the achievement of a negotiated settlement to the long-standing Israeli–Palestinian conflict". They describe this as "necessitating an end to Israel's occupation of land acquired during the 1967 war and an end to Palestinian terrorism". The group endorses a two-state solution to the conflict. The founding president of this organization is Marcia Freedman.

In 2006, the group collaborated with Americans for Peace Now (APN) and the Israel Policy Forum (IPF) to advocate against the Palestinian Anti-Terrorism Act, supported by the American Israel Public Affairs Committee (AIPAC). The bill eventually became law, but in a form that was quite different from the original language proposed by AIPAC.

By 2008, efforts to combine IPF, APN, and Brit Tzedek into a single dovish Jewish group went dormant.

Compared to the other dovish Jewish groups, Brit Tzedek developed a massive grassroots operation, claiming 48,000 volunteers in the United States. Brit Tzedek's operations merged into J Street in September 2009, one of several strategic acquisitions by J Street. Brit Tzedek would become J Street's field operations branch. At that time, Brit Tzedek's budget was less than $900,000 with a staff of five people.

== See also ==
- Jewish Voice for Peace
- Americans for Peace Now
- Partners for Progressive Israel
