= 2017 United States–Saudi Arabia arms deal =

Saudi–American relations

- Saudi Arabia: United States

On May 20, 2017, President Donald Trump of the United States and King Salman bin Abdulaziz of Saudi Arabia signed a series of letters of intent for Saudi Arabia to purchase arms from the United States totaling US$110 billion immediately, and $350 billion over 10 years. The intended purchases include tanks, combat ships, missile defense systems, as well as radar, communications and cybersecurity technology. The transfer was widely seen as a counterbalance against the influence of Iran in the region and a "significant" and "historic" expansion of United States relations with Saudi Arabia.

== Background ==
Saudi Arabia is a key U.S. ally in the Middle East. Saudi Arabia's security forces have relied on U.S. equipment, training, and service support for decades, officially as a counterbalance to Iranian military influence in the region, and to help protect the Kingdom from extremist attacks. Between 2011 and 2015, Saudi Arabia was the destination for nearly 10% of all U.S. arms exports. In 2016, the Obama administration proposed a series of arms deals worth $115 billion, including warships, helicopters, and maintenance. However, some parts of this deal were blocked by the administration in December 2016 after Saudi Arabia's airstrikes and targeting procedures in neighboring Yemen drew controversy. After Saudi warplanes targeted a funeral in Yemen's capital Sanaa, killing more than 140 people, the Obama administration announced its intention to review U.S. military assistance to Saudi Arabia.

The 2017 deal was partially created with the help of Jared Kushner, son-in-law of and senior advisor to President Trump; Kushner had cultivated relationships with Saudi royalty during the transition and personally contacted Lockheed Martin during the deal-making process.

== Details ==
The signing occurred at the Riyadh summit, and was part of Trump's 2017 series of visits to the Vatican, Saudi Arabia and Israel. It also was related to a $20 billion investment in mostly American infrastructure.

Saudi Arabia signed billions of dollars of deals with U.S. companies in the arms industry and petroleum industry, including Lockheed Martin, Boeing, Raytheon, General Dynamics, Northrop Grumman, General Electric, ExxonMobil, Halliburton, Honeywell, McDermott International, Jacobs Solutions, National Oilwell Varco, Nabors Industries, Weatherford International, Schlumberger and Dow Chemical.

Saudi Arabia joined the Blackstone Group in May 2017 in a $40 billion fund to invest in stateside infrastructure projects.

== American and Saudi Arabian government statements ==
The White House hailed the deal as a "significant expansion" of the two nations' "security relationships". The United States Secretary of State Rex Tillerson described the deal as "historic" and said that it would counter Iran, and urged them to halt support of destabilizing forces in the Middle East, although he hinted the United States would be open to discussions.

In December 2018, the Senators in the US voted to end American military assistance for Saudi Arabia's war in Yemen. The 56-to-41 vote came after the controversial killing of journalist Jamal Khashoggi and thousands of civilian casualties in Yemen. Senator Bernie Sanders, who co-wrote the resolution, said it is the first time Congress had used the law to make clear "that the constitutional responsibility for making war rests with the United States Congress, not the White House. Today, we tell the despotic regime in Saudi Arabia that we will not be part of their military adventurism."

Trump vetoed a resolution on April 16, 2019 that would have ended American support of Saudi Arabia's war with Yemen.

On July 24, 2019, Trump vetoed three bills that were meant to stop billions of dollars of arms to Saudi Arabia.

On September 24, 2020, the Democratic Party introduced a legislation to control the United States foreign arms sales. The legislation was introduced while Trump administration was in discussions, led by Jared Kushner, about the possible sale of F-35s to the UAE. In the past the Trump administration has sold billions of dollars' worth of weapons to Gulf allies Saudi Arabia and the United Arab Emirates, during their active involvement in the Yemen civil war.

On November 18, 2020, three US senators namely, Democratic Senators Bob Menendez and Chris Murphy and Republican Senator Rand Paul announced four separate resolutions in disagreement of President Donald Trump's plan to sell more than $23 billion worth of Reaper drones, F-35 fighter aircraft and air-to-air missiles and other munitions to the UAE.

== Reception ==
=== Domestic response ===
Tulsi Gabbard—a Democratic Representative from Hawaii—criticized the move, saying that "Saudi Arabia is a country with a devastating record of human rights violations at home and abroad and has a long history of providing support to terrorist organizations that threaten the American people". Rand Paul introduced a bill to try to block the plan calling it a "travesty".

US defense stocks reached all-time highs after the announcement.

Senator John McCain told Al Jazeera: "The Saudis are in a war in Yemen and they need weapons. You want to win, you need weapons. We are in a war." According to Senator Chris Murphy, "That $110 billion is a mix of old sales and future prospective sales that have not been announced or signed."

=== International response ===
- Iran: Supreme Leader Ali Khamenei called Saudi Arabia a "cow being milked" by the United States.
- Israel: Yuval Steinitz, Minister of National Infrastructures, Energy, and Water Resources, expressed "concern".
- Saudi Arabia: The Government of Saudi Arabia praised the deal, and it stated that it is a turning point in Saudi–American relations.
- Yemen: More than 10,000 Yemeni people protested the deal in Sana'a. Houthis fired a ballistic missile toward the Saudi capital Riyadh.

== Impact ==
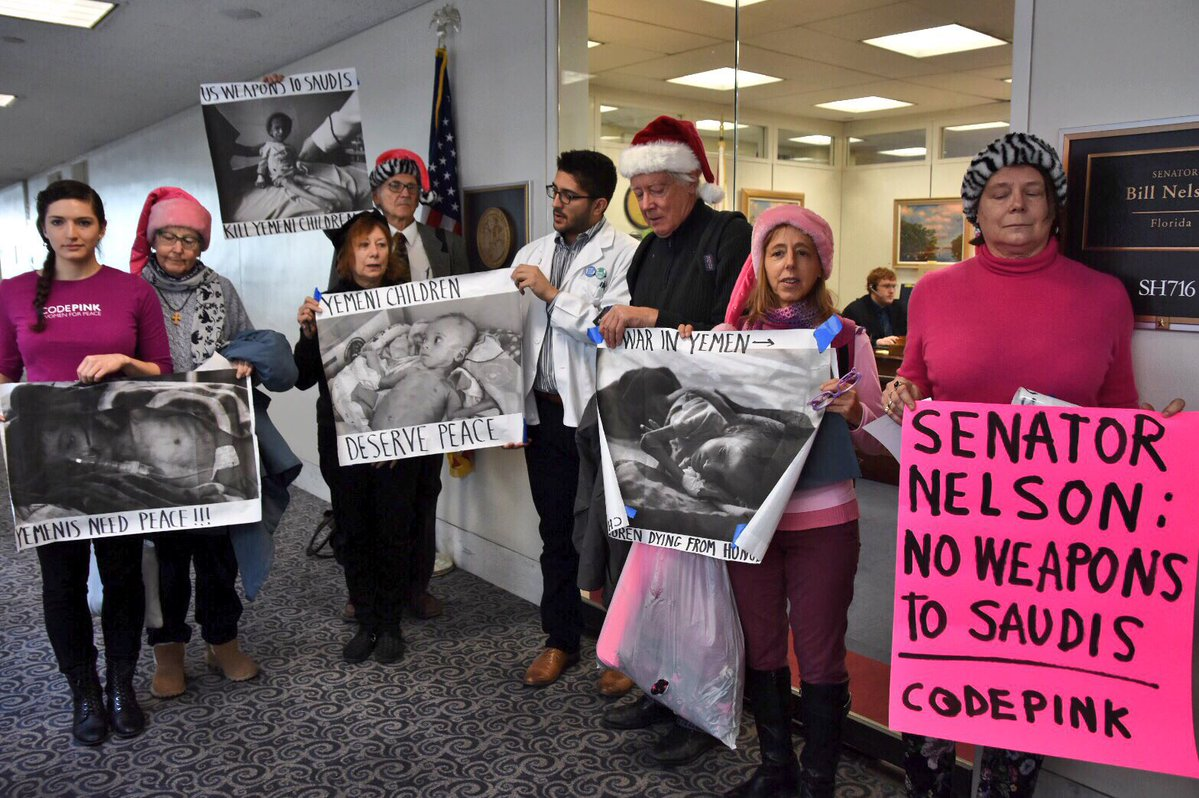
Code Pink protesting senators supporting Saudi arms deal, December 2017

On June 5, 2017, Bruce Reidel of the Brookings Institution wrote that the arms deal consisted of "a bunch of letters of interest or intent, but not contracts." On June 13, the United States Senate narrowly rejected an effort to block part of deal and approved the sale of $500 million worth of American weapons. The approval of the deal was opposed by various lawmakers, including GOP Senators Mike Lee, Rand Paul, Todd Young and Dean Heller, along with most Democratic Senators who voted to advance the measure in order to block the sale, citing the human rights violations by Saudi Arabia in the Yemeni Civil War and human rights violations at home. Among the senators who voted against moving the measure to block the sale were Democrats Joe Donnelly, Claire McCaskill, Bill Nelson, Joe Manchin and Mark Warner along with Republicans including Majority Leader Mitch McConnell, Bob Corker and John McCain.

In August 2018, a laser-guided Mark 82 bomb sold by the U.S. and built by Lockheed Martin was used in the Saudi-led coalition airstrike on a school bus in Yemen, which killed 51 people, including 40 children. Following the civilian casualties in Yemen by the airstrikes conducted by Saudi Arabia, the U.S. suggested putting gun cameras on Saudi and Emirati warplanes to see how strikes were being conducted, but the proposal was rejected by both the Saudis and the UAE. U.S. military officials posted at the coalition war room in Riyadh brought to notice that inexperienced Saudi pilots were flying the warplanes at high altitude to avoid enemy fire, but in turn were putting civilians in danger due to inaccurate bombings.

Through October 2018, the Saudi government had purchased $14.5 billion of arms.

During 2018, Trump made several assertions of how many American jobs the deal would create, including as many as 1,000,000.

In August of 2022 Biden's State Department approved $3 billion sale of Patriot missiles to Saudi Arabia and $2.2 billion to the United Arab Emirates despite pledging in 2019 campaign to make Saudi Arabia a pariah.

In August 2024, the Biden administration partially lifted the three-year ban on US arms sales to Saudi Arabia.

According to a 2025 report by the Stimson Center, realized transactions were much lower than the publisized figures.

== See also ==
- US–Saudi Arabia AWACS Sale
- United States Military Training Mission
- Al-Yamamah arms deal
