= Zunes =

Zunes may refer to:

- Zune, a digital media brand owned by Microsoft
- Stephen Zunes (born 1956), an international relations scholar
