= UPZ =

- University of Prizren (UPZ), a public university in Kosovo.
- Union of Progressive Zionists (UPZ) was a North American network of Jewish student activists
- UPZ as in Teusaquillo, UPZ Parque Central is one of three UPZ in which Simón Bolívar is contained
- UPZ - lexical abbreviation for work by Ulrich Wilcken, Urkunden der Ptolemäerzeit: I. Papyri aus Unterägypten, Berlin & Leipzig 1922; 11. Papyri aus Oberägypten, Berlin 1935–57.
