= J Street =

American nonprofit liberal Zionist advocacy group

- Founded: November 29, 2007; 18 years ago
- Founder: Jeremy Ben-Ami
- Type: 501(c)(4) organization
- Tax ID no.: 26-1507828
- Purpose: Liberal Zionism; Two-state solution Israeli–Palestinian conflict
- Location: Washington, D.C.
- Region served: Israel; United States
- Method: Lobbying
- Executive Director: Jeremy Ben-Ami
- Chairman: Morton Halperin
- Key people: Daniel Levy (advisor); Debra DeLee (advisor); Shlomo Ben-Ami (advisor); Lincoln Chafee (advisor)
- Subsidiaries: J Street Education Fund, J Street PAC
- Revenue: $3.18 million (2024)
- Expenses: $3.38 million (2024)
- Website: jstreet.org

J Street Education Fund
- Tax ID no.: 20-2777557
- Legal status: 501(c)(3) organization
- President: Jeremy Ben-Ami
- Chairman: Morton Halperin
- Revenue: $8.75 million (2023)
- Expenses: $8.12 million (2023)

J Street (Hebrew: ג'יי סטריט) is an American nonprofit liberal Zionist advocacy and lobby group based in the United States whose aims include strengthening Jewish democracy in Israel, promoting a diplomatic end to the Israeli–Palestinian conflict with a two-state solution, and opposing the Boycott, Divestment and Sanctions movement.

J Street describes itself as "the political home for pro-Israel, pro-peace Americans who want Israel to be secure, democratic and the national home of the Jewish people". Many right-wing and Zionist critics allege that J Street and the policies they support are anti-Israel. At the same time, Left-wing and anti-Zionist movements criticize J Street's positions supporting Zionism and aid to Israel, its rejection of Boycott, Divestment and Sanctions and human rights organizations' allegations of a Gaza genocide, and past efforts against Palestinian statehood.

== Etymology ==
J Street, as an American lobby organization aimed at Washington leaders and policymakers, derived its name from the alphabetically named street plan of Washington, D.C.: J Street is missing from the grid (the street naming jumps from I Street to K Street because until the mid-19th century, the letters "I" and "J" were indistinguishable when written).

Also, by association, the letter J is a reference to "Jewish". Further, K Street is a street in downtown Washington on which many influential lobbying firms are located, and that become synonymous for Washington's formidable lobbying establishment. Consequently, the choice of the name reflects the desire of J Street's founders and donors to bring a message to Washington that, metaphorically like the missing "J Street" of the D.C. grid, has thus far been absent.

== Political vision ==
J Street's stated aim is to provide a political home for pro-Israel, pro-peace Americans who believe that a "two-state solution to the Israeli-Palestinian conflict is essential to Israel's survival as the national home of the Jewish people and as a vibrant democracy". J Street strongly opposes Boycott, Divestment and Sanctions.

According to its executive director, Jeremy Ben-Ami, J Street is proud of AIPAC's accomplishments, but the two groups have different priorities rather than different views. Explaining the need for a new lobbying group, Ben-Ami stated: "Israel's interests will be best served when the United States makes it a major foreign policy priority to help Israel achieve a real and lasting peace...." Alan Solomont, one of the founders of J Street and a former national finance chair of the Democratic National Committee (DNC), described the need for J Street in the following way: "We have heard the voices of neocons, and right-of-center Jewish leaders and Christian evangelicals, and the mainstream views of the American Jewish community have not been heard." During its first conference, Ben-Ami said, "The party and the viewpoint that we're closest to in Israeli politics is actually Kadima." According to Peter Frey, a financier and chairman of J Street's board, "J Street is a Zionist organization, It's 'pro-Israel, pro-peace' — it starts with 'pro-Israel.'"

The Washington Post described the perceived differences between J Street and AIPAC: "While both groups call themselves bipartisan, AIPAC has won support from an overwhelming majority of Republican Jews, while J Street is presenting itself as an alternative for Democrats who have grown uncomfortable with both Netanyahu's policies and the conservatives' flocking to AIPAC."

In 2011, J Street opposed recognizing Palestine as an independent state at the United Nations. J Street endorsed the nuclear disarmament deal with Iran, which Obama supported and Netanyahu and AIPAC opposed. In 2016 the political focus of J Street was to unseat Republican senators who led U.S. Congressional opposition to the Iran deal.

=== 23-state solution ===
Following the Gaza War, J Street proposed a "23-state solution" that would involve the normalization of relations between Israel and 22 Arab nations. The plan would include rebuilding Gaza, reunifying Gaza and the West Bank, establishing a Palestinian state, and normalizing relations between Sunni states and Israel. In its roadmap, J Street emphasized its views that Hamas should disarm, Israel's annexation of the West Bank should be reversed, and the Palestinian Authority should be "strengthened."

== Structure ==
J Street logo, 2007–2016

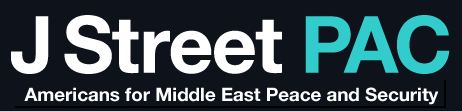
J Street PAC logo, 2007–2016

J Street PAC logo since 2016

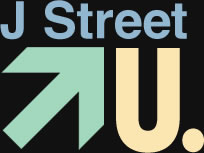
J Street U logo, 2007–2016

J Street U logo since 2016

J Street and J Street PAC, founded in April 2008, exist as separate legal entities with different political functions. The J Street Education Fund joined the J Street family of organizations in 2009:

- J Street – a 501(c)(4) nonprofit advocacy group which aims to "support strong American leadership to end the Arab-Israeli and Palestinian-Israeli conflicts peacefully and diplomatically".
- The J Street PAC – a political action committee for political and financial support to candidates seeking election who agree with J Street's goals.
- The J Street Education Fund, Inc. – a 501(c)(3) charitable organization for education about a two-state solution to the Israeli-Palestinian conflict, and to advance a liberal Zionist vision for a Jewish democratic state.
- J Street U (formerly Union of Progressive Zionists) – the student organizing arm of J Street, with chapters on university and college campuses.

J Street's founding executive director is Jeremy Ben-Ami, a former domestic policy adviser in the Clinton Administration.

J Street's advisory council consists of former public officials, policy experts, community leaders and academics, including Bruce Alperts, former president of the National Academy of Sciences; Paige Alexander, CEO of the Carter Center; Ivo Daalder, former United States ambassador to NATO; Suzanne Lerner, co-founder and CEO of Michael Stars; and Rabbi Susan Leider of Sacramento, California.

J Street's rabbinic cabinet consists of North American rabbis, cantors and cantorial students. The group is co-chaired by Rabbis Fred Reeves, Yohanna Ginberg, Sharon Kleinbaum and Marc Israel.

J Street announced in September 2026 a new Jewish Community Advisory Council to include former leaders of traditional Jewish establishment organizations. The new council comes as many Democratic politicians and young Jews are moving away from support of Israel due to that country’s actions during its war with Hamas in Gaza. “We want to ensure that there’s a Democratic Party that adheres to the J Street line, that does not negate the right of the Jewish people to a state, but does oppose what the Jewish state is doing,” said the group’s president, Jeremy Ben-Ami. The council’s members include Alan Solow and Seymour Reich, both past chairmen of the Conference of Presidents of Major American Jewish Organizations; Nancy Kaufman, former CEO of the National Council of Jewish Women; and Rabbi Eric Yoffie, former president of the Union for Reform Judaism.

== Activities ==
=== Political fundraising ===
The J Street PAC acts as a traditional political action committee raising funds to support a limited number of candidates for Senate and Congressional races. J Street lobbies for and against Israel-related bills and legislation.

For the 2008 Congressional elections, the J Street PAC raised $600,000 and, according to J Street, 33 of the 41 candidates it backed won their seats.

J Street's first-year budget for fiscal 2009 was $1.5 million. This is a modest figure for a PAC, though Gary Kamiya writes that J Street hopes to raise significant money online, following the blueprint of MoveOn and the Barack Obama presidential campaign.

In 2010, J Street PAC endorsed 61 candidates—3 for the Senate and 58 for the House. 45 of the PAC's candidates won. The J Street PAC distributed over $1.5 million to its candidates, more than any other pro-Israel PAC in the two-year cycle.

Confidential IRS documents obtained by The Washington Times in 2010 showed that George Soros had been a donor to J Street since 2008. The approximately $750,000 from Soros and his family, together with donations from Hong Kong-based businesswoman Consolacion Esdicul, amounted to about 15% of J Street's funding in its early years. In previous statements and on its web site J Street had seemed to deny receiving support from foreign interests and from Soros, a bête noire to conservatives. Jeremy Ben-Ami apologized for earlier "misleading" statements regarding funding from Soros. Ben-Ami also clarified that donors to 501(c)(4) organizations are promised confidentiality by law and challenged critics to make public the contributors to opposing organizations. Rabbi Steve Gutow, a president of the Jewish Council for Public Affairs, called J Street "irresponsible" for its handling of the issue.

In the 2014 election cycle, J Street PAC contributed over $2.4 million to its 95 endorsed candidates, the most in history by a pro-Israel PAC.

In the 2016 election cycle, J Street PAC distributed $3.6 million to its 124 endorsed candidates, and not a single incumbent Iran deal supporter was unseated by a deal detractor.

Critics have pointed out that according to Federal Election Commission filings in 2009, dozens of Arab and Muslim Americans and Iranian advocacy organizations donated tens of thousands of dollars to J Street, representing "a small fraction" of the group's fund-raising. Donors included Lebanese-American businessman Richard Abdoo, who is a board member of Amideast and a former board member of the Arab American Institute, and Genevieve Lynch, who is also a member of the National Iranian American Council board. More than 20% of the citizens of Israel are Arab, most of whom are Muslim.

In September 2026, the J Street Action Fund said it would put $3 million toward an advertising campaign. The ads are aimed at opposing five Republican candidates supported by the American Israel Public Affairs Committee (AIPAC): Mike Collins, Max Miller, Derrick Van Orden, Ryan Mackenzie, and Mariannette Miller-Meeks. Axios reported that the campaign was the largest amount of spending by a super PAC in J Street's history and underscored the increasing electoral competition between the two groups.

=== Other projects and activities ===
In July 2010 J Street supported the construction of the Cordoba House cultural center and mosque near the World Trade Center site in New York. President Jeremy Ben-Ami released a statement saying: "The Muslim community has an equal right to build a community center wherever it is legal to do so."

In September 2010, J Street started a project "They Don't Speak For Us", which criticizes the Emergency Committee for Israel, a right-wing advocacy group created by William Kristol and Gary Bauer.

In May 2012, a J Street delegation visited Palestinian Authority president Mahmoud Abbas, headed by Executive Director Jeremy Ben-Ami.

In November 2012, J Street lobbied the U.S. Senate against a group of bills that would have penalized the Palestinian National Authority if it used its recently elevated status of "observer" at the United Nations to bring international charges against Israel.

During the 2023–present Gaza war, J Street U led efforts against both right-wing Zionism and left-wing anti-Zionism on college campuses, including by rejecting the platforming of officials affiliated with the Netanyahu administration as well as calls for boycotts, divestments, and sanctions against Israel. Simultaneously, J Street U has led talks promoting a two-state solution aligned with a liberal Zionist vision for Jewish democracy in Israel. J Street U has eschewed calls for an Israeli, Palestinian, or binational one-state solution, while defending the civil rights of student protestors, such as those involved in the pro-Palestinian encampment movement.

In November 2024, J Street supported Senate resolutions introduced by Bernie Sanders to block U.S. arm sales to Israel.

On August 3, 2025, J-Street founder Ben-Ami wrote on his Substack, "Until now, I have tried to deflect and defend when challenged to call this genocide. I have, however, been persuaded rationally by legal and scholarly arguments that international courts will one day find that Israel has broken the international genocide convention", marking a potential shift in J Street's position.

== Relationship with Israeli and U.S. governments ==
According to Nathan Guttman, "J Street and its supporters have never made a secret of their opposition to Netanyahu and his policies." On October 22, 2009, then-opposition leader of the Knesset, Tzipi Livni, sent a letter congratulating J Street on its inaugural event. She said she would not be able to attend but that Kadima would be "well represented" by Meir Sheetrit, Shlomo Molla, and Haim Ramon.

The Israeli Embassy stated that Ambassador Michael Oren would not attend J Street's first national conference because J Street supports positions that may "impair" Israel's interest. In April 2010, Oren had a meeting with J Street Executive Director Jeremy Ben-Ami to discuss the issues. After leaving his role as Israeli ambassador to the U.S. and campaigning for an MK position in the Knesset, Oren described his view as follows: "We have to show greater flexibility on the peace issue. Israel is willing to go a serious distance on peace."

In February 2010 the Israeli Foreign Ministry refused to meet with visiting U.S. congressmembers with their J Street escorts. In Haaretz, columnist Bradley Burston wrote that the Foreign Ministry's refusal to meet with the U.S. congressmembers was "a gratuitous move breathtaking in its haughtiness, its ignorance of and disrespect for the United States and the American Jewish community". He said that the Foreign Ministry considered J Street "guilty of the crime of explicitly calling itself pro-Israel, while not agreeing wholeheartedly with everything the government of Israel says and does".

During a panel organized by the Knesset Immigration, Absorption and Public Diplomacy Committee, MK Danny Danon (Likud) and MK Otniel Schneller (Kadima) argued that J Street was not a pro-Israel organization, and proposed a statement to that effect which did not pass. Jeffrey Goldberg at The Atlantic described Israeli prime minister Benjamin Netanyahu's repeated refusal to meet with representatives of J Street as a "farce".

In May 2013, Yedioth Ahronoth reported that the Israeli government appears to be building closer ties to J Street, with a group of J Street representatives scheduled to meet President Shimon Peres.

On March 17, 2015, Netanyahu won a resounding victory in Israeli elections. His denial of a two state solution happening on his watch and comments he made that are considered by some to be "racist" motivated J Street at its convention to make clear its opposition to the occupation, opposition to BDS, opposition to American Jewish support of Jewish settlements in the West Bank and to efforts by organizations like Hillel to limit the discussion on Israel and the peace process. Liberal Knesset Member Stav Shaffir encouraged J Street to hone the message of the pro-peace camp in Israel as well as the U.S.

In February 2017, The New York Times reported that David Friedman, U.S. president Donald Trump's pick to be Ambassador to Israel, would formally apologize for previously labeling supporters of J Street as "worse than kapos" during his conformation hearing. J Street urged those who oppose Friedman's appointment to write to their senators and reject his nomination, collecting more than 600 signatures from American rabbis and cantors.

== Reception ==
=== Liberal Zionist perspectives ===
When J Street was initially founded in 2008, Israeli-American writer and analyst Gershom Gorenberg wrote in the American Prospect that J Street "might change not only the political map in Washington but the actual map in the Middle East".

In 2008, Ken Wald, a political scientist at the University of Florida, predicted the group would be attacked by the "Jewish right". According to BBC News, Wald warned that J Street would "get hammered and accused of being anti-Israel. A lot will have to do with the way they actually frame their arguments."

In April 2009, The Washington Post called J Street "Washington's leading pro-Israel PAC", citing the group's impressive fund raising efforts in its first year and its record of electoral success, including 33 victories by J Street-supported candidates for Congress.

In 2014, The Economist wrote that many liberal Jews in America are opposed to the occupation and distressed by Israel's increasing religious nationalism; those who oppose the policies of Israeli governments but support the State of Israel gravitate to organizations like J Street, whose dovish members include former officials of President Clinton's and President Obama's administrations.

In March 2015 The Forward said of J Street: "Since its inception ... the organization has disrupted the debate about what it means to be pro-Israel." NPR's Mara Liasson described J Street's role in American Jewish dialogue on Israel: "J Street is the pro-two-state group and anti-Netanyahu, pro-nuclear-deal and generally much more supportive of Obama than AIPAC is."

Rabbi Eric Yoffie, president of the Union for Reform Judaism, called J Street's reaction to the 2008-2009 Israeli invasion of Gaza "morally deficient, profoundly out of touch with Jewish sentiment and also appallingly naïve". J Street responded stating, "It is hard for us to understand how the leading reform rabbi in North America could call our effort to articulate a nuanced view on these difficult issues 'morally deficient'. If our views are 'naive' and 'morally deficient', then so are the views of scores of Israeli journalists, security analysts, distinguished authors, and retired IDF officers who have posed the same questions about the Gaza attack as we have." Despite this rebuttal, J Street subsequently invited Yoffie to its 2009 convention, and he praised the organization's stance on the 2014 Israel–Gaza conflict, which was closer to that of other American Jewish organizations.

Chuck Freilich, former deputy national security adviser in Israel, writing in The Jerusalem Post in February 2013, said, "J Street leads only to a dead end" since "only Israelis bear the responsibility for determining their future."

=== Anti- and non-Zionist perspectives ===
At J Street's inception in 2008, Noah Pollak at Commentary predicted that its efforts would fall flat and show there are no "great battalions of American Jewish doves languishing in voicelessness".

In 2011, progressives and anti-Zionists criticized J Street's opposition to Palestinian statehood and recognition of Palestine in the United Nations. Civil rights activist and influential New Left figure Tom Hayden wrote in The Nation that "J Street's decision means there is virtually no dissent in the mainstream American Jewish community from the intransigent positions of AIPAC and the right-wing Netanyahu government." Maen Rashid Areikat, head of the PLO General Mission to the US, expressed disappointment with J Street's position, stating "[W]e thought J Street was going to be a different Jewish organization and play a different role...."

In an April 2012 interview, Norman Finkelstein described J Street as the "hopeless" "loyal opposition" to the Israel lobby and Israeli governing coalition. He reiterated Ben-Ami's claims that the group was politically aligned with the centrist Zionist party Kadima.

In August 2012, The Electronic Intifada critiqued an article published by J Street which referenced a "demographic threat from a stateless Palestinian population," citing it as an example of racism and anti-Palestinian bigotry within J Street.

In December 2013, Jamie Stern-Weiner, a PhD candidate at the University of Oxford, said that "J Street has opposed all efforts to raise the cost of occupation for Israel," including ICC investigations, boycotts and divestments, Israel Apartheid Week protests, and recognition of Palestinian statehood. He additionally criticized J Street Vice President for Policy and Strategy Hadar Susskind having said "J Street unconditionally supports and lobbies for robust U.S. assistance to Israel", indicating that the organization is not designed to challenge Israeli apartheid and militarism, or support Palestinian liberation.

In 2017, from a non-Zionist perspective, Peter Beinart warned that J Street's limited discussion of Israeli offensives and its opposition to BDS puts it at a disadvantage compared to IfNotNow. In particular, he lamented that this weakens J Street's ability to advocate for a two-state solution, compared to IfNotNow's agnosticism between one- and two-state solutions. Since then, Beinart has shifted toward an anti-Zionist position which declares the two-state solution "dead" and calls for an entirely new regime in Palestine which gives Palestinian Arabs and Jews equality under the law.

In 2021, members of the Democratic Socialists of America (DSA) critiqued US Representative Jamaal Bowman's participation in a J Street delegation to Israel to meet with Prime Minister Naftali Bennett, President Isaac Herzog, Foreign Minister Yair Lapid, and the Knesset, noting continued apartheid, occupation, and state violence against Palestinians exacerbated by the current Israeli government. In December 2021, DSA rescinded their national endorsement of Bowman, due to this delegation as well as other concerns, although the New York City chapter continued to back his campaign in the 2024 congressional elections based on a perceived strengthening of Bowman's anti-Zionist positions.

In 2023, M. Muhannad Ayyash wrote in Al-Shabaka, "By calling on Israel to 'give up' territory, J Street implicitly acknowledges ... the foundational logic of liberal Zionism that Israel has a claim to the land from the Jordan River to the Mediterranean Sea."

In October 2023, Sarah Lazare and Adam Johnson of The Nation criticized J Street for attempting to stifle calls for a ceasefire in the Gaza war. The Intercept reported that the lobby group made active efforts to "break down" resistance to US military aid to Israel and reject ceasefire proposals through congressional lobbying.

In February 2024, Mari Cohen of Jewish Currents critiqued J Street's lack of support for a ceasefire during the Gaza war, and unendorsement of pro-Palestine congresspeople. Quoting Stefanie Fox of Jewish Voice for Peace: "In punishing the few Democratic members brave enough to echo the demands of the vast majority of Democratic voters, in a way they are working hand in glove with AIPAC and DMFI to punish support for Palestinian rights." J Street has refused to endorse a variety of politicians for their stances on the Israeli–Palestinian conflict, including Rashida Tlaib, Ilhan Omar, and Jamaal Bowman.

In Esther Kaplan's coverage of Jewish Voice for Peace, she quotes Fox saying that, as US and Israeli governments "were weaponizing Jewish grief and identity to justify [the Gaza genocide ... a] whole new wave of people have seen these liberal Zionist organizations for what they are."

In May 2024, Mondoweiss critiqued J Street for their support for Israeli military aid, Palestinian demilitarization, and rejection of right of return, characterizing its conception of a two-state solution as resembling a reservation system. Additionally, they criticized "its attempt to create a humane lobby group for Israel, without questioning the manifestly unjust ... settlement and expulsion project that created Israel in the first place".

=== Conservative perspectives ===
James Kirchick, writing in The New Republic, called J Street's labeling of AIPAC as "right wing" "ridiculous", further asserting that some of J Street's positions, such as advocating negotiations with Hamas, are not popular with most American Jews. According to a March 2008 Haaretz-Dialog poll, the majority of Israelis do support direct talks with Hamas, although this referred solely to the issue of kidnapped Israeli soldier Gilad Shalit. Kirchick also reacted against J Street's endorsement of the play Seven Jewish Children, which critics accused of being antisemitic.

According to Caroline Glick, deputy managing editor of The Jerusalem Post, J Street is anything but pro-Israel: "Through their actions, J Street and its allies have made clear that their institutional interests are served by weakening Israel. Their mission is to harm Israel's standing in Washington and weaken the influence of the mainstream American Jewish community that supports Israel." Lenny Ben-David, former director of the Israeli branch of AIPAC, said J Street hides "its real anti-Israel face behind a 'pro-Israel' mask". Barry Rubin suggested that J Street is an anti-Israel front for Iranian interests, masquerading as a Zionist organization. Political commentator Alan Dershowitz said, "It is a fraud in advertising to call J Street pro-Israel," and claimed "J Street has done more damage to Israel than any [other] American organization."

In August 2022, the American Israel Public Affairs Committee (AIPAC) tweeted that "George Soros has a long history of backing anti-Israel groups...Now he's giving $1 million to help @jstreetdotorg support anti-Israel candidates and attack pro-Israel Democrats." In response to the tweet, the left-wing Jewish organization IfNotNow denounced AIPAC for antisemitism, tweeting that "AIPAC is the antisemitic far right...They are not a Jewish org, nor claim to be one."

== See also ==
- Conference of Presidents of Major American Jewish Organizations
- Diaspora politics in the United States
- Jewish lobby
- Jewish Agency
- Independent Jewish Voices
- Partners for Progressive Israel
- Israel Policy Forum
- Republican Jewish Coalition
- White House Jewish Liaison
- National Jewish Democratic Council
- Yachad (NGO) - UK-based organisation
