= Hisham Melhem =

Lebanese-American journalist

- Education: Villanova University
- Occupation: journalist
- Years active: mid-1980s to present
- Employer(s): Al Arabiya News Channel, An-Nahar
- Known for: journalism, foreign policy analysis
- Television: Al Arabiya News Channel

Hisham Melhem (Arabic: هشام ملحم Hišām Melḥem) is a Lebanese-American journalist who currently serves as Washington bureau chief of Al Arabiya News Channel and as a correspondent for An-Nahar newspaper.

== Biography ==
=== Background ===
Melhem studied philosophy at Villanova University, and after graduating in 1976 with his B.A., spent three years working on a doctorate in philosophy at Georgetown University.

=== Career ===
Melhem has reported for Radio Monte Carlo and Al-Qabas and An-Nahar newspapers and has served as Washington bureau chief for As-Safir newspaper.

He has also been the Washington bureau chief for Al Arabiya, and hosted their U.S.-Arab relations program, Across the Ocean, for four years.

He writes for others publications, appears on news programs, and speaks publicly. He is an expert for the Woodrow Wilson International Center for Scholars He has appeared as a news commentator about Middle Eastern and other foreign policy areas on PBS NewsHour for nearly two decades.

=== Interviews ===
On 26 January 2009, Al Arabiya News Network was given the first official interview with the newly inaugurated President Barack Obama: Melhem conducted the interview.

Major interviews to date include:

- President George W. Bush
- Secretary of State Colin Powell
- Deputy Secretary of State Richard Armitage
- Secretary of State Condoleezza Rice
- Secretary of Defense Robert Gates
- Chairman of the Joint Chiefs of Staff Admiral Mike Mullen
- President Barack Obama
- Secretary of State Hillary Clinton

== Writings ==
- Dual Containment: The Demise of a Fallacy (1997)
