= Union of Progressive Zionists =

Former North American network of Jewish student activists

The Union of Progressive Zionists (UPZ) was a North American network of Jewish student activists who organized around principles of social justice and peace in Israel and Palestine. The UPZ provided guidance, education, and resources to students who sought to contribute a progressive voice in the campus debate concerning Israel and Palestine.

As of January 2007, the Union of Progressive Zionists had chapters at 60 colleges and universities.

In May 2009, the Union of Progressive Zionists affiliated itself with J Street and became J Street U.

== History ==
The Union of Progressive Zionists was created in the early 2000s by college-age members of Habonim Dror and Hashomer Hatzair, with the support of what was then known as Labor Zionist Alliance (and now Ameinu) and what was then known as Meretz USA (now Partners for Progressive Israel), two US Progressive Zionist organizations. UPZ's first national conference, held in October 2004, drew more than 100 students from 40 schools.

From its founding, the stated intention of the group was to create a network of student activists who supported Israel and opposed the Israeli occupation of the Palestinian territories but felt alienated by both pro-Israel and pro-Palestinian extremists.

== Controversy within the Israel On Campus Coalition ==
In late 2006 and early 2007, the campus activities of the Union of Progressive Zionists created a stir within the Israel On Campus Coalition, an organization that seeks to promote a "pro-active pro-Israel agenda on campus," of which the UPZ was a member. [J Street U, the successor to UPZ, still works with the IOCC.] Some of the coalition's more conservative members, such as the mainstream American Jewish Congress (AJCongress) and the small right-wing group Zionist Organization of America (ZOA), criticized the UPZ for sponsoring speeches by members of an Israeli organization, Breaking the Silence, former soldiers who speak out against human rights abuses they have witnessed in the Israeli-occupied West Bank and Gaza Strip.

In December 2006, the ZOA called for the Israel On Campus Coalition to expel the Union of Progressive Zionists. Although the coalition's steering committee voted 9–0 against expulsion in January 2007, the issue resulted in a debate among major Zionist organizations. The Jewish National Fund joined the ZOA in demanding that the UPZ to end its relationship with Breaking the Silence (but not in calling for the group's exclusion from the coalition), and the World Zionist Organization supported the UPZ, as did a group of 100 academics from Israel. The AJCongress threatened to quit the coalition out of dissatisfaction with the decision to allow the UPZ to remain.

== See also ==
- Habonim Dror
- Hashomer Hatzair
- Labour Zionism
- Zionist youth movement
- Ameinu
- Meretz-Yachad
- Partners for Progressive Israel
