= US–Saudi Arabia AWACS Sale =

1986–87 military aircraft arms sale

The sale of AWACS (Airborne Warning and Control System) surveillance planes to Saudi Arabia by the United States administration of President Ronald Reagan was a controversial part of what was then the largest foreign arms sale in US history. The sale saw objections from a majority of Americans, prominent US Senators, the State of Israel and the Israel lobby.

The sale included five E-3 Sentry AWACS aircraft and eight KE-3 refueling aircraft, with spare parts and support, delivered between June 1986 and September 1987.

== AWACS ==
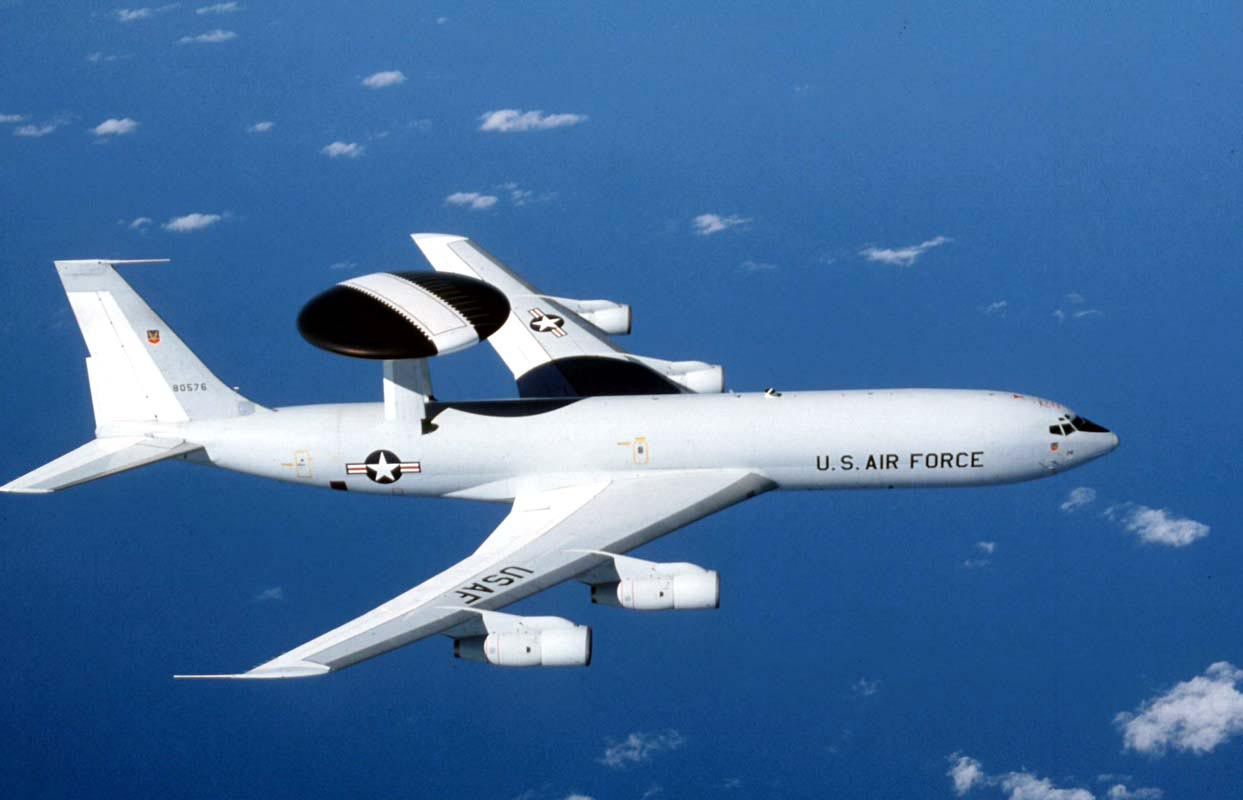
USAF E-3 Sentry in flight

The United States Air Force began using the E-3 Airborne Warning and Control System aircraft in 1977 following ten years of prototype design, development, and testing. The U.S. currently has a fleet of 32 E-3s, the largest in the world. NATO possesses 14, the United Kingdom has seven, Saudi Arabia has five, and France has four.

The E-3 is a modified Boeing 707 commercial jetliner characterized by the strikingly large thirty-foot rotating antenna mounted on its roof. This antenna can detect and track other aircraft within an area of 175,000 square miles (450,000 km^{2}), flying at any altitude or over any terrain, allowing the AWACS to detect aircraft that remain hidden from ground radar. The planes' mobility is a crucial feature, providing for the use of this sophisticated detection equipment whenever and wherever needed; AWACS can be deployed quickly into military conflict "regardless of intensity" according to Boeing, who claims AWACS are the "world’s standard for airborne early warning systems."

The Saudi AWACS bear Arabic writing on their exterior with a translation below, "Royal Saudi Air Force". The roof-mounted antenna is an AWACS plane's dominant feature; it is a smooth black disk with a white stripe down the center, and it rotates constantly. The antenna is about a fifth of the length of the plane and it sits higher above the roof than the plane's roof sits above the ground. Another noticeable difference from a commercial 707 is the lack of passenger windows. Colonel Walt Kowalik said about the lack of windows, "We don't want 'em ... we don't want our people looking out of windows. We want them concentrating on what's in front of them." An Associated Press writer described blue carpet and "subdued" lighting, "as in a movie theatre."

== Reaction in the United States ==
Only months old, the Reagan Administration announced its plans to sell five of the U.S.-made AWACS to Saudi Arabia. The proposal, part of the largest foreign arms sale ever, was not received warmly on Capitol Hill where Congressional consent was required. The AWACS proposal was also harshly rejected by Israel and disapproved of by a majority of Americans. Upon formal introduction of the AWACS proposal to Congress in the fall of 1981, many Senators reacted coldly. "This is one of the worst and most dangerous arms sales ever," proclaimed Massachusetts Senator Edward Kennedy. Senator Donald Riegle said, "We are being asked to submit to a kind of blackmail; the price gouging of oil." These Senators feared that the AWACS sale was not designed to promote stability, as would be claimed by the Administration, but to secure U.S. oil resources. Such a deal would mean technology for oil access, and as Kennedy said, a potentially dangerous deal at that. Senator Bob Packwood, who as a Republican was a member of Reagan's party, was also a leader of opposition to the AWACS deal in the Senate. Packwood spelled out the danger he saw in arming Saudi Arabia: "They have displayed a hostility that must be interpreted as their deliberate intentions to promote continued instability in the Middle East." Packwood questioned the choice of Saudi Arabia as an arbiter of peace saying, "Let’s think about which nations have been seriously committed to negotiating peace in the Middle East and which have not shared that commitment." With the recently ended American hostage crisis in Iran fresh in mind, Americans were reluctant to sell military equipment to anyone. In fact, a May 1981 poll showed that 52% of those surveyed opposed arms sales to any country, and only 19% wanted the U.S. to sell AWACS to Saudi Arabia.

== Considering Israel ==
Israel, feeling its security directly threatened, was the most strongly opposed to the AWACS deal of anyone involved. Israeli Prime Minister Menachem Begin expressed "profound regret and unreserved opposition" to the Saudi AWACS proposal. Experts on Israeli defense said that AWACS could track every move of the Israel's air force, denying it the chance to launch a "surprise first strike, the basis of Israeli defense doctrine." While Israel's "unreserved opposition" was based on the real security threat it faced, its "profound regret" could have been rooted in perceived betrayal by the United States. A protector of Israel since the Six-Day War, the U.S. was planning to sell military surveillance planes to Saudi Arabia, a country hostile towards Israel. A Boston Globe editorial from May 4, 1981, recognized this contradiction as well as other threats posed by the AWACS sale, noting, "the intention to sell AWACS planes to Saudi Arabia constitutes not only a manifest contradiction of Reagan's campaign promise to enhance Israel's security, but also serves to further destabilize the Mideast, a region whose stability was supposed to be a strategic priority of the Reagan foreign policy." The sensitivity of Congress to the threats against peace and stability, was matched by its sensitivity to Israel's concerns.

The Reagan Administration actively sought to diminish Israel's voice and influence over the deal. In public speeches, Administration officials admonished Israel for getting involved in a U.S. foreign policy matter. Secretary of State Alexander Haig said the President must be "free of the restraints of overriding external vetoes," and went on to say that were the AWACS deal blocked by Israeli influence, there would be "serious implications on all American policies in the Middle East. ... I'll just leave it there." Reagan himself declared, "It is not the business of other nations to make American foreign policy."

== Winning support ==
In order to gain support for the AWACS deal in Congress and in the country, the Administration lobbied strongly on behalf of it. Though it continually stated the AWACS deal would benefit US "interests" in the Middle East, the Administration also gave promises of the AWACS planes' importance in securing peace. In a speech to Congress, Alexander Haig said that if the AWACS sale was blocked, "our security, the security of Israel and peace itself (might) be endangered," Reagan himself promoted the AWACS sale saying, "By contributing to the stability of the area, it improves Israeli security." The Administration even commissioned former government officials to speak about AWACS as part of the peace cause. Richard Nixon's Secretary of State Henry Kissinger said "it is essential for the peace process in the Middle East."

Congress approved the AWACS sale, and as part of the then-largest arms export ever, the planes were a symbolic commitment to the US/Saudi relationship.

== US arms sale to Saudi Arabia, 2010 ==
On October 20, 2010, the US State Department notified Congress of its intention to make the biggest arms sale in American history—an estimated $60.5 billion purchase by Saudi Arabia, trumping the former US-Saudi AWACS sale. The package represents a considerable improvement in the offensive capability of the Saudi armed forces. Israel did not raise objections to the sale, except to say that it was "not thrilled about it." At the time, a senior administration official stressed: "This is a big development, because it's part of a larger regional strategy and the maintenance of a strong US presence in the region. We're paying attention to the needs of our allies and what everyone in the region believes is a flexing of muscles by a more aggressive Iran. One way to deal with that is to make our allies and friends strong."

== See also ==
- Al-Yamamah arms deal (British arms sales to Saudi Arabia since 1984)
- Arab lobby in the United States
- Saudi Arabia lobby in the United States
- Israel lobby in the United States
