= Congregation B'nai Shalom (Easton, Pennsylvania) =

Reform synagogue in Easton, Pennsylvania, United States

- Location in Pennsylvania

Religion
- Affiliation: Reform Judaism
- Ecclesiastical or organizational status: Synagogue
- Status: Active

Location
- Location: 1545 Bushkill Street, Easton, Pennsylvania 18042
- Country: United States
- Interactive map of Congregation B'nai Shalom
- Coordinates: 40°41′36″N 75°14′02″W

Architecture
- Style: Synagogue
- Established: 2020 (merged congregation): 1839 (Brit Shalom); 1889 (Bnai Abraham)
- Completed: 1842 (BS: S. Sixth St.); 1907 (BAS: Bushkill St.); 1959 (BS: ??)

Website
- bnaishalomeaston.org

Congregation B'nai Shalom is a Reform Jewish synagogue located at 1545 Bushkill Street, in Easton, Pennsylvania, in the United States. The congregation was formed on August 1, 2020, following the merger of two former congregations.

Founded in 1839 as Brit Shalom, later known as the Temple Covenant of Peace, it is one of the oldest Jewish congregations in the United States. In 2018 the congregation began discussions to merge with the B'nai Abraham Synagogue, founded in 1889.

== History ==
Congregation Brit Shalom was founded on August 26, 1839. In 1842, the congregation built a synagogue building at 38 South Sixth Street. In 1959, the congregation, renamed as Temple Covenant of Peace, moved to a new building. By the late twentieth century, the former S. Sixth St building was used as the Second Baptist Church of Easton. In 1996, Mark W. Gordon identified this building as the third oldest synagogue building in the country. However, the old synagogue, subsequent church, was destroyed by arson on June 21, 2003.

Congregation B'nai Abraham, also B'nai Abraham Synagogue (transliterated from Hebrew as "Children of Abraham"), was founded in 1889 by immigrant Jews were from eastern and central Europe, Russia, and the Baltic countries, who practiced in the Orthodox Ashkenazi rite.

After several years of discussions, in August 2020 the two congregations merged as Congregation B'nai Shalom. At the time of the merger, B'nai Abraham was aligned with the Conservative movement; however, the new merged congregation embraced the Reform movement. The congregation adopted the former B'nai Abraham Synagogue Bushkill Street building as their new place of worship. The former Temple Covenant of Peace synagogue building was sold.
