= Jeffrey Goldberg =

American journalist (born 1965)

- Goldberg in 2026
- Born: Jeffrey Mark Goldberg; 1965 (age 60–61); Brooklyn, New York, U.S.
- Citizenship: United States; Israel (until 2013)
- Education: University of Pennsylvania
- Occupations: Journalist; writer
- Title: Editor-in-chief of The Atlantic
- Spouse: Pamela Ress Reeves (m. 1993)
- Children: 3
- Awards: National Magazine Award, Overseas Press Club's Joe & Laurie Dine Award
- Military career
- Allegiance: Israel
- Branch: Prisons
- Unit: Ktzi'ot Prison
- Conflicts: First Intifada

Jeffrey Mark Goldberg (born 1965) is an American journalist who is the editor-in-chief of The Atlantic. During his nine years at The Atlantic before becoming editor, Goldberg became known for his coverage of foreign affairs. He moderated the PBS program Washington Week (rebranded as Washington Week with The Atlantic) beginning in August 2023, while continuing as The Atlantic's editor.

== Early life ==
Jeffrey Mark Goldberg was born in Brooklyn, New York, to Ellen and Daniel Goldberg. His grandfather was from the shtetl (town) of Leova, Moldova. He grew up in suburban Malverne on Long Island, a predominately Catholic neighborhood he once called "a wasteland of Irish pogromists." Goldberg attended the University of Pennsylvania, where he was the executive editor of The Daily Pennsylvanian.

Goldberg, who is Jewish, dropped out of college and worked for a time at The Washington Post. He then moved to Israel and served in the Israel Defense Forces during the First Intifada as a prison guard at Ktzi'ot Prison, where Palestinian participants arrested in the uprising were held. There he met Rafiq Hijazi, a Palestine Liberation Organization leader, college math teacher, and devout Muslim from a refugee camp in the Gaza Strip, whom Goldberg called "the only Palestinian I could find in Ketziot who understood the moral justification for Zionism".

Many years after his first trip to Israel as a 13-year-old, he became a dual Israeli citizen. Goldberg recalled the sense of empowerment he felt Israel embodied. In a 2013 interview with the Washingtonian, he said he had decided to give up his Israeli citizenship, saying that "If Israel goes much further down the road I think it’s on and becomes more of a theocratic, totalitarian-style state [...] how could the liberal-minded American Jew support that?"

== Career ==
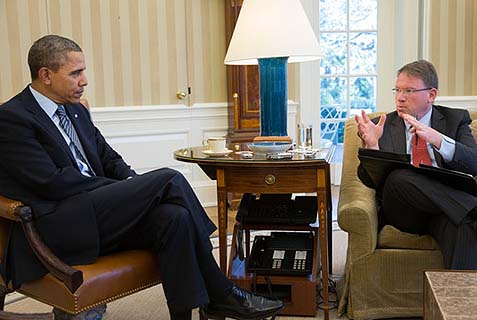
Goldberg interviewing President Barack Obama in the Oval Office, 2014

Goldberg returned to the United States and began his career as a reporter at The Washington Post, where he worked the police beat. While in Israel, he worked as a columnist for The Jerusalem Post. Upon his return to the U.S., he was the New York bureau chief of The Forward, a contributing editor at New York magazine, and a contributing writer at The New York Times Magazine. In 2000, Goldberg joined The New Yorker.

In 2003, "In the Party of God" won the National Magazine Award for reporting.

In 2007, David G. Bradley hired Goldberg to write for The Atlantic. Bradley had tried for nearly two years to convince him to work for The Atlantic, and was finally successful after renting ponies for Goldberg's children.

During his time at The Atlantic, Goldberg has conducted interviews with Barack Obama (five times), Fidel Castro, Hillary Clinton, David Cameron, John Kerry, Benjamin Netanyahu, Isaac Herzog, Marco Rubio, Chris Christie, Ashton Carter, Ben Rhodes, Yair Lapid, Michael Oren, King Abdullah of Jordan, Ta-Nehisi Coates, David Gregory, and Tom Cotton.

In 2011, Goldberg joined Bloomberg View as a columnist. He left Bloomberg in 2014.

Goldberg joined The Atlantic and became editor-in-chief in 2016. He mainly wrote on foreign affairs, with a focus on the Middle East and Africa.

In September 2020, Goldberg published "Trump: Americans Who Died in War Are 'Losers' and 'Suckers'" in The Atlantic. According to Goldberg's article, in cancelling a 2018 visit to the Aisne-Marne American Cemetery and Memorial in France, which contains the remains of 2,289 U.S. service members killed in combat in World War I, President Donald Trump is alleged to have privately said, "Why should I go to that cemetery? It's filled with losers." He also reputedly referred to the more than 1,800 U.S. Marines who lost their lives at the Battle of Belleau Wood as "suckers" for getting killed.

CNN reported that Goldberg's article "immediately became a massive story, with Democrats—including Democratic presidential nominee Joe Biden—rushing to condemn Trump for his alleged behavior and the White House rallying an aggressive pushback against the article, including the President himself." Trump tweeted, "The Atlantic ... is dying, like most magazines, so they make up a fake story in order to gain some relevance. Story already refuted ..."

Referring to Goldberg's "blockbuster revelation," the Intelligencer said "The scope and intensity of the pushback was nuclear." It added, "While it's impossible to directly prove any of these allegations, there is an impressive amount of corroborating evidence. Almost all of it supports Goldberg's reporting," which the Associated Press, The New York Times, Fox News, and The Washington Post "quickly confirmed."

Trump immediately denied making the comments, tweeting, "This is more made up Fake News given by disgusting & jealous failures in a disgraceful attempt to influence the 2020 Election!" Numerous Trump officials present that day pushed back against Goldberg's reporting, including United States ambassador to France Jamie McCourt, stating "In my presence, POTUS has NEVER denigrated any member of the U.S. military or anyone in service to our country. And he certainly did not that day, either." Also denying the report was national security adviser turned Trump-critic John Bolton and deputy chief of staff Zach Fuentes, who was close to former chief of staff John Kelly. Speaking to Breitbart News, Fuentes said, "Honestly, do you think General Kelly would have stood by and let ANYONE call fallen Marines losers?" In October 2023, John Kelly told CNN that Goldberg's reporting was correct.

In August 2023, Goldberg became the moderator of the PBS program Washington Week, which added "with The Atlantic" to its title as an editorial partnership between the program and the magazine was initiated.

=== U.S. government group chat leak ===
In March 2025, Goldberg published an article in The Atlantic stating that members of President Donald Trump's cabinet had inadvertently included him in a Signal group chat that discussed secret military plans for the imminent U.S. attacks on the Houthi in Yemen. National Security Advisor Mike Waltz had mistakenly added Goldberg, who reported that participants in the chat appeared to include Vice President JD Vance, Secretary of State Marco Rubio, Secretary of the Treasury Scott Bessent, Secretary of Defense Pete Hegseth, Director of National Intelligence Tulsi Gabbard, Central Intelligence Agency Director John Ratcliffe, National Counterterrorism Center Director Nominee Joe Kent, White House Chief of Staff Susie Wiles, White House Deputy Chief of Staff for Policy Stephen Miller, and Special Envoy to the Middle East Steve Witkoff. A spokesperson for the National Security Council confirmed Goldberg's report.

== Views ==
In his 2008 article in Slate titled "How Did I Get Iraq Wrong?", Goldberg explained why he initially supported the Iraq War and wrote that he "didn't realize how incompetent the Bush administration could be." Glenn Greenwald called Goldberg "one of the leading media cheerleaders for the attack on Iraq", saying Goldberg had "compiled a record of humiliating falsehood-dissemination in the run-up to the war that rivaled Judy Miller's both in terms of recklessness and destructive impact".

Michael Massing, an editor of the Columbia Journalism Review, called Goldberg "the most influential journalist/blogger on matters related to Israel", and David Rothkopf, former editor and CEO of the FP Group, called him "one of the most incisive, respected foreign policy journalists around." He has been described by critics as a liberal and a Zionist. The New York Times reported that he "shaped" The Atlantic's endorsement of Hillary Clinton in the 2016 United States presidential election, only the third endorsement in the magazine's 160-year history.

== Prisoners: A Muslim and a Jew Across the Middle East Divide ==
Prisoners: A Muslim and a Jew Across the Middle East Divide (New York: Knopf, 2006), describes Goldberg's experiences in Israel working at the Ketziot military prison camp as well as his dialogue with Rafiq, a prisoner whom Goldberg would later befriend in Washington, DC.

The New York Times, The Washington Post, and the Los Angeles Times named it one of the best books of 2006.

The Los Angeles Times critic wrote, "Realization of the humanity of the 'other' is at the heart of New Yorker magazine correspondent Jeffrey Goldberg's sharply observed and beautifully written memoir." The New York Times critic wrote,

Mr. Goldberg, a talented and ambitious writer for the New Yorker ... takes an engagingly personal approach to the issue in his story of a quest for mutual understanding with a Palestinian activist who had been his prisoner... For the bittersweet complexity of that moment, offered in the context of all that has preceded it, this is a genuinely admirable book.

The Washington Post review of the book noted, "Prisoners is Jeffrey Goldberg's sensitive, forthright and perceptive account of his years as a soldier and journalist in Israel—and of his long-running conversation with a Palestinian whom he once kept under lock and key. It is a forceful reminder of how rewarding, and how difficult, discourse between Israelis and Palestinians can be." CBS News critic wrote,

There is no shortage of histories, polemics and policy manuals about the Middle East. An honest but complex story, from what happens to be a personal perspective that many Americans can at least conjure, is a rarer opportunity for insight. And that is what Jeffrey Goldberg, a reporter for The New Yorker, delivers in Prisoners. To those of us who have followed Jeffrey Goldberg's reporting on the Muslim world, the publication of his first book is cause for real pleasure... because his writing on the subject has always been exceptional: wise, unpretentious, and at times, unexpectedly funny.

Boris Kachka, a contributing editor for New York magazine, interviewed Goldberg in October 2006 about Prisoners in addition to other issues pertaining to journalism and the Middle East.

== Personal life ==
Goldberg lives in Washington, D.C., with his wife, Pamela Ress Reeves. They have three children.

== Bibliography ==
=== Books ===
- Prisoners : a Muslim and a Jew across the Middle East divide. Knopf. 2006.
- On Heroism: McCain, Milley, Mattis, and the Cowardice of Donald Trump. Zando. 2024. ISBN 9781638932048.

=== Essays and reporting ===
- "The Great Terror". The New Yorker. March 17, 2002. (About the Halabja massacre in Iraq and Saddam Hussein and al-Qaeda link allegations.)
- "In the Party of God". The New Yorker. October 2002. (About Hezbollah; won the 2003 National Magazine Award for reporting.)
- "Israel's Fears, Amalek's Arsenal". The New York Times. May 16, 2009.
- "The hunted : did American conservationists in Africa go too far?". A Reporter at Large. The New Yorker. 86 (8): 42–63. April 5, 2010. (Note: Delia Owens' anti-poaching efforts in Zambia.)
- "The Point of No Return". The Atlantic. September 2010. (About a possible Israeli attack on Iranian nuclear facilities.)
- "Is It Time for the Jews to Leave Europe?". The Atlantic. April 2015. (About modern antisemitism in Europe.)
- "The Obama Doctrine". The Atlantic. April 2016. (Interview with Barack Obama about his foreign policy Obama Doctrine.)
- "War and consequences". Editor's Note. The Atlantic. 331 (5): 6. June 2023.\
- Applebaum, Anne & Jeffrey Goldberg (June 2023). "The counteroffensive". The Atlantic. 331 (5): 16–31.
- "The Trump Administration Accidentally Texted Me Its War Plans". The Atlantic. March 24, 2025.

=== Critical studies and reviews of Goldberg's work ===
- Lappin, Elena (November 12, 2006). "My Friend, My Enemy". The New York Times Book Review.
- Watzman, Haim. "The Hope: A Middle East Correspondent's Troubled Friendship with the Palestinian He Once Kept Locked Up", The Washington Post, October 29, 2006.
- Jaffee, Robert David. "Tools to Fight Terror: Big Dreams, Good Friends", The Jewish Journal, October 13, 2006.
- Bouldrey, Brian. "An attempt to bridge the divide between 2 men and 2 peoples; Ex-Israeli guard tells of bond with Palestinian", Chicago Tribune, December 31, 2006.
- Kachka, Boris "Brave Heart: Jeffrey Goldberg", New York Magazine, October 16, 2006.

———————

Bibliography notes
