= New Jewish Narrative =

Zionist Jewish organisation in America

The New Jewish Narrative is a progressive Zionist Jewish organization in the United States of America. It was formed in December 2024 as a merger of Americans for Peace Now and Ameinu, the US offshoot of the Israeli Labor Party.

== History ==
=== Americans for Peace Now ===
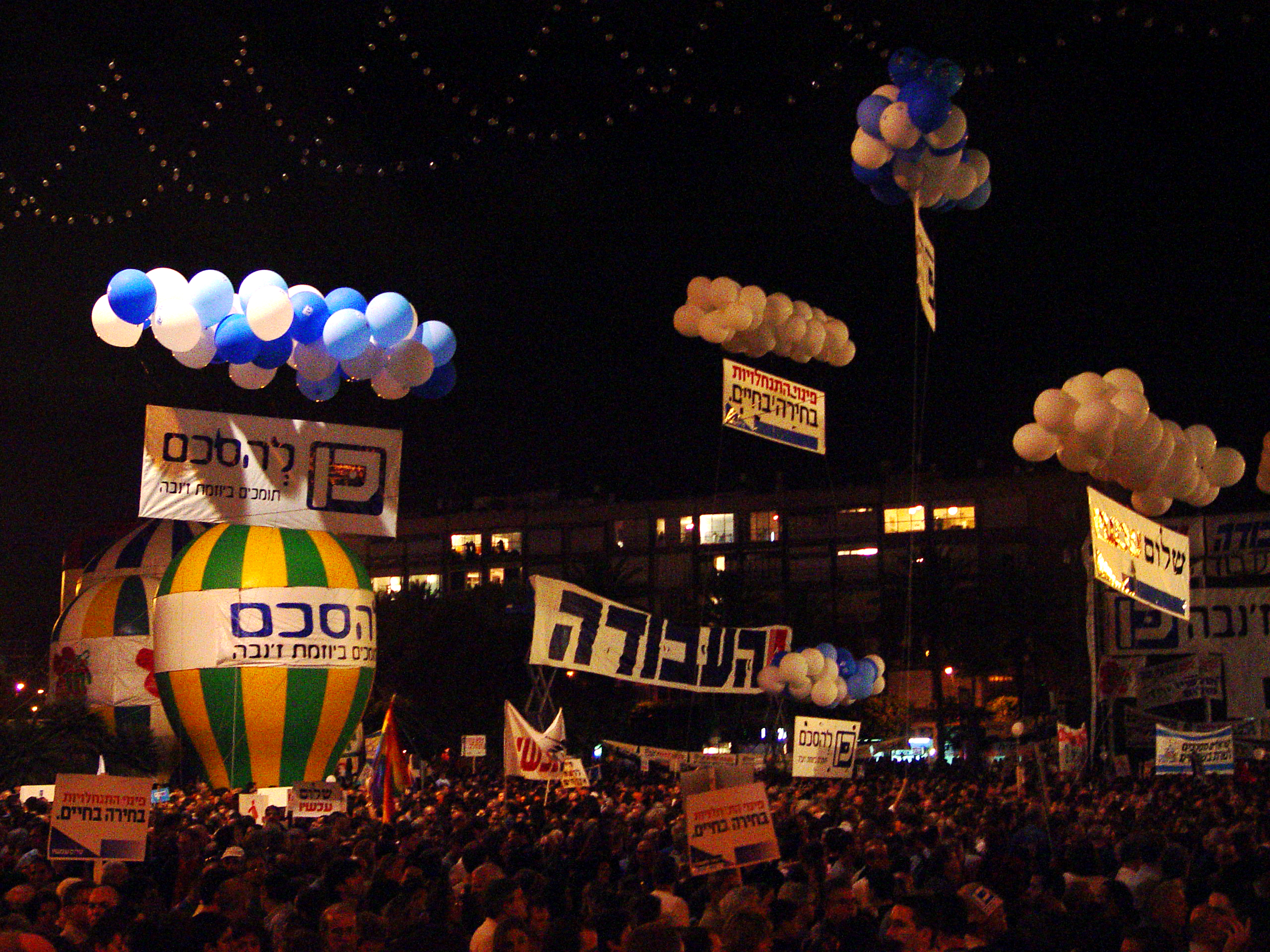
Americans for Peace Now at Tel Aviv Demonstration

In 1978, 348 senior IDF officers wrote a letter to Prime Minister Menachem Begin calling for peace between Israel and Egypt. The letter stated:

The government policy, perpetuating its rule over a million Arabs, could harm the Jewish-democratic character of the state, and makes it difficult for us to identify with the task. Mindful of Israel's security needs and the difficulties on the path to peace, we nevertheless consider that real security can be achieved only when we achieve peace."

This petition led to the creation of the Israeli organization Peace Now (Shalom Achshav).

Americans for Peace Now (APN) was a left-wing nonprofit organization based in the United States founded in 1981 as American Friends of Peace Now. In 1989 it changed its name to Americans for Peace Now. APN described itself as a nonpartisan, nonprofit, pro-Israel, pro-peace, American Jewish organization.

The organization played only a marginal role in American Jewish life in the 1980s, but grew in significance in the 1990s; around 1992 it reported a membership of 10,000 members, in 21 chapters throughout the United States, and was accepted for membership in the Conference of Presidents of Major American Jewish Organizations.

The organization opposed the Boycott, Divestment and Sanctions movement.

=== Ameinu ===
Ameinu (Hebrew: עמנו, "our people") was a left-wing American Jewish Zionist organization, established in 2004 in the tradition of the Labor Zionist Alliance in the United States that had begun with the founding of Poale Zion, which came together in 1906, or as an “offshoot” of the Israeli Labor Party. Ameinu was described as left-wing, liberal, and progressive.

Ameinu was the United States affiliate of the World Labor Zionist Movement and a member of umbrella organizations Progressive Israel Network (along with Americans for Peace Now, Habonim Dror North America, Hashomer Hatzair World Movement, Jewish Labor Committee, J Street, New Israel Fund, Partners for Progressive Israel, Reconstructing Judaism and T’ruah), the Conference of Presidents of Major American Jewish Organizations, and the American Zionist Movement Inter-Agency Task Force on Israeli Arab Issues.

Ameinu established partnerships with Israeli organizations to foster a deeper connection between American Jews and Israel and to financially support the organization's work. NISPED (the Negev Institute for Strategic of Peace Development) addresses economic development and cooperation between Arabs and Jews living inside Israel as well as between Israelis and Palestinians.

Ameinu provided funding for Habonim Dror North America, a Zionist youth movement. Ameinu co-founded the Union of Progressive Zionists student organization and provided funding for its activities.

Ameinu advocated within the American Jewish community around a variety of issues. Ameinu took positions in support of Israeli–Palestinian peace initiatives such as the Geneva Accord and the People's Voice, in support of the Israeli unilateral disengagement from Gaza, opposing divestment from Israel, condemning calls by Iran's president, Mahmoud Ahmadinejad, for the destruction of Israel, in opposition to the destruction of Bedouin villages in Israel, criticising Reverend John Hagee's anti-Catholicism, and on other issues. In 2007 Ameinu took a role in organising a pro-peace rally in Annapolis at the time of the Annapolis Peace Conference convened by President George W. Bush. In 2008, the organization published a booklet entitled "Progressive Zionist Answers to the Anti-Israel Left" for use in communities and on campuses.

By 2022, Ameinu had a staff of one-and-a-half people and an annual income of $357,000.

In 2022, Ameinu signed a statement alongside other liberal Jewish groups Americans for Peace Now, Bend the Arc, Habonim Dror North America, New Israel Fund, T'ruah, and the Religious Action Center condemning a plan by Kevin McCarthy to remove Ilhan Omar from the House Foreign Affairs Committee over her comments appearing to compare the U.S. and Israel to Hamas and the Taliban.

After the 2023 Hamas-led attack on Israel, the group most focused on navigating a left that was increasingly hostile to Israel.

=== Merger ===
In February 2024, Ameinu announced plans to merge with Americans for Peace Now (Ameinu). The two groups' leaders stated the merger would enable the groups to complement each other. APN did advocacy in Washington and maintained ties with the Israeli peace movement, while Ameinu liaised with the Jewish left and engaged more closely with national Jewish groups. For 15 years, both groups had generally been overshadowed by more prominent liberal Israel lobby group J Street. They now act as ideological partners to J Street and similar groups.

In 2024 Americans for Peace Now and Ameinu merged to form the New Jewish Narrative. Nomi Colton-Max and Tom Feldman became the first co-chairs after the merger.

== See also ==
- Projects working for peace among Israelis and Arabs
- Israeli–Palestinian peace process
- Partners for Progressive Israel
- J Street
