= Stephen Zunes =

American international relations scholar

- Born: November 5, 1956 (age 69)
- Spouse: Nanlouise Wolfe

Academic background
- Education: Oberlin College, Temple University, Cornell University

John Stephen Zunes (born November 5, 1956) is an American international relations scholar specializing in Middle Eastern politics, U.S. foreign policy, and strategic nonviolent action. He is known internationally as a leading critic of United States policy in the Middle East, particularly under the George W. Bush administration, and an analyst of nonviolent civil insurrections against autocratic regimes.

== Current position and education ==
Stephen Zunes is a professor of Politics at the University of San Francisco teaching courses on the politics of Middle East and other regions, U.S. foreign policy, nonviolence, conflict resolution, and globalization. He currently chairs USF's Middle Eastern Studies Program. He serves as a senior policy analyst and advisory board member for the Foreign Policy in Focus project of the Institute for Policy Studies, an associate editor of Peace Review, a contributing editor of Tikkun, and a member of the academic advisory council of the International Center on Nonviolent Conflict.

He received his B.A. from Oberlin College in 1979, his M.A. from Temple University in 1983, and his Ph.D. from Cornell University in 1990.

== Previous career ==
A native of North Carolina, Zunes previously served on the faculty of Ithaca College, the University of Puget Sound, and Whitman College. He was a recipient of a National Endowment for the Humanities Fellowship on Middle Eastern and Central Asian Studies at Dartmouth College and a Joseph J. Malone Fellowship in Arab and Islamic Studies. He also served as founding director of the Institute for a New Middle East Policy and as a research fellow at the Institute for Policy Studies, the Institute for Global Security Studies and the United States Institute of Peace.

In 2002, he won recognition from the Peace and Justice Studies Association as Peace Scholar of the Year.

== Doubts over Iraq ==
Zunes publicly doubted prior to the March 2003 invasion that Iraq still had operational weapons of mass destruction and predicted that, "sooner or later, the American public will realize that a U.S. invasion of Iraq has been a disaster" since "such efforts at hegemony inevitably spawn their own resistance". He also predicted that a U.S. invasion and occupation could stir up ethnic and sectarian conflict would make it "difficult to establish a widely accepted and stable regime" and that rather than transform the Middle East to be more stable and democratic, he warned that a U.S. invasion and occupation would increase terrorism and Islamic extremism and that it would "spawn more bitterness, hatred, and violence and will greatly retard economic development, political reform, and reconciliation in the resulting chaos and backlash that will likely follow".

== Views on the Middle East ==
Zunes has also been an outspoken opponent of U.S. backing of some Arab states and of Israel. He has called for an Israeli-Palestinian peace based upon international law which recognizes both Israeli security and Palestinian rights, including a withdrawal of Israeli forces from Palestinian and Syrian territories, an end to terrorism, and security guarantees for Israel and its neighbors.

Zunes has stated that Israel's government "engages in a pattern of gross and systematic human rights violations and blatantly violates a series of UN Security Council resolutions and other international legal principles." Zunes has written that "support for Israel's ongoing occupation and repression is not unlike U.S. support for Indonesia's 24-year occupation of and repression in East Timor or Morocco's ongoing occupation of and repression in Western Sahara." He has also written that "widespread racism toward Arabs and Muslims [is] so prevalent in American society" and that many Americans identify with Zionism because it is "a reflection of our own historic experience as pioneers in North America, building a nation based upon noble, idealistic values while simultaneously suppressing and expelling the indigenous population." Regarding the views of the "far left" on Israel, Zunes has written that many far left organizations have taken "a stridently anti-Israel position that did not just challenge Israeli policies but also questioned Israel's very right to exist" and that this "severely damag[ed] their credibility."

== Publications ==
Zunes is the author of scores of articles for scholarly and general readership on Middle Eastern politics, U.S. foreign policy, international terrorism, nonviolent action, international law, and human rights. More than 450 articles by Zunes are available on his personal website.

Zunes is the author of Tinderbox: U.S. Middle East Policy and the Roots of Terrorism (Common Courage Press, 2003). He is the principal editor of Nonviolent Social Movements (Blackwell Publishers, 1999). With Jacob Mundy, he wrote Western Sahara: War, Nationalism and Conflict Irresolution (Syracuse University Press, 2010).

Zunes is a regular contributor to the Common Dreams, Truthout, and Alternet websites. He has written for The Nation, Tikkun, The Progressive, In These Times, Yes!, and other magazines, and his op-ed columns have appeared in major daily newspapers throughout North America and Europe. He is also a frequent guest on National Public Radio, Pacifica Radio, PBS, BBC, MSNBC and other media outlets for analysis on breaking world events.

== Travels ==
Zunes frequently visits the Middle East and other conflict regions, where he has met with top government officials, academics, journalists and opposition leaders. He has traveled to more than sixty countries and has accepted invitations to speak at venues in more than twenty.

In September 2007, Zunes was among a group of American religious leaders and scholars who met with Iranian president Mahmoud Ahmadinejad. In a subsequent article, Zunes stated that:

[Mahmoud Ahmadinejad] was quite unimpressive. Indeed, with his ramblings and the superficiality of his analysis, he came across as more pathetic than evil... The Iranian president impressed me as someone sincerely devout in his religious faith, yet rather superficial in his understanding and inclined to twist his faith tradition in ways to correspond with his pre-conceived ideological positions.

== Non-violence work ==
A scholar and advocate of nonviolent people power movements, he has also served as a trainer and workshop leader for pro-democracy activists and community organizers in the United States, Latin America, Africa and the Middle East. During his twenties, he worked with Movement for a New Society and other groups advocating nonviolent direct action in opposition to nuclear power, the nuclear arms race, U.S. intervention in Central America, and foreign investment in apartheid South Africa.

== Family life ==
Zunes lives in a cohousing community in Santa Cruz, California with his spouse Nanlouise Wolfe (born 1957), who serves on the staff of the Resource Center for Nonviolence, and their children Shanti (born 1988), Kalila (b. 1990) and Tobin (b. 1993). Zunes is a folk musician and enjoys the outdoors.

Zunes was born in Salisbury, North Carolina, the only child of Helen Karnes Zunes and the Rev. John Zunes, an Episcopal priest. Both parents were active in civil rights, nuclear disarmament, anti-Vietnam War and pro-Palestinian causes. He grew up in the university town of Chapel Hill, attending public and Quaker schools, and spent most summers as well as his early adolescence in the Celo Community in the mountains of western North Carolina. After attending Oberlin College and living in Philadelphia, Washington, and Boston, he married his former college sweetheart in 1987 while in grad school in Ithaca, New York.

== Selected bibliography ==
Books

- Stephen Zunes; Jacob Mundy (2010). Western Sahara: War, Nationalism, and Conflict Irresolution. Syracuse University Press. ISBN 978-0-8156-5258-8.
- Zunes, S. & McNair, R. (eds.) (2008). Consistently Opposing Killing: From Abortion to Assisted Suicide, the Death Penalty, and War. California: Praeger Press. ISBN 0-313-35278-X
- Zunes, S. (2002). Tinderbox: U.S. Foreign Policy and the Roots of Terrorism. Common Courage Press. ISBN 1-56751-226-7 / ISBN 1-84277-259-7
- Zunes, S., Kurtz, L. & Asher, S. (eds.) (1999). Nonviolent Social Movements: A Geographical Perspective. 1999. Blackwell Publishing. ISBN 1-57718-075-5

Articles

- Zunes, Stephen (August 3, 2026). "The Real Story Behind the Human Wave That Entered Ceuta. Did the Israeli and US hostility toward Spain embolden Morocco to think it could get away with creating a border control crisis?". The Nation.
- Zunes, S. (2011). "America Blows it on Bahrain"
- Zunes, S. (2011) "The Gaza War, Congress and International Humanitarian Law"
- Stringfellow, T. (2011) "The Measure of a Movement: Stephen Zunes on Nonviolent Resistance"
- Zunes, S. (2009). "Weapons of Mass Democracy: Nonviolent Resistance Is the Most Powerful Tactic Against Oppressive Regimes"
- Zunes, S. (2009). "The War on Yugoslavia: 10 Years Later"
- Zunes, S. (2008). "The U.S. and Georgia"
- Zunes, S. (2008). "Nonviolent Action and Pro-democracy Struggles". Washington, DC: Foreign Policy In Focus.
- Zunes, S. (2007). "The United States and the Kurds: A Brief History"
- Zunes, S. (2006) "The United States and Lebanon: A Meddlesome History"
- Zunes, S. (2006). "Western Sahara: The Other Occupation"
- Zunes, S. (2006). "U.S. has contributed to Iraq's sectarian strife". National Catholic Reporter.
- Zunes, S. (2006). "U.S. undermines Israeli doves in their quest for peace". National Catholic Reporter.
- Zunes, S. (2005). "How the Hawk Kills the Dove: Western Intervention Keeps Slamming the Door on Peace in Iraq. New Internationalist.
- Zunes, S. (2002). "Nonviolent Resistance in the Islamic world". Nonviolent Activist.
- Zunes, S. (2002). "The Case Against War". The Nation.
- Zunes, S. "The Strategic Functions of U.S. Aid to Israel"
