= Michael Massing =

American writer

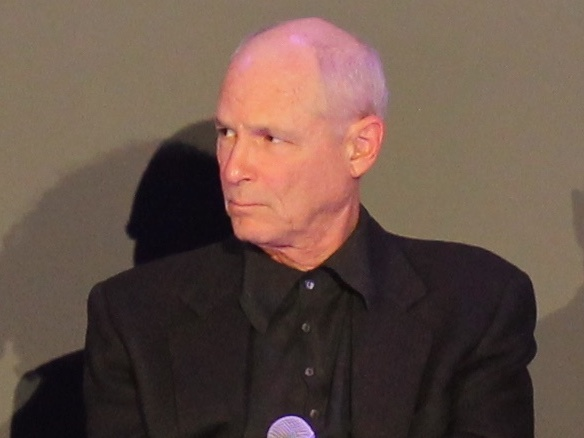
Massing in 2015

Michael Massing is an American writer based in New York City. He is a former executive editor of the Columbia Journalism Review. He received a bachelor's degree from Harvard College and a master's degree from the London School of Economics. He often writes for the New York Review of Books on the media, politics, and foreign affairs. He has also written for The American Prospect, The New York Times, The Nation, The New Yorker, The Guardian, Politico, and The Atlantic. His book The Fix offers a critique of the U.S. war on drugs. Now They Tell Us: The American Press and Iraq is a collection of articles which first appeared in The New York Review of Books and analyzes the press coverage of the Iraq war. A later book, Fatal Discord: Erasmus, Luther, and the Fight for the Western Mind, concerns the rivalry between those two men and the movements they represented—Christian humanism and evangelical Christianity; The New York Times named it a Notable Book of 2018. Massing is co-founder of the Committee to Protect Journalists (CPJ) and currently sits on its board. He is also a board member of the Alicia Patterson Foundation. In 1992, he was named a MacArthur Fellow, and in 2011 he was a fellow at the Leon Levy Biography Center at the City University of New York Graduate Center.

Raised in Baltimore, Massing attended the Baltimore Polytechnic Institute.

== Awards ==
- Alicia Patterson Journalism Fellowship (1989)
- MacArthur Fellow (1992)
- Mongerson Prize for Investigative Reporting (2005)

== Selected articles ==
- "The Storm over the Israel Lobby," New York Review of Books – June 8, 2006
- "Deal Breakers," The American Prospect – Mar. 11, 2002
- "Digital Journalism: How Good Is It?" New York Review of Books, June 4, 2015
- "Digital Journalism: The Next Generation," June 25, 2015
- "Reimagining Journalism; The Story of the One Percent," New York Review of Books, December 17, 2015
- "How to Cover the One Percent," New York Review of Books, January 14, 2016
- "How Martin Luther Paved the Way for Donald Trump," April 19, 2018
- "Journalism in the Age of Trump: What's Missing and What Matters," July 19, 2018
- "Should Democrats pursue progressivism or moderation? That’s a false choice" July 23, 2025

Books

- The Fix. Simon & Schuster, 1998 (paperback: University of California Press, 2000).
- Now They Tell Us: the American Press and Iraq. New York Review Books, 2004 (introduction by Orville Schell).
- Fatal Discord: Erasmus, Luther, and the Fight for the Western Mind. Harper, 2018.
