= Partners for Progressive Israel =

Israel–Palestine-focused American advocacy organization

- Founded: 1992
- Founders: Harold M. Shapiro; Moshe Kagan; Avraham Schenker; Arthur S. Obermayer
- Type: Non-profit; NGO
- Tax ID no.: 13-3607222
- Purpose: Civil Rights in Israel, Human Rights and a negotiated two-state solution to the Israeli–Palestinian conflict
- Location: New York, NY
- Region served: United States, Israel and the Israeli-occupied territories
- Method: "public campaigns, symposia, conferences, lectures, street activities, conference calls, and demonstrations."
- Affiliations: World Union of Meretz
- Website: progressiveisrael.org

Partners for Progressive Israel is an American non-governmental organization and registered 501(c)(3) dedicated to the achievement of a durable, secure, and just peace between Israel and its neighbors, including a two-state solution to the Israeli–Palestinian conflict. Partners for Progressive Israel is devoted to civil rights in Israel and to human rights throughout the area under Israel's control, as well as to social justice, equality, religious freedom, and environmentalism. Partners for Progressive Israel seeks to deepen American Jews' understanding of the complexities of Israeli society in order to enhance their advocacy for a progressive Israel.

In October 2024, Partners for Progressive Israel became the first Zionist group in the United States to call on the United States government to suspend its sale of offensive arms to Israel, calling on the American government to redirect its aid to Israel to peacebuilding efforts.

== Activities ==
Partners for Progressive Israel is the American branch of the World Union of Meretz. The organization's activities in the U.S. include:

- A webinar series, entitled “Conversations with Israel and Palestine”
- Kolot – Voices of Hope: Profiles of progressive civil society work being done by organizations and individuals in Israel
- Israel Horizons – relaunched in 2017 as an online magazine that informs its readers about the activities, ideas, and issues of the Israeli left and its American supporters. (The original Israel Horizons magazine was published by the organization in print from 1952 until 2011. It was founded by journalist Richard Yaffe, Avraham Schenker, Valia Hirsch, Moshe Kagan and Zvi Lurie.
- Public lectures and events
- Theodore Bikel Peace and Justice Internship Program (formerly the “Intern in Israel Initiative”), awarding grants to young activists who volunteer in Israel to advance civil and human rights, social and environmental justice, women’s rights, or LGBTQ rights
- A regularly updated blog
- Participation in the Celebrate Israel Parade as a member of the "progressive cluster" with the New Israel Fund, Ameinu, Americans for Peace Now, B’Tselem USA, and T'ruah (formerly Rabbis for Human Rights-North America).
- Street demonstrations

The organization's activities in Israel include:

- The Israel Symposium, an annual week-long study trip to Israel. Symposium participants meet with Israeli and Palestinian officials, as well as with activists and journalists.
- Participation in the elections to and the meetings of the World Zionist Congress, the governing body of the World Zionist Organization (WZO). In recent years, Partners for Progressive Israel has been a leading organization in the progressive Zionist Hatikvah Slate, which has sent U.S. delegates and alternates to the World Zionist Congress. In 2015, the slate won eight delegates and sixteen alternates, up from five and ten, respectively, the previous election. In February, 2015, Partners for Progressive Israel delegates to the Va’ad Hapoel (General Council) of the WZO, which meets between Congresses, working with colleagues in the U.S. and elsewhere from the World Labour Zionist Movement and Arzenu (representing the Reform Zionist stream), proposed, and ultimately passed, two resolutions as part of a wider campaign to take back control of the budget of the Settlement Division of the WZO from the Israeli government. Both resolutions passed by wide margins.

Partners for Progressive Israel has its national offices in New York City.

=== Progressive Israel Network ===
Partners for Progressive Israel is a founding member of the Progressive Israel Network, created in June 2019. Like the other members of the Progressive Israel Network, Partners for Progressive Israel opposes any boycotts of Israel and specifically opposes the BDS campaign.

== History ==
Partners for Progressive Israel (known originally as Meretz USA, between 1997 and 2011) arose as a merger of several progressive Zionist groups – the Education Fund for Israeli Civil Rights and Peace, which promoted the values of the liberal party, Ratz (the “Movement for Civil Rights and Peace”); Americans for Progressive Israel, which promoted the values of the social-democratic party, Mapam (“United Workers Party”); and the American Friends of Ratz, which had originally been formed to provide financial support for the Ratz party in Israel – until changes in Israeli law limiting parties to contributions from individuals with Israeli citizenship made this no longer possible.

Philosophically, Partners for Progressive Israel represents an integration of two strands of progressive Zionism: Socialist Zionism and Labor Zionism. Socialist Zionism's principles focused on shared society, peace, and social justice.

Following the merger, Meretz USA engaged in advocacy for peaceful negotiations between Israel and the Palestinians and worked to promote an open debate among American Jews about the realization of liberal values in Israel.

The newly merged Meretz USA applied for membership in the Conference of Presidents of Major American Jewish Organizations, but was rejected on repeated occasions. The reasons cited for the rejection included insufficient membership and budget, but some suspected that the rejection was due to the organization's left-leaning orientation.

In 2011, Meretz USA issued a call to buy products made in Israel while refraining from the purchase of products manufactured in Israeli settlements established beyond the Green Line, i.e., the line separating the State of Israel from the territories controlled by Israel beyond the country's internationally recognized boundaries. The campaign was intended to clarify the organization's opposition to an indiscriminate boycott of Israel while reasserting the line between such territories and Israel proper. "Please boycott these brands of food and produce," Partners for Progressive Israel announced on its website in an article entitled "Buy Israeli Produce – Don’t Buy Settlement Produce (They’re not the Same)." Meretz USA President, Dr. Moises Salinas-Fleitman, and Executive Director Ron Skolnik issued the following statement on behalf of the organization calling to refrain from buying Ahava cosmetics, SodaStream carbonated beverage products and Psagot wine and other products.

In mid-2011, Meretz USA changed its name to Partners for Progressive Israel due to confusion caused by its former name and to better reflect the organization's objective of bringing together Israelis and Americans who support a progressive Israel and Zionist movement."

In 2019, Partners for Progressive Israel, together with other organizations in what would become the Progressive Israel Network, signed letters in support of two resolutions approved by the House of Representatives: H. Res. 246, which expressed opposition to the Boycott, Divestment and Sanctions movement and support for a negotiated Israeli-Palestinian two-state solution; and H. Res 326, which expressed support for a two-state solution and opposition to a unilateral annexation of territory by Israel.

=== Earlier History: Education Fund for Israeli Civil Rights and Peace ===
The Education Fund for Israeli Civil Rights and Peace was established in 1991 as a nonprofit organization that would educate Americans on questions of democracy and equal rights in Israel and peace between Israel and the Palestinian people.

Among its original founders were Harold M. Shapiro and Arthur Obermayer. Shapiro was inspired by a visit to Israel in which he met with Meretz party leadership, prompting him to form an organization that would promote that party's values and principles in the United States. Obermayer's involvement followed a trip to Israel and Egypt, from which he returned optimistic about the chances for Israeli-Arab peace.

=== Earlier History: Americans for Progressive Israel ===
Americans for Progressive Israel, one of the organizations that merged into Partners for Progressive Israel, had roots in the Hashomer Hatzair youth movement, which was founded in 1913 in Galicia, Austria-Hungary. In 1946-1947, adult former members of Hashomer Hatzair in the United States, who due to World War II were unable to move to the Yishuv (pre-statehood Israel), came together and created the Progressive Zionist League (PZL).

In the years immediately following Israel's independence, PZL members sought a means for involving people not from the Hashomer Hatzair movement to share in the political activities; in 1950, PZL formed a related group, Americans for Progressive Israel (API). API was active in promoting peaceful relations between Israeli Jews and Palestinian Arabs. In 1952, PZL began publication of a magazine, Israel Horizons. Taken over by API a few years after it was formed, Israel Horizons continued print publication until 2011. When the PZL folded in the 1950s, API assumed the mantle of the adult "arm" of the movement represented by Hashomer Hatzair, as well as PZL's representation in the American Zionist movement and its diverse organizations.

In 1954-55, PZL and PIP merged to form Americans for Progressive Israel–Hashomer Hatzair (API-HH).

Immediately following the Israeli victory in the Six-Day War, API-HH was the first Zionist group in the United States to call for direct negotiations between the government of the State of Israel and the Arab states. Many of API-HH's leaders joined with several other left-Zionists in the U.S. to create a number of peace-seeking American Zionist organizations, including such groups as Breira and Americans for Peace Now.

API-HH also founded a youth organization, Young Americans for Progressive Israel (YAPI).

In 1979, API-HH gave its support to another group of post-college young adults, the “Mordechai Anielewicz Circle of API,” named after the leader of the Warsaw Ghetto Uprising in 1943.

In Israel, many of those adults who had been members of Hashomer Hatzair in the U.S. who had made aliya (moved to Israel) became active in Mapam (the United Workers Party), the political party that was formed to represent the views of the Kibbutz Artzi Federation of Hashomer Hatzair, together with their urban socialists counterparts. In 1992, Mapam, which had been among the first political parties in Israel to discuss openly the need to negotiate with the Palestinians, coalesced with two other parties—Ratz and Shinui—under a single ideological banner of peace - the Meretz party, which would include peace-driven politicians such as Shulamit Aloni, Amnon Rubenstein, and, later, Yossi Beilin. In the mid-1990s, Meretz was Yitzhak Rabin's most supportive coalition partner in the pursuit of a negotiated agreement with the Palestinians.

In the United States in 1997, API merged with two overlapping organizations, American Friends of Ratz — formed to provide financial support for the Ratz party in Israel — and the Education Fund for Israeli Civil Rights and Peace — formed as a non-profit to promote Ratz's values in the United States. The merger of these three groups gave birth to Meretz USA.
