= Council for the National Interest =

American anti-war advocacy group

The Council for the National Interest (CNI) is a 501(c)(4) non-profit, non-partisan anti-war advocacy group focused on transparency about the relationship between Israel and the United States and accountability for the impact their alliance has for other nations and individuals in other countries, especially those in the Middle East. Based in the United States and most active during the 2000s decade, the Council has highlighted Israel's disposition towards its neighbors, Palestinian rights, and other aspects of Middle East life and relations are impacted by the Israel's policies and its financial, trade, and military relationships with the US. They have focused on popular sentiment and perceptions in the US and the between the two countries. They highlight how these policies have impacted the fate of Palestine and, treatment of Muslims within the US since the 1990s.

== Personnel and formation ==
The CNI is aligned with The Council for the National Interest Foundation ("CNIF"), an independent 501(c)(3) nonprofit organization. CNI was founded in 1989 by former Congressmen Paul Findley (R-Ill.) and Pete McCloskey (R-Calif.). Its first executive director was ten-term congressman John B. Anderson (R-Ill.), who ran as an Independent candidate in the 1980 presidential election.

Other officials involved with CNI over the years include long-time president Eugene Bird, a retired career foreign service officer; Edward Peck, former Chief of Mission to Iraq deputy director of the White House Task Force on Terrorism in the Reagan Administration.; former United States Senator James Abourezk; former CNI Vice-chair David Newton, a former United States Ambassador to Iraq and Yemen, and Richard H. Curtiss, former chief inspector of the United States Information Agency.

Ambassador (ret.) Robert V. Keeley is CNI's chair and Alison Weir is the organization's president. Former Central Intelligence Agency officer Philip Giraldi is its executive director. Giraldi has stated that CNI has 12,000 members.

CNI was a member of the US Campaign for Palestinian Rights until 2017, when it was removed for violating the campaign's policy on antisemitism, due to Giraldi's expression of antisemitism in an article for the Unz Review.

== Activities ==
=== Position statements ===
CNI issues position statements, articles and recommendations on Middle East-related issues and is quoted in mainstream and Middle East media.

- In 1988 CNI President Eugene Bird wrote about Israel's ignoring United States State Department complaints about detention and possible torture of U.S. citizens. In early 2002, Eugene Bird criticized then-United States President George W. Bush for supporting Israel's policies in the occupied West Bank.
- In 2003, CNI called for the Senate to reject Daniel Pipes as a trustee of the United States Institute of Peace, charging he had "gone out of his way to say insulting things to Arabs, Palestinians, Muslim Americans, Black Muslims, Muslims and Islam."
- In 2004 it opined on the probable transfer of power from Yasser Arafat to his successor.* "Analysis: Preparing the post-Arafat era" (2004)
- In 2005 a representative criticized a World Bank's proposed plan to give Palestinians money to enhance check points, noting that if those checkpoints were in the occupied territories it was against international law.
- After the U.S. Congress gave Israel a vote of confidence during its 2006 bombing of Lebanon, Eugene Bird said, "This is the usual problem with any resolution that talks about Israel—there are a lot of closet naysayers (in Congress), but they don't want to be a target of the lobby of Israel."
- In October 2006, CNI published a piece on the negative effect of Christian Zionists on U.S. foreign policy, and held a forum on the topic featuring Reverend Bob Edgar of the National Council of Churches.
- In April 2006, after professors John Mearsheimer and Stephen Walt produced their disputed paper entitled "The Israel Lobby and U.S. Foreign Policy", CNI's Paul Findley told National Public Radio he was pleased about the paper and said "I think I can pose as a foremost expert on the lobby for Israel, because I was the target the last three years I was in Congress."
- In the first days of the 2008–2009 Gaza War, CNI issued a statement comparing the attacks to the 1960 Sharpeville massacre where the South African apartheid regime killed 69 protesters, leading eventually to sanctions against the regime. In August 2009, Paul Findley was quoted by The Christian Science Monitor as saying that President Obama's demands Israel stop the settlements had made him a target of the Israel lobby in the United States.

=== Draft legislation ===
In 2004, CNI proposed the "Israel Accountability and Security Act of 2004". It called upon Israel to dismantle all existing settlements outside of the 1967 border, to halt construction of the Israeli West Bank barrier, to end home demolitions in the West Bank and Gaza, and to dismantle its nuclear weapons program and join a Middle East non-proliferation treaty, and to engage in "serious and unconditional" negotiations with the Palestinians, Syria and Lebanon. Noncompliance would result in U.S.-imposed diplomatic, military and economic sanctions. It also commissioned a Zogby poll which found 56 per cent of Americans agreed that Congress should pass such a bill. The bill never became law.

=== Israel lobby in the United States ===
CNI representatives have signed on to joint initiatives, as Eugene Bird did to the 2004 letter by 60 former U.S. diplomats who distributed a letter critical of President George W. Bush's "endorsement of Israeli Prime Minister Ariel Sharon's unilateral plan to reject the rights of three million Palestinians, to deny the right of refugees to return to their homeland, and to retain five large illegal settlement blocs in the occupied West Bank", reversing "long-standing American policy in the Middle East". In February 2005, CNI joined other concerned organizations in a meeting with Department of State officials regarding Israeli mistreatment of Palestinian American prisoners and called for the release of some of the prisoners. In May 2005, CNI joined with more than a dozen groups to protest the annual American Israel Public Affairs Committee (AIPAC) convention. In July 2006, CNI co-sponsored a protest of over 400 people at the Israeli Embassy during the 2006 Lebanon War between Israel and Hezbollah. In 2007 CNI joined 30 other groups calling for the U.S. government to obtain detailed site information on Israel's cluster bomb strikes in Lebanon during its 2006 attacks on that nation. In 2012, the Council's director Alison Weir participated in a panel on AIPAC during the "Occupy AIPAC" conference in Washington, D.C., that was organized by a number of antiwar and pro-Palestinian groups.

=== Polls ===
CNI has commissioned several polls. A 2003 Zogby International poll showed that while 56% of Americans strongly support or somewhat support a Palestinian state, 30% somewhat or strongly oppose a Palestinian state while 14% were not sure. A mid-2004 Zogby poll found that half of all likely American voters agreed that Democratic Party presidential candidate John Kerry "should adopt an entirely new policy, different from the present administration, toward Israel." A 2006 Zogby poll on the Iraq war found that a nearly equal number of likely American voters (40 to 39 percent) agreed or disagreed with the proposition that "the work of the Israel lobby on Congress and the Bush administration has been a key factor for going to war in Iraq and now confronting Iran."

=== Conferences and hearings ===
In April 2002, CNI's Foundation sponsored a four-day conference titled "Rescue U.S. Middle East Policy and Challenge the Lobby" meant to draw attention to what it believed was the George W. Bush administration's lop-sided pro-Israeli policies. Speakers included former members of the United States Congress, representatives of Palestinian and Arab groups who recently had witnessed Israeli demolition of West Bank refugee camps during "Operation Defensive Shield", and members of the media who discussed the media's role in foreign policy. Conference attendees also spent a full day lobbying members of congress.

CNI conducts public hearings on Capitol Hill. Noteworthy events included a June 2004 event CNI co-sponsored with the Council on American-Islamic Relations, a presentation on "The Muslim Vote in 2004" where independent presidential candidate Ralph Nader complained that "Muslim Americans are only the latest religious and ethnic group to feel the brunt of political hysteria and abuse" and commented about Israeli leaders "The days when the chief Israeli puppeteer comes to the United States and meets with the puppet in the White House and then proceeds to Capitol Hill, where he meets with hundreds of other puppets, should be replaced." This led to a heated debate with the Anti-Defamation League. The Council for the National Interest partnered with the International Conference to Review the Global Vision of the Holocaust, a Holocaust denial conference held in Tehran, Iran in 2006.

Other hearings include a 2004 hearing "Voting to Reverse the Neocons", a January 2006 hearing featuring Palestinian envoy Afif Safieh and a mid-2006 hearing on "The Politics of Starvation: The Humanitarian Crisis in Palestine". In 2008 CNI sponsored a hearing on the dangers of United States' uncritical support for Israel which featured professor John Mearsheimer.

=== Advertisements ===
In 2005 and 2010, CNI paid for full-page ads in The New York Times promoting its positions. In 2004 it paid for an ad in The Washington Times that criticized Israel for conducting espionage and covert operations against the United States and for erecting an "apartheid wall" separating Israel and Palestinians and building illegal settlements. AIPAC replied that this was an attempt to convince policymakers that AIPAC "is doing something wrong". In 2013 CNI paid for ten billboard advertisements in Atlanta, Georgia, and six more nationwide protesting United States government's "blank check" funding for Israel.

=== Fact finding tours ===
For a number of years, CNI has been known in the Middle East for organizing regular "political pilgrimages" to promote dialogue among American citizens, including many former officials, and Arab leaders, many of whom are on the United States "political terrorism" list or the unofficial persona non grata list. These have included Hezbollah's Naim Qassim, Nawaf Ammar and Ibrahim Mousawi and Lebanon's Grand Ayatollah Mohammad Hussein Fadlallah, Michel Aoun, Walid Jumblatt and Sheik Abed al Karem Obeid. In Spring 2006, CNI members, including Edward Peck, conducted a fact-finding tour of the Middle East region, meeting with heads of state and acting as international observers in the Palestinian election process. Three were former U.S. diplomats who met in Lebanon with Hassan Nasrallah leader of Hezbollah.

In July 2007 CNI sponsored a meeting in Haret Hreik, Lebanon, between former U.S. Ambassador to Lebanon Robert Dillon and leaders of Hezbollah. In preparation for the November 2007 Annapolis Conference to discuss a two-state solution for the Israeli–Palestinian conflict, CNI funded a 2007 trip by six representatives, including Ambassador Robert V. Keeley and Daniel Lieberman. They met in face-to-face talks with prime ministers, foreign ministers and non-government officials of Israel, the Palestinian Authority, Jordan, Syria and Lebanon.

CNI sponsored a 2008 trip which included both "citizen diplomats" and retired diplomats like Richard Noyes Viets who met with, among others, representatives of Hamas. In 2009 CNI representatives, including former Ambassador to Russia Jack F. Matlock, Jr. met with Hamas leader Khaled Mashal. The tour of Gaza, Israel, the West Bank, Egypt, Jordan and Lebanon was led by Harriet Mayor Fulbright, wife of the late U.S. Senator J. William Fulbright. She later wrote Secretary of State Hillary Clinton asking her to urge Israel to allow freer movement in and out of Gaza and to allow U.S. diplomats to meet with Hamas and Hezbollah officials.

In 2010, a delegation of politicians, academics and members of the Council for the National Interest met with Gaza Strip Prime Minister Ismail Haniyeh. His spokesperson told reporters Haniyya wanted direct relations with the United States and the international community and said that "Hamas is not against the efforts aiming to establish of a Palestinian state on the pre-1967 borderlines with Jerusalem as its capital". Then CNI vice-chair Ambassador David Newton said the group intended to "convey the reality of the humanitarian situation to the US Congress."

== Controversy ==
CNI has been called anti-Israel by author Mitchell Bard and Martin J. Raffel of the Jewish Council for Public Affairs.

Executive director of CNI, Philip Giraldi, is also the author of a regular column at The Unz Review, a far right online publication known to publish advocacy for Holocaust denial and justifications for anti-semitism.

In 2000, Pete McCloskey gave a speech at a conference of the Institute for Historical Review, a publisher of Holocaust denial material. When McCloskey ran in the 2006 Republican Party primary for Congress, which he would lose, there was a public controversy over exactly what he said about the Holocaust at the event.

Abdurahman Alamoudi, a member of the CNI board of directors, stated at a rally on October 28, 2000, against Israel in Lafayette Park, across from the White House: "'Hear that, Bill Clinton! We are all supporters of Hamas. I wish they add that I am also a supporter of Hizballah." Both Hamas and Hizballah are designated as terrorist groups by the United States, Israel, Japan, Canada and others.

In 2004, Alamoudi pleaded guilty to financial and conspiracy charges related to terrorism and was subsequently sentenced to 23 years in prison. Eugene Bird explained that at the time he joined CNI Alamoudi was a highly regarded Muslim spokesperson who worked with the United States Department of State. As soon as Alamoudi was convicted, CNI asked him to leave its board.

On May 4, 2004, Eugene Bird was interviewed by Neil Macdonald on Canadian Broadcasting Corporation's (CBC) National News and commented, "We know that the Israeli intelligence was operating in Baghdad after the war was over. The question should be, were there any foreign interrogators among those that were recommending very, very bad treatment for the prisoners?" Honest Reporting Canada, a pro-Israel NGO objected to Eugene Bird's comments and wrote complaints to the CBC. This resulted in CBC later stating "there was no evidence Israel was involved in the Abu Ghraib affair" and that CBC was negligent in not mentioning Bird's connection to the Council for the National Interest.

The ADL voiced concern about a 2003 article written by board member Paul Findley, in which the ADL said Findley blamed America's relationship with Israel for the September 11 attacks. The ADL quoted Findley as writing "Nine-eleven would not have occurred if the U.S. government had refused to help Israel humiliate and destroy Palestinian society".

In 2006, the Jewish Community Center of Greater Washington cancelled a poetry reading by the Partners for Peace group because it rented office space from CNI. Center representative stated that because of Partners for Peace's "link to an anti-Zionist group, we decided it wasn't in the best interests of the center and the community to co-sponsor the event." Faith United Methodist Church in Rockville sponsored the event instead.

== See also ==
- If Americans Knew
- List of anti-war organizations
