= If Americans Knew =

American nonprofit organization

- Formation: Tax-exempt since April 2004; 22 years ago
- Type: 501(c)(3)
- Tax ID no.: EIN: 260224844
- Headquarters: Menifee, California
- President: Alison Weir
- Revenue: 532,740 USD (2024)
- Expenses: 643,799 USD (2024)
- Website: www.ifamericansknew.org

If Americans Knew (IAK) is a nonprofit organization based in Riverside County in Southern California that focuses on the Israeli–Palestinian conflict and the foreign policy of the United States regarding the Middle East, offering analysis of American media coverage of these issues. The group's website declares its aim is to provide "what every American needs to know about Israel/Palestine." The site is critical of U.S. financial and military support of Israel. It has accused The New York Times and other mainstream news organizations of being biased in favour of Israel.

In addition to its founder, the freelance journalist Alison Weir, board members include Paul Findley, a former United States Representative and author of They Dare to Speak Out: People and Institutions Confront Israel's Lobby, and Andrew Killgore, a former ambassador of the United States to Qatar.

== Background ==
According to the organization's website, founder Alison Weir traveled independently throughout the West Bank and Gaza Strip in 2001, where she found a situation she considered to be different from what was being reported by the American media. She stated that the U.S. press portrayal was significantly at odds with that reported by media throughout the rest of the world, and that American citizens were being misinformed and uninformed on what she considered one of the most significant issues affecting them today. Weir therefore founded an organization that would reflect what she considered to be a more objective viewpoint.

In addition to its information website, If Americans Knew places billboards and advertisements about U.S. financial support for Israel and founder Weir publishes op-eds about the topic in the Orlando Sentinel.

== Positions ==
The organization's stated goal is "to inform and educate the American public on issues of major significance that are unreported, underreported, or misreported in the American media," going on to say: "It is the goal of If Americans Knew to inform the American public accurately about [Israel-Palestine]. Most of all, it is to inform Americans about our enormous, and too often invisible, personal connection to it.".

If Americans Knew holds that United States' support of Israel should be reduced on the grounds that it is not in American interest or aligned with American principles, costs American taxpayers billions, is increasingly imperiling American lives, and prevents peace.

It asserts that U.S. support of Israel has long been driven by lobbying on behalf of a foreign government, often via AIPAC, over the objections of State Department and Pentagon experts, and in recent years by the efforts of a "growing number of individuals with close ties to Israel (known as neoconservatives)" in high-level U.S. Government positions.

It believes that there is a "cover-up of appalling proportions" about Israel/Palestine in the American news media. In 2005, it published a study critical of The New York Times coverage of Israeli and Palestinian deaths, and met with then New York Times Public Editor Daniel Okrent to discuss their study. In subsequent column Okrent mentioned the meeting but dismissed IAK's conclusions.

It has drawn attention to the number of Jewish judges on the US Supreme Court, writing of Barack Obama's appointment of Merrick Garland that it is "questionable for one small group to have enormously disproportionate representation on the highest court of the land".

It falsely claimed the 2020 Beirut explosion was caused by Israel.

Executive Director Alison Weir writes that ending U.S. military aid to Israel would "help bring peace to the Middle East, build a safer world and alleviate massive misery." She has "accused American supporters of Israel of fomenting wars and involving the United States in them, has said that Nazi and Zionist leaders colluded during World War II, and has claimed that Israel harvests Palestinian organs."

== Reception ==
If Americans Knew was accused of antisemitism by Jewish Voice for Peace, U.S. Campaign to End the Occupation and the Anti-Defamation League (ADL). The ADL has called If Americans Knew an "anti-Israel organization" (placing it in its "Top 10" "most influential and active anti-Israel groups" in the US in 2013) and stated that "Weir's criticism of Israel has, at times, crossed the line into anti-Semitism." It cited Weir's use of a quotation by Israel Shahak that characterized beliefs of certain Israelis as "such a ruthless and supremacist faith." Weir stated that she considered this quoted characterization as not pertaining to the mainstream of Judaism, and has demanded that the ADL correct what she termed "defamatory and inaccurate statements."

In 2015, Jewish Voice for Peace criticised IAK for arguing that America is innocent of perpetuating injustice in the Middle East, for IAK's "tail wags the dog" approach to Israel–US relations, and its devaluing of both Jewish and Palestinian perspectives on the conflict: "according to Weir and If Americans Knew, only non-Arab, non-Muslim, non-Palestinian, and non-Jewish voices can be trusted to speak the truth, based solely on their ethnic or religious identity".

In 2016, it was recommended in Salon.com by Stanford University professor David Palumbo-Liu as an alternative source of information on Israel, but he withdrew the recommendation after controversy.

In 2006, If Americans Knew was described as "valuable" by the media monitoring organization Fairness and Accuracy in Reporting (FAIR).

== See also ==
- The Link
- American Palestine Public Affairs Forum
- American Task Force on Palestine
- Palestine Media Watch
- Middle East Media Research Institute
- Washington Report on Middle East Affairs
