= Occupation 101 =

- Directed by: Sufyan Omeish; Abdallah Omeish
- Written by: Sufyan Omeish; Abdallah Omeish
- Produced by: Sufyan Omeish; Abdallah Omeish
- Narrated by: Alison Weir
- Cinematography: Sufyan Omeish; Abdallah Omeish
- Edited by: Sufyan Omeish; Abdallah Omeish
- Music by: Zan Nakari; Eric Olsen
- Release dates: March 25, 2006 (East Lansing Film Festival); May 15, 2007 (United States)
- Running time: 90 minutes
- Country: United States
- Language: English

Occupation 101: Voice of the Silenced Majority is a 2006 documentary film on the Israeli–Palestinian conflict directed by Sufyan Omeish and Abdallah Omeish, and narrated by Alison Weir, founder of If Americans Knew. The film focuses on the effects of the Israeli occupation of the West Bank and Gaza Strip, and discusses events from the rise of Zionism to the Second Intifada and Israel's unilateral disengagement plan, presenting its perspective through dozens of interviews, questioning the nature of Israeli–American relations—in particular, the Israeli military occupation of the West Bank and Gaza, and the ethics of US monetary involvement. Occupation 101 includes interviews with mostly American and Israeli scholars, religious leaders, humanitarian workers, and NGO representatives—more than half of whom are Jewish—who are critical of the injustices and human rights abuses stemming from Israeli policy in the West Bank, East Jerusalem, and Gaza.

== Cast ==
The entire list of featured interviews:

- Dr. Albert Aghazarian, Director of Public Relations at Birzeit University, Palestinian Armenian
- Ambassador James E. Akins, Former U.S. Ambassador to Saudi Arabia
- Rabbi Arik Ascherman, Rabbis for Human Rights (Israeli group)
- Dr. William Baker (theologian), Christians and Muslims for Peace
- Bishop Allen Bartlett Jr., Diocese of Washington
- Phyllis Bennis, Institute for Policy Studies, and co-chair of the U.S. Campaign to End the Israeli Occupation
- Peter Boukaert, Director of Emergencies at Human Rights Watch
- Sharon Burke, Former Advocacy Director of Amnesty International
- Professor Noam Chomsky, linguist, MIT Professor.
- Father Drew Christiansen, United States Catholic Conference
- Cindy and Craig Corrie, parents of the late solidarity activist Rachel Corrie
- Douglas Dicks, Catholic Relief Services in Jerusalem, outreach program director
- Richard Falk, 2001 United Nations Fact-finding Commission in the West Bank and Gaza
- Paul Findley. U.S. Congressman, 1961–1983
- Thomas Getman, World Vision International
- Neta Golan, Israeli co-founder of International Solidarity Movement
- Jeff Halper, Israeli Committee Against House Demolitions
- Amira Hass, Israeli journalist, Haaretz
- Doug Hostetter, Fellowship of Reconciliation
- Kathy Kamphoefner, Christian Peacemaker Team
- Adam Keller, Gush Shalom, Israeli Peace Group
- Hava Keller, Woman's Organization for Political Prisoners (Israeli group)
- Professor Rashid Khalidi, School of International and Public Affairs, Columbia University
- Peretz Kidron, Israeli journalist, Yesh Gvul (Israeli peace group)
- Rabbi Michael Lerner, Founder & editor-in-chief of Tikkun magazine
- Rabbi Rebecca Lillian, Jewish Alliance for Justice and Peace
- Roger Normand, Center for Economic and Social Rights
- Allegra Pacheco, Israeli human rights lawyer
- Professor Ilan Pappe, Israeli historian – University of Haifa (now University of Exeter)
- Dr. Eyad al-Sarraj, prominent Palestinian psychiatrist
- Yael Stein, B'Tselem, Israeli human rights group
- Gila Svirsky, Coalition of Women for Peace, Israeli
- Ambassador Edward Walker, Former U.S. Ambassador to Israel
- Alison Weir, Founder of If Americans Knew

== Awards ==
The film has won several awards from various film festivals.

- Winner of the "Golden Palm" Award (highest honor given by jury) and for "Best Editing" at the 2007 International Beverly Hills Film Festival.
- Winner of the 'Artivist Award' for Best Feature Film under the category of Human Rights at the 2006 Artivist Film Festival & Awards in Hollywood.
- Winner of the Best Documentary Award (Special Recognition) at the 2007 New Orleans International Human Rights Film Festival.
- Winner of the Best Feature Film Award at the 2006 River's Edge Film Festival.
- Winner of the Best Documentary Feature Award at 2006 The Dead Center Film Festival.
- Winner of the Audience Award for Best Documentary at 2006 East Lansing Film Festival.
- Winner of the John Michaels Memorial Award at the 2006 Big Muddy Film Festival.
