= Anti-Israel lobby in the United States =

American organizations that oppose relations between the U.S. and Israel

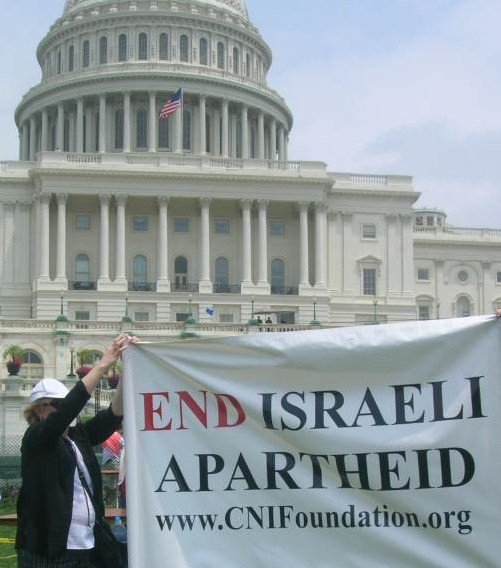
Council for the National Interest at June 2007 rally referencing the Israel and apartheid analogy.

The anti-Israel lobby refers to American organizations created to pressure the public and private sector against ties with the State of Israel.

Caroline Glick, managing editor of The Jerusalem Post, wrote in a 2009 opinion column that recent years have seen "the emergence of a very committed and powerful anti-Israel lobby in Washington." However, critics of Israel's policies often object to the phrase "anti-Israel" being used in regards to such lobbying.

In 2026, The Guardian reported that recent conflicts Israel had been involved in, primarily the Gaza war and the US-Israel war on Iran, had caused a large change in US public opinion on Israel. A Pew Research Center opinion poll in April 2026 showing a record 60% of US adults had an unfavourable view of Israel. This change particularly affected moderate Democrat voters and the voting of Senate Democrats.

== Organizations labeled members of the "anti-Israel lobby" ==
=== American Friends of the Middle East ===
Historian Paul Charles Merkley wrote in his 2001 book, Christian Attitudes Towards the State of Israel, that the American Friends of the Middle East, which was founded in 1951, "remains an active anti-Israeli lobby."

=== American-Arab Anti-Discrimination Committee ===
Martin J. Raffel identified the American-Arab Anti-Discrimination Committee (ADC) as being part of "The Anti-Israel lobby", hostile to the Jewish-American community in the late 1980s. The Jerusalem-based NGO Monitor identified it as "very active" in "anti-Israel political causes."

=== Council for the National Interest ===
Rafael Medoff, founding director of The David S. Wyman Institute for Holocaust Studies, labels the Council for the National Interest (CNI) as an organization that is part of the "anti-Israel lobby." CNI was founded following former Congressman Paul Findley's 1982 defeat by "pro Israel political action committee (PAC) money." CNI's website states its objective as "seeking to encourage and promote a U.S. foreign policy in the Middle East that is consistent with American values, protects our national interests, and contributes to a just solution of the Arab-Israeli conflict. It is CNI’s goal to restore a political environment in America in which voters and their elected officials are free from the undue influence and pressure of foreign countries and their partisans."

=== Other organizations ===
In 2008, The Jerusalem Post wrote that Wikipedia is "Part anarchy, part mob rule" and that "the 'mob' is the vast anti-Israel lobby that haters of our country have managed to pull together." The article focused on the negative reaction to the Committee for Accuracy in Middle East Reporting's Israeli lobby campaign in Wikipedia.

Caroline Glick wrote that the "anti-Israel Jewish lobby J Street," supported by several other Jewish groups, "supports the White House's hostile positions on Israel as ends unto themselves." She also identifies George Soros as the individual who "first raised the prospect of a Jewish anti-Israel lobby in October 2006."

== Individuals labeled members of the "anti-Israel lobby" ==
- Writing in his Foreign Policy blog, David Rothkopf lists former President of the United States Jimmy Carter and his former National Security Advisor Zbigniew Brzezinski as members of the "anti-Israel lobby", as well as "celebrity activists like Richard Gere, and many members of the media."
- Jeff Robbins, in a 2007 The Wall Street Journal opinion piece, titled "Anti-Semitism and the Anti-Israel Lobby," wrote that the billions of petrodollars Arab states spend in the U.S. for defense and business contracts have influenced U.S. politicians. He includes Edward Stettinius Jr., United States Secretary of State between 1944 and 1945, who at the time opposed American support for the creation of a Jewish state in the Middle East, stating, "It would seriously prejudice our ability to afford protection to American interests, economic and commercial . . . throughout the area."
- Medoff labels Pat Buchanan as an active leader of the anti-Israel lobby.

== Criticism of the term ==
Bret Stephens, foreign-affairs columnist of The Wall Street Journal and former editor of The Jerusalem Post, in a 2006 speech to the Chicago Friends of Israel student organization at the University of Chicago, criticized John Mearsheimer and Stephen Walt's The Israel Lobby and U.S. Foreign Policy for lumping together "the hugely disparate elements" of groups that support Israel and suggest they constitute a "lobby." To make his point, he described a hypothetical "anti-Israel lobby" made up of disparate groups, including such political opposites as Pat Buchanan and Noam Chomsky.

In 2008, University of Florida political scientist Ken Wald warned that the left leaning pro-Israel lobby group J Street "will get hammered and accused of being anti-Israel" by "more conservative pro-Israeli factions." The founder of J Street responded to such criticism of being "anti-Israel" saying that "the most pro-Israel thing any American politician or policy maker can do is help to bring about a two-state solution and a comprehensive peace agreement between Israel and her neighbours."

== See also ==
- Anti-Zionism
- Gaza war protest vote movements
- Boycott, Divestment and Sanctions
- Criticism of the Israeli government
- Israel lobby in the United States
- Jewish lobby
- Projects working for peace among Arabs and Israelis
- Pro-Palestine lobby in the United States
