= Pro-Palestine lobby in the United States =

Pro-Palestine American individuals and groups

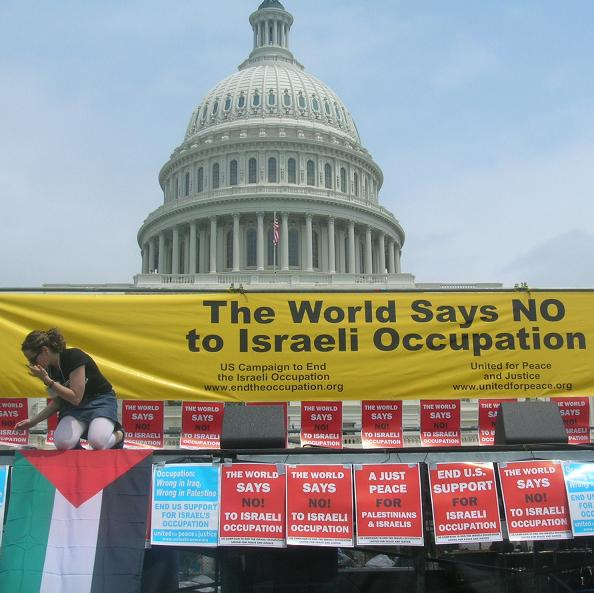
"The World Says No to Israeli Occupation" rally, June 10, 2007, at U.S. Capitol, sponsored by the US Campaign to End the Israeli Occupation (now the US Campaign for Palestinian Rights) and United for Peace and Justice.

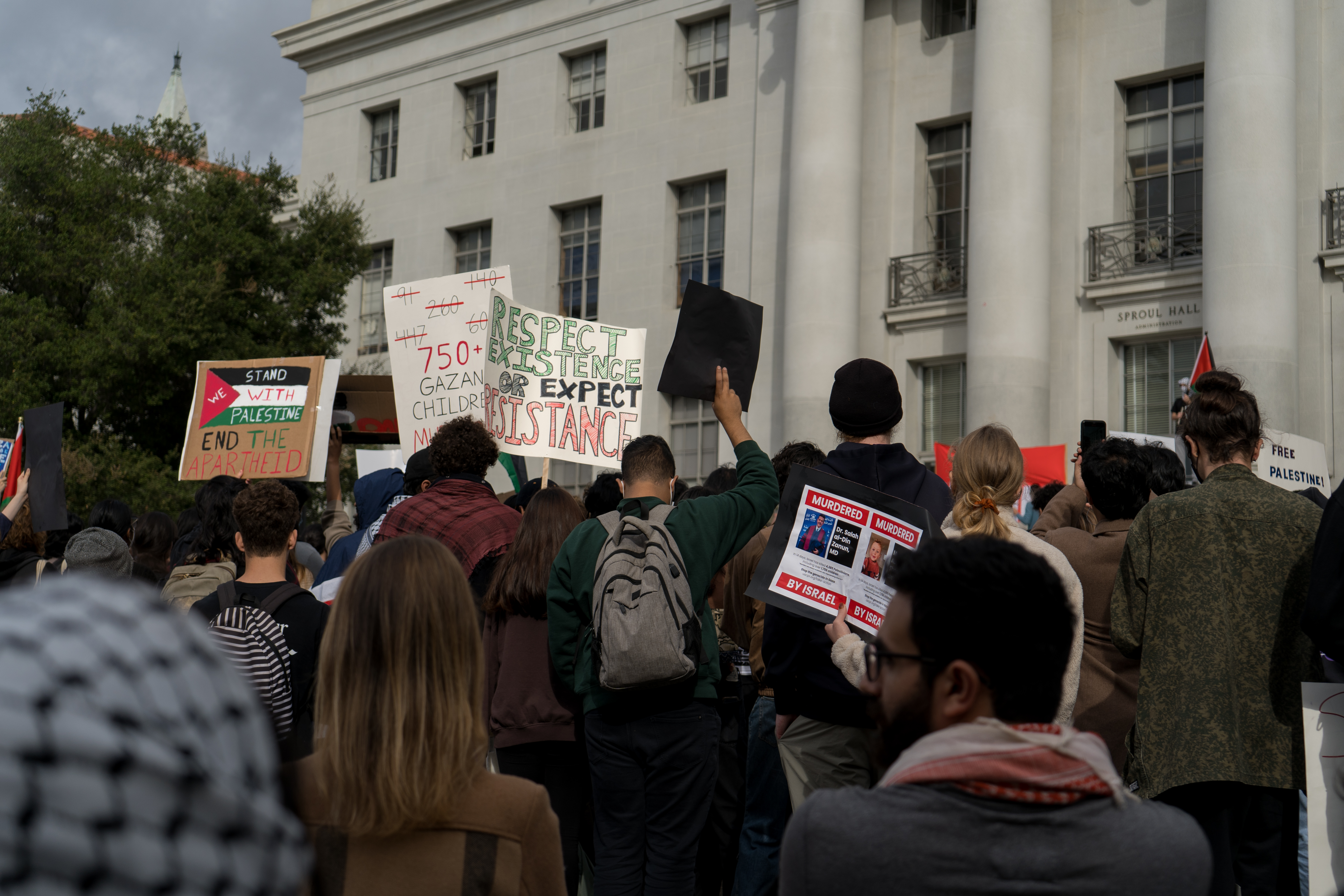
Protesters have made signs to use at a pro-Palestinian protest at UC Berkeley in 2023.

The pro-Palestine lobby in the United States is organized by a number of pro-Palestinian advocacy groups seeking to influence the United States government, institutions, and citizens to actively oppose Israel's occupation of the Palestinian territories, many of them members or cooperating with the U.S. Campaign for Palestinian Rights. These organizations include peace and anti-war, human rights, anti-Zionist, and Arab- and Muslim-American groups. Groups against occupation also include Jewish Voices for Peace and Students for Justice in Palestine, among others. Their tactics include education, protest, civil disobedience, and lobbying.

== History ==
Activism and public relations campaigns in the U.S. on behalf of Palestinian rights have existed since at least the Balfour Declaration in 1917. Arab-American advocates such as Fuad Shatara sought to bring the Palestinian cause to American attention through publications, engagement with the popular press, and the establishment of organizations such as the Palestine Anti-Zionism Society, later renamed the Palestine National League and subsequently the Arab National League. In April 1922, two Palestinian Arab advocates testified before the American Congressional Committee on Foreign Affairs in hearings about the Balfour Declaration and the British Mandate.

Another wave of major political activism against occupation emerged in the wake of the Six-Day War when Israel conquered the West Bank, Gaza and the Golan Heights from Jordan, Egypt, and Syria. In general, the pro-Israel lobby in the United States is significantly stronger than the pro-Palestine lobby and enjoys bipartisan support on the federal level, especially in the wake of the 2023 Hamas-led attack on Israel. As a result, pro-Palestinian organizations have focused more on grassroots organization, influencing elected officials in state and local levels, and cooperating with other social justice organizations. Much of the advocacy has since centered the BDS movement, which was created in 2005. During the 2023 war in Gaza, pro-Palestinian groups have focused on lobbying, organizing, and protesting for a ceasefire and reducing the Gaza blockade.

== Critics ==
Michael Lewis, director of Policy Analysis for the American Israel Public Affairs Committee criticizes a number of anti-occupation groups, contending that their goals are "to drive a wedge between the U.S. government and Israel; to undermine public and government support for Israel in the United States, and (especially since the 1973 war) to bring about a halt in American governmental aid to Israel."

In his book In the Trenches: Selected Speeches and Writings of an American Jewish Activist, David A. Harris, executive director of the American Jewish Committee says Israel must explain "how the occupation came about" and dismisses as "buzzwords" Palestinians attempts to gain sympathy as an occupied people.

== See also ==
- Anti-Israel lobby in the United States – American organizations that oppose relations between the U.S. and Israel
- Anti-Occupation Bloc – Israeli political alliance
- Arab–Israeli peace projects
- Gaza war protest vote movements – Protest votes targeting the 2024 Democratic Party presidential primaries
- One-state solution – Proposed resolution of the Israeli–Palestinian conflict
- Palestinian right of return – Political principle within the Israeli–Palestinian conflict sphere
- Two-state solution – Proposed diplomatic solution for the Israeli–Palestinian conflict
