= Palestine Media Watch =

- Available in: English
- Founded: 2000
- Commercial: No
- Current status: inactive

Palestine Media Watch (PMWATCH) was an organization established in October 2000 that monitored the U.S. mainstream media's coverage of the Israeli–Palestinian conflict and mobilized against what it deemed to be anti-Palestinian or pro-Israel bias in the coverage of the conflict. The organization focused mainly on issuing letter-writing action calls and publishing reports analyzing coverage. According to the group's founder, Ahmed Bouzid, "There's a paradigm we're trying to change: that Israelis are defending themselves and the Palestinians are attacking, and when the Israelis do something it must be a mistake or an act of self-defense." The organization's website has not been active since about 2009. The organization was the subject of a PhD dissertation by Robert Lyle Handley from the University of Texas, Austin, titled, "Palestine Media Watch and the U.S. News Media: Strategies for Change and Resistance."

== See also ==
- Palestinian Media Watch
- Media coverage of the Arab-Israeli conflict
- American Task Force on Palestine
- American Palestine Public Affairs Forum
- Pallywood
