= AMEU =

AMEU may refer to:

- African Methodist Episcopal University
- Alma Mater Europaea
- Americans for Middle East Understanding
