= The Arab Lobby =

2010 book by Mitchell Bard

The Arab Lobby: The Invisible Alliance That Undermines America's Interests in the Middle East
- Author: Mitchell Bard
- Language: English
- Subject: Politics
- Publisher: Harper, Broadside Books
- Publication date: August 31, 2010
- Publication place: United States
- Pages: 432
- ISBN: 9780061726019
- OCLC: 419859796
- Dewey Decimal: 324.4089 B
- LC Class: JK1118 .B28 2010

The Arab Lobby: The Invisible Alliance That Undermines America's Interests in the Middle East is a book written by Mitchell Bard, the head of the American-Israeli Cooperative Enterprise and the director of the Jewish Virtual Library, published in August 2010. It was written in response to John Mearsheimer and Stephen Walt's bestselling albeit controversial The Israel Lobby and U.S. Foreign Policy, which focused on the role of the Israel lobby in shaping U.S. foreign policy in a pro-Israel direction.

== Reception ==
It was reviewed positively by several conservative and pro-Israeli news media and groups including Ynetnews, Tablet Magazine, the Christian Broadcasting Network, and the Scholars for Peace in the Middle East. Kirkus Reviews praised Bard for identifying the "malign influence of the Arab lobby—specifically that of Saudi Arabia—on U.S. government policy".

Harvard University law professor Alan Dershowitz also gave The Arab Lobby a positive review in The Daily Beast. The Jewish Political Studies review characterized the book as an:

in-depth examination of the powerful anti-Israeli pressure group that has been pushing its policies in Washington for more than sixty-five years, often from within the State Department itself. The book explains the backgrounds and motives of these lobbyists, many of whom were former diplomats, oil company executives, high-priced lawyers, and public relations spinmeisters.

The book was described as "propaganda" containing "noise and the falsification of facts" in a 2016 book by Dr. Dania Koleilat Khatib. It was also criticized in a Newsweek article by R.M. Schneiderman which was later reproduced in The Daily Beast, who stated that: "Apparently anyone who criticizes Israel is part of a nefarious "Arab Lobby", or is an "Arabist" who has "gone native" and noted that the book is "Lightly footnoted and chock-full of offensive innuendo". Schneiderman explained:

From the get-go, Bard undermines his own thesis. "In some ways the term Arab lobby is a misnomer," he writes. And indeed, what Bard is really talking about are two separate groups: a Saudi Arabian lobby and a pro-Palestinian lobby. Do these groups have some power? Yes, especially the former, because of the oil issue. But if Bard set out to show the pernicious influence of "the Arab lobby", what he really offers is a litany of examples of AIPAC outflanking the pro-Saudi and pro-Palestinian lobbies.

== See also ==
- Arab lobby in the United States
