= Veteran Intelligence Professionals for Sanity =

American organization founded in 2003

- Washington, D.C.
- Formation: February 2003
- Type: Non-profit

Veteran Intelligence Professionals for Sanity (VIPS) is a group of former officers of the United States Intelligence Community formed in January 2003. In February 2003, the group issued a statement accusing the Bush administration of misrepresenting U.S. national intelligence information in order to push the US and its allies toward that year's US-led invasion of Iraq. The group issued a letter stating that intelligence analysts were not being heeded by policy makers. The group initially numbered 25, mostly retired analysts.

The group has later been implicated in support for Russian propaganda regarding the Russian interference in the 2016 United States elections and support for the debunked conspiracy theory that Seth Rich and the DNC, not hacking by the Russians, was responsible for the leak of stolen DNC emails. There has also been speculation that VIPS, and in particular William Binney and Robert David Steele, may have been involved in recruiting the networks that became QAnon. Leonid Bershidsky wrote that in spite of favorable coverage in 2003, by 2017 VIPS was only promoted by "non-mainstream publications that are easy to accuse of being channels for Russian disinformation".

== Founding and Current members ==
Members in 2004 included founder Ray McGovern, a former CIA analyst, as well as Patrick Eddington, Philip Giraldi, Larry C. Johnson, David MacMichael, Jesselyn Radack, Scott Ritter and others. Ray McGovern, a member of the VIPS steering committee, said VIPS had 35 members as of March 2004. A year earlier, the group had 25 members.

As of March 2024, the current members include, William Binney, Dick Black, Marshall Carter-Tripp, Bogdan Dzakovic, Graham E. Fuller, Philip Giraldi, Matthew Hoh, James George Jatras, Larry C. Johnson, John Kiriakou, Karen Kwiatkowski, Douglas Macgregor, Ray McGovern, Elizabeth Murray, Todd E. Pierce, Pedro Israel Orta, Scott Ritter, Coleen Rowley, Lawrence Wilkerson, Sarah G. Wilton, J. Kirk Wiebe, Robert Wing, and Ann Wright.{{unreliable inline}

== Foundation: The Iraq war and the February 2003 memo ==
On February 7, 2003, on the eve of the Iraq War, VIPS released a "Memorandum for The President" criticizing U.S. Secretary of State Colin Powell's speech before the United Nations (UN), and warning against "a war for which we see no compelling reason and from which we believe the unintended consequences are likely to be catastrophic". }}

VIPS followed up with ten further memos throughout 2003 and early 2004, "assessing what the Bush administration knew about Iraq before, during, and after the war, and how that intelligence has been used–and misused".

In May 2003, The New York Times columnist Nicholas D. Kristof said that widespread outrage among intelligence professionals had led to the establishment of VIPS. After CIA chief weapons inspector David Kay announced in 2004 that no stockpiles of weapons of mass destruction could be found in Iraq, Michael W. Robbins opined in the magazine Mother Jones that VIPS "produced some of the most credible, and critical, analyses of the Bush Administration's handling of intelligence data in the run-up to the March 2003 invasion of Iraq".

Two members, Bill and Kathleen Christison, resigned from the group in July 2003 following a VIPS open letter calling for the resignation of American Vice President Dick Cheney. In an open letter explaining their resignation, they said VIPS should write about policies and actions rather than personalities, and they wanted to avoid Cheney becoming a scapegoat which would end calls for further change to the Bush administration's foreign policy. They also said the memo included statements that "diminish VIPS' credibility and open it to charges of the very kind of truth-stretching that it is trying to combat". They said VIPS must be scrupulous since it is made up of "retired intelligence officers without firsthand inside information".

== Israeli influence: The August 2010 memo ==
On August 3, 2010, VIPS publicly released another memorandum for the President claiming that the government of Israel has a record of deceiving the U.S. government and estimated that Israel would unilaterally attack Iran "as early as this month". The letter also alleges that the "Likud Lobby" has disproportionate influence on U.S. policy, giving the example of a visit to Israel by Senators John McCain, Lindsey Graham and Joseph Lieberman.

== Chemical weapons in Syria ==
After the Ghouta chemical attack in Syria, VIPS issued an "open letter" to President Barack Obama stating that "former co-workers" and "numerous sources in the Middle East" had informed them that Syrian government forces were not responsible for the attack, contrary to the position of the US government and foreign intelligence agencies. The letter stated that there was instead "a strong circumstantial case" that the incident was a "pre-planned provocation by the Syrian opposition and its Saudi and Turkish supporters". The stated purpose of the letter was to urge President Obama against using the Ghouta incident to justify military action against the Syrian government because the signatories of the letter

are unaware of any reliable evidence that a Syrian military rocket capable of carrying a chemical agent was fired into the area [Ghouta]. In fact, we are aware of no reliable physical evidence to support the claim that this was a result of a strike by a Syrian military unit with expertise in chemical weapons.

Muhammad Idrees Ahmad, writing in The New Republic, commented on the take-up of the VIPS analysis by Michael Moore, WorldNetDaily and Pamela Geller. He also criticized the letter's reliance on anonymous sources, noting that the cited sources for the "most sensational claims" were conspiracy theory outlets GlobalResearch and InfoWars as well as Yossef Bodansky and MintPress News.

In April 2017, VIPS wrote a memo to President Donald Trump warning of escalation in the war in Syria and alleging that the Khan Shaykhun chemical attack had not occurred but rather, citing "Our U.S. Army contacts in the area," that "a Syrian aircraft bombed an al-Qaeda-in-Syria ammunition depot that turned out to be full of noxious chemicals and a strong wind blew the chemical-laden cloud over a nearby village where many consequently died". Signatories included Scott Ritter. According to Al Jazeera, "There is reason to doubt the existence of these “Army contacts“."

A September 2017 statement signed by five VIPS members, in response to dissenters within VIPS, said "in recent years we have seen “false-flag” attacks carried out to undergird a political narrative and objective—to blame the Syrian government for chemical attacks". The five members were William Binney, Skip Folden, Ed Loomis, Ray McGovern and Kirk Wiebe.

== Russiagate and the Trump presidency ==
=== The DNC hack ===
In December 2016, VIPS released a memorandum that defended Russia by criticizing allegations of Russian interference in the 2016 United States elections as "evidence-free". The memorandum asserted that the 2016 Democratic National Committee email leak was the result of an internal leak and not a Russian hack.

On July 24, 2017, VIPS released another memorandum, co-authored by William Binney, who later admitted he had been fooled by a Russian "fabrication" by the entity "Forensicator". The memorandum also argued that the DNC was not hacked, this time based on a forensic analysis conducted by the anonymous entity "Forensicator" with whom they communicated via retired IBM employee Skip Folden. This analysis was based on DNC files released by the Russian intelligence cutout Guccifer 2.0. The memo was released "over the substantive objections of several VIPS members".

According to Patrick Lawrence's article in The Nation, the memorandum argued that the metadata in these files were altered to add Russian fingerprints, and that file transfer rate proved they were transferred locally. Brian Feldman, writing in New York magazine, criticized the report for relying on "the 'metadata' of 'locked files' that only [Forensicator] had access to" pointing out that these phrases were meaningless. Feldman described the claims in Patrick Lawrence's article as "too incoherent to even debunk" and criticized its use of "techno-gibberish". The Nation's editor and publisher Katrina vanden Heuvel said she was "appalled" after Lawrence tweeted in support of the debunked conspiracy theory that Seth Rich was responsible for the leak. Vanden Heuvel said the story had nothing to do with Rich.

According to John Hultquist of FireEye:

"The author of the report didn't consider a number of scenarios and breezed right past others. It completely ignores all the evidence that contradicts its claims." Rich Barger, director of security research at Splunk, pointed out that the VIPS theory "assumes that the hacker downloaded the files to a computer and then leaked it from that computer" but overlooks the likelihood that the files were copied several times before they were leaked, potentially creating new metadata each time. Barger's comments were echoed by other cyber-security experts.

The Guardian Project founder Nathaniel Freitas independently reviewed Lawrence's article on behalf of The Nation, concluding that while "the work of the Forensicator is detailed and accurate," it did not prove the conclusions VIPS and Lawrence derived from it. Freitas stated that the high throughput suggested by the relevant metadata could have been achieved by a hacker under several different scenarios, including through the use of a remote access trojan, and that the leak hypothesis also requires "the target server ... to be physically on site in the building": "If the files were stored remotely 'in the cloud,' then the same criticism of 'it is not possible to get those speeds' would come into play." In sum: "At this point, given the limited available data, certainty about only a very small number of things can be achieved."

"Forensicator" subsequently said that VIPS made "over-ambitious extrapolations" from their own claims. Robert Dreyfuss, a contributing editor for The Nation, said Freitas' review showed that Lawrence's article was "flat-out wrong" and should be fully retracted. Leonid Bershidsky, who was sympathetic to the VIPS allegations, wrote that, although VIPS had originally received favorable coverage in The New York Times in 2003, by 2017 they were only promoted by "non-mainstream publications that are easy to accuse of being channels for Russian disinformation".

Some VIPS members, describing it as a "problematic memo because of troubling questions about its conclusions", refused to sign the July memo, including Scott Ritter, Philip Giraldi, Jesselyn Radack and former NSA senior executive Thomas A. Drake. Drake said "Ray [McGovern]'s determination to publish claims he wanted to believe without checking facts and discarding evidence he didn't want to hear exactly reproduced the Iraq war intelligence failures which the VIPS group was formed to oppose."

The VIPS memos were promoted by Breitbart News and Fox News, leading Trump, who is known to get his news from those sources, to request Mike Pompeo to meet with VIPS's William Binney.

Duncan Campbell of Computer Weekly investigated the claims and found that the documents on which VIPS relied were fake, and tracked their source to a pro-Russian Briton. After checking the source material, Binney conceded that the Forensicator material was indeed a "fabrication".

=== Gina Haspel and QAnon ===
In March 2018, VIPS published a memo opposing the appointment of Gina Haspel as CIA director due to her alleged involvement in the CIA's torture program.

The Financial Times and Heavy have speculated that VIPS, and in particular William Binney and Robert David Steele, may have been involved in recruiting the networks that became the QAnon pro-Trump conspiracy cult.

== See also ==
- National Security Whistleblowers Coalition
- Sam Adams Award
