= Phyllis Bennis =

American writer, activist, and political commentator

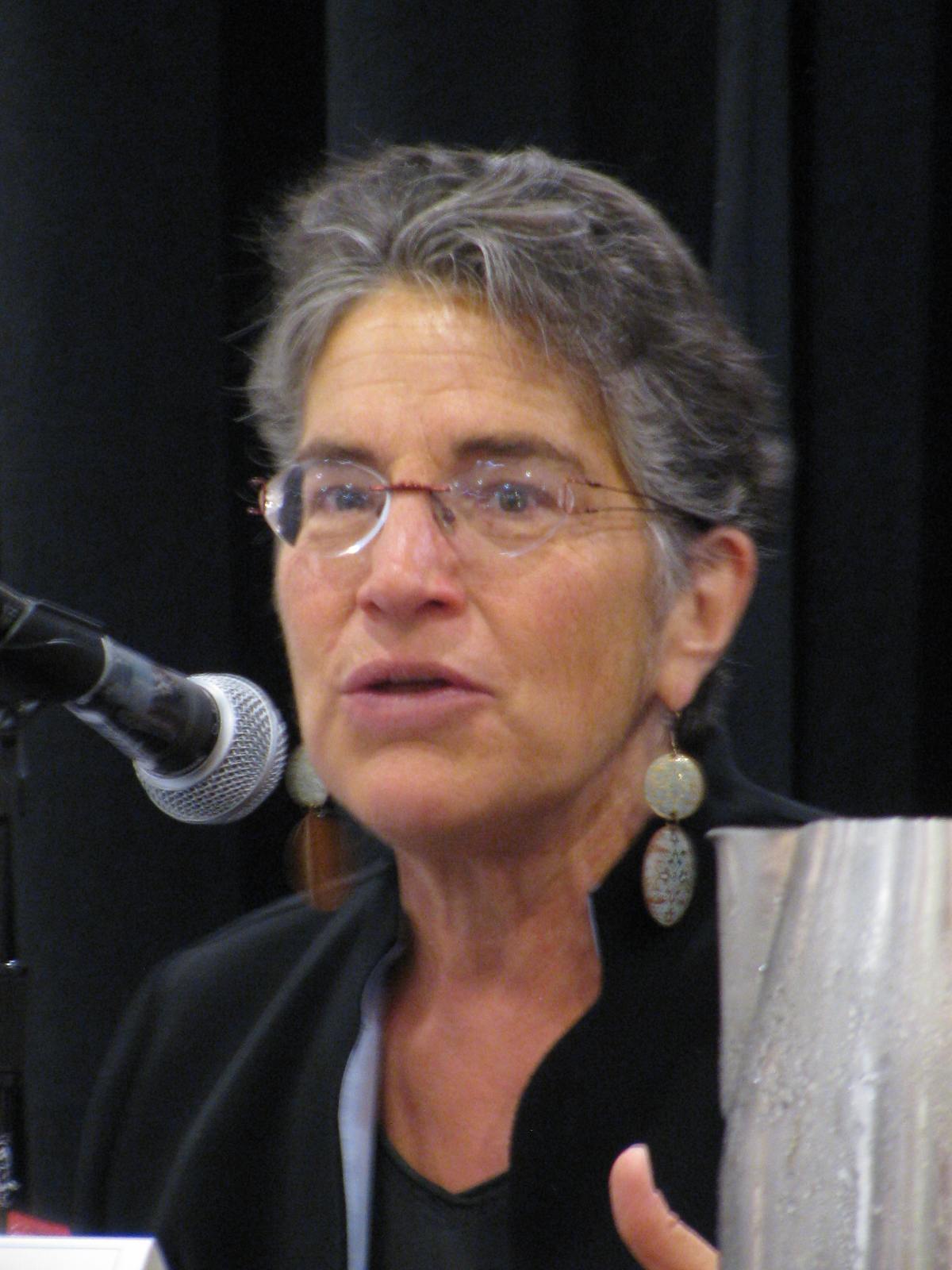
- Born: January 19, 1951 (age 75)
- Occupations: Writer, policy analyst, activist

Phyllis Bennis (born January 19, 1951) is an American Jewish writer, activist, and political commentator. Focusing mainly on issues related to the Middle East and the United Nations, she is a strong critic of Israel and the United States and a leading advocate of Palestinian rights.

She directs the New Internationalism Project at the Institute for Policy Studies.

== Early life and education ==
Phyllis Bennis was born to a Jewish family in Los Angeles on January 19, 1951. She grew up in Culver City.

== Career ==
Bennis is a left-leaning political activist who has been active in the Middle East since the 1970s and who covered the United Nations in the 1980s. In the early 1980s she was active in the Central America solidarity movement as a member of CISPES (the Committee in Solidarity with the People of El Salvador).

In 1987, Bennis witnessed the First Intifada and began to take a serious interest in pro-Palestinian advocacy. She made three additional trips to the Middle East in 1988 and 1989, and her experiences during this period led to a book, From Stones to Statehood: The Palestinian Uprising (1990), in which she describes the first two years of the Intifada and makes the case for a Palestinian homeland.

In 1999, Bennis accompanied a group of congressional aides to Iraq, examining the impact of U.S.-led economic sanctions on humanitarian conditions there.

Bennis is a fellow at the Institute for Policy Studies (IPS) in Washington, D.C., and of its offshoot, the Transnational Institute in Amsterdam. At IPS, Bennis directs the New Internationalism Project, which “works primarily on Middle East and United Nations issues,” focusing on “the U.S. wars in Iraq and Afghanistan, and the Israeli occupation of Palestine.” The project makes use of “education and activism” in an effort to change American policy and also seeks to “democratize and empower” the UN and free it of “U.S. domination.”

She is also a founding member of the U.S. Campaign to End the Israeli Occupation, which was established in 2002 during the Second Intifada, and currently serves on its steering committee. She is a leader of United for Peace & Justice and co-chairs the UN's International Coordinating Network on Palestine.

The IPS describes her as having worked with the UN “on several issues related to Palestine and the Middle East” and as advising “several top UN officials on Middle East and UN democratization issues.” The IPS adds that she “has played an active role in the growing global peace movement” since 2002.

== Views ==
Bennis has suggested that a solution to the Israeli-Palestinian conflict would begin with "the creation of a truly independent, sovereign, and democratic State of Palestine to be constructed on the 22 percent of historic Palestine that Israel occupied in 1967: the West Bank, Gaza Strip, and East Jerusalem." Under this arrangement, "Israel and Palestine, as equals, would jointly exchange full diplomatic relations" and "Israeli settlers would be given the option of moving to new homes inside Israel, or remaining in their homes as citizens of Palestine." In addition, "Jerusalem would be an open city, with two separate capitals within it: the capital of Israel in West Jerusalem, and the capital of Palestine in East Jerusalem." She also advocates for Palestinians' right of return to Israel.

Although she formerly supported a two-state solution as the ultimate means of resolving the Israeli-Palestinian conflict, Bennis has joined leaders of the Palestinian Boycott, Divestment, and Sanctions (BDS) movement in advocating the ultimate creation of a single bi-national state. In her manifesto, Understanding the Palestinian-Israeli Conflict: A Primer, Bennis champions the one-state solution, arguing that "creating a Palestinian state on only part of historic Palestine represents an historic injustice." She further claims that "Palestine has the potential to reach as high a technological and scientific level" as Israel, "largely through the intellectual capital of its young and highly educated population."

Bennis is a staunch opponent of what she regards as American imperialism and believes that actions should be taken to counter American and Western global hegemony. In the 1990s, she opposed US-led sanctions against Iraq and the US war on Iraq. In the early 2000s, she came out strongly against the invasions of Iraq and Afghanistan, and has supported anti-American movements in those countries. Deploring what she sees as the excessive influence of the US at the UN, she has argued that the international organization "desperately needs reform," and she blames the failure to implement reform on the "anachronistic" determination of US and other Security Council permanent members "to orchestrate the post-war world."

According to the Anti-Defamation League, Bennis "has repeatedly accused the 'Israel lobby' of pushing for a war against Iran" and "is often critical of Israel, including referring to Israel as an 'apartheid' and 'pariah' state." The ADL noted that in her 2008 primer, Iran in the Crosshairs: How to Prevent Washington's Next War, Bennis "defends Iran and challenges White House concerns that Iran intends to build nuclear weapons, going so far as to argue that Iranian President Mahmoud Ahmadinejad's calls to 'wipe Israel off the map' were misinterpreted and that really, 'the threat is the other way around' because Israel is pushing for a war against Iran." The ADL also noted her conviction that the US position on Iran was shaped by "Israel's powerful lobbies."

Bennis celebrated a Washington, D.C., march called "One Nation Working Together," held in 2010 and sponsored by a coalition of organizations including the NAACP, the SEIU, the AFL-CIO, the National Council of La Raza, the Center for Community Change, and the US Students Association. The "uniting issue" was jobs, with placards reading “Jobs Not War" indicating "the connection between our out of control military budget...and the jobs crisis."

Bennis opposed Western intervention in Libya in a March 2011 article for Al-Jazeera, questioning its credibility and saying that it threatened "the Arab Spring." Bennis argued in Al-Jazeera in August 2011 that if rebel leaders in Libya wished to be successful, they would have to stop being dependent on the US and NATO. She made similar arguments about Syria in 2012, saying that it was important "to make sure the U.S. is kept out of Syria militarily" because US military involvement could only "lead to greater civilian casualties."

She described ousted Egyptian President Hosni Mubarak's August 2011 trial as "the iconic emblem of the Arab Spring: a repressive US-backed dictator, suddenly brought down by popular mobilization and displayed behind bars in the defendants' cage of a Cairo courtroom."

Bennis argued in a September 2011 article for Al-Jazeera that the world was not changed by the September 11 attacks but by "the events of September 12, when the George W. Bush administration made the decision to take the world to war," a decision whose consequences, in her view, continue "to threaten the world's security and shred US democracy."

Noting the simultaneous exchange and release by Hamas of Israeli soldier Gilad Shalit and by Israel of 1,027 Palestinian prisoners, Bennis argued in an October 2011 article for Al-Jazeera that the disparity in numbers reflected the "control Israel wields over the occupied Palestinian population": while Hamas "control[s] the life of exactly one Israeli, a captured soldier," Israel "directly maintains power over the lives of thousands of Palestinian prisoners." To Bennis, Israel's holding of Palestinian prisoners is not about addressing genuine security threats but about "demoralis[ing]" Palestinians and "undermin[ing] the family unity that provides the crucial basis for Palestinians' sumud, or steadfastness, in resisting occupation."

In a January 2013 article for Al-Jazeera, Bennis described as "unsurprising" Israel's imprisonment of Richard Falk, UN Special Rapporteur for Human Rights in the Occupied Palestinian Territory, in December 2008, given that "Israel has for years responded with outrage to human rights criticism and, with US backing, has increasingly directly repudiated UN authority and legitimacy." Describing Falk as "scrupulously fair," Bennis chastised Human Rights Watch for criticizing him and thus lending credibility to "the litany of false attacks" against him. In another January 2013 article, Bennis described Falk as one of "the most important international defenders of human rights in the occupied territories," and characterized criticism of him by Israel, the US, and Human Rights Watch as the results of "smear campaigns launched by UN Watch, a right-wing outfit in Geneva known for its anti-UN, anti-Palestinian, pro-Israel and anti-human rights agenda." When Bennis was placed on the shortlist to replace Falk, UN Watch opposed her candidacy and was in part responsible for her not being appointed. One of Bennis's colleagues, Fiona Dove, stated with respect to the withdrawn candidacy that "Phyllis Bennis was subject to scurrilous attacks by the Israeli press". UN Watch responded that "if quoting terror apologists' own words constitute "scurrilous attacks," we plead guilty" to having done so.

Bennis argued in January 2013 that the US could save money by raising taxes on corporations and the wealthy, ending subsidies on fossil fuels, and cutting military spending.

She cited US National Intelligence Estimates and reports by the International Atomic Energy Agency to argue in February 2013 that concerns about Iran's nuclear capability are outrageously exaggerated and that if "the threat of war still looms" it is not because of actual threat assessments, but because of "belligerent" politicians. "Even a theoretical future nuclear-armed Iran," she argued, "would not be a threat to the existence of Israel" but only "to Israel's longstanding nuclear monopoly in the Middle East." This, she maintained, "is the real threat motivating Israel's attack-Iran-now campaign."

Bennis mocked U.S. President Barack Obama in March 2013 for giving a speech on the West Bank that was full of "soaring language in which he urged justice, reminding the world that the occupation can't remain," even as he refused "to acknowledge any of the immediate realities on the ground — the Wall, the checkpoints, the occupation soldiers preventing Palestinians from moving within their own land." She also criticized Obama's support for a two-state solution, arguing that it "has been rendered essentially impossible by unchecked settlement expansion."

Bennis signed a 2013 statement calling the US war in Iraq "illegal and illegitimate" and "based on lies", and stating that bringing "democracy and freedom to Iraq... was never on the US agenda."

Bennis praised "Iraqi civil society" in April 2013, saying that it "has been in motion in extraordinary, impressive ways." Not only is it "non-violent," she said, but it has also "challeng[ed] the existence of a sectarian government system that was put in place by the United States at the very beginning of its occupation."

Bennis reacted to the appointment of John Kerry as Secretary of State by lamenting in April 2013 that "There is no indication Israel is any more willing than it ever was to stop violating international law and UN resolutions. There is no evidence that any of the 600,000 or so illegal settlers who are violating international law every morning just by getting out of bed, are at all worried about losing either their illegally built homes or their military protection and privileges guaranteed by the Israeli state. There is no sign the siege of Gaza is being canceled. And most important, there is no hint that the US is prepared to bring any pressure to bear on Israel to end any of those violations."

== Writings ==
Bennis is the author of nine books and the co-editor of two.

- From Stones to Statehood: The Palestinian Uprising (1990);
- Calling the Shots: How Washington Dominates Today's UN (2000);
- Before & After: US Foreign Policy and the September 11th Crisis (2003) [US Policy and the War on Terrorism, 2nd ed.];
- Challenging Empire: How People, Governments, and the UN Defy US Power (2006);
- Understanding the Palestinian-Israeli Conflict: A Primer (2009);
- Ending the Iraq War: A Primer (2009);
- Understanding the US-Iran Crisis: A Primer (2009);
- Ending the US War in Afghanistan: A Primer (2010);
- Understanding ISIS and the New Global War on Terror: A Primer (2015)

She is also co-editor of Beyond the Storm: A Gulf Crisis Reader (1991) and Altered States: A Reader in the New World Order (1993).

She has contributed articles to The Nation, the Baltimore Sun, New York Newsday, the Christian Science Monitor, the New York Times, the Washington Post, and USA Today, as well as in such publications as Znet, Electronic Intifada, From Occupied Palestine, Counterpunch, Palestine Monitor, and Tom Paine. Most recently, she has been a frequent contributor to Al-Jazeera.

== Media appearances ==
Bennis has been invited to deliver political commentary on TV and radio in the U.S. and abroad. Among the outlets on which she has been featured are Al Jazeera, CNN, the PBS NewsHour, MSNBC, Democracy Now on Pacifica Radio, Grit TV, the BBC, and NPR.

== Other professional activities ==
Bennis was featured in the 2007 award-winning documentary film Occupation 101.

Bennis has often spoken at conferences alongside Noam Chomsky. She has also participated in conferences sponsored by the Jerusalem-based Sabeel Ecumenical Liberation Theology Center, which preaches “replacement theology,” namely the idea that the role of the Jews as God's “chosen people” ended with the arrival of Christianity. In October 2006 she was a speaker at a Sabeel conference entitled “Ending the Silence: Voices from the Holy Land.”

Bennis was featured as a speaker at the 2012 New York Session of the Russell Tribunal on Palestine.

Bennis was a featured speaker at “Confronting the War Today,” a conference to reflect on the Iraq War as it approached its tenth year.

Bennis spoke at a memorial for Rachel Corrie on the tenth anniversary of her death in 2013.
