= Hussein Ibish =

Columnist on Middle Eastern affairs

Hussein Yusuf Kamal Ibish
- Born: 1963 (age 62–63); Beirut, Lebanon
- Education: UMass Amherst, Emerson College
- Occupation: Senior Resident Scholar at The Arab Gulf States Institute in Washington

Hussein Yusuf Kamal Ibish (Arabic: حسين يوسف كمال أيبش; born 1963) is a senior resident scholar at the Arab Gulf States Institute in Washington. He is a weekly columnist for The National (UAE), former columnist for Bloomberg, regular contributor to The Atlantic and The Daily Beast, and frequent contributor to many other U.S. and Middle Eastern publications. He has made thousands of radio and television appearances and was the Washington, DC correspondent for The Daily Star (Beirut). Many of Ibish's articles are archived on his Ibishblog website.

His most recent book is What's Wrong with the One-State Agenda? Why Ending the Occupation and Peace with Israel is Still the Palestinian National Goal (ATFP, 2009). Ibish was included in all three years (2011, 2012, and 2013) of Foreign Policy's “Twitterati 100,” the magazine's list of 100 “must-follow” Twitter feeds on foreign policy.

Ibish is the editor and principal author of three major studies of Hate Crimes and Discrimination against Arab Americans 1998-2000 (ADC, 2001), Sept. 11, 2001-Oct. 11, 2002 (ADC, 2003), and 2003-2007 (ADC, 2008). He is also the author of “At the Constitution’s Edge: Arab Americans and Civil Liberties in the United States” in States of Confinement (St. Martin's Press, 2000), “Anti-Arab Bias in American Policy and Discourse” in Race in 21st Century America (Michigan State University Press, 2001), “Race and the War on Terror,” in Race and Human Rights (Michigan State University Press, 2005) and “Symptoms of Alienation: How Arab and American Media View Each Other“ in Arab Media in the Information Age (ECSSR, 2005). He wrote, along with Ali Abunimah, “The Palestinian Right of Return” (ADC, 2001) and “The Media and the New Intifada” in The New Intifada (Verso, 2001). He is the editor, along with Saliba Sarsar, of Principles and Pragmatism (ATFP, 2006).

Ibish previously served as a senior fellow at the American Task Force on Palestine, and executive director of the Hala Salaam Maksoud Foundation for Arab-American Leadership from 2004 to 2009. From 1998 to 2004, Ibish served as communications director for the American-Arab Anti-Discrimination Committee.

== Background and education ==
Ibish was born in Beirut, Lebanon. He comes from an academic background: his father, Yusuf Ibish, was a Lebanese/Syrian who studied at Harvard University's Department of Government in the 1950s and was on the faculty of the American University of Beirut as a scholar of Islam. His father and mother were a devout Sunni Muslim and Anglican Christian, respectively, although he never embraced either religion, despite being a founding member of the Progressive Muslim Union. Ibish attended Emerson College, earning a Bachelor of Science degree in mass communications in 1986. He has a PhD in comparative literature from the University of Massachusetts Amherst.

== Career ==
- Senior Resident Scholar at the Arab Gulf States Institute in Washington 2015-present
- Senior Fellow American Task Force on Palestine 2004-2014
- Executive Director of the Hala Salaam Maksoud Foundation for Arab-American Leadership 2004-2009
- Communications Director for the American-Arab Anti-Discrimination Committee (ADC), 1998–2004
- Founding member of the Progressive Muslim Union (later resigned)

== Publications ==
- What's Wrong with the One-State Agenda? Why Ending the Occupation and Peace with Israel is Still the Palestinian National Goal. American Task Force on Palestine (ATFP), 2009
- "Hate Crimes and Discrimination against Arab Americans 1998-2000". American-Arab Anti-Discrimination Committee (ADC), 2001)
- "Hate Crimes and Discrimination Against Arab-Americans Sept. 11, 2001-Oct. 11, 2002" (ADC, 2003)
- "Report on Hate Crimes and Discrimination against Arab Americans: 2003-2007" (ADC, 2008)
- "At the Constitution's Edge: Arab Americans and Civil Liberties in the United States" in States of Confinement: Policing, Detention, and Prisons, Joy James, ed. New York: St. Martin's Press, 2000
- "Anti-Arab Bias in American Policy and Discourse" in Race in 21st Century America, Curtis Stokes, Theresa Melendez, Genice Rhodes-Reed, eds. East Lansing: Michigan State University Press, 2001
- "Race and the War on Terror" in Race and Human Rights, Curtis Stokes, ed. Michigan State University Press, 2005
- "Symptoms of Alienation: How Arab and American Media View Each Other" in Arab Media in the Information Age. ECSSR, 2005
- "The Palestinian Right of Return" (ADC, 2001)
- "The Media and the New Intifada" in The New Intifada, Roane Carey, ed. Verso, 2001
- Editor, Principles and Pragmatism. ATFP, 2006
- "Hussein Ibish (Close Friend) and Christopher Hitchens." One Last Lunch: A final meal with those who meant so much to us. Abrams Press, Erica Heller, ed. Abrams Press, 2020.
