= Larry C. Johnson =

American blogger and former CIA analyst

- Occupation: Business consultant
- Known for: commentator on national security topics; former intelligence officer of the U.S. Central Intelligence Agency
- Title: CEO and co-founder of BERG Associates, LLC
- Board member of: Co-founder of Veteran Intelligence Professionals for Sanity
- Website: sonar21.com

Larry C. Johnson is an American blogger, political commentator and former analyst at the Central Intelligence Agency. He is the co-owner and CEO of Business Exposure Reduction Group (BERG) Associates, LLC, and the co-founder of Veteran Intelligence Professionals for Sanity (VIPS).

== Background ==
Johnson worked at the CIA for four years as an analyst, then moved to the United States State Department's Office of Counterterrorism. In 1993, Johnson left government work to join the private sector, "going on to build a dual career as a business consultant and a pundit on intelligence issues". He has appeared on television programs such as The News Hour and Larry King Live, giving his commentary. He is known under the Foreign Agents Registration Act as registrant number 7487, and in 2024 worked for Alasriya Media Consultancy, a firm whose address is located in the United Arab Emirates and whose owner is an “Unknown foreign principal”.

== Views ==
=== Early 1990s to 2008 ===
In numerous writings and interviews in the late 1990s and early 2000s, Johnson de-emphasized the threat stemming from terrorism. In 1998, he commented on Osama bin Laden, saying that bin Laden was possessed by "hatred and craziness", and if left unanswered, "he would continue to terrorize Americans around the world. He has no compunction about killing women and children. He's a complete egalitarian in his murderous attitude." In later interviews (1999, 2000), Johnson said Americans exaggerated the threats stemming from bin Laden. In July 2001, two months before the September 11 attacks, Johnson wrote a New York Times op-ed titled "The Declining Terrorist Threat", arguing that "terrorism is not the biggest security challenge confronting the United States, and it should not be portrayed that way".

In 2003, Johnson said that while he did not condone torture, he suggested that a "sleep deprivation and reward system" might be useful for getting information from Khalid Sheikh Mohammed.

In May 2003, Johnson joined members of Veteran Intelligence Professionals for Sanity (VIPS) in condemning the manipulation of intelligence for political purposes.

Johnson became a strong critic of the Bush administration in May 2003 for its conduct of the war in Iraq and, a few months later, for its role in the outing of CIA operative Valerie Plame Wilson. In a July 2006 post at Daily Kos, Johnson harshly criticized ex-CIA analyst Michael Scheuer (calling him, among other things, "a vicious little prick") and called Israel's invasion of Lebanon "stupid."

After Robert Novak wrote a column identifying Valerie Wilson (the wife of former ambassador Joseph C. Wilson) as a CIA operative, the media invited Johnson to comment on the ensuing scandal because he had been a member of the same Career Trainee class as Valerie Wilson. For example, in October 2003, he appeared on Democracy Now! to discuss the Plame affair and told interviewer Amy Goodman that Valerie Wilson's cover should have been respected whether she was an "analyst" or a "cleaning lady", "if she's undercover she's undercover, period. If the media allows themselves to get distracted with those kinds of curveballs, they ignore the issue."

=== 2008 to present ===
==== Michelle Obama hoax ====
According to The New York Times, Johnson is "best known for spreading a hoax... in 2008 that Michelle Obama had been videotaped using a slur against Caucasians". On May 16, 2008, Johnson posted an item entitled, "Will Barack Throw Mama From the Train?" which alleged that a tape existed of Michelle Obama "railing against 'whitey' at Jeremiah Wright's church." Johnson claimed that Republicans were in possession of the tape and it "is being held for the fall to drop at the appropriate time." In a subsequent post, Johnson claimed that Obama's appearance had occurred when she was on a panel with Louis Farrakhan. He also explained that he himself had not seen the tape, but had spoken with "five separate sources who have spoken directly with people who have seen the tape." The Obama campaign's "Fight the Smears" website denied the rumor, saying, "No such tape exists. Michelle Obama has not spoken from the pulpit at Trinity and has not used that word." On October 21, 2008, Johnson said that, according to one of his sources, the McCain campaign "intervened and requested the tape not be used."

==== War crime fabrication against John Kerry ====
In 2013, Johnson falsely accused John Kerry of war crimes in Vietnam, alleging that Kerry had "raped some poor Vietnamese woman." To support his claim, Johnson used a YouTube video that contained audio clips from a 1971 debate on The Dick Cavett Show between John Kerry and John O'Neill. The original interview audio was altered to piece together words that Kerry spoke at different times during the debate, falsely making it sound as if he said, "I personally raped for pleasure." When the falsehood was exposed by a reader of Johnson's blog, Johnson deleted the article without apology.

==== Claim that British intelligence wiretapped Trump ====
In March 2017, Andrew Napolitano said on Fox & Friends that GCHQ, Britain's signals intelligence service, had wiretapped Donald Trump's 2016 presidential campaign on orders from President Obama. Johnson was the source for Napolitano's claim. Sean Spicer, President Trump's press secretary, repeated the claim. Fox News later disavowed the statement by Napolitano.

==== Pundit for Izvestia, Sputnik ====
Johnson defended Russia from allegations that it interfered in the 2016 presidential election. Since Russia launched its full-scale invasion of Ukraine in 2022, Johnson has made regular appearances on Russian media and expressed support for its war effort. He has been cited hundreds of times in pro-Kremlin Russian media, including Izvestia, Sputnik, and RIA Novosti.

==== Lavrov interview ====
In March 2025, Johnson was one of three media personalities invited to interview Russian Foreign Minister Sergey Lavrov in Moscow.

==== Trump nuclear football claim ====
On April 20, 2026, Johnson was a guest on a podcast hosted by Andrew Napolitano during the 2026 Iran war. He claimed that Donald Trump had attempted to access nuclear weapons launch codes during an emergency White House meeting, but that General Dan Caine, who is Chairman of the Joint Chiefs of Staff had intervened to prevent Trump from gaining access to the launch codes. The allegation went viral and was spread across many social media platforms. Newsweek magazine stated that "no credible news organization or government official has verified that nuclear launch authority was ever invoked" and Business Times wrote that "fact-checkers say there is no verified evidence that such an incident occurred." The UK edition of the International Business Times observed that "Unverified claims about nuclear decision-making carry real weight in a live conflict."
