= They Dare to Speak Out =

1985 book on pro-Israeli lobbying in the USA

- Author: Paul Findley
- Language: English
- Publisher: Lawrence Hill
- Publication date: 1985
- ISBN: 9780882081793

They Dare to Speak Out: People and Institutions Confront Israel's Lobby is a book by former US Representative Paul Findley, written in 1985. The book examines Israel and the Israel lobby and the degree of control they have over the United States government, based on his experience representing the State of Illinois in the United States House of Representatives. Findley focuses on individuals who have stood up to the pro-Israel forces and brings out their statements and observations on the Middle East and US foreign policy toward Israel.

== Reception ==
The book was a Washington Post bestseller and a review in the Washington Post stated that the book's "message is straightforward and valid: Israeli influence in the United States, including in the inner sanctums of government, is very strong." The New York Times, in a review by Adam Clymer, noted that Findley had been defeated by "a combination of an able opponent, the recession, redistricting and a heavy infusion of money from pro-Israel political action committees" and described the book as "an angry, one-sided book that seems often to be little more than a stringing together of stray incidents".

The Christian Science Monitor's review stated that "Findley examines the history of America's lopsided official attitude toward the Middle East, a score of the most egregious examples of AIPAC's behavior, and the effect of all of this on public debate and policy. Because of his access to highly placed government officials, Findley's book contains a wealth of original statements and observations from William Fulbright, Spiro Agnew, Philip Klutznick, George Ball, Zbigniew Brzezinski, and the Rev. Jesse Jackson and many other prominent figures, speaking on the record and off."

== See also ==
- Israel lobby in the United States
