= Fox Lake, Montana =

- CDP
- Location of Fox Lake, Montana
- Coordinates: 47°41′11″N 104°37′24″W
- Country: United States
- State: Montana
- County: Richland

Area
  - Total: 5.66 sq mi (14.67 km^{2})
  - Land: 4.17 sq mi (10.81 km^{2})
  - Water: 1.49 sq mi (3.86 km^{2})
- Elevation: 2,356 ft (718 m)

Population (2020)
  - Total: 231
  - Density: 55.3/sq mi (21.36/km^{2})
- Time zone: UTC-7 (Mountain (MST))
  - Summer (DST): UTC-6 (MDT)
- Area code: 406
- GNIS feature ID: 2408254

Fox Lake is a census-designated place (CDP) in Richland County, Montana, United States. As of the 2020 census, Fox Lake had a population of 231.

== History ==
Within the CDP, as well as the settlement of Fox Lake, is located the settlement of Lambert. Lambert was built as a station stop along the Great Northern Railway branch line extending west from Sidney, Montana. A post office opened at Lambert on November 7, 1910. It was originally named Fox Lake after a nearby lake. The name changed to Lambert on March 13, 1914, under postmaster Edmund Bronson.

== Geography ==
Fox Lake is located 21 miles (34 km) west of Sidney on Montana Highway 200 near the Fox Lake Wildlife Management Area.

According to the United States Census Bureau, the CDP has a total area of 5.7 square miles (14.8 km^{2}), of which 4.2 square miles (10.9 km^{2}) is land and 1.5 square miles (3.9 km^{2}) (26.14%) is water.

== Demographics ==
Historical population
| Census | Pop. | Note | %± |
|---|---|---|---|
| 2000 | 157 | | — |
| 2010 | 158 | | 0.6% |
| 2020 | 231 | | 46.2% |
U.S. Decennial Census

As of the census of 2000, there were 157 people, 58 households, and 41 families residing in the CDP. The population density was 37.3 inhabitants per square mile (14.4/km^{2}). There were 64 housing units at an average density of 15.2 per square mile (5.9/km^{2}). The racial makeup of the CDP was 98.73% White, and 1.27% from two or more races. Hispanic or Latino of any race were 1.27% of the population.

There were 58 households, out of which 46.6% had children under the age of 18 living with them, 63.8% were married couples living together, 3.4% had a female householder with no husband present, and 29.3% were non-families. 29.3% of all households were made up of individuals, and 15.5% had someone living alone who was 65 years of age or older. The average household size was 2.71 and the average family size was 3.39.

In the CDP, the population was spread out, with 36.9% under the age of 18, 2.5% from 18 to 24, 31.2% from 25 to 44, 17.2% from 45 to 64, and 12.1% who were 65 years of age or older. The median age was 30 years. For every 100 females, there were 101.3 males. For every 100 females age 18 and over, there were 94.1 males.

The median income for a household in the CDP was $31,000, and the median income for a family was $36,667. Males had a median income of $21,250 versus $19,250 for females. The per capita income for the CDP was $14,443. About 11.4% of families and 16.2% of the population were below the poverty line, including 27.7% of those under the age of eighteen and none of those 65 or over.

== Education ==
Lambert Public Schools, Districts 4 and 86, operates an elementary, a junior, and a senior high school with a total student enrollment of 90 students in the community. For the purpose of inter-school athletic competition, the Montana High School Association classifies Lambert as a Class C school. The mascot for Lambert Public School athletic teams is the Fusion.

== Notable people ==
- Eugene K. Bird, Director of the Spandau prison
- Donald Grant Nutter, 15th Governor of Montana
