= American Charities for Palestine =

Charity based in Washington, DC, US

- Founded: Washington, DC (2007)
- Type: Non-profit, 501 (c) 3
- Services: Enabling safe giving for health care and education in Palestine.
- Website: http://www.americaforpalestine.org/

American Charities for Palestine (ACP) is a charitable 501 (c) (3) nonprofit organization based in Washington, D.C. that supports the development of Palestine's education and health sectors.

== History ==
American Charities for Palestine was established in June 2007. In August 2008, American Charities for Palestine signed a Memorandum of Understanding with the United States Agency for International Development (USAID) ensuring that all recipients of American Charities for Palestine donations in Palestine are fully vetted and approved by USAID. This is the first such agreement between USAID and any private organization, and it was described by USAID Administrator Henrietta Fore as a “historic step.”

=== Previous projects ===
Since signing its partnership agreement with USAID, American Charities for Palestine spearheaded three charitable initiatives worth more than $600,000, which benefited Palestinians in the West Bank.

In 2008, American Charities for Palestine, the Palestinian Ministry of Education, and USAID distributed 1,000 laptop computers that were donated by One Laptop per Child. The laptops were delivered to schools managed by the Palestinian National Authority (PA), United Nations Relief and Works Agency for Palestine Refugees in the Near East (UNRWA), and the private sector.

In 2009, American Charities for Palestine presented the Spafford Children’s Center with a contribution of $5,000 for the well-being of the children of Jerusalem.

Also in 2009, American Charities for Palestine partnered with CHF International and the Sheikh Mohammed Shami Foundation to initiate a $300,000 development project in the West Bank village of Beit Ur Al-Tahta, installing streetlights along all village roads and making structural improvements to the main road and that leading to the new girls’ high school already donated by the Shami Foundation.

== See also ==
- American Task Force on Palestine
- Ziad Asali
