= Philip Giraldi =

CIA officer

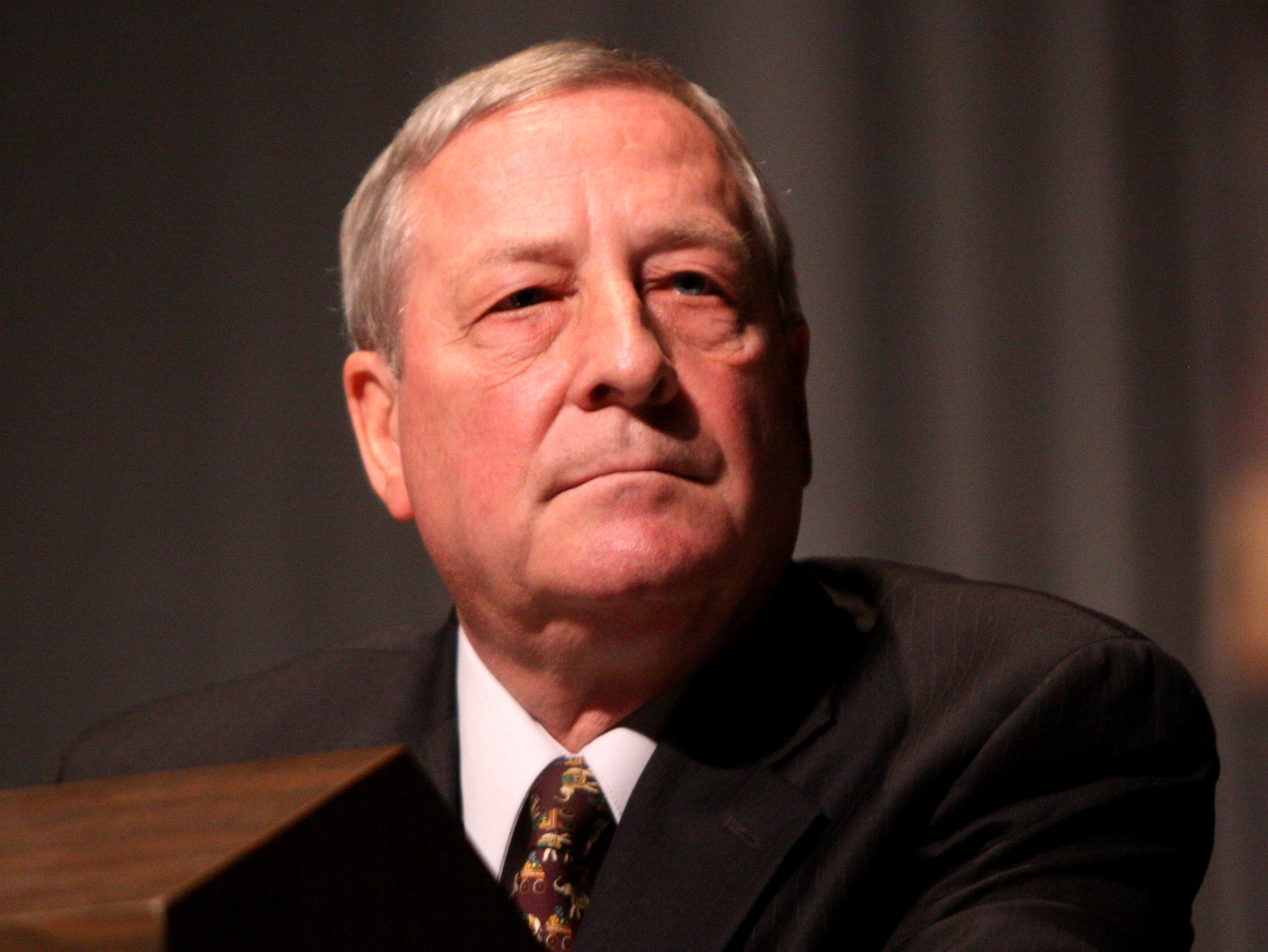
- Giraldi in 2011
- Born: c. 1946 (age 79–80)
- Education: University of Chicago, University of London
- Occupations: Former CIA officer, columnist
- Employer(s): Council for the National Interest, Veteran Intelligence Professionals for Sanity

Philip Giraldi (born c. 1946) is an American columnist, commentator and security consultant. He is the executive director of the Council for the National Interest, a role he has held since 2010. He was previously employed as an intelligence officer for the CIA, before transitioning to private consulting. Giraldi is a founding member and current member of Veteran Intelligence Professionals for Sanity.

Giraldi has been accused of antisemitism and Holocaust denial for his comments about Jews and the Holocaust.

== Education ==
Giraldi holds a Bachelor of Arts from the University of Chicago, and a MA and a Ph.D. in European history from the University of London. A native English speaker, he also speaks German, Italian, Spanish, and Turkish.

== Career ==
Girardi's 18-year period employed by the Central Intelligence Agency focused on counter-terrorism efforts. He served in numerous European and Middle Eastern theaters, including an appointment as the deputy base chief for the field office in Istanbul in the late 1980s. From 1989 to 1992, he was designated as the agency's senior officer for Olympic Games support, assuming the title of Chief of Base for the Barcelona summer Olympics. After leaving the CIA, Giraldi started a security consulting firm; and became a columnist, speaker, and commentator for numerous organizations and media-outlets.

He was a foreign policy adviser to Ron Paul during the 2008 presidential primaries.

Since 2010, Giraldi has served as the executive director of the Council for the National Interest, a non-profit political group that advocates for an end to U.S. aid to Israel and has the stated aim of providing independent analysis of U.S./Middle-Eastern policy, described by the Anti-Defamation League (ADL) in 2013 as one of their “Top Ten Anti-Israel Groups in the U.S.”. He is also the national security editor for The Unz Review, a webzine described by the ADL as "a forum for writers who demonize Israel" and by the Washington Post as "a website that says it provides a forum for 'alternative perspectives,' which happens to include anti-Semitic diatribes". The foundation of Ron Unz has made grants to Giraldi.

Giraldi has written columns on terrorism, intelligence, and security issues for the American Herald Tribune, The American Conservative, The Huffington Post, and Antiwar.com; as well as op-ed pieces for the Hearst Newspaper chain.

== Political commentary ==
=== The American Conservative ===
In August 2005, Giraldi wrote an article for The American Conservative that outlined his supposed knowledge of a contingency plan under development by the George W. Bush administration involving a potential nuclear attack on Iran. In another article that same year, Giraldi revealed that the outing of CIA officer Valarie Plame was part of a larger U.S. conspiracy to cover up the forgery of documents used to implicate Iraq in the attempted acquisition of nuclear material. The documents were a crucial component of the Bush administration's case to go to war with Iraq.

In 2013, Giraldi wrote an article for the website outlining a theory that the Syrian gas attacks in Damascus were staged by Middle Eastern actors seeking to frame the Assad regime. The theory was based on content from Infowars, GlobalResearch and MintPress.

=== Other outlets ===
In 2014, the Anti-Defamation League published a blog that identified Giraldi, among others, as a speaker at a National Press Club event that aired on C-SPAN, dubbed as the "National Summit to Reassess the U.S.-Israel Special Relationship," and purported to be sponsored by groups the ADL identified as being anti-Israel. At the event, it was reported that Giraldi spoke about allegations that Israeli spies celebrated while the Twin Towers fell on September 11.

=== Assertions about Jews and Israel ===
Noah Pollak wrote in Commentary magazine in August 2008: "In Giraldi’s world, scratching the surface of almost any event exposes the sinister machinations of international Jewry". He was accused in 2019 by Max Boot in The Washington Post of using the term "neocon" as a cover word for Jews.

In 2004, in a privately circulated newsletter co-written with Vincent Cannistraro, a retired CIA counter-terrorism chief, Giraldi said Turkish sources had reported that Turkey was concerned by Israel's alleged encouragement of Kurdish ambitions to create an independent state and that Israeli intelligence operations in the area included anti-Syrian and anti-Iranian activity by Kurds. They predicted this might lead to a new alliance among Iran, Syria, and Turkey which have Kurdish minorities. Giraldi speculated in 2008: "There are a number of possible "false flag" scenarios in which the Israelis could insert a commando team in the Persian Gulf or use some of their people inside Iraq to stage an incident that they will make to look Iranian, either by employing Iranian weapons or by leaving a communications footprint that points to Tehran's involvement."

In 2009, the London Times reported on an Iranian plan to experiment on a "neutron initiator" for an atomic weapon, Gareth Porter reported for Inter Press Service that Giraldi said that unnamed intelligence sources had told him that the document was in fact a fabrication, which Giraldi speculated was created by Israel. He claimed that Rupert Murdoch publications regularly disseminate false intelligence from the Israeli and sometimes the British governments.

In August 2010, Giraldi again referred to unnamed "sources in the counterintelligence community" in The American Conservative who had told him intelligence agents of Israel's Mossad were posing as representatives of the equivalent American agencies and visiting Arab and Muslim residents in New York and New Jersey. He alleged it was done as a "false flag" operation to help agents gain information about Iran, which they believed would not be forthcoming to Israeli agents. The Israeli embassy, the United States Department of Justice, and Giraldi all declined to comment for an article on the allegations in the biweekly New York Arab-community newspaper Aramica.

In September 2017, Valerie Plame encountered much criticism on Twitter when she retweeted Giraldi's Unz Review column "America's Jews are Driving America's Wars", and then when it was reported she had retweeted previous columns by Giraldi making claims about Jewish influence in American foreign policy, including "Why I Dislike Israel" (2014). In the 2017 article, Giraldi asserted American Jews pushed the United States into war with Iraq (it named Jews as "conduits for the false information that led to a war [with Iraq] that has spread and effectively destroyed much of the Middle East"), were fueling a war machine against Iran; and had a dual loyalty to Israel (he said Jews should not be put "into national security positions involving the Middle East, where they will potentially be conflicted"). He wrote: "Jewish groups and deep pocket individual donors not only control the politicians, they own and run the media and entertainment industries" and that. In the article he wrote that "those American Jews who lack any shred of integrity" appear on television they should be labeled, "kind-of-like a warning label on a bottle of rat poison". He concluded: "The only alternative is for American citizens who are tired of having their country's national security interests hijacked by a group that is in thrall to a foreign government to become more assertive about what is happening. ... We don't need a war with Iran because Israel wants one and some rich and powerful American Jews are happy to deliver." He accused American Jews of making false claims and taking politicians and the media down with them. Alan Dershowitz wrote for The Jerusalem Post: "In other words, Jewish supporters of Israel, like [Bill] Kristol and me, should have to wear the modern day equivalent of a yellow star before we are allowed to appear on TV." After the publication of the column, Giraldi said he had been fired for the Unz Review column by The American Conservative, where he had been a contributor for fourteen years.

In a May 2019 article for The Unz Review, Giraldi claimed Israel was connected with the September 11 attacks in 2001: "Israel, in spite of obvious involvement in 9/11, was not included in the 9/11 Commission Report despite the existence of an enormous Israeli intelligence operation freely working in the United States that was known to the FBI. ... [T]here are Israeli fingerprints all over the place, with cover companies and intelligence personnel often intersecting with locations frequented by the hijackers."

In a 2019 article for the Strategic Culture Foundation, Giraldi described the US as engaged in a deliberate campaign to start a war with Iran, based on a threat "falsified" and "contrived" by John Bolton in collaboration with Israeli leader Benjamin Netanyahu, as assertion described by analyst Mitchell Bard as "in the grand tradition of antisemitic conspiracy theories".

=== Claims about the Holocaust ===
A letter co-written by Giraldi was published by his alumni magazine in 1999. Near the end of the letter, Giraldi and his co-author wrote:

"Perhaps what is truly unique about the Holocaust is the ability of its exploiters to preemptively silence their critics. Surely within the University of Chicago community there must be many who recognize that the Holocaust industry has gone too far, that the Holocaust is far from being the central event of the century, and that its message of an exclusivity in suffering—serving to promote a Zionist agenda—is dubious at best."

Giraldi has been accused of Holocaust denial, as well as antisemitism. The Daily Beast reported that some of his antisemitic and Holocaust-denying articles for the Unz Review were copied by Iranian fake news sites.

=== Covid-19 ===
In a March 2020 article for The Unz Review, Giraldi claimed Israel had created the Coronavirus as a "biological weapon" to use against Iran. He said in the same month in an article for the Strategic Culture Foundation (described by the American Jewish Committee (AJC) as an "extreme-right propaganda website with a Russian domain") that "If one even considers it possible that the United States had a hand in creating the coronavirus at what remains of its once extensive biological weapons research center in Ft Detrick Maryland, it is very likely that Israel was a partner in the project". He continued: "It is difficult to explain why coronavirus has hit one country in particular other than China very severely. That country is Iran, the often-cited enemy of both the U.S. and Israel". This article was shared by Iran's PressTV and by Thai media outlets.
