= David MacMichael =

CIA analyst (1926–2022)

David Charles MacMichael (June 6, 1926 – May 16, 2022) was a contract employee of the Central Intelligence Agency (CIA) who served two years as an analyst. A ten-year veteran of the U.S. Marine Corps, he was a counter-insurgency expert in South-East Asia for four years. He also served as an analyst for the National Intelligence Council from 1981 to 1983.

== Early life and education ==
MacMichael was born in Albany, New York in 1926. He graduated with an MA and Ph.D. in History from the University of Oregon.

== Career ==
MacMichael reportedly resigned from the CIA in July 1983 because he felt the Agency was misrepresenting intelligence for political reasons. (Note: In a letter to a representative of the Department of Minnesota Veteran of Foreign Wars dated November 21, 1986, the CIA's Information and Privacy Coordinator stated: "We can advise you that David MacMichael has been officially acknowledged to have been a contract employee--as distinguished from a regular employee--of this agency whose employment was concluded at the end of a two year contract.") His public resignation from the Agency gave credence and notability to his vocal indictment of the Reagan Administration's policy toward Central America. He was considered the "key witness" in Nicaragua v. United States. The case was heard in 1986 before the International Court of Justice, which ruled that the United States had violated international law by supporting the Contras in their war against the Nicaraguan government and by mining Nicaragua's harbors. MacMichael also testified in front of Congress on this matter.

A former investigator for the Christic Institute, he was an outspoken critic of the Institute's reliance on conspiracy theory, arguing that the Institute "was eager, perhaps overeager, to demonstrate that this enterprise was responsible for everything since Cain slaying Abel." In July 2005, he testified at a special joint hearing of Congressional and Senate Democrats about the consequences of the Plame affair.

MacMichael was a founding member of Veteran Intelligence Professionals for Sanity (VIPS), as well as its predecessor Association of National Security Alumni and the Association for Responsible Dissent, and an outspoken critic of the Iraq War and the Bush Administration. He has participated in six documentary films from 1988 to 2003. Journalist John Pilger has described him as a "CIA renegade."

In August 2014 he was among the signatories of an open letter by the group Veteran Intelligence Professionals for Sanity to German chancellor Angela Merkel in which they urged the Chancellor to be suspicious of U.S. intelligence regarding the alleged invasion of Russia in Eastern Ukraine.

In September 2015 MacMichael and 27 other members of VIPS steering group wrote a letter to the President challenging a recently published book, that claimed to rebut the report of the United States Senate Intelligence Committee on the Central Intelligence Agency's use of torture. MacMichael died on May 16, 2022, at his home in Front Royal, Virginia, at the age of 95.

== See also ==
- Nicaragua vs. United States Details MacMichael testimony at the trial.
