= Craig J. Findley =

American politician (born 1948)

Craig J. Findley (born February 7, 1948) is an American newspaper editor and politician.

Findley was born in Pittsfield, Illinois. He went to school in Pittsfield and Falls Church, Virginia. His father was Paul Findley (1921–2019) who served in the United States House of Representatives, from Illinois, from 1961 to 1983. Findley graduated from Knox College in 1971. Findley and his wife live in Virginia, Illinois with their family and were the editors of the Gazette Newspapers in Cass County, Illinois. Findley served as a Republican in the Illinois House of Representatives in 1981 and 1982.

After the Cutback Amendment, Findley opted to run for an open seat in the Illinois Senate. Findley lost the general election to Richard Luft. After his loss, he went to work for Congressman Robert H. Michel as a staffer in the Congressman's Jacksonville, Illinois office.

After Michel's retirement in 1995, Findley became a legislative liaison for the Illinois Department of Transportation. That same year Findley was elected to the Lincoln Land Community College Board of Trustees. Findley has served as the board's chair on three occasions; 1997–1998, 2003–2005, and 2015–2017. He retired from the LLCC board in 2021.

In 2001, Findley was appointed to the Illinois Prisoner Review Board. The Prisoner Review Board is tasked with the consideration of cases of prisoners eligible for parole; setting conditions for parole and mandatory supervised release; revoking good conduct credit and suspending or reducing rate of accumulating such credit; and reviews recommendations for executive clemency. In 2017, Findley was reappointed the Chairman of the Illinois Prisoner Review Board for a term ending January 15, 2023. In January 2023, Governor J. B. Pritzker appointed Findley to serve as a member of the Illinois Firearm Owner's Identification Card Review Board. On March 7, 2024, his appointment was confirmed unanimously by the Illinois Senate.
