= Alison Weir (activist) =

American activist and writer

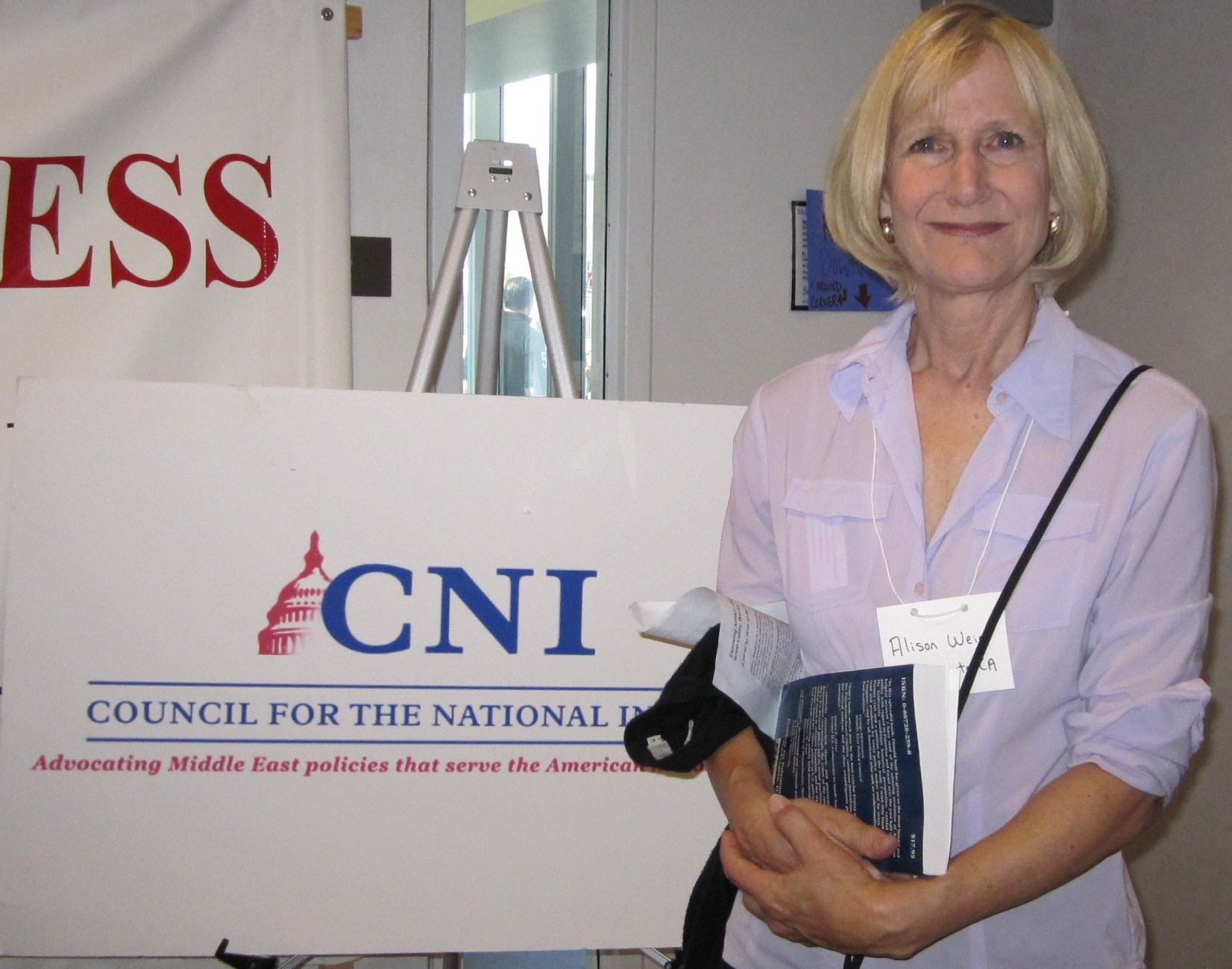
- Occupations: Activist and writer
- Known for: Founder of If Americans Knew; President of the Council for the National Interest

Alison Weir is an American activist and writer known for her interest in the Israeli–Palestinian conflict. She is the founder and executive director of the nonprofit organization If Americans Knew (IAK), president of the Council for the National Interest (CNI), and author of Against Our Better Judgment: The Hidden History of How the U.S. Was Used to Create Israel.

She is known as a media critic and Middle East expert and chronicles bias in U.S. media coverage of Middle East events.

== Activism and views ==
Weir traces her interest in the Israeli–Palestinian conflict to the autumn of 2000, when the Second Intifada began. At the time she was "the editor of a small weekly newspaper in Sausalito, California", and noticed that news reports on the conflict "were highly Israeli-centric". Wanting access to "full information", she "began to look for additional reports on the Internet". After several months, she decided that "this was perhaps the most covered-up story I had ever seen" and quit her job in order to visit the West Bank and Gaza, where she wrote about her encounters with Palestinian suffering and with the "incredible arrogance, cruelty, selfishness" of Israelis. After returning to the U.S., she founded If Americans Knew. Weir's official biography says her activism draws on her history of involvement in the American Civil Rights Movement, her work in the Peace Corps, and her childhood in a military family.

Weir has alleged that Israel's US supporters are responsible for involving America in wars. She has alleged that Nazi and Zionist leaders collaborated during World War II. According to Tablet, she has "complained about there being too many Jews on the Supreme Court".

Writing in CounterPunch, Weir said that Israel harvests Palestinian organs.

Weir has partnered with white supremacists and Holocaust deniers including Christian Identity leader and conspiracy theorist Clayton Douglas and American Free Press, both designated as hate advocates by the Southern Poverty Law Center. On Douglas' radio show, Weir "dismissed allegations that he was a racist, did not challenge his repeated assertions of Jewish control of the world, and did not protest when he played a speech by former Ku Klux Klan grand wizard David Duke." The anti-Zionist group U.S. Campaign to End the Occupation said that "Weir made little to no effort to challenge, confront, or rebut any of these views." She has also worked with the Nation of Islam.

Weir's writings include exhortations to action. In an article, she wrote: "Every generation has a chance to act courageously – to oppose the kind of injustice and unthinkable brutality that is going on in the Middle East right now. Or to avert our eyes, and remain silent."

Weir has written that "The Israeli-Palestinian conflict is central to grave events in the world—and in our nation—today." In writing about antisemitism, Weir has argued, "in reality, equating the wrongdoing of Israel with Jewishness is the deepest and most insidious form of anti-Semitism of all."

== Reception ==
The Anti-Defamation League (ADL) has called Weir "a prominent voice in the anti-Israel movement". According to The Forward, "Though influential in anti-Israel circles, Weir has been accused of animosity toward the Jewish state and antisemitism, including by the Anti-Defamation League. In a 10-page report, the ADL describes Weir as someone who 'employs anti-Semitic imagery' and portrays 'Israel and its agents as ruthless forces that control American policy.'"

Political analyst Spencer Sunshine criticized Weir for citing antisemitic writers. When asked if antisemitic authors such as Israel Shamir, Gilad Atzmon, and Kevin MacDonald were legitimate, she replied affirmatively and said people should read them for themselves. Sunshine also referred to Weir's position on the board of NewPolicy.org, a website which he said promoted the conspiracy theory Israel was behind the 9/11 attacks. He said that Weir had referred to "the significant role that Zionists played in pushing the U.S. into World War I" in a radio interview, which Sunshine later described as "antique antisemitism."

Some in the Palestinian solidarity movement have severed ties with Weir for "mobilization of 'blood libel' accusations" and "elevation of far-right ideas and relationships". In June 2015, Jewish Voice for Peace (JVP) stated that they chose not to work with Weir, on the grounds that "she has consistently chosen to stay silent when given the opportunity to challenge bigotry, which we find repugnant. There is a fundamental difference between engaging with oppressive beliefs in order to challenge them, and tacitly or directly endorsing those beliefs without challenge." JVP did not accuse Weir of holding anti-Jewish beliefs, but accused her of granting interviews to people it believed held such views and decried some of the websites that have reposted her writings. Weir responded in detail to the accusations, which provoked widespread debate among activists. The US Campaign to End the Israeli Occupation published a statement critical of Weir and If Americans Knew in August 2015. It was supported by the Rachel Corrie Foundation. The statement said that US government actions toward Israel were consistent with its support for racist, dictatorial and murderous regimes throughout the world. It accused If Americans Knew of whitewashing US government actions by treating its support for Israel as an aberration from its normally benevolent actions.

More than 2,000 activists signed an open letter supporting Weir, including former United Nations Special Rapporteur on the Palestinian Territories Professor Emeritus Richard Falk; founding member of Birzeit University's board of Trustees Samia Khoury; Palestine Rapprochement Center Director/ISM co-founder George Rishimawi; activists Hedy Epstein, Ann Wright, Arun Gandhi, Ray McGovern, Cindy Sheehan, Greta Berlin, Paul Larudee, Philip Giraldi and James Petras; American-Arab Anti-Discrimination Committee founder and former Senator James Abourezk; and many members of JVP itself. The letter stated that the undersigned were "dismayed by the recent unfounded attacks on one of the top organizations working on this issue, If Americans Knew, and its dedicated leader, Alison Weir", and believed that the accusations against Weir were "scurrilous and without foundation".

== If Americans Knew ==
Weir founded If Americans Knew (IAK) after her visit to the West Bank and Gaza Strip during the Second Intifada in 2001. Weir describes IAK as "an organization that provides information on topics of importance that are substantially misreported or unreported in the US media" with a primary focus on analyzing media coverage of Israel-Palestine. IAK was condemned for antisemitism by Jewish Voice for Peace, U.S. Campaign to End the Occupation and the ADL.

IAK, a 501(c)(3) nonprofit based in California, describes its mission as follows: "The Israeli-Palestinian conflict is one of the world's major sources of instability. Americans are directly connected to this conflict, and increasingly imperiled by its devastation. It is the goal of If Americans Knew to provide full and accurate information on this critical issue, and on our power – and duty – to bring a resolution."

On December 16, 2012, IAK placed an advertisement in The New York Times featuring four maps purporting to show the Palestinians' progressive loss of land to Israel between 1946 and 2010.

== Council for the National Interest ==
In June 2010, Weir was named to succeed Eugene Bird, the longtime leader of the Council for the National Interest (CNI).

CNI describes itself as seeking to "encourage and promote a U.S. foreign policy in the Middle East that is consistent with American values, protects our national interests, and contributes to a just solution of the Arab-Israeli conflict. It is CNI's goal to restore a political environment in America in which voters and their elected officials are free from the undue influence and pressure of foreign countries and their partisans."

== Recognition ==
In 2004, she became the first woman to receive an honorary membership in the Phi Alpha Literary Society. Weir has also won awards from the American Arab Anti-Discrimination Committee and the Council on American–Islamic Relations.

== Book ==
Weir is the author of Against Our Better Judgment: The Hidden History of How the U.S. Was Used to Create Israel, published in February 2014. Former US Senator James Abourezk called the book "a must for all Americans" in a review for the Washington Report on Middle East Affairs.
