= Americans for Middle East Understanding =

Organization

Americans for Middle East Understanding (AMEU) is an American 501(c)(3) nonprofit organization based in New York City. AMEU was founded in 1967 by people whose professions involved the Middle East and who believed that Americans were receiving biased information about the region. AMEU publishes a 16-page magazine called The Link on a bi-monthly basis, which is now in its 33rd year of publication. It also publishes leaflets about the Middle East, supports educational programs, sells books, donates to libraries, provides a speakers' bureau, subsidizes travel to the Middle East and provides teachers with educational material.

== Board of directors ==
The board of directors includes scholars, academics, diplomats, authors, editors, religious representatives and business people including many with direct experience in the Middle East. Talcot Seelye, former American ambassador to Syria and Tunisia, served on the board of directors. AMEU's current board of directors includes former American ambassador to Greece, Zimbabwe, and Mauritius, Robert V. Keeley and former representative Paul Findley.

== Palestinian advocacy ==
A 2004 article by Chana Shavelson on the pro-Israeli media watchdog, Committee for Accuracy in Middle East Reporting in America (CAMERA), AMEU is referred to as a "pro-Palestinian group." Neoconservative Laurent Murawiec, in his book, Prince of darkness: the Saudi assault on the West says: "Americans for Middle East Understanding, established in 1969, evolved into a major organization within the Arab lobby."
