= Fuad Shatara =

Politician

Fuad Isa Shatara (1892 – January 8, 1942) (Arabic: فؤاد عيسى شطارة) was a Palestinian-American physician known for his advocacy on behalf of the Palestinian cause in the United States. He was based in Brooklyn, New York and served as president of the Arab National League.

== Biography ==
Shatara was born in Palestine and naturalized as a U.S. citizen while at Harvard University. He was a graduate of the New York College of Physicians and Surgeons. He served on the medical staff of Cumberland Hospital for two decades.

=== Advocacy ===
He was a member of the Ramallah Young Men's Society, through which he helped organize demonstrations in New York, including a demonstration on Nov. 8, 1917 attended by five hundred Syrians to protest the Balfour Declaration.

Shatara was also a founding leader of the Palestine Anti-Zionism Society in New York alongside Arab-American contemporaries such as Habib Katibah. The organization was renamed as the Palestine National League in 1921, and subsequently, during the period of the 1936–1939 Arab revolt in Palestine, it came under another new title, the Arab National League, in order to better reflect coordination with other Arab Americans, particularly those involved at the time in the New Syria Party.

Shatara contributed to one of this organization's inaugural publications, a 1919 book in Arabic called "The Reconstruction of Palestine." The book focused on "Palestine's economic and social potentials and...the dangers represented by the Zionist project." He published other works throughout his career and has been referred to by scholar Hani J. Bawardi as an "accomplished author of Arab origin."

Shatara also participated in "panels, radio broadcasts, and debates with Zionists." Furthermore he engaged in "dialogue with American Jews who were opposed to political Zionism for religious reasons or who objected to the dispossession of the Palestinians," including Elmer Berger and Albert Einstein. Shatara testified before Congress against the Balfour Declaration and against U.S. approval of the British Mandate for Palestine. He was one of two Palestinian Arabs who testified before the American Congressional Committee on Foreign Affairs in hearings about the Balfour Declaration on April 18–21, 1922.

Shatara was appointed by the Arab leader Hussein bin Ali of the Hijaz (modern-day Saudi Arabia), as an official envoy to the United States in 1924. He has been characterized as having "tirelessly worked to help Americans understand the Arab cause."

Ultimately, "Shatara, who met with Haj Amin al-Husseini’s emissaries to the United States and attended two meetings of the German American Bund was hounded out of his medical practice." He later died by suicide.
