= American Task Force on Palestine =

Organization to promote the creation of a Palestinian state

- Founded: Washington, D.C., U.S. (2003)
- Type: Non-profit, non-partisan, 501 (c) 3
- Purpose: Israeli–Palestinian peace process, Palestinian statehood
- Website: http://www.americantaskforce.org/

The American Task Force on Palestine (ATFP) is an organization founded in 2003 to advocate that it is in the American national interest to promote an end to the Palestinian–Israeli conflict through the creation of a Palestinian state alongside Israel. It has not been active since 2016.

ATFP is funded entirely by its board of directors and supporters. It has never received funding from any government or government agency. ATFP's signed, audited financial statements are posted online on its website.

== History ==
The American Task Force on Palestine was founded in 2003 as the successor organization to the American Committee on Jerusalem (1995–2003.) Rashid Khalidi was president of the ACJ.

In early 2004, the task force helped promote and publicize the Geneva Accords in the United States. In November 2004, ATFP President Ziad Asali was a member of the United States delegation to the funeral of Yasser Arafat. He served as an official observer of the Palestinian Presidential elections in January 2005. On February 10, 2005, Asali testified before a full committee hearing of the House International Relations Committee on "the way forward in the Middle East peace process." Asali was a member of the team that monitored the Palestinian Legislative election in January 2006. In February 2006 ATFP issued its "Vision for the State of Palestine", first published in the New York Times.

In December 2006, a 10-member delegation from ATFP's leadership traveled to the region and held substantive meetings with top political leaders including Jordan's King Abdullah II, Palestinian President Mahmoud Abbas and acting Israeli Prime Minister Tzipi Livni.

On February 12, 2009, Asali testified at a House Committee on Foreign Affairs, Subcommittee on Middle East and South Asia hearing on the aftermath of the war in Gaza. At the hearing, ATFP also submitted an extensive 50-page report on the circumstances, aftermath and consequences of the war.

On March 4, 2010, Asali spoke before the Senate Committee on Foreign Relations on "Middle East Peace: Ground Truths, Challenges Ahead".

== Annual galas ==
In the fall of every year from 2006 through 2013, ATFP hosted galas in Washington DC celebrating the accomplishments of and honoring significant Palestinian Americans and hosting prominent keynote speakers. In fall 2014 it announced that it was cancelling that year's gala due to the prevailing pessimism among its supporters about the prospects for a two-state solution. At that time the organization's annual budget was approximately $1 million, and the galas typically accounted for some 50% of its fundraising.

On October 11, 2006, ATFP held its first annual in Washington, D.C., featuring keynote speaker Dr. Condoleezza Rice, also addressed by American of Palestinian descent Sen. John E. Sununu and Sen. Carl Levin. Rice told an audience of 500, “I believe that there could be no greater legacy for America than to help to bring into being a Palestinian state for a people who have suffered too long, who have been humiliated too long, who have not reached their potential for too long, and who have so much to give to the international community and to all of us. I promise you my personal commitment to that goal.“

== Positions ==
=== Right of return ===
Regarding the Palestinian Right of Return, the ATFP states on its website that "The right of return is an integral part of international humanitarian law, and cannot be renounced by any parties. There is no Palestinian constituency of consequence that would agree to the renunciation of this right. There is also no Jewish constituency of consequence in Israel that would accept the return of millions of Palestinian refugees... The challenge for the Israeli and Palestinian national leaderships is to arrive at a formula that recognizes refugee rights but which does not contradict the basis of a two-state solution and an end to the conflict."

== Humanitarian efforts ==
ATFP launched the Palestinian Humanitarian Fund appeal in May 2006. On January 23, 2007, ATFP launched a humanitarian medical program in the West Bank.

=== American charities for Palestine ===
In June 2007, members of the ATFP Board of Directors established a sister organization, American Charities for Palestine (ACP). ACP is pioneering a new approach for distributing secure donations to worthy causes that will help build both peace and Palestine. ACP is designated by the IRS as 501 (c) (3) nonprofit organization.

In August 2008, ACP signed a Memorandum of Understanding (MOU) with the United States Agency for International Development (USAID) ensuring that all recipients of ACP donations in Palestine are fully vetted and approved by USAID. This is the first such agreement between USAID and any private organization, and it was described by USAID Administrator Henrietta Fore as a “historic step.” ACP donors are therefore assured that their generosity will be distributed in full compliance with US law as well as reaching truly deserving recipients.

ACP focuses primarily on the fields of health and education. These two sectors are not only central to the immediate improvement of the quality of life for Palestinians, but also indispensable for laying the foundations of a viable future Palestinian state to live alongside Israel. In targeting these two sectors, ACP hopes to advance the cause of peace based on two states – Israel and Palestine – and to support efforts by the United States government to realize this crucial policy goal. In its humanitarian projects, ACP works directly with Palestinian and international charities, as well as USAID and Palestinian Authority agencies.

Since signing its partnership agreement with USAID, ACP has started three charitable initiatives benefiting Palestinians in the West Bank, with amounts totaling $605,000 in contributions.

ACP is committed to making a strategic impact on the quality of education and health care delivery to Palestinians. ACP's partnership with USAID has created a mechanism that reassures donors, vets recipients and provides accountability and transparency. This unique package of safeguards, partnerships and services is particularly suited to attract donors who have an interest in promoting peace and security. ACP believes there is an intimate connection between improving living conditions and providing hope and the reality of a secure peace between Israel and Palestine.

== Publications ==
In 2006, ATFP published a volume summarizing its efforts and positions to date, Principles and Pragmatism: Key Documents from the American Task Force on Palestine, edited by board member Saliba Sarsar, associate vice president of Monmouth University, and Hussein Ibish, a senior fellow at the task force. The task force had previously issued its “Palestine – Israel 101” power-point slideshow on the history of the conflict and prospects for peace in the region. ATFP has also created a brief video on the history of Palestinian Americans, “Snapshots of Palestinian Americans.”

In 2009, ATFP Senior Fellow Hussein Ibish published the book What’s Wrong with the One-State Agenda? (ATFP, 2009). It offers a critique from a pro-Palestinian point of view of the idea of creating a single state for all Israelis and Palestinians instead of the goal of ending the occupation and forging a negotiated peace agreement with Israel.

ATFP has also published numerous issue and policy analysis papers.

== Criticism ==
In a July 20, 2007, article published by The Electronic Intifada, Palestinian commentator Osamah Khalil called for a boycott of officials and institutions associated with the Palestinian Authority, "including diplomatic fronts like the American Task Force on Palestine, a group that boasts among its slim record of 'achievements,' sponsoring polo matches and hosting a speech by Secretary of State Condoleezza Rice." Khalil viewed the Palestinian Authority as fundamentally antithetical to the goal of Palestinian liberation.

In March 2005, dozens of organizations representing Palestinian refugee communities signed a statement in response to statements made by ATFP president Ziad Asali "declaring that various statements and false representations by the president of the Washington-based "American Task Force on Palestine" (ATFP) Dr. Ziad Asali nullifying the Palestinian right to return and demeaning the Palestinian and Arab people are reprehensible and entirely outside the consensus of our people." The statement alleged that "voices such as Asali's are part of a larger concerted effort to introduce a false veneer of moderation as a replacement for the legitimate inalienable rights of the Palestinian and Arab people, represented by their right to return, sovereignty and self-determination.".

In 2007, ATFP answered many of its most persistent criticisms in an issue paper addressing a wide range of attacks against the organization.

== Board of directors ==
- Ziad J. Asali, M.D.
- Naila Asali
- Husam Atari
- Jesse I. Aweida
- Peter Aweida
- Ameen Estaiteyeh
- Rima Idrissi Garrow
- Essam Ghalayini
- Adnan M. M. Mjalli
- Fuad Sahouri
- Saliba Sarsar, Ph.D.
- Mohammed Shadid
- Ali Zaghab, Ph.D.

== See also ==
- American Palestine Public Affairs Forum
- Hussein Ibish
- Palestine Investment Conference
- Tareq Salahi
- Ziad Asali
