= Jewish Virtual Library =

Online encyclopedia

- Website type: Reference work encyclopedia
- Available in: English
- Owner: American-Israeli Cooperative Enterprise (AICE)
- Website: www.jewishvirtuallibrary.org
- Commercial: No
- Launched: 1997; 29 years ago
- Current status: Online

The Jewish Virtual Library (JVL, formerly known as JSOURCE) is an online encyclopedia published by the non-profit organization American–Israeli Cooperative Enterprise (AICE). Its creator and director is American foreign policy analyst and AICE Executive Director Mitchell Bard. It is a website covering topics about Israel–United States relations, Jewish history, Israel, the Holocaust, antisemitism and Judaism.

The website includes the book Myths and Facts. The book was originally written by Leonard Davis and published in 1964. Later editions were written by Bard who describes it as "the pro-Israel activist's 'bible'".

The JVL also includes the website stopbds.com which aims to combat the Boycott, Divestment and Sanctions movement.

== Overview ==
=== Sources ===
The Jewish Virtual Library relies on history books, scientific studies, various encyclopedias, archives, polls, maps, and material from museums for its bibliography, as well as Wikipedia articles. According to the JVL, it received permission to use materials from the Library of Congress, the American Jewish Historical Society, the Anti-Defamation League, the Simon Wiesenthal Center, the Israeli Ministry of Foreign Affairs and Prime Minister's Office, Rabbi Joseph Telushkin and other resources. Mitchell G. Bard developed and operates the JVL.

=== Sections, topics ===
The Library has 13 sections: Anti-Semitism, History, Myths and Facts, Women, The Holocaust, Travel, Maps, Politics, Biography, Israel, Israel Education, Religion, Judaic Treasures of the Library of Congress, and Vital Statistics and Reference.

The JVL hosts more than 60,000 articles and nearly 10,000 photographs and maps related to Jewish history, Israel, Israel–United States relations, the Holocaust, antisemitism and Judaism, as well as various statistics, information about politics, biographies, travel guides, and a section on Jewish women throughout history. The website includes the complete text of the Tanakh and most of the Babylonian Talmud.

It contains information about Israel education in America, including information about Israel Studies. The website aims to document the relationship between Israel and each of the 50 states, and publish declassified documents from sources such as the CIA, State Department and British Foreign Service that reveal insights into those organizations' attitudes toward Jews and Israel.

== Reception ==
The website has been praised for its accessible interface and balanced information. Librarian John Jaeger, in a 2002 article published by the Association of College and Research Libraries, wrote:

This library, once it is entered, is more like a living encyclopedia than it is anything else. One has options to click on, such as history, women, biography, politics, Israel, maps, and Judaic Treasures at the Library of Congress, with each launching a person into a different realm. The site is extremely well put together.

Also in 2002, Karen Evans of Indiana State University praised the online library for its "easily accessible, balanced information". J. Douglas Smith and Richard Jensen in their book World War II on the Web: A Guide to the Very Best Sites with free CD-ROM published in 2002 also heaped praise on the website:

Part of a comprehensive site devoted to all periods in Jewish history, The Holocaust from the Jewish Virtual Library provides excellent information on the Holocaust. From the library's main page, The Holocaust section leads to an alphabetized list of topics.

The website and its book Myths and Facts have also been criticised for pro-Israel bias. In 1987, Clifford A. Wright, author of Facts and Fables: The Real Story Behind the Arab-Israeli Conflict, dismissed Myths and Facts 1985 (published 1984) in a Spring 1987 Journal of Palestine Studies review entitled Partisan "Facts" as Zionist propaganda:

Simply put, Davis' work is that of a compiler who has gathered virtually every piece of Zionist propaganda produced since the mid-1940s. The reason this book is undocumented is because one cannot document lies. ... The only people who will swallow Davis' myths and facts are the true believers, the naive, or those seeking funds for their electoral campaigns.

American journalist Donald Neff in his Summer 2002 Journal of Palestine Studies review entitled Rewriting History of the 2001 edition was equally critical:

The Arab-Israeli conflict is littered with propaganda masquerading as information. Both sides are active in this black art, where distorting the facts to one side's favor is considered success. In general, Israel and its supporters have been more adept in this poisonous pursuit, mainly because of their wide media access in the United States. The latest edition of Myths and Facts, however, is not one of the better efforts by the pro-Israel side, mainly because it is less adroit than usual at twisting the facts to the benefit of Israel ... . The original Myths and Facts was published as a byproduct of the Near East Report, a pro-Israel newsletter begun in the 1950s by Si Kenen, a tireless propagandist for Israel. Out of Kenen's propaganda work grew the American Israel Public Affairs Committee (AIPAC), today the most powerful Israeli lobby ... . The current version of Myths and Facts is curiously without specific mention of its debt to AIPAC, although it acknowledges the pioneering role of the Near East Report. This is hardly encouraging since the latter is a reliable source of myths but hardly of facts. Author Mitchell G. Bard is a former editor of the Near East Report and a coauthor of the 1992 edition of Myths and Facts. ... Bard is now executive director of yet another pro-Israel group, the American-Israeli Cooperative Enterprise (AICE), founded in 1993. Among its seven board members are Bard, Arthur Bard, and Eli E. Hertz. Hertz left the Israel Defense Forces as a captain after seven years and moved to New York to found a technology company. He is listed as sponsor of the latest Myths and Facts and chairman of the board of AICE.
