= US Campaign for Palestinian Rights =

Palestinian advocacy group

- Formation: 2001; 25 years ago
- Type: 501(c)(3) organization
- Tax ID no.: 42-1636592
- Website: uscpr.org

The US Campaign for Palestinian Rights (USCPR), formerly known as the US Campaign to End Israeli Occupation, is a pro-Palestinian advocacy group advocating for the rights of Palestinians. The organization was founded in 2001 after the second Intifada and is now made up of more than 300 member groups in the US working for Palestinian advocacy. USCPR is registered as a 501(c)(3) organization called Education For Just Peace In The Middle East and was created with the goal to focus on "denied human rights" instead of focusing explicitly on Palestinian statehood.

== Activities ==
USCPR advocates for multiple campaigns, including BDS, providing a "BDS toolkit" and "Divestment toolkit" on its website. It also advocated for prison abolition during COVID-19 and called for a ban of US funding of imprisoning of Palestinian children in the occupied territories.

USCPR has also helped organize pro-Palestinian protests, including a march in DC, in light of the Gaza war. USCPR is seen as among the largest groups supporting the Gaza War protest movement. USCPR has also encouraged student activism for ceasefire, and has supported such student groups.

In September 2018, USCPR invited United States Representative Betty McCollum to an event to thank her for sponsoring a bill, Promoting Human Rights by Ending Israeli Military Detention of Palestinian Children Act. At this event, McCollum became the first representative in the United States to characterize Israel as an apartheid state.

During the Israeli invasion of the Gaza Strip (2023–present), USCPR helped train and support protesters during the 2024 pro-Palestinian protests on university campuses. It has also organized an emailing and call campaign for local representatives that sent nearly 1 million emails, and more than 100,000 calls urging for a ceasefire.

== Membership ==
Notably, USCPR includes both Palestinian-Americans, Jewish-Americans, and other allies working in solidarity with campus groups to create programs highlighting what they consider as Israeli apartheid. For example, USCPR held an event with Jewish Voice for Peace and Georgetown SJP discussing Israeli birthright trips and their context within what they consider Israeli settler-colonialism.

== Reception ==
USCPR is considered one of the foremost pro-Palestinian organizations in the United States. As of 2020, USCPR is one of the organizations blacklisted by Israel, such that its activists are deported from that country.

In 2019, USCPR was sued by Keren Kayemeth LeIsrael-Jewish National Fund and 12 American-Israeli citizens for allegedly providing material support through BDS for terrorist activities during the 2018 Great March of Return. Critics argued the lawsuit was frivolous and designed to combat BDS through "lawfare". The suit was later dismissed, as judges ruled that plaintiffs had failed to provide any sufficient link to terrorism.

In 2023, in light of the October 7 attacks, USCPR annual conference was canceled by Hilton hotels due to alleged safety and security concerns. USCPR said that the cancellation was discriminatory. The event had generated conservative media attention, which called for a pressure campaign to ask Hilton to cancel the event.

== See also ==
- Anti-Occupation Bloc – Israeli political alliance
