= Mitchell Bard =

American foreign policy analyst

- Education: UCLA (PhD) Berkeley (Master's degree) UCSB (B.A.)
- Known for: Executive director of American–Israeli Cooperative Enterprise (AICE), Director of Jewish Virtual Library
- Website: mitchellbard.com

Mitchell Geoffrey Bard is an American foreign policy analyst, editor and author who specializes in U.S.–Middle East policy. He is the Executive Director of the nonprofit American–Israeli Cooperative Enterprise (AICE),, the publisher of the Jewish Virtual Library, of which he also serves as its director.

== Biography ==
Bard received his B.A. in economics from University of California, Santa Barbara, his Master's degree in public policy from University of California, Berkeley, and his Ph.D. in political science from University of California, Los Angeles. His dissertation was on "the limits to domestic influence on U.S. Middle East Policy". He was a postdoctoral fellow at UC Irvine from 1986 to 1987, researching the rescue by Israel of Ethiopian Jews from the Sudan, known as Operation Moses. Bard lives in Maryland with his wife and two sons.

== Media career ==
Bard is a former editor of the Near East Report, AIPAC's weekly newsletter on U.S.-Middle East policy. Before working for the AIPAC, he was a polling analyst for the George H. W. Bush for President Survey Research Group during the 1988 presidential election. He has been interviewed on Fox News, MSNBC, NBC, Al-Jazeera, The Jenny Jones Show and other media outlets.

== Awards and recognition ==
In 2013, he was on the Algemeiner Journal list of the Top 100 People Positively Influencing Jewish Life for his work.

== Published works ==
- Bard, Mitchell (1991). The Water's Edge and Beyond: Defining the Limits to Domestic Influence on United States Middle East Policy. New Brunswick, New Jersey: Transaction. ISBN 0887383467.
- Bard, Mitchell (1991). U.S.-Israel Relations: Looking To The Year 2000. AIPAC.
- Bard, Mitchell (1994). Forgotten Victims: The Abandonment of Americans in Hitler's Camps. Boulder, CO: Westview Press. ISBN 081332193X.
- Bard, Mitchell (2001). The Nuremberg Trials (At Issue in History). Farmington Hills, MI: Greenhaven Press. ISBN 0737710578.
- Bard, Mitchell (2001). The Holocaust (Turning Points in World History). Farmington Hills, MI: Greenhaven Press. ISBN 0737705760.
- Bard, Mitchell (2001). The Complete History of the Holocaust. Farmington Hills, MI: Greenhaven Press. ISBN 0737703733.
- Bard, Mitchell (2002). The Complete Idiot's Guide to Understanding the Brain. New York, NY: Alpha Books. ISBN 0028643100.
- Bard, Mitchell (2002). The Nuremberg Trials (History Firsthand). Farmington Hills, MI: Greenhaven Press. ISBN 0737710756.
- Bard, Mitchell (2002). From Tragedy to Triumph: The Politics behind the Rescue of Ethiopian Jewry. Westport, CT: Greenwood. ISBN 0324180233.
- Bard, Mitchell (2003). The Founding of the State of Israel. Farmington Hills, MI: Greenhaven Press. ISBN 0737713496.
- Bard, Mitchell (2003). 1001 Facts Everyone Should Know About Israel. Jason Aronson. ISBN 0742543587.
- Bard, Mitchell (2008). The Complete Idiot's Guide to Middle East Conflict (Fourth ed.). New York, NY: Alpha Books. ISBN 978-1592577910.
- Bard, Mitchell (2007). Will Israel Survive?. Basingstoke, UK: Palgrave. ISBN 978-1403981981.
- Bard, Mitchell (2008). On One Foot: A Middle East Guide for the Perplexed. Chevy Chase, MD: AICE Inc. ISBN 978-0971294554.
- Bard, Mitchell (2009). Israel Studies: An Anthology. Chevy Chase, MD: Jewish Virtual Library.
- Bard, Mitchell (2010). The Complete Idiot's Guide to World War II (Third ed.). New York, NY: Alpha Books. ISBN 978-1615640249.
- Bard, Mitchell (2010). 48 Hours of Kristallnacht: Night of Destruction/ Dawn of the Holocaust. Lyons Press. ISBN 978-1599219660.
- Bard, Mitchell (2010). The Arab Lobby: The Invisible Alliance That Undermines America's Interests in the Middle East. New York: Broadside Books. ISBN 978-0-061-72601-9.
- Bard, Mitchell (2012). Myths And Facts: A Guide to the Arab-Israeli Conflict. Chevy Chase, MD: AICE Inc. ISBN 978-0971294561.
- Bard, Mitchell (2012). Israel Matters: Understand the Past - Look to the Future. Springfield, NJ: Behrman House.
- Bard, Mitchell (2013). After Anatevka - Tevye Goes to Palestine. CreateSpace. ISBN 978-1481907132.
- Bard, Mitchell (2014). Death to the Infidels: Radical Islam's War Against the Jews. Basingstoke, UK: Palgrave. ISBN 978-1137279071.
