= American Palestine Public Affairs Forum =

Non-profit 501 (c) (3) organisation

The logo of the APPAF

The American Palestine Public Affairs Forum (APPAF) is a non-profit 501(c)(3) organization that attempts to promote the interests of Palestinians in the United States. The organization promotes non-violence, democracy in the Middle East, and a two-state solution to the Israeli–Palestinian conflict. APPAF strives to improve relations between Palestinian and non-Palestinian peoples in America, and mobilize public support for their goals.

According to their website the organization hopes to pressure U.S. political leaders to enforce UN Security Council Resolutions relating to the establishment of an independent Palestinian State in the West Bank and the Gaza Strip.

The chair of the APPAF was Dr. Zahi H. Masri (1935-2023).
