= Paul Findley =

American politician and writer (1921–2019)

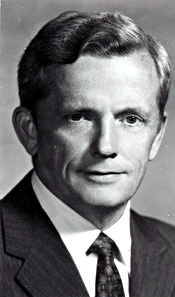

Member of the U.S. House of Representatives from Illinois's 20th district
- In office January 3, 1961 – January 3, 1983
- Preceded by: Edna O. Simpson
- Succeeded by: Dick Durbin

Personal details
- Born: Paul Augustus Findley; June 23, 1921 Jacksonville, Illinois, U.S.
- Died: August 9, 2019 (aged 98) Jacksonville, Illinois, U.S.
- Party: Republican
- Spouse: Lucille Gemme (m. 1946; died 2011)
- Children: 2, including Craig (son)
- Education: Illinois College (BA)

Military service
- Branch/service: United States Navy
- Rank: Lieutenant
- Battles/wars: World War II

Paul Augustus Findley (June 23, 1921 – August 9, 2019) was an American writer and politician. He served as United States Representative from Illinois, representing its 20th District. A Republican, he was first elected in 1960. A moderate Republican for most of his long political career, Findley was a supporter of civil rights and an early opponent of the U.S. war in Vietnam. He co-authored the War Powers Act in 1973, which aims to limit the ability of the president to go to war without congressional authorization. Findley lost his seat in 1982 to current United States Senator Dick Durbin. He was a cofounder of the Council for the National Interest, a Washington, D.C. advocacy group, and was a vocal critic of American policy towards Israel.

== Early life ==
Findley was born in Jacksonville, Illinois, the son of Florence Mary (Nichols) and Joseph S. Findley. He attended the Jacksonville public schools. He received his bachelor's degree from Illinois College, which is currently home to The Paul Findley Congressional Office Museum. The collection contains manuscripts and artifacts related to the life and political career of Paul Findley. It is one of the few congressional office museums in the United States. Findley served in the United States Navy during World War II and was commissioned a lieutenant (junior grade).

== Career ==
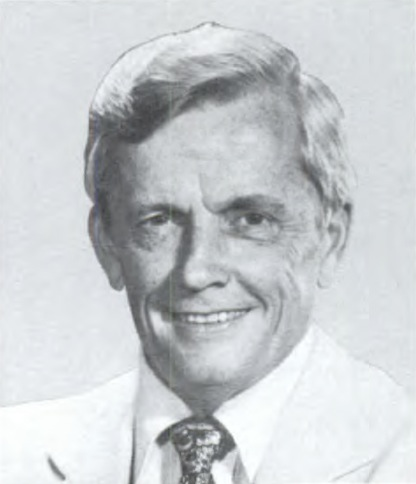
A portrait of Findley in 1979

Findley served 11 terms in Congress, finally losing to Dick Durbin, in his bid for reelection in 1982. He was known in Congress as an advocate for the farmers of his district, as an early opponent of the U.S. war in Vietnam, and as a strong proponent of the Palestinians and of opening up communication with the Palestine Liberation Organization since they were the strongest and most organized representatives of Palestinian people at the time.

Findley famously helped Springfield teenager Frank Mitchell get appointed as the first African-American page in the U.S. House of Representatives since Reconstruction in 1965 after consulting with then-House GOP leader Gerald Ford to get more African-American people involved in the Republican Party. Ford used one of his page appointments to name Mitchell. At the time of Mitchell's death, Findley's son Craig stated that Mitchell and the Congressman had remained friends until Findley's death in 2019 and that the appointment was one of his proudest accomplishments.

An early critic of U.S. military involvement in South East Asia, Findley and his staff pioneered what became a signature tactic of the peace movement: in 1969 Rep. Findley got the Congressional Record to publish the names of all Americans who had died in the Vietnam War, which then numbered over 31,000. Soon after, Quaker peace groups and other anti-war activists began reading those names aloud on the steps of the U.S. Capitol and at protests and vigils across the country.

Findley also co-authored the War Powers Act of 1973 which was passed by the House and Senate over President Nixon's veto. The measure was intended to prevent a president from committing the United States to war without the consent of Congress.

According to The New York Times, in 1982 Findley narrowly lost his bid for re-election for a number of reasons: "a competent opponent, redistricting, the economic recession, and pro-Israel groups support to his challenger," which allowed Findley's challenger to match him in spending. During the campaign, "a former AIPAC [American Israel Public Affairs Committee] president called him 'a dangerous enemy of Israel.'" Findley confirmed that his 1982 campaign raised "almost exactly the same sum" as that of his opponent. Following his defeat, he served on the Board for International Food and Agricultural Development (BIFAD) from 1983 to 1994.

In 1989, Findley, with former representative Pete McCloskey (R-CA), formed the Council for the National Interest. It is a 501(c)4 non-profit, non-partisan organization in the United States that works for "Middle East policies that serve the American national interest." Its first executive director was ten-term congressman John B. Anderson (R-IL), who ran as an independent candidate in the 1980 U.S. presidential election.

== Criticism of Israel ==
A year after the September 11 attacks in 2001, Findley published an article saying that this attack would never have occurred were it not for the United States' uncritical support of Israel. Findley claimed that the 2003 invasion of Iraq was launched primarily to benefit Israel, at the behest of the Israel lobby in the United States.

Findley was a frequent critic of U.S. foreign policy regarding Israel. Findley was the author of They Dare to Speak Out: People and Institutions Confront Israel's Lobby in which he stated that the pro-Israel lobby, notably AIPAC, has undue influence over Congress. He referred to the lobby as "the 700-pound gorilla in Washington".

A review of the book in The Washington Post stated: "Stripped of all the maudlin martyrdom, former congressman Paul Findley's message is straightforward and valid: Israeli influence in the United States, including in the inner sanctums of government, is very strong." The New York Times review by Adam Clymer described the book as "an angry, one-sided book that seems often to be little more than a stringing together of stray incidents ... [it] does not really accept the idea that people of any political point of view are entitled to organize, support their friends and try to defeat the people they think are their enemies". The review describes the book as "the typical reaction of a Congressman who is offended at being challenged seriously for his seat, especially if the upstart should go so far as to beat him."

Findley listed the Israeli lobby as one of the factors contributing to his defeat in 1982, alongside the national recession of 1982 and the change of his district's boundaries after the 1980 census. "In seeking gains for Israel, they rigorously stifled dissent and intimidated the entire Congress. They still do. They defeat legislators who criticize Israel. Senators Adlai Stevenson III and Charles H. Percy, and Representatives Pete McCloskey, Cynthia McKinney, Earl F. Hilliard, and myself were defeated at the polls by candidates heavily financed by pro-Israel forces. McKinney alone was able to regain her seat in Congress."

In 1991, on the 24th anniversary of the 1967 USS Liberty incident, he and fellow former Congressman Pete McCloskey set up a meeting at the White House that was attended by approximately 50 Liberty survivors. He has also authored several articles in support of Liberty survivors.

On the publication of John Mearsheimer and Stephen Walt's 2006 paper, "The Israel Lobby", which was later expanded into the book The Israel Lobby and U.S. Foreign Policy, he wrote: "You can't imagine how pleased I was [...] I think I can pose as a foremost expert on the lobby for Israel, because I was the target the last three years I was in Congress."

Findley supported the efforts of the Council on American–Islamic Relations (CAIR) to improve the image of Muslims in America. In a conference in Riyadh, Saudi Arabia, Findley said that "the cancer of anti-Muslim and anti-Islamic sentiments was spreading in American society and requires corrective measures to stamp out this malaise." In May 2006 Findley led a CAIR delegation to the United Arab Emirates (UAE), resulting in a UAE proposal to build a property in the United States to serve as an endowment for CAIR. This proposal amounted to tens of millions of dollars in UAE donations. He was a board member of If Americans Knew and the Streit Council.

Findley endorsed the proposal for the United Nations Parliamentary Assembly (UNPA), one of only six persons who served in the United States Congress ever to do so.

=== Reactions ===
The Anti-Defamation League (ADL) has criticized the Council for the National Interest (CNI), of which Findley was a founder, as an "anti-Israel organization" that "disseminates demonizing propaganda about Israel to academics, politicians, and other audiences." The ADL alleges that the CNI has disseminated cartoons with anti-Semitic based themes by Khalil Bendib. Additionally, it expressed concern about a 2003 article by Findley blamed U.S. support of Israel for the September 11 attacks: "Nine-eleven would not have occurred if the U.S. government had refused to help Israel humiliate and destroy Palestinian society." Findley continued in the same article that: "America suffered 9/11 and its aftermath and may soon be at war with Iraq, mainly because U.S. policy in the Middle East is made in Israel, not in Washington."

== Death ==
Findley died from heart failure on August 9, 2019, at Passavant Area Hospital in Jacksonville, Illinois, at the age of 98. He was buried in Arlington National Cemetery in June 2022.

His son Craig J. Findley served in the Illinois General Assembly.

== Published works ==
- The Transparent Cabal: The Neoconservative Agenda, War in the Middle East, and the National Interest of Israel (Foreword). 2008. Ihs Press. ISBN 978-1-932528-17-6
- Silent No More: Confronting America's False Images of Islam. 2001. Amana Publications. ISBN 1-59008-001-7
- They Dare to Speak Out: People and Institutions Confront Israel's Lobby. 1985, 1989, 2003 editions. Lawrence Hill Books. ISBN 1-55652-482-X
- Deliberate Deceptions: Facing the Facts About the U.S.–Israeli Relationship. 1993, 1995 editions. Lawrence Hill Books. ISBN 1-55652-239-8
- Abraham Lincoln: The Crucible of Congress. 1979, 2004 editions. Crown. ISBN 978-1-885852-41-0
- The Federal Farm Fable. 1968. Arlington House. ASIN B001UCDQQW
- Speaking Out: A Congressman's Lifelong Fight Against Bigotry, Famine, and War.2011. Chicago Review Press. ISBN 1569766258

U.S. House of Representatives
Preceded by Edna O. Simpson	Member of the U.S. House of Representatives from Illinois's 20th congressional district 1961–1983	Succeeded by Dick Durbin
