= New Profile =

Israeli antimilitarist and feminist organisation

- פרופיל חדש
- Formation: October 30, 1998 (registered 1999)
- Founder: Rela Mazali and others
- Headquarters: Tel Aviv-Yafo, Israel
- Members: 11 (2024)
- Budget: ₪ 617,650 ILS
- Staff: 8 FTEs (2024)
- Volunteers: 26 (2024)
- Website: New Profile Official Website

New Profile - The Movement to Demilitarize Israeli Society (פרופיל חדש - התנועה לאזרוח החברה בישראל) is an Israeli feminist and antimilitarist movement aimed at transforming Israeli society into a "civilian" one (חברה אזרחית). The organization advocates for the demilitarization of Israeli society, campaigns against the compulsory law of military enlistment, and provides support for conscientious objectors and others seeking exemption from service in the Israel Defense Forces (IDF).

New Profile is an associated organization of War Resisters' International (WRI). It was established in 1998, primarily by women activists, including Rela Mazali.

== History and organization ==
New Profile grew out of two study groups of Israeli women formed in 1996 to explore the status of women in a highly militarized society. Following two years of joint study, the group members organized a public conference focusing on military enlistment and draft refusal in Israel. New Profile was officially established at this conference on October 30, 1998, and was formally registered as a non-profit organization in Israel in 1999.

The movement's ideology is reflected in its non-hierarchical organizational structure. It operates without an executive director, relying instead on consensus-based decision-making. Organizational matters and strategic decisions are discussed and voted upon during monthly assemblies, which are open to active community members.

== Core activities ==
New Profile operates primarily through two main projects:

- The Counseling Network: A support network for individuals who independently choose to avoid or discontinue their military service. Coordinated by a network coordinator, a legal coordinator, and trained volunteers, the network assists approximately 1,600 people annually. It provides free counseling, legal aid, and moral support through the exemption process, including navigating medical or mental health exemptions (Profile 21), religious exemptions, and dealing with imprisonment for refusing the draft or going AWOL.
- Education and Outreach: Programs aimed at raising awareness among Israelis—particularly youth, educators, and social workers—about militarism and its societal impacts. The organization hosts workshops, conferences, and lectures, and distributes research-based publications to legitimize the choice not to enlist and to offer civil alternatives for exempted individuals. It also publishes research reports on the effects of militarization on Israeli society, as well as publications on the effects of military service on soldiers and conscientious objectors. Over the years, the movement has distributed informational booklets on various topics, including options and procedures for exemption from military service, a guide for conscientious objectors in military prisons, and civilian alternatives for those granted exemptions.

== Objectives ==
The official stated goals and objectives of New Profile include:

- Reducing militarism in Israeli society and preventing militarism in education.
- Resisting the Israeli occupation of the Palestinian territories.
- Reducing the social stigma associated with profile 21 and military exemption.
- Canceling the law of compulsory conscription to the Israeli military.
- Creating a lobby for legislation that recognizes the fundamental right to refuse to serve in the military or the occupied territories for reasons of conscience.
- Supporting refuseniks and individuals imprisoned for their refusal to enlist.
- Promoting the recognition of civil and alternative service options for men and women.
- Offering an alternative civilian discourse centered on feminism, equality, tolerance, and peace.

== Legal proceedings and criminal investigation ==
In September 2008, Israeli Attorney General Menachem Mazuz ordered the police to open a criminal investigation against New Profile based on allegations of "incitement to draft dodging" and helping people secure exemptions fraudulently.

On April 26, 2009, eight New Profile activists were detained for questioning and the organization's computers were confiscated by the police.

== See also ==
- Coalition of Women for a Just Peace
- Refusal to serve in the IDF
- Sarvanim
- Profile 21
- Mesarvot
