= Adel Amer =

Arab-Israeli politician (born 1962)

- عادل عامر
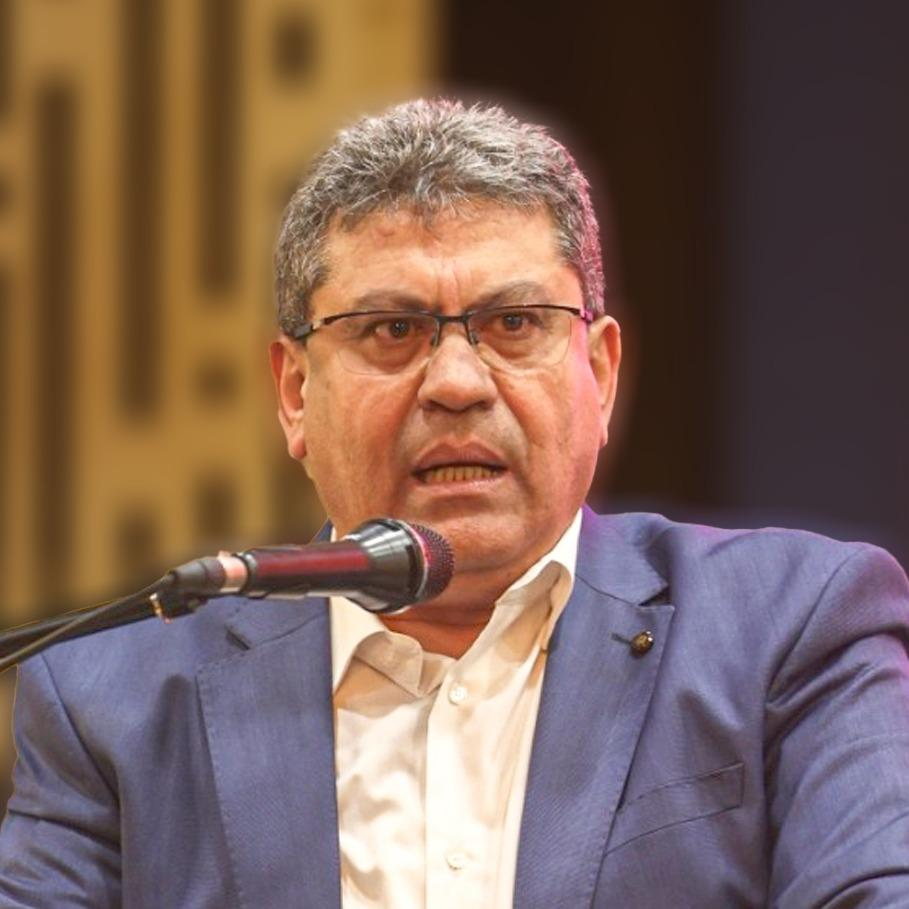

Secretary-General of the Communist Party of Israel (Maki)
- Incumbent
- Assumed office June 28, 2015
- Preceded by: Mohamed Nafa

Personal details
- Born: 1962 (age 63–64) Kafr Qasim, Israel
- Party: Communist Party of Israel
- Other political affiliations: Hadash; Young Communist League of Israel
- Education: Moscow University (BA)
- Occupation: Politician, educator, journalist

Adel Amer (Arabic: عادل عامر, Hebrew: עאדל עאמר; born 1962) is an Arab-Israeli politician, educator, and journalist currently serving as the Secretary-General of the Communist Party of Israel. He was first elected to the position in June 2015, succeeding Mohamed Nafa, and is the first Secretary-General to hail from the southern Triangle area.

== Early life and education ==
Amer was born in 1962 in the city of Kafr Qasim. In 1979, he joined the Young Communist League of Israel (known as Banki-Shabiba). According to Amer, a major turning point in his political politicization occurred three years prior, when he attended the Communist Party's 1976 mass public gathering commemorating the 20th anniversary of the Kafr Qasim massacre, an event that proved to him that "Palestinians in Israel have partners and leaders for their struggle."

He pursued higher education in the Soviet Union, earning a bachelor's degree in communication from Moscow University. During his time studying in the USSR, he served as the secretary of Maki's Moscow branch for members living in Russia.

Following his education, Amer worked professionally as an educator, developing curricula and facilitating groups on education for democracy. In 2013, he was part of the development and implementation team for the Israeli Ministry of Education's program "Bishvil HaDialog" (For Dialogue), which focused on the educational coping with racism. He also pursued a career in journalism, eventually becoming a member of the editorial board for Al-Ittihad, the Communist Party of Israel's daily Arabic-language newspaper.

== Political career ==
Amer rose through the ranks of the Communist Party of Israel over several decades, serving as a member of the Central Committee , Politburo and as the party secretary for the Triangle District, a major geographical hub of Arab-Israeli political activity.

On June 28, 2015, the Central Committee of the Communist Party of Israel elected Amer as the new Secretary-General, following the retirement of outgoing General Secretary Mohamed Nafa, who had served since 2002. He was unanimously re-elected to the position during the 28th Congress of Maki in October 2021 in Nazareth.

During the 29th Congress in Shefa-Amr in February 2026, Amer spoke out against political persecution of the party, citing police raids on party branches in Nazareth and Haifa and the prevention of Hadash national council meetings. He reaffirmed the party's role as a shared political home for Arab and Jewish activists working for social justice.

As Secretary-General, Amer frequently comments on public affairs in both Arabic and Hebrew-language media, including appearances on Israeli public broadcasting programs such as Makan 33. He has also represented Maki internationally, participating in global communist forums such as the international peace conference convened by the French Communist Party in Paris.

== Political positions ==
=== Domestic policy and civil rights ===
Amer has been heavily involved in organizing for workers' rights. During May Day in 2017, Amer joined Hadash MKs and Histadrut faction members in distributing red flowers and Arabic-language informational flyers detailing workers' rights and construction safety to Palestinian laborers crossing military checkpoints.

Amer became a vocal critic of the judicial reform pushed by the right-wing government and Justice Minister Yariv Levin. In early 2023, Amer publicly called on citizens to join mass protests in Tel Aviv, arguing that the government was attempting to "shrink what is left of the democratic space," pointing to parallel legislative efforts aimed at banning the Palestinian flag and retroactively legalizing Israeli outposts in the West Bank.

=== Jewish-Arab partnerships and the Zionist Left ===
Within the internal debates of the Communist Party regarding alliances with the Zionist left, Amer has outlined a nuanced approach that distinguishes between the roles of the party's different organs. He views Maki as a strict ideological party, while maintaining that Hadash should operate as a broader political front open to partnerships with outside groups, including Zionist forces.

Amer has stated that the door is not closed to cooperating with Zionist peace and protest movements, citing historical alliances with the Black Panthers in the 1970s and 1980s, as well as joint participation in modern mass protests, such as the June 5 demonstrations marking the anniversary of the Six-Day War and the protests against the judicial reform.

However, he has drawn strict political lines regarding certain contemporary left-wing groups. He strongly rejected the possibility of political partnership with the left-wing Zionist party Meretz after it joined the Israeli governing coalition, accusing the party of maintaining its Zionism while abandoning its leftist principles and losing its "last fig leaf." Amer has also expressed reservations regarding the Arab-Jewish movement Standing Together. While acknowledging occasional cooperation between the groups, he argued that there is no need for a separate peace movement that competes for the exact same target audiences and political circles that Maki has traditionally organized.

=== Israeli-Palestinian conflict and Gaza War ===
Amer advocates for a two-state solution based on the November 1947 UN partition plan and the 1967 borders, which includes the establishment of an independent Palestinian state alongside Israel and realizes the Palestinian right to self-determination.

Amer has been heavily critical of Israel's military actions during the Gaza war, characterizing the conflict in Gaza as a "brutal war of annihilation." He has warned against right-wing Israeli proposals to annex territories or expel the Palestinian population. To counter this, Amer heavily promoted the "Peace Partnership," a Jewish-Arab coalition demanding an end to the war, a hostage and prisoner exchange deal, and equal civil rights for Arab citizens of Israel.

In alignment with his anti-war stance, Amer openly supports Israeli conscientious objectors (refuseniks). In March 2025, Amer and Hadash MK Ofer Cassif accompanied an 18-year-old Communist Youth activist to the Tel HaShomer military induction center as she was imprisoned for refusing to enlist in the IDF in protest of the war in Gaza.

=== Foreign policy ===
Amer's views align heavily with the anti-imperialist framework of the international communist movement, particularly regarding his opposition to United States policy in the Middle East.

In May 2017, during US President Donald Trump's visit to Israel, Amer and other prominent Hadash activists demonstrated outside the US Embassy in Tel Aviv. Amer accused the United States of being "part of the problem, not the solution," arguing that its policy directly supported the Israeli far-right and deepened the occupation.

This opposition extended to the Trump peace plan released in early 2020. Amer fiercely opposed the plan's controversial proposal to potentially transfer Arab-Israeli cities in the Triangle area—including his hometown of Kafr Qasim—to the jurisdiction of a future Palestinian state. Warning against treating the proposal as a joke, he urged citizens to take the threat of the transfer plan seriously. This opposition directly influenced his domestic electoral strategy; while Amer had strongly pushed for the party to recommend Blue and White leader Benny Gantz for Prime Minister following the September 2019 elections, Gantz's subsequent embrace of the Trump plan led Amer to firmly oppose recommending him for future mandates.

=== Condemnation of terror attacks ===
In March 2022, following a series of deadly Islamic State (ISIS) terror attacks in Be'er Sheva, Hadera, and Bnei Brak, Amer issued a strong condemnation on behalf of the party. He stated that ISIS ideology criminally harms Arab peoples and completely contradicts the Palestinian public's struggle. Amer warned against right-wing factions utilizing the attacks to incite racism against Arab citizens or to delegitimize their demands for civil equality, urging instead for the deepening of the joint Arab-Jewish struggle.

=== Support for Palestinian prisoners ===
Amer is a vocal advocate for the rights of Palestinian prisoners and has actively campaigned against the use of administrative detention by Israeli authorities. As part of this advocacy, Amer and other Hadash leaders have expressed solidarity with Palestinian prisoners, framing their imprisonment within the broader context of the Palestinian national struggle. This has included meetings and joint appearances at political rallies with Khader Adnan, a prominent Palestinian prisoner and senior figure in Palestinian Islamic Jihad who became a symbol of the hunger strike movement before dying in an Israeli prison. Similarly, in January 2023, Amer led a joint delegation to welcome the release of Karim Younis, an Arab-Israeli citizen who had just completed a 40-year sentence for the 1980 murder of an IDF soldier, presenting him with a plaque of appreciation for his steadfastness. While these actions have drawn severe criticism from right-wing Israeli media outlets like Makor Rishon and Arutz Sheva due to the individuals' militant affiliations and criminal convictions, Amer and his party frame this solidarity as a principled defense of human rights and a protest against systemic political persecution.

== See also ==
- Hadash
- Al-Ittihad (Israeli newspaper)
