= Anti-Occupation Bloc =

Israeli political alliance

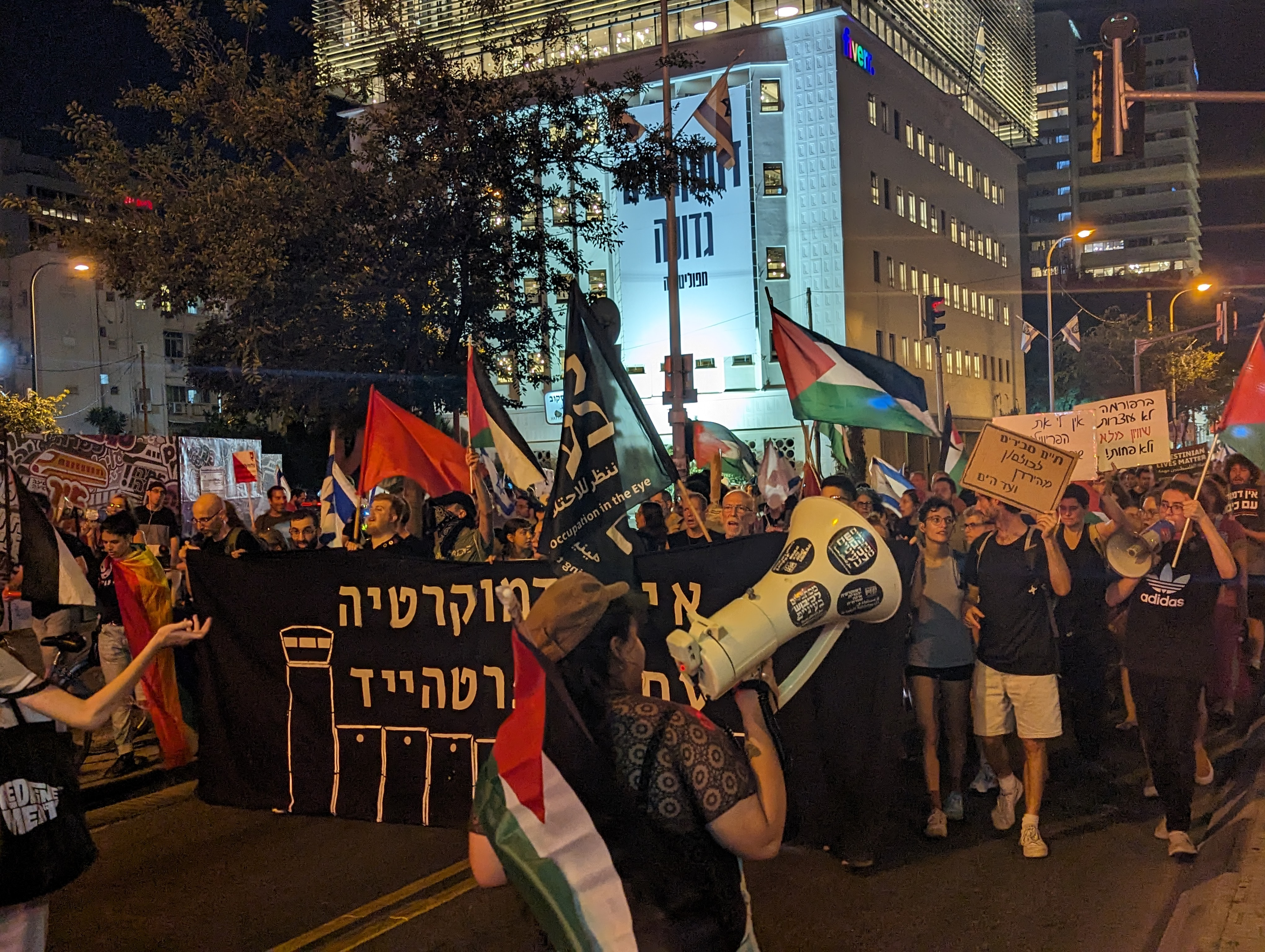
Anti-Occupation Bloc at 2023 Israeli judicial reform protests, 18th July 2023

The Anti-Occupation Bloc (in Hebrew: הגוש נגד הכיבוש, in Arabic: الكتلة ضد الاحتلال) is an Israeli alliance of Jewish and Palestinian political movements, activists and organizations advocating against Israeli occupation policies. The bloc was formed during the 2020–2021 protests against Benjamin Netanyahu, which argued that rather than simply removing Netanyahu from power, Israeli policies must also be examined and amended.

The bloc protested at the Sheikh Jarrah demonstrations, 2020–2021 protests against Benjamin Netanyahu, and 2023 Israeli judicial reform protests, and as of 2025 is participating in the Israeli hostage deal protests.

On their website, the bloc has written: "We are working together to emphasize the connection between the occupation and the regime coup [referring to the 2023 Israeli judicial reform]. We are thousands of protesters in over 20 cities across the country".

== Involved groups ==
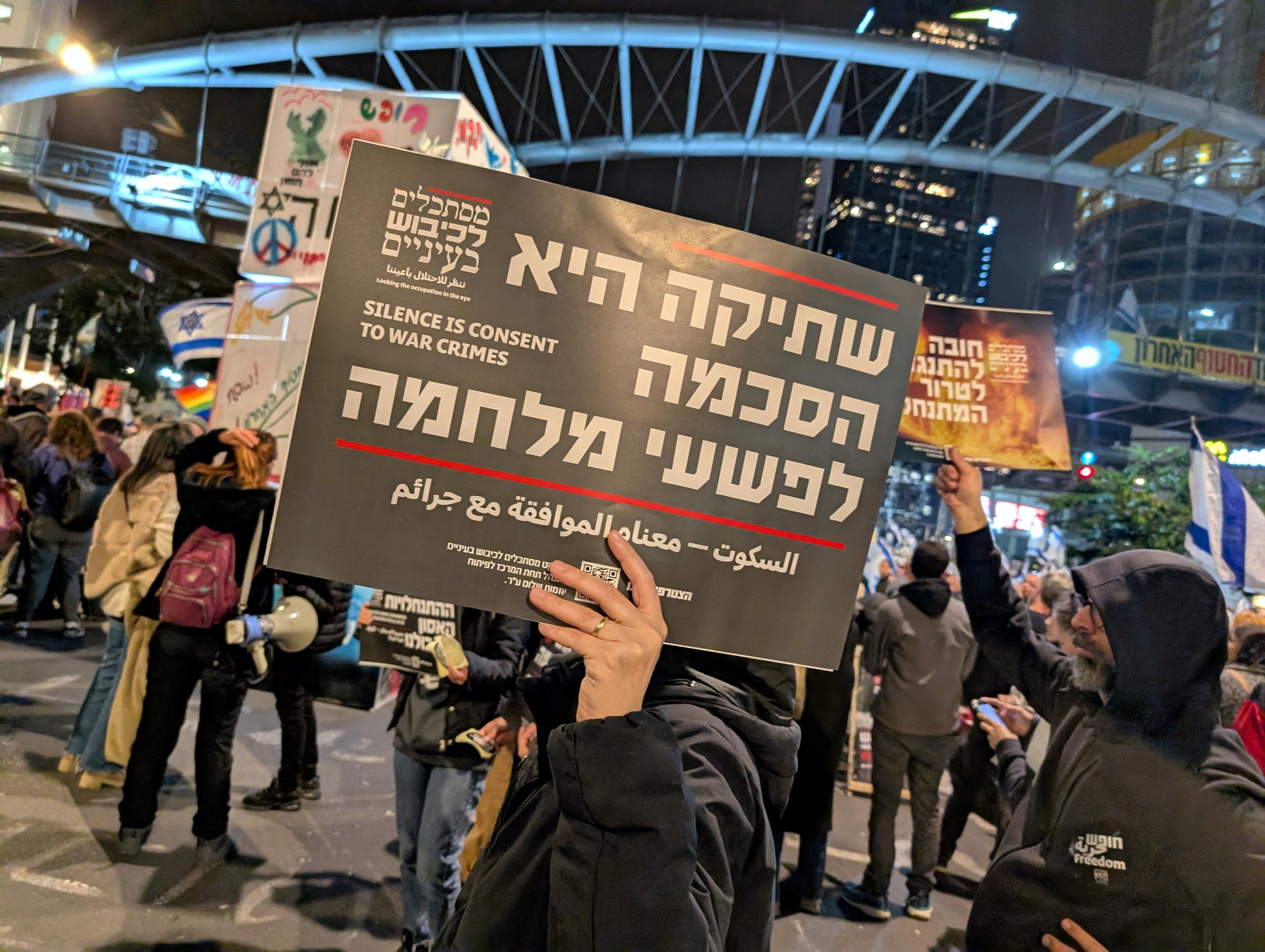
Anti-Occupation Bloc protester holds a sign that says "Silence is consent to war crimes", at Israeli hostage deal protests in Tel Aviv

The bloc consists of mainly left and far-left movements and organizations, that felt the need to unite in view of the weakening of the Israeli left.

Organizations	Type
Peace Now, Looking The Occupation In The Eye, Breaking the Silence, Combatants for Peace, Free Jerusalem, A Land for All, Parents Against Child Detention, PsychoActive, Machsom Watch, Academia for Equality, Women in Black, Moms Against Violence, Yesh Din, Yesh Gvul, Ir Amim, PHR-IL, Gisha	NGO
Hadash, Israeli Communist Party	Political party
Standing Together, Radical Bloc	Political organisation
Democratic women's movement in Israel	Social movement
Young Communist League of Israel	Youth movement
Mesarvot	Social group

== History ==
The bloc formed at 2020–2021 protests against Benjamin Netanyahu.

On 14 October 2020, the bloc wrote "דמוקרטיה או כיבוש" ("Democracy or Occupation") in Rabin Square, where the assassination of Yitzhak Rabin occurred.

On 1 July 2023, a Brothers in Arms activist attacked an Anti-Occupation Bloc protestor with pepper spray, causing outrage.

On 23 July 2023, members of the bloc hung a sign saying "We will not die and we will not kill in the service of the settlements" in front of General Staff Israel Defense Forces Headquarters in Tel Aviv-Yafo.

On 16 January 2024, clashes occurred between Israeli Police and the Anti-Occupation Bloc. the police said later that day: "There is no tolerance for those who support the enemy".

Since 2024, three youth members of Mesarvot and Anti-Occupation Bloc have been sent to prison for refusal to serve in the Israel Defense Forces.
