= Itamar Greenberg =

Israeli conscientious objector

- איתמר גרינברג
- Born: 2006 (age 19–20)
- Organization: Mesarvot
- Known for: Refusing service in the Israel Defense Forces

Itamar Greenberg (Hebrew: איתמר גרינברג; born 2006) is an Israeli anti-war activist. Greenberg received international attention for his refusal to serve in the Israel Defense Forces, declining to seek an exemption and ultimately serving 197 days in prison, one of the longest sentences for a conscientious objector.

== Biography ==
=== Early life and family ===
Greenberg was born into a large Haredi family in Bnei Brak in 2006. His father, Avi, an IDF reservist, began recruiting young people from ultra-Orthodox communities in Israel, people who historically have not served in the IDF, after the October 7 attacks. His mother, Ela, voiced support for his activism and called him a moral role model. During his youth, he studied at a yeshiva.

=== Military objection and imprisonment ===
Like most young Israeli citizens, Greenberg was subject to mandatory military service. On August 5, 2024, at 18, he declined to serve on conscientious grounds, saying that he did not want to take part in what he described as genocide in Palestine. As a result, he was sentenced to prison on multiple occasions, given the opportunity to report for the draft after each release.

Over five prison sentences between August 2024 and April 2025, Greenberg served a total of 197 days at Neve Tzedek Prison, the longest sentence of any conscientious objector in twenty years. Previously, Tair Kaminer served a total of 150 days for her refusal to serve in the IDF in 2016. He declined to seek a medical or psychiatric exemption from military service, which would have allowed him to avoid prison and social stigma. He said that by seeking an exemption, he would have been hiding his reasons for refusing to serve. He was ultimately involuntarily granted an exemption due to "a history of poor behavior", an exemption the courts have given conscientious objectors who have continuously refused to enlist.

Greenberg said that he did not get along with other inmates, telling The New York Times that the majority of his cellmates were IDF soldiers charged with crimes who collectively threatened him for his anti-war activism. For his own protection, there were times when he was moved into solitary confinement.

=== Post-release activities ===
Greenberg was arrested by police near the Azrieli Center in Tel Aviv during an anti-war demonstration on 24 May 2025, on grounds that the demonstration was part of an illegal gathering. He was held overnight at the Glilot police station, during which Greenberg alleged prison staff forced him to remove his shirt, which read "No to war, yes to peace" in both Hebrew and Arabic, and wear a sweatshirt on which a guard had used a marker to draw the Flag of Israel and write the Hebrew phrase Am Yisrael Chai. He also alleged they took pictures of him in the sweater and threatened to carve a Star of David into his face if he were arrested again. A magistrate court judge declined the police department's request to hold Greenberg for longer and banned him from protests for 30 days.

== Anti-Iran war protests and High Court petition ==
In early 2026, Greenberg participated in demonstrations against the war with Iran and was arrested. In an opinion piece published in Haaretz, Greenberg wrote that during his arrest for protesting the war, Israeli police beat and strip-searched him. An Israeli court subsequently ruled that the police strip search was illegal.

Following police restrictions on the anti-war protests, Greenberg and the Association for Civil Rights in Israel filed a petition to the High Court of Justice. They challenged the police's handling of public demonstrations during wartime, sparking a broader legal clash over who sets the terms for protests and whether restrictions were being applied equally.

In April 2026, High Court President Isaac Amit and Justices Khaled Kabub and Yechiel Kasher issued a conditional order regarding the petition. The court required the state to explain why it had not established a protest policy that properly balances emergency security needs with the constitutional rights to free expression and protest. Alongside the order, the court's president directed the police to allow the anti-Iran war demonstrations to proceed.

== See also ==
- Conscription in Israel
- Yesh Gvul
- Refusenik
