= Mohamed Nafa =

Israeli Druze politician and writer (1939–2021)

- محمد نفاع
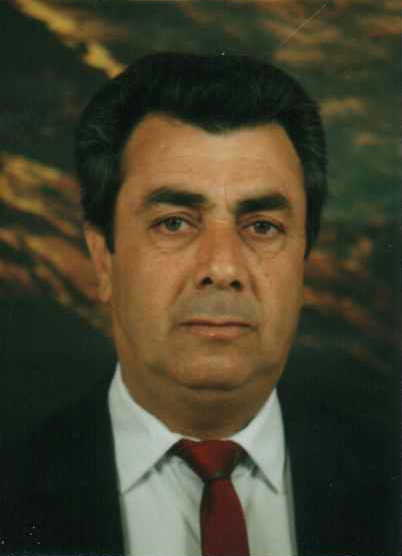

Faction represented in the Knesset
- 1990–1992: Hadash

Secretary-General of Maki
- In office 1993–2002
- Preceded by: Tawfik Toubi
- Succeeded by: Issam Makhoul
- In office 2007–2015
- Preceded by: Issam Makhoul
- Succeeded by: Adel Amer

Personal details
- Born: 15 May 1939 Beit Jann, Mandatory Palestine
- Died: 15 July 2021 (aged 82)
- Party: Maki
- Other political affiliations: Hadash
- Education: Hebrew University of Jerusalem
- Occupation: Politician, writer

Mohamed Nafa (Arabic: محمد نفاع; Hebrew: מוחמד נפאע; 15 May 1939 – 15 July 2021) was an Israeli Druze politician and writer. He served as a member of the Knesset for Hadash (1990–1992) and later served two non-consecutive terms as secretary-general of the Communist Party of Israel.

== Biography ==
=== Early life and education ===
Nafa was born in Beit Jann in the Galilee during the British Mandate period. He attended high school in Rameh and later studied Hebrew and Arabic literature at the Hebrew University of Jerusalem.

=== Political activity ===
Nafa joined the communist movement in the 1960s, becoming active in the Young Communist League of Israel, later becoming the Secretary General of the youth organization. He was an early opponent of compulsory military service for Druze citizens, a position that he continued to associate with his broader anti-war and anti-occupation politics.

He ran on the Hadash list in the 1988 Knesset elections but did not win a seat. He entered the Knesset on 14 February 1990 as a replacement for Tawfiq Ziad and served until the end of the Twelfth Knesset in 1992.

=== Secretary-general of Maki ===
Nafa later served as secretary-general of the Communist Party of Israel (Maki). According to a CPI report on the party’s 26th congress and subsequent Central Committee session, he was first elected secretary-general in 1993 and completed that term in 2002; he was re-elected to the post in 2007 and was again re-elected by the party leadership in 2012. Adel Amer succeeded him as party general secretary in 2015.

The years immediately preceding Nafa’s first election to the post were associated with the tenure of veteran communist politician Tawfik Toubi, who served as secretary-general of the party in the early 1990s.

== Political views ==
In interviews and public statements, Nafa associated Maki’s politics with opposition to occupation and support for a negotiated settlement. In a 2009 interview published by People’s World, he described the party as advocating a two-state settlement based on Israel’s withdrawal to the pre-1967 lines, with East Jerusalem as the capital of a Palestinian state, and called for dismantling settlements in the occupied territories and addressing Palestinian refugees “in accordance with UN resolutions”.

A profile in the Hebrew weekly Makor Rishon described Nafa as opposing Druze conscription and supporting the idea of Israel as a “state of all its citizens”. In 2014, a greeting message to the CPUSA was published under his name as “Secretary General”, reiterating CPI positions including opposition to occupation and support for an independent Palestinian state alongside Israel on the 1967 lines.

== Literary career and works ==
Alongside his political activity, Nafa was active as a writer and is frequently described as a notable Palestinian short-story author. A 2024 announcement about the Hebrew publication of his collection Qushan (קושאן) described him as primarily known for short fiction, with stories often appearing in communist-affiliated Arabic outlets including Al-Ittihad and the literary magazine Al-Jadid.

An introductory chapter for Qushan notes that Nafa’s first short-story collection appeared in 1976 and that he later published additional collections; it also states that his stories have been translated into multiple languages, including English, French, Russian, Spanish and German. The same material characterizes his fiction as centered on village life, the relationship between people and land, and everyday endurance under political and social pressure.

=== Selected works ===
- Qushan (קושאן), Hebrew edition in the Maktoob series (collection of five short stories; published 2024).

== Death ==
Nafa died on 15 July 2021 at the age of 82. Obituaries and memorial pieces in communist-affiliated outlets described him as a former secretary-general of the party and emphasized his combination of political organizing and literary activity.

== Archival material ==
The Palestinian Museum Digital Archive includes a 2006 letter addressed to Nafa regarding Knesset election mobilization and publication of a notice in Al-Ittihad, reflecting his continued role in party and front political work after his parliamentary term.
