= Uri Davis =

Israeli activist (born 1943)

Uriel "Uri" Davis
- אוריאל "אורי" דייוויס

Vice-Chairman of the Israeli League for Human and Civil Rights

Lecturer in Peace Studies at the University of Bradford

Member of Fatah's Revolutionary Council
- Incumbent
- Assumed office 2009

Personal details
- Born: June 8, 1943 (age 83) Jerusalem, Mandatory Palestine
- Party: Fatah
- Spouse: Miyassar Abu Ali
- Education: Hebrew University of Jerusalem, The New School for Social Research
- Occupation: Academic, civil rights activist

Interview with Uri Davis

Uriel "Uri" Davis (Hebrew: אוריאל "אורי" דייוויס, Arabic: أوري ديفيس; born 8 June 1943) is an academic and civil rights activist. Davis has served as Vice-Chairman of the Israeli League for Human and Civil Rights and as lecturer in Peace Studies at the University of Bradford. Davis describes himself as "a Palestinian Hebrew national of Jewish origin, anti-Zionist, registered as Muslim and a citizen of an apartheid state – the State of Israel." A member of Fatah since 1984, he was elected to the Revolutionary Council for the Palestinian party in 2009.

== Background and education ==
Uri Davis was born in Jerusalem and grew up in and was educated in Kfar Shmaryahu. His parents were Jewish immigrants who had come to Mandatory Palestine during the Fifth Aliyah. His mother Blanka was from Czechoslovakia and his father Joseph was from the United Kingdom. Davis describes himself as a Palestinian Hebrew. During the 1961–1963 period he worked on Kibbutz Erez as an alternative form of national service to military conscription. Subsequently, he received a BA in Philosophy and Arabic from the Hebrew University of Jerusalem (1968), a Masters in Philosophy from the same institution (1970) and from The New School for Social Research, New York City an MA in Anthropology (1973) and a PhD in Anthropology (1976).

== Career ==
Davis was appointed to a position in the University of Bradford's Department of Peace Studies by Professor Adam Curle soon after the Department's founding in 1973. He is an honorary research fellow at the University of Durham's Institute for Middle Eastern and Islamic Studies (IMEIS) and at the University of Exeter's Institute of Arab and Islamic Studies (IAIS). He currently divides his residence between the predominantly Arab city of Sakhnin in northern Israel and the mixed city of Ramle in central Israel. In 2009, Uri Davis was appointed to teach a course at the Palestinian Al-Quds university on critical Israeli studies.

=== Apartheid comparisons ===
Davis wrote a series of books and articles that classify the State of Israel as an apartheid state, alleging that Israel's policies towards Palestinians, including Palestinian citizens of Israel, are comparable to South Africa's apartheid policies: Israel: An Apartheid State (1987), Apartheid Israel: A Critical Reading of the Draft Permanent Agreement, known as the "Geneva Accords" (2003), and Apartheid Israel: Possibilities for the Struggle Within (2003).

In an interview to The Irish Times in 2002 Davis said: "I am an anti-militarist and recognise the right to use force in certain instances, in armed resistance, which is legal in international law. It allows armed resistance, the targeting of the opposite party in uniform."

=== Activism ===
He is a founding member of The Movement Against Israeli Apartheid in Palestine (MAIAP) and of Al-Beit The Association for the Defense of Human Rights in Israel, and a former member of the Executive Committee of the Council for the Advancement of Arab-British Understanding (CAABU) and of the Editorial Board of RETURN magazine. He is also a member of Academia for Equality, an organization working to promote democratization, equality and access to higher education for all communities living in Israel.

=== Revolutionary Council election ===
Until 2009 Davis was Observer Member of the Palestine National Council. In 2009, Davis was successful in his bid for a seat on Fatah's Revolutionary Council, a legislative body of the Movement, placing 31st from among more than 600 candidates running for position in the 128-member body. He is the first person of Jewish origin to be elected to such a high-ranking position. He was re-elected in 2016, taking the 29th place.

== 2008 marriage and conversion to Islam ==
Davis met Miyassar Abu Ali, a Palestinian, in Ramallah in 2006. They signed their Certificate of Marriage ('Aqd al-Zawaj) there in 2008, after Davis converted to Islam at their marriage.

== Selected bibliography ==
- Dissent & Ideology in Israel: Resistance to the Draft 1948-1973 (as co-editor, with Martin Blatt and Paul Kleinbaum) (1975) ISBN 0-903729-07-5
- Documents from Israel, 1967-73: Readings for a Critique of Zionism (as co-editor, with Norton Mezvinsky) (1975) ISBN 0-903729-09-1
- Israel & the Palestinians (as co-editor, with Andrew Mack and Nira Yuval-Davis) (1975) ISBN 0-903729-13-X
- Israel: Utopia Incorporated - A Study of Class, State and Corporate Kin Control (1977) ISBN 0-905762-12-6
- Deir al-Asad: The Destiny of an Arab Village in Galilee, in Palestinian Arabs in Israel: Two Case Studies, Ithaca Press, London 1977, (as co-editor, with Hasan Amun, and Nasr Dakhlallah San´Allah) ISBN 0-903729-32-6
- Towards a Socialist Republic of Palestine (as co-editor, with Fouzi El Asmar and Naim Khader) (1978) ISBN 0-903729-30-X
- Debate on Palestine (as co-editor, with Fouzi El Asmar and Naim Khader) (1981) ISBN 0-903729-64-4
- Israel: An Apartheid State (1987) ISBN 0-86232-317-7
- The Jewish National Fund (with Walter Lehn) (1988) ISBN 0-7103-0053-0
- The State of Palestine (Jerusalem Study Series) (1991) ISBN 0-86372-135-4
- Crossing the Border: an autobiography of an Anti-Zionist Palestinian Jew (1995) ISBN 1-86102-002-3
- Citizenship and the State: A Comparative Study of Citizenship Legislation in Israel, Jordan, Palestine, Syria and Lebanon (London, 1997) ISBN 0-86372-218-0
- Citizenship and the State in the Middle East: Approaches and Applications (as co-editor) (Syracuse, New York, 2000) ISBN 0-8156-2829-3
- Apartheid Israel: Possibilities for the Struggle Within (2004) ISBN 1-84277-339-9

== See also ==
- Uri Avnery
- Adam Keller
