= Mesarvot =

Israeli human rights organization

Mesarvot (Hebrew: מסרבות, lit. 'Refusers (fem.)') is an Israeli organization supporting conscientious objectors in their total refusal to serve in the Israel Defense Forces. The organization has existed since 2015 and provides a network for public attention and legal support of youth refusing to join the army and former conscientious objectors.

== Activities ==
The organization publicises cases of youth that completely refuse to serve in the Israel Defense Forces (IDF) and promotes public discourse on the topic, supports conscientious objectors legally and with media trainings, during imprisonment and provides community for young people who make the decision to refuse. The organization supports hundreds of people every year. Usually, young people they support refuse to serve in the army to protest Israel's occupation of Palestinian territories and to stand in solidarity with Palestinians.

=== Notable refuseniks supported by Mesarvot ===
Mesarvot has provided legal and media support for numerous high-profile refuseniks who served time in military prison. Some notable cases include:

- Tair Kaminer (2016) - Served 170 days in military prison, one of the longest sentences for a female conscientious objector in Israel.
- Aiden Katri (2016) - The first transgender woman to be jailed for refusing to join the army.
- Noa Gur Golan (2017) - Served 98 days in prison; she and her mother were targeted in a smear campaign by the right-wing tabloid Israel Hayom.
- Ofir Averbukh (2017) - Released after serving 150 days in military prison.
- Adam Rafaelov (2018) - Imprisoned seven times for his refusal to be stationed in the occupied territories.
- Maya Brand-Feigenbaum (2019) - Imprisoned multiple times for her refusal.
- Roman Levin (2019) - A former soldier who became a refusenik after spending over a year as a truck driver in the military, sentenced to 30 days in prison.
- Hallel Rabin (2020) - Served 56 days in military prison before being released by the military's conscientious objectors committee.
- Tal Mitnick and Sofia Orr (2023–2024) - The first to refuse enlistment following the outbreak of the Gaza war in October 2023, calling for an immediate ceasefire and an international arms embargo.
- Itamar Greenberg (2024–2025) - An Israeli teenager who refused conscription during the Gaza war, stating his refusal to wear a uniform that he believed symbolized "killing and oppression." Greenberg served 197 days in military prison—the longest sentence for an Israeli conscientious objector in over a decade—before being released in March 2025.
- Ella Keidar Greenberg (2025) - The first openly transgender conscientious objector in a decade. Sentenced to military prison in March 2025 for refusing the draft, Keidar Greenberg publicly articulated her ideological opposition to both the Gaza War and the broader Israeli occupation. A prominent activist with Mesarvot and the Youth Communist League, she closely linked her refusal to her transgender identity, framing her objection as a rejection of the patriarchal and capitalist systems she believes the military enforces.

== Political positions ==
The organization describes itself as feminist and criticizes patriarchal structures in the IDF as well as sexual harassment.

Mesarvot is part of the Anti-Occupation Bloc, an alliance of Israeli and Palestinian organisations advocating against the Israeli occupation of Palestine. In 2022, Mesarvot staged a protest in Tel Aviv to mourn the killing of the Palestinian journalist Shireen Abu Akleh by the IDF while reporting in the West Bank. The group also participates in solidarity actions in the West Bank. In February 2023, Mesarvot activists joined protests against the eviction of Palestinian buildings in Masafer Yatta.

Mesarvot also participated in the 2023 Israeli judicial reform protests and connected the planned reform with the government's occupation policies.
