= Tair Kaminer =

Israel Defense Forces draft resister

Tair Kaminer (Hebrew: תאיר קמינר) is an Israeli conscientious objector. In 2016, Kaminer served six consecutive prison terms, totaling 160 days, for her refusal to enlist in the Israel Defense Forces, the longest imprisonment of any female objector.

== Refusal to enlist and prison sentence ==
In January 2016, Kaminer, then-19, was arrested for her refusal to enlist in the Israel Defense Forces. Kaminer said she viewed the Israeli occupation of Palestinian territories as a human rights violation and did not want to participate in the IDF's activities targeting Palestinians. She was sentenced to 20 days at a military center in Tel HaShomer. Her imprisonment was met with a small protest of around 40 individuals, among them her cousin Matan Kaminer, who was sentenced to two years in prison for his refusal to enlist in 2003, citing concerns for Palestinian welfare and opposition to the occupation of Palestinian territories. The protest was organized by then-newly formed Israeli anti-war organization Mesarvot.

Kaminer was arrested and imprisoned on six occasions, serving a total of 160 days. Kaminer did not seek an exemption from military service but she was granted one involuntarily after her sixth arrest, with a judge declaring her unfit for service due to "a history of poor behavior."

== Reaction ==
According to The Independent, the goal of Tair Kaminer for refusal is the reformation of laws punishing conscientious objectors, but she has been known as a traitor.

The ordered demonstrations have been held out of her prison and the training bases for soldiers by objectors.

The Green Party MP stated to Brighton Pavilion : “With tensions high in Israel, this is a particularly difficult time to be a conscientious objector … (we call) on the Government to request the Israeli authorities to accept the conscientious objection of Israeli citizens who do not wish to bear arms against a civilian population under military occupation.” when this statement was mentioned at the Houses of Parliament, Amnesty International Israel controverted it. Some parties confirmed this statement like Labour, Scottish National Party, the Conservatives and Plaid Cymru for the legal impunity for demurrer of Israeli's military service such as Tair Kaminer.

== See also ==
- Israeli–Palestinian conflict
- Itamar Greenberg, an Israeli conscientious objector who served 197 days in prison between 2024 and 2025
- Mesarvot, an Israeli organization dedicated to the support of conscientious objectors
