= Fouzi El Asmar =

Palestinian-American writer and journalist (1937–2013)

- Born: 1937; Haifa, Mandatory Palestine
- Died: 19 September 2013 (aged 75–76); Bethesda, Maryland, USA
- Education: University of Exeter
- Occupation: Journalist
- Writing career
- Language: Arabic
- Genres: Non-fiction; Poetry
- Notable work: To Be an Arab in Israel

Fouzi El Asmar (1937–2013) was a Palestinian-American writer, poet and journalist. He was the author of the book entitled To Be an Arab in Israel.

== Early life and education ==
El Asmar was born in Haifa, Mandatory Palestine, in 1937. His father was a station master in Lydda where he was raised.

El Asmar obtained a degree in history and political science from an American university. He received his Ph.D. in Arabic and Islamic studies from the University of Exeter. His supervisor was Uri Davis.

== Career and activities ==
El Asmar lived in Israel and was a cofounder and member of the Al Ard movement. He joined the editorial board of the literary magazine Al Fajr in 1958 and was named as the editor of the magazine Hadha Al Alam in 1966.

El Asmar left Israel in 1972 after he was released from prison and settled in the USA becoming a US citizen in 1981. After he completed his graduate studies in England he worked as the managing editor of the daily newspaper Asharq Al-Awsat. Then he served as the bureau chief of the Emirates News Agency in Washington, D.C. He also contributed to the Saudi Arabian daily newspaper Al Riyadh as a columnist.

El Asmar published various books, including To Be an Arab in Israel (1975) and Through the Hebrew Looking Glass: Arab Stereotypes in Children’s Literature (1986). The former is his political autobiography and has been translated into various languages. He edited two books, Towards a Socialist Republic of Palestine and Debate on Palestine, with Uri Davies and Naim Khader.

His poetry collections include The Promised Land (1969), Poems from an Israeli Prison (1973), Dreams on a mattress of thorns (1976) and The Wind-Driven Reed and Other Poems (1979). El Asmar also published articles and book reviews in journals.

=== Imprisonment ===
El Asmar was arrested by the Israeli forces and put under administrative detention in Ramlah and Damon prisons in 1969. While there, he was visited by US lawyer Alan Dershowitz, who presented himself as a civil rights activist researching an article on administrative detention. After speaking to El Asmar, Dershowitz met both the Israeli Attorney General and the head of the Shin Bet (who showed him the "voluminous" file on El Asmar). In the article, published in Commentary magazine, Dershowitz justified the practice of administrative detention (which he called "preventive detention"), and described El Asmar as "extremely dangerous" and "the leader of a terrorist gang". A subsequent issue of the magazine published letters from El Asmar himself, lawyer Felicia Langer, and civil rights activist Israel Shahak noting Dershowitz's many factual errors and rebutting his "outright distortions".

== Personal life and death ==
El Asmar was married to Maria T. El Asmar who died in August 2013.

El Asmar died in Bethesda, Maryland, on 19 September 2013. He was buried in Palestine on 1 October.
