= Academia for Equality =

Israeli academic association

Academia for Equality (A4E; Hebrew: אקדמיה לשוויון) is a members' organization working to promote democratization, equality and access to higher education for all communities living in Israel. The organization numbers more than 600 Israeli members, from universities and colleges both in Israel and abroad, including students, researchers, and lecturers. The members of the organization struggle against the complicity of Israeli academia in the occupied Palestinian territories, and actively combat abusive labour relations, sexual harassment, and the silencing of critical voices in Israel and around the world. Prominent members include Joel Beinin, Uri Davis, Neve Gordon, Alon Harel, Rela Mazali, Vered Slonim-Nevo, and Oren Yiftachel.

== Establishment and goals ==
Academy for Equality is a members’ organization established in 2015, which numbers more than 600 members from different higher education institutions. Academy for Equality is an extra-institutional organization, which accommodates academics of all levels, who are committed to promoting structural changes for achieving an academy free of violence and discrimination. The organization operated democratically, and holds public discussion on different issues, according to the principles of transparency and wide consent. The organization's board is elected in an annual meeting, in which every member can participate. Academia for Equality is a grassroots movement that is organized through small teams or projects led by members, which are supported by the elected board. Each team is responsible for organizing its own members in Israel and abroad, and for communicating its actions and plans to the board and to the broader membership.

== Teams and projects ==
Academy for Equality has several teams who are regularly working to promote the organizations vision and goals.

=== First-generations in higher education ===
The team advances awareness to "first-generation" as an intersectional policy tool in an effort to tackle institutional blindness to the issue, and address the enormous challenges of diversity work in the context of Israeli academia. Academia for Equality attempts to deal with these multiple forms and challenges of inequality, exclusion and discrimination in higher education through raising awareness, setting the agenda, and supporting and participating in a special workshop designed to provide a space of learning and support for first-generation graduate students in Israeli academia. These workshops are held both in Hebrew and in Arabic, and have taken place in Tel Aviv University, Ben Gurion University in the Negev, and the Hebrew University in Jerusalem.

=== Fighting sexual harassment ===
The team advances a political discourse, that encourages taking responsibility for the widespread complicity in its perpetuation. The team supports and accompanies victims of sexual harassment throughout the various stages of their struggle; organizes public events, gathers information from a broad range of institutions and sources, makes it accessible, and advocates for better institutional policies for handling reports and complaints.

=== Labor struggles ===
The team supports labor struggles in Israeli academia; develops critical knowledge on the conditions of precarity and exploitation in the Israeli context, as well as works towards the establishment of broad cooperation and better coordination between various de-centralized struggles and among various labor unions representing the most vulnerable sections of the academic and the administrative staff, including the cleaners and the adjunct staff.

=== Neoliberalism ===
The team makes critical knowledge on academia available, accessible and relevant to the general public and to Israeli academic institutions. The team promotes a struggle against the neoliberal culture of academia, and opposed the use of arbitrary quantitative matrices during the hiring process. Academy for equality holds public events, where critical knowledge on academia is shared and disseminated, and connects with critical movements in the global academy such as rethink the university, the open-source movement, and the decolonizing the university movement.

=== Solidarity with Palestinian Academia ===
The team works to develop in a responsible and ethical way ties and solidarity relations with individual Palestinian academics and academic institutions. Academia for Equality advance solidarity work among other things by turning the spotlight on Israeli academy complicity and collusion with the occupation, militarization, and the repression of Palestinian academia. The organization protests violations of academic freedoms, as well as of Palestinian basic rights and freedoms.

The team has previously been involved in several activities, including the joint international campaign launched in 2016 by University of Kadoorie and Academia for Equality demanding the removal of military forces from campus territories, monitoring the imprisonment of Palestinian academics and students from the west bank and supporting their release, cooperation with the international organization "Scientists for Palestine" and Palestinian academics in the struggle against academic freedom violations committed by Israel, the establishment of the "complicit academy" database that documents the involvement of Israeli academia in the occupation, and the struggle against the cooperation between the IDF and the Hebrew University of Jerusalem through the intelligence unit "Havatzalot" as well as other activities at the Mount Scopus campus directed and the adjacent neighborhood Isawiya. This activity has gained the support of the European Anthropological society, as well as the human rights committee of the Middle East Studies Association (MESA). The organization has also worked to stop the cooperation between the medicine faculty of Tel Aviv University and Ariel University, which the organization defines as an "apartheid institution"

=== Global Solidarity work ===
The team works to establish ties with and support individuals and institutions whose academic freedoms are threatened. The organization supports academics who are subject to various pressures through campaigns of intimidation and harassment, including academics who are accused of being antisemitic for criticizing Israel, as well as other types of social and political persecution. The organization has sounded protest in cases where academic freedom was violated due to political reasons, including in the case of Lara Al Qasem, the cancellation of a lecture at the Free University of Berlin by the Palestinian research Lila Sharif due to political pressure, and ending the search for candidates for a professorship named after Edward Said at Fresno University in California because all the candidates were of Arab origin. The organization was one of the first to demand an inquiry into the circumstances that forced Dr Dotan Leshem, a member of the organization, to leave the Haifa University due to his public speech and public activity. In January 2018 the organization dispatched a delegation to Turkey to support the academics who were persecuted there by the regime for signing a peace petition.

== See also ==
- Academic boycott of Israel

== External ==
- Official website (English)
- Official website (Hebrew)
- Official website (Arabic)
