= Youth Against Dictatorship =

2023 Israeli youth organisation and open letter

- Part of the 2023 Israeli judicial reform protests and Israeli criticism of the occupation of Palestine
- Date: 3 September 2023
- Location: Herzliya Hebrew Gymnasium, Tel Aviv, Israel
- Type: Signing of open letter
- Participants: 230 youth signatories; over 400 other attendees

Youth Against Dictatorship (Hebrew: נוער נגד דיקטטורה, romanized: Noar neged diktatura) is a youth organisation in Israel. On 3 September 2023, they released an open letter signed by 230 young conscientious objectors, who collectively declared their refusal to serve in the Israel Defense Forces (IDF), their opposition to serving Israeli settlements, and their desire for an end to the Israeli occupation of the Palestinian territories.

== Background ==
Israel Defense Forces (IDF) service is compulsory for most young Israeli adults, and refusal to serve in the IDF is extremely controversial. While small groups of Israeli youth have refused to serve in the past as a protest against Israeli policies toward Palestinians, conscientious objectors are rarely exempted from military service, and are generally incarcerated in military prison for a period of time as a result of their refusal.

The 2023 Israeli judicial reform led to widespread protests in Israel, as well as announcements by IDF reservists that they would not appear for volunteer duty. The practice of refusing to serve in the Israeli military became more mainstream as a result; polling of Israeli youth has shown increasing support for refusal.

== Open letter ==
=== Planning ===
The Youth Against Dictatorship organization and letter began as a conversation between friends in high school. The signatories are all teens – 11th and 12th graders as well as recent graduates – in the midst of the Israeli military draft process. While some youth who signed the letter decided to do so as a result of the recent protests, others already intended to refuse to serve before the current Israeli government came to power.

Over 200 Israeli teens signed onto the open letter in late August 2023, and planned an event at Herzliya Hebrew Gymnasium on 3 September 2023, during which they would release the letter publicly. Despite pressure from the Israeli government to cancel the event, school principal Ze'ev Degani refused to cancel, and resigned in protest when the school's board of directors voted to follow the government's directions. The teenagers chose to hold the event regardless, and Degani later rescinded his resignation.

=== Event ===
What begins as a localized attack on democracy, a compromise on the principles of justice and equality in a certain place, against certain people, will sooner or later spread, spilling over into every corner, filling every crevice, and growing to monstrous proportions, consuming even the one who created it.

— Yahli Agai, speaking at the Youth Against Dictatorship eventi

On the afternoon of 3 September 2023, after school hours ended, more than 400 peers and supporters of the Youth Against Dictatorship signatories gathered outside Herzliya Hebrew Gymnasium in Tel Aviv. A report in Haaretz described the crowd as a mix of "older protesters in sunhats" with "pierced and dyed teens".

Recent high school graduate Yahli Agai spoke on behalf of the 230 youth who signed the letter, explaining that they were motivated both by the recent rise to power of a far-right government in Israel and by historic Israeli policies since the state was first established. She explicitly criticized politicians involved in the recent judicial reforms, including Yariv Levin and Simcha Rothman, but stated that the reforms were "born from the demons that Israeli society hid in the closet" – similarly to the way that "the water cannon and skunk that were regularly used to disperse demonstrations by Palestinians, Ethiopians, and ultra-Orthodox Jews [...] have now become a regular sight for the average Ashkenazi-secular protester."

The event also included workshops led by residents of Sheikh Jarrah and representatives from Breaking the Silence, as well as Banki (a communist youth group made up of Arabs and Jews), environmentalist group One Climate, and transgender justice group Gila Project.

=== Content ===
The Youth Against Dictatorship open letter explicitly linked the conscientious objectors' refusal to serve with the Israeli occupation of the Palestinian territories, declaring that they would refuse to serve "until democracy is secured for all who live within the jurisdiction of the Israeli government." One of the members of the group who was interviewed by Haaretz stated that:

The overhaul really opened their eyes to refusing because of it – and opened their eyes politically in general, making them think about the occupation, and how they don’t want to serve in an occupying military. I don’t think you can separate the judicial overhaul and the occupation. You can see that through the people enacting it: Smotrich, Rothman and Ben-Gvir – They're all settlers.

== Responses ==
Right-wing movement Im Tirtzu arranged a small but loud counter-protest at the event, chanting against draft refusal.

IDF Chief of Staff Herzi Halevi condemned the letter, stating that "anyone who is considering not enlisting should ask themselves what would happen if everyone behaved like them."
