= Radical Bloc =

Israeli far-left, anti-zionist organization

- הגוש הרדיקלי / كتله راديكاليه
- The logo used by the Radical Bloc on its various platforms
- Formation: 2020; 6 years ago
- Founded at: Jaffa, Tel Aviv
- Headquarters: Jaffa, Tel Aviv
- Official language: Arabic, Hebrew

Radical Bloc is an Israeli far-left organization, and a contingent of the Hadash party, based in Jaffa, Tel Aviv. The group was formed alongside the Anti-Occupation Bloc in the 2020–2021 protests against Benjamin Netanyahu, but is known to be more radical, anti-zionist and anti-militaristic then the Anti-Occupation Bloc.

== History ==
=== Early phase ===
The Radical Bloc was created in 2020 during the 2020-2021 protests against Benjamin Netanyahu. Despite working closely with the Anti-Occupation Bloc, the movement has always been staunchly anti-zionist, bringing several Palestinian flags to protests from 2020 to 2023. Throughout this period, the group faced verbal and even physical attacks by other protesters, especially when holding onto Palestinian symbols, gaining a negative reputations among many participants.

The movement rallied alongside the Anti-Occupation Bloc and other leftist organizations and parties during the 2023 Israeli judicial reform protests up until its latter phase. During the protests they openly criticized the evictions of Palestinians in Sheikh Jarrah, which had occurred in the 2021 Israel–Palestine crisis, and protested Zionism.

=== Recent developments ===
After the start of the Gaza War, on 7 October 2023, the group's positions started to become controversial even to its own allies. In November 2023, the Anti-Occupation Bloc officially cut its support and relations with the Radical Bloc, ending its occasional partnerships with the Bloc due to the RB's statements on the Israeli's actions in Gaza, calling them genocidal in nature.

The RB kept up with its protests over the years, protesting US arm trade to Israel outside the US embassy back in 2024, organizing locally in a peaceful manner and in September 2025 gathered near the border of the Gaza Strip to denounce the Gaza War, the Israeli blockade and support the Global Sumud Flotilla. In response to the interception of the Global Sumud Flotilla, the Radical Bloc held a protest in Tel Aviv during which they painted slogans on city streets including "Zionism is a death cult" and "We are conducting a holocaust in Gaza".

== Ideology ==
The group can be identified as a radical leftist organization which opposes militarism, Jewish supremacy, corruption, apartheid policies, zionism, Israeli settlements in the West Bank and genocide. They are supportive of the recognition of a Palestinian State, a two state solution and LGBTQ rights.

== Demography ==
The group is made up of Tel Avivim Israeli Jews and Israeli Arabs, adopting two official languages and appealing to both groups.
