= Naim Khader =

Palestinian diplomat (1939–1981)

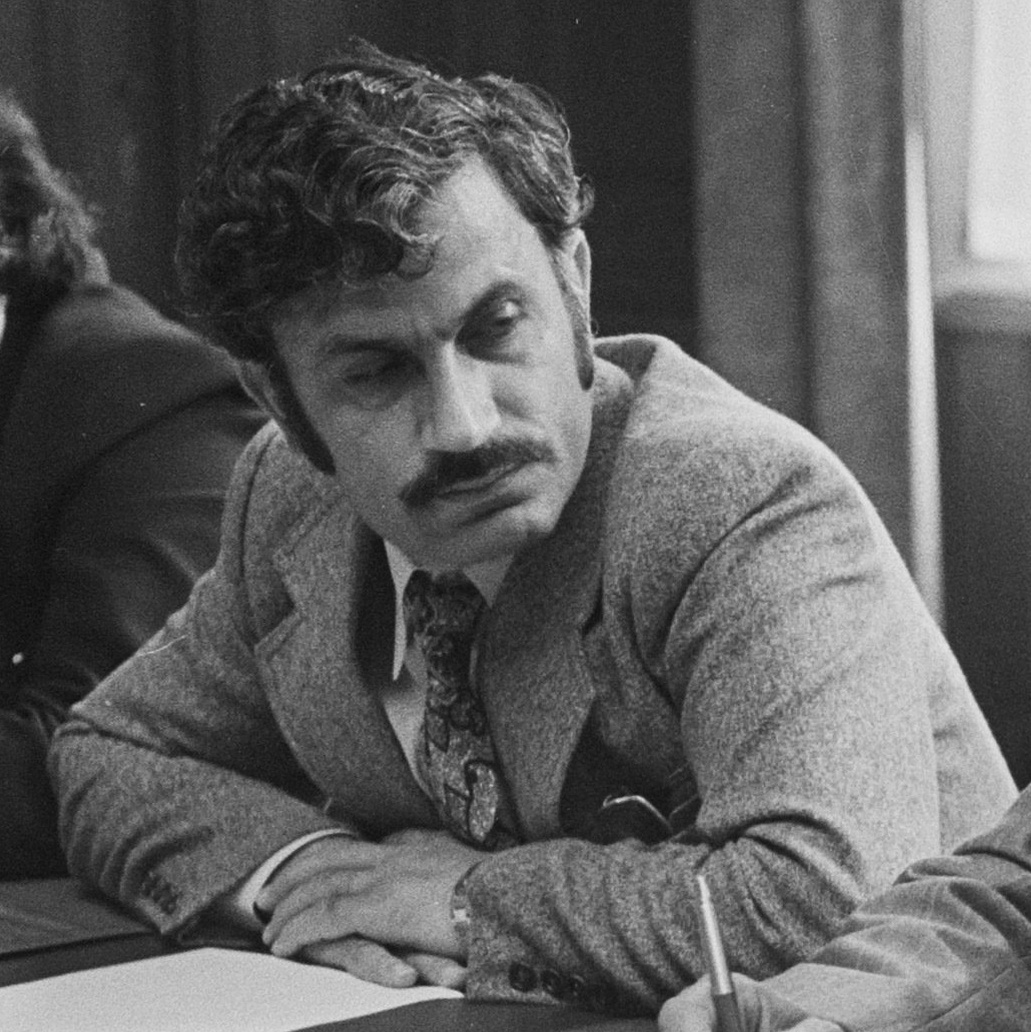
- Born: 30 December 1939; Zababdeh, Mandatory Palestine
- Died: 1 June 1981 (aged 41); Brussels, Belgium
- Cause of death: Assassination
- Burial place: Amman, Jordan
- Education: Université catholique de Louvain; Université libre de Bruxelles
- Years active: 1960s–1981
- Movement: Fatah
- Spouse: Bernadette Khader

Naim Khader (1939–1981) was the representative of the Palestine Liberation Organization (PLO) in Belgium. He was assassinated in Brussels on 1 June 1981. The assassination remains unsolved.

== Early life and education ==
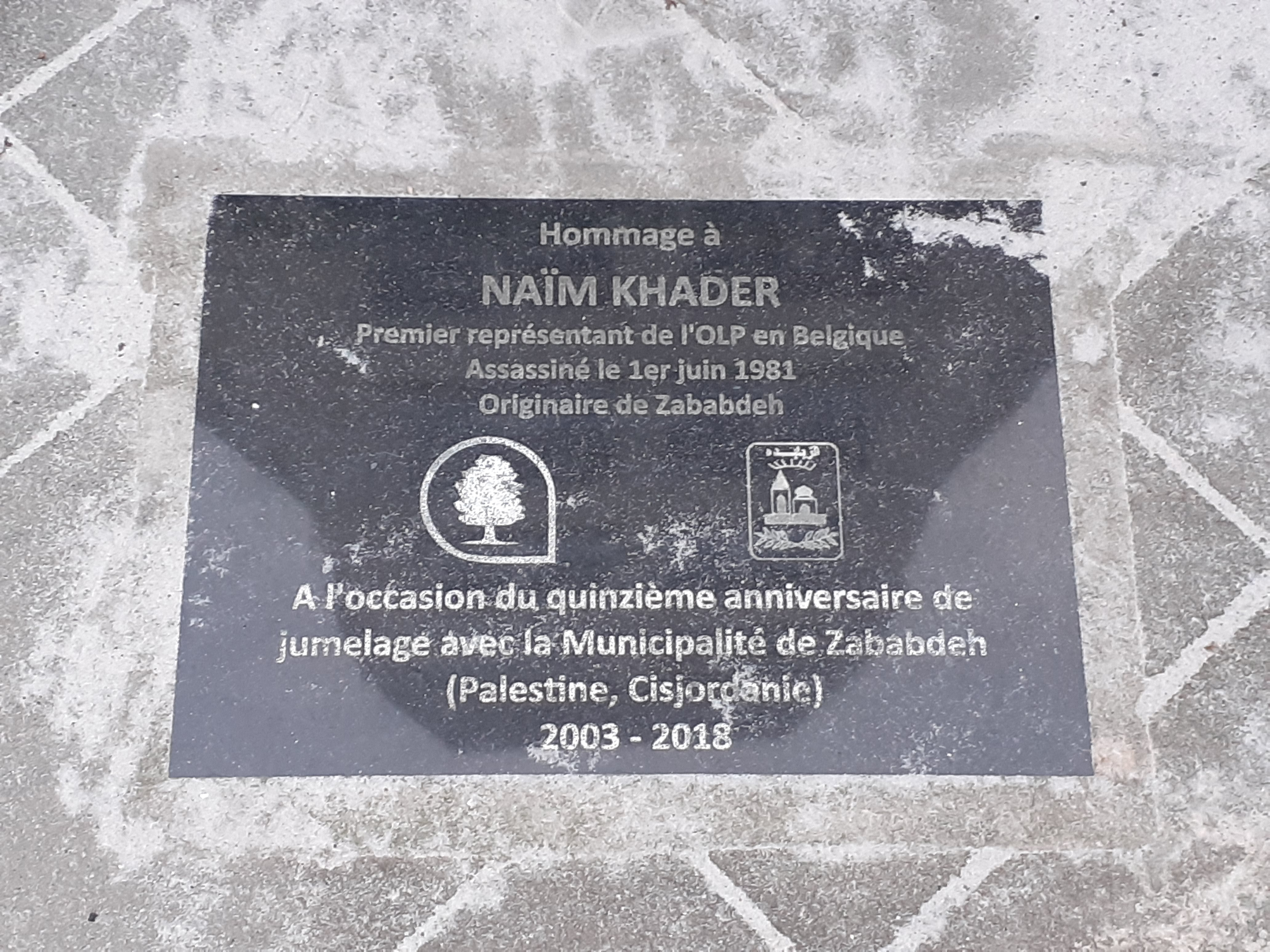
Naim Khader Plaque in Ixelles, Brussels

Khader was born in Zababdeh, Mandatory Palestine, on 30 December 1939. He hailed from a Catholic family. His father was a farmer and died when Naim was nine years old. He had six siblings, and his youngest brother, Bichara Khader, is a professor emeritus at the Université libre de Bruxelles.

Naim Khader attended the Latin Theological Seminary in Beit Jala from 1958 where he studied theology, philosophy and music. He graduated from the Seminary in 1964. He was also educated by the Latin Fathers in Jerusalem.

Khader settled in Belgium in 1966. Next year he became a member of the Fatah. He held a master's degree in law from Université catholique de Louvain and a PhD in international law from the Université libre de Bruxelles.

== Career and activities ==
Following his graduation from the Seminary Khader served as a teacher at the Terra Sancta High School in Amman, Jordan, in 1964. He taught courses on religion, Arabic, English, French and music until 1965.

After receiving his PhD Khader was employed as the head of press office at the embassy of Saudi Arabia in Belgium and then he worked in the same post at the Arab League office in Brussels. He was appointed PLO's representative in Brussels in 1976 when the PLO's information and liaison office was established. He also served as a PLO representative at the European Parliament. He was a member of the Foreign Affairs Committee of the Palestinian National Council.

Khader was appointed representative of the PLO to France which would be officially announced around 15 June 1981.

Khader edited two books, Towards a Socialist Republic of Palestine and Debate on Palestine, with Uri Davies and Fouzi El Asmar.

== Assassination ==
Khader was assassinated in the early hours of 1 July 1981 in front of his home in Ixelles municipality of Brussels. He died there instantly. The PLO claimed that the perpetrator was an Israeli agent which was denied by the Israeli Embassy in Belgium.

A Palestinian man living in Vienna was tried for the assassination of Khader in 1999 and was acquitted by the court. Boaz Ganor and Liram Koblentz-Stenzler argue that Khader was one of the assassination targets of Israel.

== Funeral service and burial ==
A funeral service was performed for him at a Brussels church on 5 June 1981. His coffin was brought to Beirut the same day, and another ceremony for Khader was organized at a church with the attendance of Yasser Arafat, the PLO leader. The funeral service at the church was also attended by the Belgian and Turkish ambassadors to Lebanon and three Belgian members of the European Parliament. Then Khader was buried in the Christian cemetery of Oum El Hirav, a few kilometers south of Amman.

== Personal life ==
Khader married a Belgian woman, Bernadette Khader (née Reynebeau), in 1972.

== Legacy ==
Robert Verdussen published the biography of Naim Khader in 2001 with the title Naim Khader: prophète foudroyé du peuple palestinien: biographie. His brother, Bichara, also published a book in memory of him.

One of the streets in his hometown, Zababdeh, was named after Naim Khader. In addition, on 25 September 2025, a street in Ixelles was named in his honour. A documentary entitled La route d'El Naim was produced by the French-language public broadcaster RTBF, in collaboration with Temps Present.
