= Ometz LeSarev =

Organization of Israeli military personnel refusing to serve beyond the 1967 borders

Ometz LeSarev (Hebrew: אומץ לסרב, Courage to Refuse) is an organization of reserve officers and soldiers of the Israel Defense Forces (IDF) who refuse to serve beyond the 1967 borders, but "shall continue serving in the Israel Defense Forces in any mission that serves Israel's defense." These conscientious objectors refer to themselves as refuseniks, a reference to the refusenik Jews of Soviet Russia. In 2004, Courage to Refuse and one of its founders, social activist David Zonsheine, were nominated for the Nobel Peace Prize by 1992 winner Rigoberta Menchú and 1996 winner Carlos Filipe Ximenes Belo.

== History ==
The movement began in January 2002 at the initiative of social activist and IDF reserve officer David Zonsheine and his fellow officer Yaniv Iczkovits, who drafted, then published an ad in the Israeli mainstream-left daily Haaretz signed by a nucleus of 51 reserve officers and soldiers. This would later come to be known as "The Soldiers' Letter" or "The Combatants' Letter." Three years later the number of signatories had reached over 600. The group started within the period of the Al-Aqsa Intifada.

By the time of the 2023 Gaza war, the founders were divided. Now-writer Iczkovits, while still a critic of the occupation and successive Netanyahu governments, rejoined the army to fight Hamas. Zonsheine, with relatives among the Israeli dead and kidnapped during the Hamas attack, asks for a ceasefire. Tamir Sorek, in retrospect, sees the language of the letter as "too patriotic" and inappropriate towards a joint Israeli-Palestinian activism.

== Reception ==
At first, the IDF responded by sentencing any refusenik who refused to serve in the West Bank and Gaza Strip to jail. Seeing that this was not a deterrent and only raised awareness of refusal within the populace, it has stepped down its efforts and has simply stopped calling on the refuseniks or sent them to alternate duties within the 1967 borders – those borders that existed prior to the 1967 Six-Day War.

There are differing opinions in the Israeli public regarding the organization. The right wing opposes the movement, claiming its activities amount to treason during wartime and that activists' refusal to serve encourages Palestinians to step up suicide bombings in order to break Israeli society.

The left wing, which opposes the occupation, is split between those who see refusal as a legitimate political tool and those who believe that it is unlawful and only serves to undermine the IDF's and the Israeli peace camp's standing within the populace. Israeli left-wing activist professor Amnon Rubinstein has warned that the refusal to serve by soldiers on the left could encourage the refusal by soldiers on the right to remove Israeli settlements.

Courage to Refuse and one of its founders, David Zonsheine, were nominated for the Nobel Peace Prize in 2004.

== The refusenik letter ==
- We, reserve combat officers and soldiers of the Israel Defense Forces, who were raised upon the principles of Zionism, sacrifice and giving to the people of Israel and to the State of Israel, who have always served in the front lines, and who were the first to carry out any mission, light or heavy, in order to protect the State of Israel and strengthen it.
- We, combat officers and soldiers who have served the State of Israel for long weeks every year, in spite of the dear cost to our personal lives, have been on reserve duty all over the Occupied Territories, and were issued commands and directives that had nothing to do with the security of our country, and that had the sole purpose of perpetuating our control over the Palestinian people. We, whose eyes have seen the bloody toll this Occupation exacts from both sides.
- We, who sensed how the commands issued to us in the Territories, destroy all the values we had absorbed while growing up in this country.
- We, who understand now that the price of Occupation is the loss of IDF's human character and the corruption of the entire Israeli society.
- We, who know that the Territories are not Israel, and that all settlements are bound to be evacuated in the end.
- We hereby declare that we shall not continue to fight this War of the Settlements.
- We shall not continue to fight beyond the 1967 borders in order to dominate, expel, starve and humiliate an entire people.
- We hereby declare that we shall continue serving in the Israel Defense Forces in any mission that serves Israel's defense.
- The missions of occupation and oppression do not serve this purpose – and we shall take no part in them.

== See also ==
- Refusal to serve in the IDF
- Yesh Gvul
