= Progressive List for Peace =

Progressive List for Peace הרשימה המתקדמת לשלום القائمة التقدمية للسلام
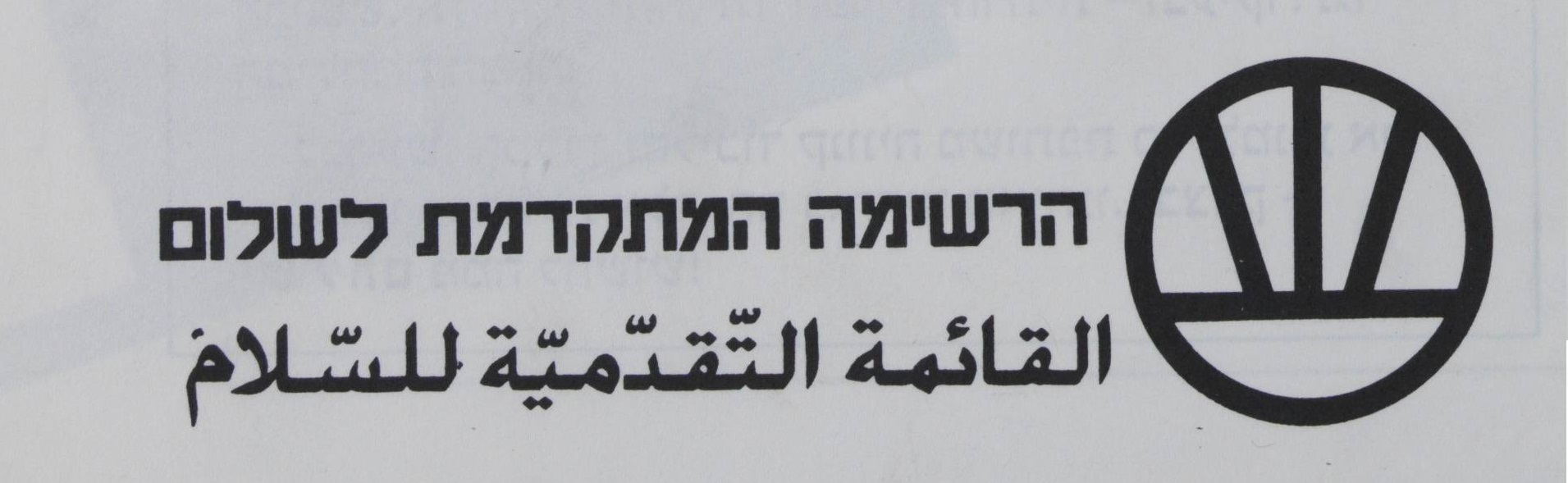
- Leader: Mohammed Miari
- Spokesperson: Adam Keller
- Founder: Mattityahu Peled; Meir Pa'il
- Founded: 1984
- Dissolved: c. 1995
- Split from: Hadash; Sheli
- Succeeded by: Balad
- Headquarters: Nazareth
- Newspaper: Al-Watan (The Homeland)
- Ideology: Arab–Jewish equality Two-state solution Non-Zionism; Socialism; Palestinian nationalism
- Political position: Left-wing
- Most MKs: 2 (1984–1988)
- Fewest MKs: 1 (1988–1992)

Election symbol
- פ

The Progressive List for Peace (Hebrew: הרשימה המתקדמת לשלום, HaReshima HaMitkademet LeShalom, Arabic: القائمة التقدمية للسلام, Al-qayimat Al-taqadumiat Lil-salami), was a left-wing political party in Israel.

The party was formed from an alliance of both Arab and Jewish left-wing activists. The former came from groups dissenting from Hadash's perceived monopoly on Arab-Israeli politics, especially in the majority-Arab city of Nazareth, while the latter came from the pacifist wing of the defunct Left Camp of Israel. The Progressives survived a protracted ban attempt by the Supreme Court for their criticism of Israel's mistreatment of Palestinians, which was perceived as denial of Israel's right to exist as a Jewish state.

In the 1984 elections, the party's co-leaders, Mohammed Miari and ex-IDF general Mattityahu Peled, were elected to the Knesset, with the latter losing his seat in the 1988 elections. The party lost its Jewish support over its support of Saddam Hussein's Iraq in the Gulf War, leading to Miari losing his seat in the 1992 elections. The Progressives subsequently dissolved, with a faction forming the Palestinian nationalist party Balad.

== History ==
=== Background ===
The political left in Israel was dominated by Labor Zionism. Before the 1980s, its standard-bearer, the Labor Party, did not support self-determination for Palestinians. The Palestinian Arab citizens of Israel historically tended to vote for the Labor Party's Arab satellite lists or the communist Maki party. In 1965, the anti-Zionist faction of Maki left to form Rakah, which took Maki's old role as the party representing Arab interests.

In 1973, Arab academics established a broad front with Rakah and trade unions to create the Progressive Nazareth Front (PNF), which won the 1975 Nazareth municipal elections, electing Tawfiq Ziad as mayor. In 1977, this alliance was expanded nationwide as the Democratic Front for Peace and Equality (Hadash), of which the PNF effectively acted as a branch.

In 1977, the pacifist left in Israel, who supported the creation of a Palestinian state, were organised into two political coalitions: Hadash and the Left Camp, composed mostly of Jews.

In 1979, students allied to the Progressive movement began to appear in universities in conjunction with Abnaa el-Balad, a Palestinian nationalist organisation.

In 1981, 77 members of the Progressive Nazareth Front departed to create the National Bloc, later renamed as the Nationalist Progressive Movement (NPM). They were critical of the communist domination of the PNF. The NPM won 4 seats in the 1983 Nazareth local election. In the same year, Al-Ansar, an organisation that wanted to contest Knesset elections, left Abna Al-Balad.

Towards the end of the Left Camp's existence, its former MK Uri Avnery became the first prolific Israeli figure to meet with Yasser Arafat, the leader of the Palestine Liberation Organisation, on 3 July 1982, during the Siege of Beirut. This cemented the already deep rift between Avnery's pro-negotiation faction of the party, which included Mattityahu Peled, and the more PLO-sceptic faction, led by Ran Cohen, who condemned Avnery's actions as 'fawning'. Peled rebutted by calling Cohen a 'war criminal', and subsequently led his faction out of the Left Camp to create the Alternativa Movement. The rump Left Camp dissolved into Ratz in 1984.

=== 1984 election ===
The Progressive List for Peace was formed in 1984 by the Alternativa, al-Ansar and the NPM, as well as other individuals. The NPM remained as a separate body. The party's formation was immediately met with intense criticism from various political groups in the country. PLP activists were faced down by supporters of the far-right Tehiya-Tzomet alliance. The Progressives accused both left-wing Zionists and Hadash of 'consistently fighting' any Arab political movement founded outside of their auspices.

The NPM emphasized the Palestinian identity of Palestinian Arabs in Israel. It gave the PLP the election symbol פ, to symbolise Palestine.

It contested the 1984 Knesset elections, winning two seats, taken by Mohammed Miari and Peled, in the same year that Meir Kahane's far-right Kach party first won a Knesset seat.

=== Attempted banning ===
In 1985, the Basic Law dealing with the Knesset was amended to add section 7a, "Prevention of Participation of Candidates List." This provision included:

A candidates' list shall not participate in elections to the Knesset if its objects or actions, expressly or by implication, include one of the following ... negation of the existence of the State of Israel as the state of the Jewish people.

The primary motivation for this amendment was to outlaw racist parties such as Kach, whose members had been involved in terrorism. However, to provide what was viewed as balance, the authors also sought to outlaw left-wing parties which they viewed as threatening the Jewish character of the state of Israel.

Although it is unclear exactly what might constitute "negation of the State of Israel as the state of the Jewish people", conceivably positions such as support for the one-state solution—creating a single state in Israel the West Bank and Gaza Strip, both Jewish and Arab—or support for granting Arabs the same rights to settle in Israel which Jews enjoy, might be included.

In 1986, 30 Arab members, mostly from the Triangle area, left the PLP over organisation struggles. The Progressives supported the First Intifada when it started in 1987. Most Jewish senior figures left the party in 1988.

On 17 June 1988 prior to the 1988 elections, the Central Elections Committee used this provision as a justification for banning the Progressive List for Peace from running in the election. The party appealed to the Supreme Court, which overruled the ban and permitted the PLP to run in the election. However, the Supreme Court did not overturn section 7(a): it merely held that the policies of the PLP did not fall under it.

According to the brief presented by Yossi Bard, himself a prominent member of the party, the PLP did not dispute the Jewish character of Israel, but asserted that that character must be interpreted as subject to Israel being a democracy—i.e., the Jewish character of Israel could not mean any discrimination against non-Jewish citizens, since such discrimination would by definition mean that Israel was not a democracy. Rather, the PLP held that since the majority of Israeli citizens were Jews, their culture and traditions would naturally greatly influence the overall culture of the country, and the PLP had no objection to that.

The Kach lawyers presented what they claimed was a kind of "mirror image brief", in which they asserted that Kach had no objection to the democratic character of Israel, but asserted that that character must be interpreted as subject to Israel being a Jewish State—i.e., the democratic character of Israel could not mean any infringement of the pre-eminent position of Jews in all spheres of Israeli life, since such infringement would mean that Israel was not a Jewish state (at least, not what Kach regarded as "a Jewish state"). Rather, Kach held that it had no objection to state officials being elected in free elections and that political parties and organizations be granted freedom of speech, as long as political and economic power was kept exclusively in the hands of Jews.

The Supreme Court broke the "symmetry" by accepting the PLP brief and rejecting that of Kach, that overturning the banning of the former and upholding that of latter. That ruling created a milestone precedent in Israeli constitutional jurisprudence by establishing that supporting equal rights for Israeli Arabs does not consist of denying Israel's character as a Jewish democratic state, while opposing equality for Israeli Arabs is a violation.

=== Adam Keller court martial ===
In April 1988, Adam Keller, the PLP spokesperson, was arrested by military police while on a term of the reserve military duty obligatory to all Israeli Jewish males. He was charged with having written graffiti on 117 tanks and other military vehicles, exhorting soldiers to refuse service in the Occupied Territories, and with having taken down the standing orders from a military billboard and replaced them with PLP leaflets expressing "anger and protest" at "the systematic killing of Palestinian unarmed demonstrators" and calling for "the creation of an independent Palestinian state, side-by-side with Israel". Keller admitted the acts attributed to him and actually took pride in them and declared them to be praiseworthy rather than a criminal offence. Both under interrogation and at his trial, Keller repeatedly reiterated that he had acted completely alone, without any involvement by other members of the party or of the party as such, that the PLP leaflets were left over in his bag from a meeting which he attended on the night before his call-up order, and that he had not brought them to the army with any premeditated intention of exposing soldiers to them but rather had placed them on the military billboard as a sudden reaction to radio news of especially harsh acts of oppression by soldiers on the West Bank.

Keller's testimony on this was accepted, and no legal steps were taken against any other members of the PLP or against the party as a whole, though some right-wing columnists and politicians urged such steps to be taken. However, Keller's wife Beate Zilversmidt was received with a standing ovation at the PLP's conference, held in Nazareth during the second month of his incarceration, and the party members—even though not consulted in advance—clearly approved of his act.

=== 1988 election and collapse ===
The 1988 election campaign was marked by intense mudslinging between the left-wing parties. The PLP criticised Ratz for giving its 'unconditional' support to Shimon Peres's bid to become prime minister, while ignoring the fact that Peres was set to appoint Yitzhak Rabin, who the PLP called 'a minister of blood and gore', as Defense Minister. The PLP criticised Ratz, Hadash, Mapam and Shinui for not assembling a coherent singular force for peace in the Knesset.

During the election campaign, the party continued its bitter rivalry with Hadash, despite the two having very similar platforms. This hostility resulted in physical altercations between the activists of the two parties. In the election the party won only one seat, taken by Miari. Had the two signed a surplus-vote agreement, typical of parties with similar viewpoints, PLP would have retained its second seat.

The NPM supported the Palestinian Declaration of Independence the same year.

The party lost the rest of its Jewish support in 1990 when the NPM supported Saddam Hussein's Iraq in the Gulf War, which finally made the Alternativa leave.

Prior to the 1992 elections the electoral threshold was raised to 1.5%. The PLP won only 0.9% of the vote, losing its Knesset representation. In 1993, conflict broke out within the party over Miari's refusal to work with Hadash, and over his criticism of the Oslo Accords. The last edition of the PLP newspaper, Al-Watan, was published in 1995.

A faction from the PLP joined the National Democratic Assembly (Balad), which contested the 1996 elections on a joint list with Hadash. Another faction, led by Muhammad Zidan, leader of Kafr Manda town council, created the Progressive Confederation, which only received 0.46% of the vote in 1996. The PLP and NPM subsequently disappeared.

== Ideology ==
The party held a six-point programme:

1. Complete equality between Arabs and Jews in the State of Israel.
2. Mutual recognition between the Israeli Jewish and Palestinian Arab peoples of their respective rights to self-determination.
3. Israel's withdrawal from the 1967 occupation of the West Bank and East Jerusalem.
4. Mutual recognition between the State of Israel and the Palestinian state to be established in the occupied territories after the withdrawal of the Israel Defense Forces from them.
5. Recognizing the Palestine Liberation Organization as the sole legitimate representative of the Palestinian people, and negotiating with the organization to achieve peace between the two peoples.
6. Immediate and unconditional withdrawal of Israeli forces from Lebanon.

Comparisons were drawn between the programs of the PLP and Hadash, with multiple scholars calling them 'identical'.

== Legacy ==
In a meeting held in Tel Aviv on April 22, 1994, to mark ten years since the formation of the PLP, the party's former spokesperson Adam Keller stated:

When we formed the Progressive List for Peace, we hoped to create a political force composed of Jews and Arabs together, which would become a permanent feature of the Israeli political scene. Unfortunately, this did not happen. But we did achieve something quite important: to make Israel more of a democracy, by letting its Arab citizens have more of a real exercise of the ballot box... In the Israeli political system as designed under Ben Gurion and continued until 1984, Arab citizens had in practice only two electoral options: either to support one of the satellite parties set up by the ruling Mapai party and completely subservient to it, or to support the Israeli Communist Party which did do quite a bit of good things for the Arabs—but its Secretary General was invariably a Jew. Any group of Arabs which tried to set up a party which was neither government-subservient nor Communist got immediately banned, like Al Ard... Now, though the PLP is gone, its legacy remains. We have irrevocably broken the barrier. Now, just as a Jewish nationalist can form a party and get elected to the Knesset, so can an Arab nationalist. Just as a Jewish religious party can be represented in the Knesset (several of them, in fact) so can an Islamic religious party. You don't have to like all the parties which now can get into the Knesset to appreciate that a basic democratic right can now be exercised.
