= Rela Mazali =

Israeli author and peace activist

- רלה מזלי
- Born: 1948 (age 77–78)

Rela Mazali (Hebrew: רלה מזלי; born 1948) is an Israeli peace activist and writer. She is one of the leading figures in Israel's peace movement.

== Early life and education ==
She was born 1948 in the kibbutz Ma'ayan Baruch in northern Israel. Her mother moved to Israel from Kansas City because of her Zionism. Mazali grew up in Tel Aviv. There she studied philosophy and comparative literature at Tel Aviv University.

== Activism ==
Since 1980, she is an antimilitarist activist against Israel's militarization and military occupation. In 1998, she was one of the co-founders of the feminist movement New Profile, which opposes Israeli militarism and supports conscientious objectors. In 2010 she founded Gun Free Kitchen Tables (GFKT) around disarmament and gun control. She has worked for Physicians for Human Rights–Israel and was a consultant for International Committee of the Red Cross as well as the Ford Foundation.

She wrote books, essays, academic articles and short stories around gender equality, children's rights and peace education.

She was one of 1000 women nominated for the Nobel Peace Prize in 2005 as part of the project 1000 PeaceWomen. A member of Academia for Equality, an organization working to promote democratization, equality and access to higher education for all communities living in Israel.
