= Karim Younis =

Imprisoned for murder of Israeli soldier

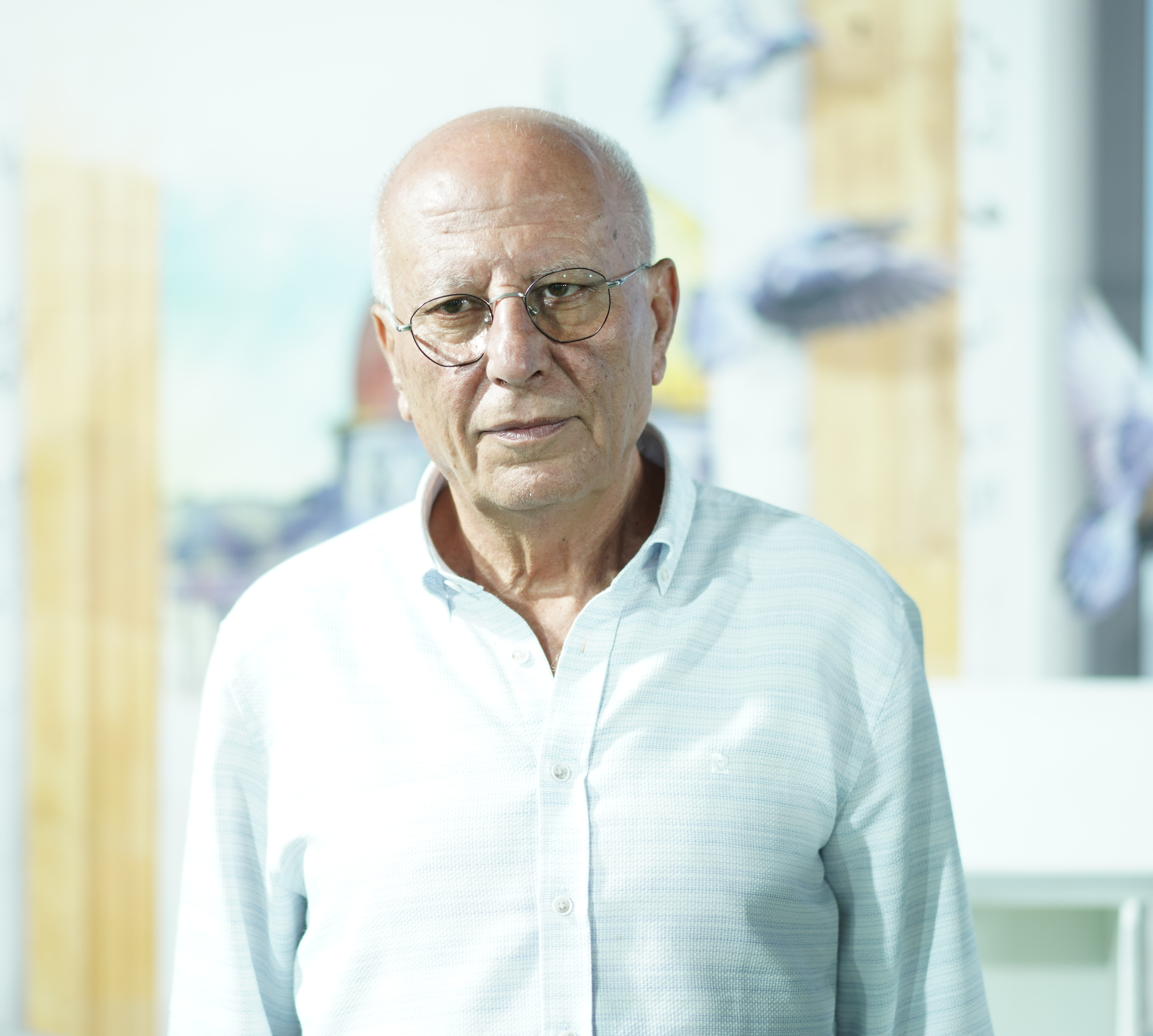

Personal details
- Born: 24 December 1956 (age 69) 'Ara, Haifa District
- Party: Fatah

Karim Youssef Fadl Younis (Arabic: كريم يوسف فضل يونس; born December 24, 1956) is a Palestinian citizen of Israel who served 40 years in Israeli prison after being convicted in 1983 of the 1980 capturing and killing of Israeli soldier Avraham Bromberg. After serving his sentence, he was released in 2023. Younis was the longest-serving Palestinian in Israeli prison.

== Early life and conviction ==
Younis is from 'Ara, a predominantly Arab village in Israel. Younis was arrested by the Israeli army at school on June 1, 1983. He and his cousin Maher Younis were charged with and subsequently convicted of the 1980 capture and killing of Israeli soldier Avraham Bromberg in the occupied Golan Heights.

Karim and Maher were initially sentenced to death by hanging. The sentence was then changed to life in prison, then commuted to 40 years in prison by President of Israel Shimon Peres in 2011.

According to the Palestinian Prisoner's Club, he was one of several Palestinian prisoners that were supposed to be released due to a deal with the courts, but this ended up falling through. Israeli authorities refused to release Younis because he held Israeli citizenship.

== Release ==
Younis was released on 5 January 2023 after serving his sentence. He was dropped off by Israeli police at a bus station in Ra'anana, north of Tel Aviv. His family was not informed of his release or his location, however, he managed to get in contact with them via a passerby. From there, he was taken to 'Ara, where he was greeted with large crowds. At his release, he was considered the longest-serving Palestinian citizen of Israel in Israeli prison. He is considered to have served the longest continuous sentence of any Palestinian.

After Younis's release, Israeli Interior Minister Aryeh Deri called for Younis to be stripped of his Israeli citizenship. Deri's call was supported by Bromberg's nephew.

Younis' cousin Maher was released from Eshel prison near Be'er Sheva on January 19. Maher was the second-longest serving Palestinian prisoner in Israeli prison, as he was arrested later than Karim.
