= Vered Slonim-Nevo =

- ורד סלונים-נבו
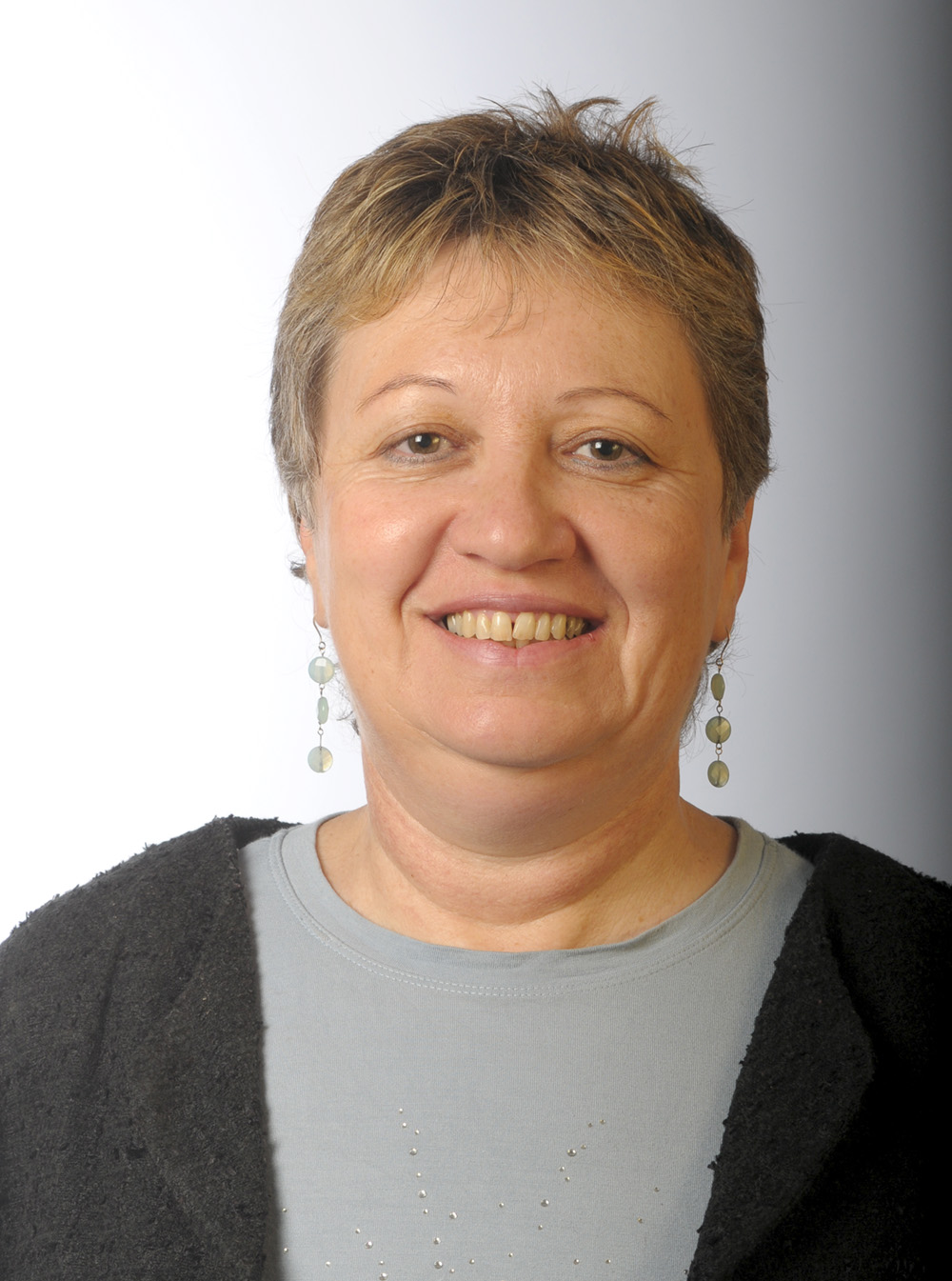
- Born: 1953 (age 72–73); Jerusalem
- Scientific career
- Fields: Social work
- Workplaces: Ben-Gurion University of the Negev
- Website: in.bgu.ac.il/en/humsos/social/Pages/about.aspx/

Vered Slonim-Nevo (Hebrew: ורד סלונים-נבו) is a professor of social work at the Spitzer Department of Social Work in Ben-Gurion University of the Negev (BGU). She studied social work (BSW and MSW) in the Hebrew University of Jerusalem, and PhD in UCLA. In 2004 she received an award from the city of Be'er Sheva for her work. In 2006, Slonim-Nevo was nominated by the Israeli Minister of welfare to review the functioning of social workers who provide child custody reports in divorce hearings, Slonim-Nevo committee.

== Academic career ==
Vered Slonim-Nevo focuses in her work on the connection between theory and practice in the social work profession. As a researcher and a clinician, she devotes her efforts to projects that have a direct impact on the welfare of social work’s clients, and she integrates between theoretical and practical research. Her diverse areas of research are: Youth at risk and AIDS prevention; immigration and refugees; polygamy; treatment evaluation; research methods and interventions that are suitable to the social work profession; children and families living in poverty; forgiveness and forgiveness therapy; and psychological factors related to chronic diseases.

In recent years, Slonim-Nevo and others had focused in their study on the psycho-social factors that affect the medical and emotional well-being of Crohn’s patients.

Teaching, based on clinical experience, is a key element on Slonim-Nevo work. Slonim-Nevo wrote two books about conducting social work interventions that are based on her clinical and research experiences and are used by students and professionals.

Slonim-Nevo’s scientific papers discuss the central dilemmas of the profession: Out-of-home placement of abused children, evidence-based or evidence-informed practice, treatment evaluation, and integrating diverse interventions for the well-being of individuals and families. The populations that she studies are at the center of the activities of the profession: families living in poverty, refugees, and children at risk.

=== Adolescents at risk and AIDS prevention ===
Slonim-Nevo and others studied the factors that are related to engagement in high-risk behaviors among adolescents at risk – in the US, Israel, and Africa. The theoretical research led to the development of interventions to prevent HIV infection and to evaluate their effectiveness.

=== Immigration ===
Slonim-Nevo and others studied the adjustment of adolescents and parents from the former USSR in Israel and in Germany. One of the key finding was the impact of family relations on adjustment: Open and supportive relations were highly influential on adjustment.

=== Polygamy in the Bedouin-Arab society ===
Slonim-Nevo and others studied the impact of this family structure on the psycho-social conditions of children, wives, and husbands living in polygamous families, in a series of quantitative and qualitative studies. We found that family relations is a key factor, together with economic status, explaining the state of children, wives, and husbands.

=== Treatment evaluation ===
Slonim-Nevo published a textbook that is highly used by social work students and researchers for many years. Further, she conducted a study that examined whether the act of evaluation itself affects the results of an intervention. It suggests that conducting an evaluation of an intervention improves its results.

=== Research and intervention methods suitable for social work ===
Together with Isaac Nevo, Slonim-Nevo discussed one of the central questions in the social work profession: Should we teach and practice evidence-based practice, or perhaps promote evidence-informed practice? They wrote a theoretical paper suggesting the latter.

=== Children and families living in poverty ===
Slonim-Nevo and others had published papers attempting to suggest directions to work with children and families living in poverty and in marginalization – interventions that promote the strengths of these families and prevent out-of-home placement in case of child abuse and neglect.

=== Refugees and asylum seekers ===
Slonim-Nevo and others are studying the psychosocial condition of asylum seekers from Darfur in Israel. Quantitative and qualitative results are showing that this troubled group in Israel suffers from PTSD, anxiety, extreme worries about their future. They need legal, social, and clinical care.

== Community work ==
Together with others, Vered applies her findings and perceptions in community work. She is among the founders of “Be’er-Sova”—an NGO that operates in the Negev since 1999. The organization has a direct impact on the lives of hundreds of people in the south of Israel. We serve many citizens living in poverty and provide daily-opened soup kitchen, meals on wheels, legal aid, women’s group, volunteers’ project, and youth center.

In 2015, along with Maya Lavie-Ajayi and Students for Refugees BGU in Israel, she built 8 weeks course in BGU for refugees from Holot's open detention facility.
