= Yesh Gvul =

Movement

Yesh Gvul (Hebrew: יש גבול, can be translated as "There is a limit", as "There is a border", or as "Enough is enough") is an Israeli movement founded in 1982 at the outbreak of the Lebanon War, by combat veterans who refused to serve in Lebanon. Yesh Gvul's campaign of selective refusal is credited with contributing to the Israeli government's decision to withdraw from south Lebanon.

Members of Yesh Gvul have also opposed military service in the Occupied Territories. Their slogan in 2014 was: "We don't shoot, we don't cry, and we don't serve in the occupied territories!"

Members of Yesh Gvul perform military duty on a selective basis, dependent upon the nature and location of service. As such "selective refusal" is a form of "civil disobedience" (modelled on methods pioneered by Mahatma Gandhi in India), the combat veterans are subject to military and civil charges. From 1971 till 1979, the Ministry of Defense pragmatically allowed such selective objectors, when drafted, to serve within the "green line" separating Israel from the occupied territories.

== Changing military policy ==
In the late 20th century, as objectors to military service in certain locations became more numerous, the Israeli military was less willing to provide them with service in alternative assignments: "Army authorities had given objectors a guarantee that they would be stationed according to their wishes, within the borders of Israel, as long as refusal was an isolated phenomenon. Now [1980] policy has changed. What had once been sporadic instances of refusal with which the IDF was prepared to live, has changed in character and become an organized protest whose aim is to turn the IDF - the national army, necessarily disengaged from any political or ideological arguments - into the battleground for a kind of confrontation which the army cannot be associated with." - Proceedings of the Supreme Court, 24 September 1980; cited in Peri (1993).

== 1998 court martial of Adam Keller ==
In an Israeli military court martial of April-May 1998, Reserve Corporal Adam Keller was charged with "Insubordination" and "Spreading of Propaganda Harmful to Military Discipline". While on active military duty, he had written graffiti on 117 tanks and other military vehicles, with the following text: "Soldiers of the IDF, refuse to be occupiers and oppressors, refuse to serve in the occupied territories!" He also had placed stickers on electricity pylons in the military camp where he was serving and inside the stalls in the officers' toilet with the slogan "Down with the occupation!".

Keller was sentenced to three months imprisonment, whereas the maximum penalty was six years, three for each of the charges.

== Methods of support ==
Yesh Gvul has three chief areas of activity: providing personal support (including financial) for each "refusenik"; conducting activities to achieve an end to the occupation; and undertaking a broad campaign of public education for social change within Israeli society. It identifies its main role as "backing soldiers who refuse duties of a repressive or aggressive nature" by giving them both moral and financial assistance.

Over the years, Yesh Gvul have created an effective support system for jailed refuseniks by having human rights groups outside Israel "adopt" them. When Yesh Gvul alerts support groups, a number of activities are begun. These groups send emails, letters and phone calls to the refusenik's family and to the jail where the individual is held, to extend personal support; the adoption group exerts political pressure on Israel by protesting the imprisonment to the nearest Israeli diplomatic mission, while conducting related activities within its own community. The adoption group also customarily offers material assistance, raising funds to help the refusenik's dependants.

Yesh Gvul also engages in direct human rights activities, such as petitioning British courts to issue arrest warrants for IDF officers accused of human rights abuses and war crimes.

Some 3,000 reservists signed a petition delivered to Prime Minister Menachem Begin and Defense Minister Ariel Sharon, protesting service in the occupied territories. Some of them were court martialed and served time in military prison for refusing to obey orders for military service.

Since the beginning of the Second Intifada in 2000, Yesh Gvul has joined a broad coalition of groups that support the right of conscripts to demand alternative humanitarian service, rather than be forced to participate in military service which they oppose.

== See also ==
- Breaking the Silence
- Courage to Refuse (Ometz LeSarev)
- Refusal to serve in the IDF

== Bibliography ==
- Gans, Chaim. (1992) Philosophical Anarchism and Political Disobedience, Cambridge University Press, ISBN 0-521-41450-4
- Hedva, Beth. (2001) Betrayal, Trust, and Forgiveness: A Guide to Emotional Healing and Self-renewal, Celestial Arts, ISBN 1-58761-096-5
- Mudimbe, V Y. (1997) Nations, Identities, Cultures, Duke University Press, ISBN 0-8223-2065-7
- Nunn, Maxine Kaufman. (1993) Creative Resistance: Anecdotes of Nonviolent Action by Israel-based Groups, Alternative Information Center
- Yoram Peri (1993). "Israel: Conscientious Objection in a Democracy under Siege". pp. 146–157. Wikidata Q125141486., ch. 12 in Moskos, Charles Constantine; Chambers, John Whiteclay, eds. (1993). The New Conscientious Objection: From Sacred to Secular Resistance. Oxford University Press. ISBN 978-0-19-774324-9. Wikidata Q125141506.
