= Adam Keller =

Israeli peace activist (born 1955)

- אדם קלר
- Born: 1955 (age 70–71)
- Years active: 1969–present
- Known for: Peace activism
- Political party: Left Camp of Israel, Meri, Progressive List for Peace
- Movement: Gush Shalom, Yesh Gvul
- Parent(s): Hava Keller, Ya'kov Keller

Adam Keller (Hebrew: אדם קלר; born 1955) is an Israeli peace activist who was among the founders of Gush Shalom, of which he is a spokesperson.

== Early and personal life ==
Keller is the son of Ya'akov and Hava Keller (1929–2020). His parents were among the founders of Kibbutz Sa'ar before moving to Tel Aviv in 1953. His mother, a former Haganah fighter who participated in the 1948 Arab–Israeli War, later renounced Zionism and became a pioneering figure in the Israeli radical left. She was a co-founder of several prominent anti-occupation and feminist organizations, including Women in Black, Women for Political Prisoners, and Gush Shalom—the same organization where Adam serves as spokesperson. Adam has noted that his mother's intense dedication to advocating for Palestinian rights, particularly Palestinian prisoners, was driven in part by guilt over her actions during the 1948 war.

Keller's own involvement in left-wing politics began in the summer of 1969, when he was 14 years old. Initially supportive of Israel's territorial expansion following the 1967 Six-Day War, his views began to shift after volunteering at the election headquarters of Uri Avnery's HaOlam HaZeh – Koah Hadash ("New Force") party. Keller was initially drawn to the party due to its anti-establishment stance and advocacy for the separation of religion and state, including the institution of civil marriage. After writing a letter to Avnery questioning the feasibility of peace with the Arabs and the future of the occupied territories, Avnery's detailed response sparked a lifelong mentorship and political partnership between the two.

== Political career and activism ==
=== Partnership with Uri Avnery ===
Over the next 50 years, Keller worked closely alongside Uri Avnery across several successive left-wing political factions. Following his early involvement with HaOlam HaZeh, Keller was active in the Sheli party (Peace and Equality for Israel) and the Israeli Council for Israeli-Palestinian Peace, which facilitated early meetings with the Palestine Liberation Organization (PLO). After the dissolution of Sheli, he served as a spokesperson for the Progressive List for Peace between 1984 and 1988, and eventually became a founding member and spokesperson for Gush Shalom.

Throughout his decades of activism, Keller participated in several highly publicized political actions. In early 1983, he helped distribute photographs to the Israeli press documenting a controversial meeting in Tunisia between Avnery, Matti Peled, Ya'akov Arnon, and PLO Chairman Yasser Arafat. In December 1992 and early 1993, Keller participated in a 45-day protest encampment outside the Prime Minister's Office in Jerusalem to oppose Yitzhak Rabin's deportation of over 400 Palestinian activists to Lebanon. In May 2003, during the Second Intifada, Keller was part of a group of 15 Israeli activists who traveled to the Mukataa in Ramallah to act as human shields outside Yasser Arafat's door, following hints from Prime Minister Ariel Sharon that the IDF might target the Palestinian leader.

=== Military refusal ===
A long-standing supporter of Yesh Gvul, Keller has served several prison terms for refusing reserve military duty in the 1967-occupied territories. In April or May 1988, Reserve Corporal Adam Keller was charged with "insubordination" and "spreading of propaganda harmful to military discipline" in that while on active military duty he had written on 117 tanks and other military vehicles graffiti with the text: "Soldiers of the IDF, refuse to be occupiers and oppressors, refuse to serve in the occupied territories!" as well as placing on electricity pylons in the military camp where he was serving - and on inside doors of the stalls in the officers' toilet - stickers with the slogans "Down with the occupation!".

Keller was convicted and sentenced to three months imprisonment. Keller was an active member of Yesh Gvul, but declared that he had done his act on his own without consulting anybody else. For its part, the movement did not take responsibility for his act, but did provide his wife with the financial support given to the families of refusers.

== Published works ==
Keller is the author of the 1987 book Terrible Days: Social Divisions and Political Paradoxes in Israel. Since 1983, he has served as the editor of The Other Israel, a bimonthly newsletter advocating for Israeli–Palestinian peace. He is also a contributor to the website of the newspaper Zo HaDerekh.

== See also ==
- Arab-Israeli conflict
- List of Middle East peace proposals
