= Young Communist League of Israel =

Communist youth movement in Israel

Young Communist League of Israel ברית הנוער הקומוניסטי הישראלי اتحاد الشبيبة الشيوعية الاسرائيلي
- Secretary General: Adel Amer
- Founded: 1924
- Headquarters: Nazareth, Israel
- Ideology: Communism; Antimilitarism; Anti-Zionism; Environmentalism; Feminism; Internationalism
- Mother party: Maki

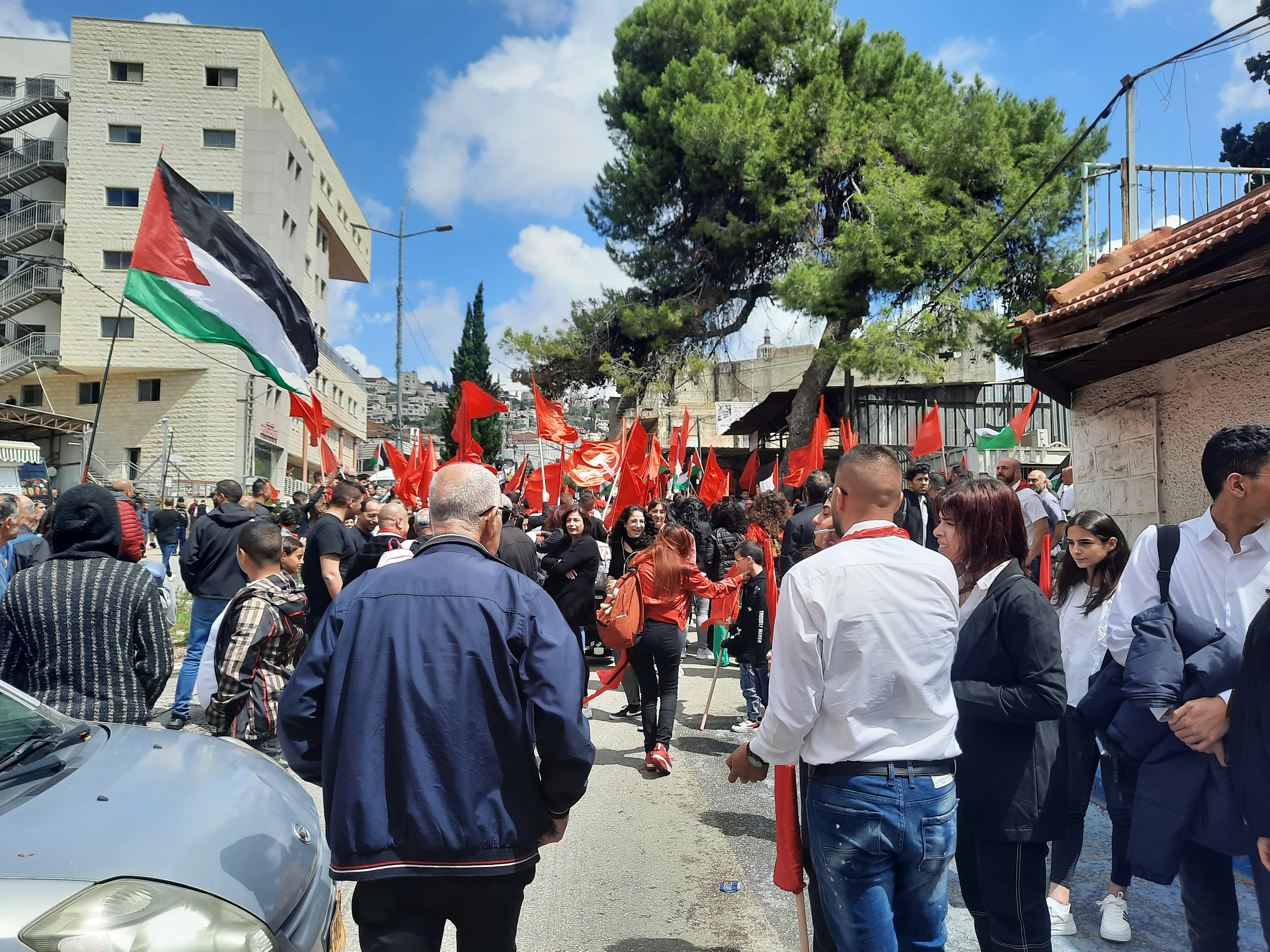
YCLI members in Nazareth, International Workers' Day 2023

The Young Communist League of Israel (Hebrew: ברית הנוער הקומוניסטי הישראלי, romanized: Brit HaNoar HaKomunisti HaYisra'eli; Arabic: اتحاد الشبيبة الشيوعية الاسرائيلي, romanized: Ittihad Alshibayabah Alshiyuaih Alasraili or for short: YCLI, Hebrew: בנק"י, Arabic: ا.ش.ش.ا) is an Israeli communist and anti-Zionist youth movement. YCLI are a part of the Young Communist League (YCL). they serve as the youth wing of the Communist Party of Israel (Maki). YCLI are also a part of the World Federation of Democratic Youth (WFDY) and even participated in its establishment between 1942 and 1945.

Members of the group operate in Nazareth, Tel Aviv, Jerusalem and other cities across the country. They are also a part of the Anti-Occupation Bloc.

== History ==
The movement was established as a resistance movement in April 1924 by young activists aligned with the Palestine Communist Party (PKP). Its primary goal was to establish an organization dedicated to educating and mobilizing communist youth. The movement included both Jewish and Arab members, emphasizing on coexistence and solidarity across ethnic lines.

Unlike other socialist youth movements in Israel at the time, the Young Communist League of Israel never identified as Zionist. The movement viewed Zionism as a nationalistic and colonialist ideology that led to the displacement of the majority of the Palestinian population during what is now known as the Nakba.

Even after Israel's establishment, YCLI remained a communist Jewish-Arab movement advocating for Palestinian right of return, opposing military operations targeting Palestinians, and calling for an end to discrimination between Jews and Arabs. However, internal divisions weakened the movement over time and caused splits.

In 1967, YCLI members opposed the Six-Day War and the Israeli occupation, and they maintain this opposition to this day.

== Repression ==
Before the Israeli Declaration of Independence, the anti-zionist and communist stance of YCLI often led to conflict, particularly with the British authorities, who actively suppressed communist activities in Mandatory Palestine at the time.

In March 1952, two members of the YCLI were arrested for participating in a Maki organized protest.

In 2024, Israel Police raided a building with activists from Hadash, Maki, and YCLI, who prepared a march for May Day. At least two activists were arrested. In June of that year, the secretary of the YCLI's Acre district was arrested while preparing for a protest in Sakhnin against the war in Gaza, which was scheduled for the following day.

In July 2025, the Modi'in-Maccabim-Reut municipality attempted to impose a fee on YCLI activists for an information stall. The Association for Civil Rights in Israel intervened to block the charge, characterizing it as unlawful and without legal basis, noting that municipal bylaws only authorized fees for commercial enterprises, not political non-profits.

=== Conscientious objection ===
In December 2013, Omar Sa'ad, a member of YCLI, was imprisoned for refusing to enlist to the Israel Defense Forces.

In February 2016, Roman Levine, member of YCLI, was imprisoned for refusing to enlist into the IDF.

In February 2018, Saar Yahalom, a leading member of the YCLI in Tel Aviv was imprisoned for refusing to enlist in the army.

In November 2024, Iddo Elam, a member of YCLI, was imprisoned for refusing to enlist into the IDF.

In March 2025, Ella Keidar Greenberg, another member of the movement, was sentenced to an initial 30 days in Israeli military prison for refusing to enlist to the army.

== Traditions ==
YCLI's symbol features the hammer and sickle, a well-known communist emblem representing the solidarity of the proletariat. It also incorporates the red star associated with the communist ideology.

The movement shirt is a white button-up shirt adorned with a red triangular tie. It was traditionally worn by members during special events such as the May Day, Victory in Europe Day marking the defeat of the Nazis, as well as at YCLI and Maki conferences, among others. Similar movement shirts are a common feature in most communist youth organizations.
