= Refusal to serve in the Israel Defense Forces =

Conscientious objection in Israel

Citizens of Israel have refused to serve in the Israel Defense Forces (IDF) or have disobeyed orders on the grounds of pacifism, antimilitarism, religious philosophy, or political disagreement with Israeli policy such as its occupation of the West Bank. Conscientious objectors in Israel are known as sarvanim (in Hebrew סרבנים) which is sometimes translated as "refuseniks", or mishtamtim (evaders, dodgers).

== Aspects ==
=== Causes ===
Some distinguish between refusal to serve in the military because of a pacifist worldview that rejects any manifestation of violence and encompasses a refusal to submit to compulsory military service in any form, and partial refusal to serve, such as the Ometz Le'sarev (Courage to Refuse) group who "do their reserve duty wherever and whenever they are summoned, but refuse to serve in the occupied territories." The diverse range of opinions regarding the refusal to serve is the reason why there is no single umbrella organization that encompasses all groups of refusers. While most instances of refusal to serve have historically been found among left-leaning Israelis, there is a rapidly expanding willingness among right-wing soldiers to refuse orders to evict Jews from settlements in the West Bank (and formerly in the Gaza Strip).

=== Religious exemption ===
Since the founding of the State of Israel in 1948, Haredi Jews have refused to serve in the Israeli military for religious reasons. Typically, they study Torah in Yeshivas, and as such are legally exempt from military service. Also refusing any Israeli military service are people affiliated with various Hasidic anti-Zionist groups (most notably Satmar), the Brisk Yeshivas, and the Neturei Karta. Most of these groups are followers of the Edah HaCharedis. Haredi Jews who avoid military service yet are only part-time yeshiva students, have received criticism from within the Orthodox community.

=== Draft evasion among celebrities ===
Some Israeli celebrities have evaded military service national service to further their careers. A 2007 incident that garnered international headlines focused on revelations in the press that Israeli Sports Illustrated Swimsuit Issue cover model Bar Refaeli had married a family friend in 2004 and divorced him soon after in order to avoid military service. Refaeli received widespread criticism, including from the Israeli Forum for the Promotion of Equal Share, to which she responded, "I really wanted to serve in the IDF, but I don't regret not enlisting, because it paid off big time. That's just the way it is, celebrities have other needs. I hope my case has influenced the army." In a compromise to avoid potential boycotts of companies Refaeli works with, she agreed to visit injured IDF soldiers on visits to Israel and encourage enlistment in the army. The incident made headlines again in October 2009 when fellow Israeli model Esti Ginzburg criticized Refaeli in an interview with Israeli newspaper Yedioth Ahronoth, reigniting arguments over the ease with which conscription can be dodged.

=== Response to draft evasion ===
Almost all the political factions in Israel have condemned refusal to serve on ideological grounds, using terms such as dangerous and undemocratic. The conscientious objectors, or refuseniks as they call themselves, found support within left-wing and the Arab parties, Hadash, Balad, Raam and parts of Meretz (Zehava Galon, Roman Bronfman and Shulamit Aloni). The Israeli Labor Party and other Meretz members have condemned the refuseniks and said that although their protests against the occupation are justified and understandable, the means they are taking to manifest it are wrong. Some major left-wing politicians expressed the fear that left-oriented refusal to serve in the territories will lend legitimacy to right-oriented refusal to remove settlements. Right wing politicians have claimed that the refuseniks' actions are helping the enemies of Israel in their anti-Israeli incitement. Some have even accused the refuseniks of treason during wartime. This viewpoint was given some support when the book The Seventh War, by Avi Yisacharov and Amos Harel was published in 2004; it contains extensive interviews with Hamas leaders, at least one of whom explicitly stated that the actions of the commandos' and pilots' letters encouraged to promote and continue the use of suicide bombers.

The Israeli High Court of Justice ruled in 2002 that refusal to serve was legal on the grounds of unqualified pacifism, but "selective refusal" which accepted some duties and not others was illegal. The court said that allowing selective refusal would "weaken the ties that bind us as a nation". The court also said that the refusal to serve in the territories is selective refusal and not conscientious objection.

From 1998 to 2000, 9.5% of applicants who filed for an exemption from service for conscientious reasons were granted it.

On January 4, 2004, a military tribunal imposed one-year prison terms on five young activists who refused to enlist in the IDF. The court accepted that the five acted in accordance with their conscience but "ruled that they did not refuse to serve as individuals, but rather as a group, with the explicit goal of bringing about a change in Israeli policy in the territories. As such, the court ruled, their action strayed from the norms of classic conscientious objection into the realm of civil disobedience" (Haaretz).

== History ==
=== Origins ===
In Mandatory Palestine during World War II, when many military-age Jews from the Yishuv were joining the British military, a few conscientious objectors refused, and wrote to the headquarters of War Resisters' International in London about the social pressure they faced. A Palestine branch of War Resisters' International was founded in 1946 by one such conscientious objector, David Engel, who in 1943 had been expelled from Kfar Ruppin for refusing to enlist in the British Army. He reported that his group initially had about 40 members. In 1948, the year of Israel's declaration of independence, another member of the group, Joseph Abileah, was the first conscientious objector to be put on trial before a military court for refusing to serve in the IDF. He was excused from service in the army on the grounds of ill health, which according to him was a face-saving measure. A 1954 report in Haaretz judged the size of the group to be about 100. The group's greatest failure was to not have conscientious objection recognised in law. In general, persons who made their objections known before being called up were treated more leniently than those to objected after receiving their call-up notice. Members of the group held a variety of political opinions beside their common pacifism; while some were anti-Zionist most were not.

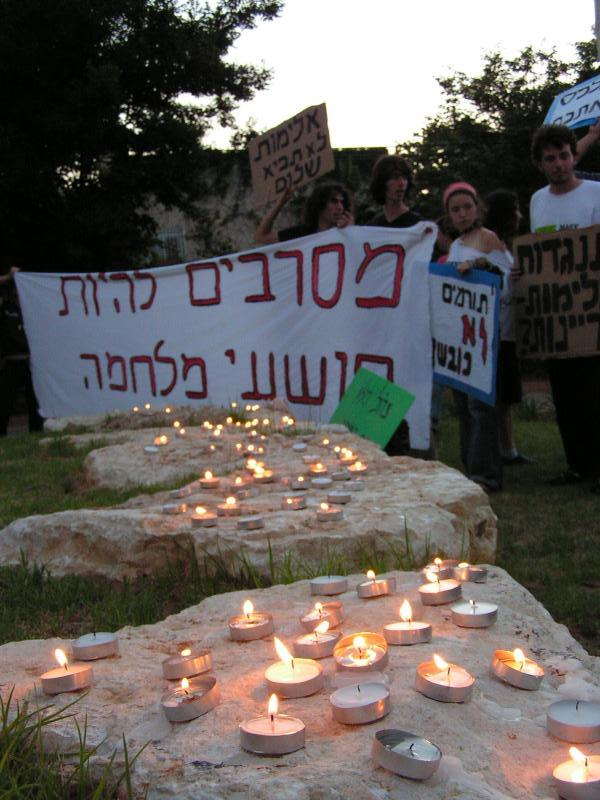
Israeli refusniks at a demonstration

Although Israel has mandatory conscription, some Israelis do not serve in the military. Israeli Arabs are not drafted, though they may enlist, and increasing numbers serve voluntarily including at very senior level. Haredi conscription was also not mandatory for several decades based on arrangements with the Haredi community, where Haredim who dedicate full time for Torah study would be exempt from military service. Many people who are "unfit" or "unqualified", either mentally or physically, are also exempt. Military service can often be postponed for further education—either college or university, or technical studies. Finally, a number of people refuse to serve because of pacifist views, because they believe the IDF is not an army of defense, or refuse certain orders based on their disagreement with government policy.

In February 2004, Israeli Chief of Personnel Major-General Gil Regev told a Knesset committee that the number of soldiers refusing to serve in the territories had dramatically decreased in 2003 despite the increase in the number of high-profile refusals. He said that eighteen reserve soldiers and eight officers had been imprisoned for refusal in 2003 compared to 100 reservists and 29 officers in 2002, a decrease of 80%. Members of the refusers' organization Yesh Gvul claimed in reply that actually 76 people, including eleven officers, had been jailed for refusal in 2003. They also said that 79 soldiers and eighteen officers had added their names to the Courage to Refuse letter in 2003, and that the number of high-school refuseniks had risen to 500.

The first well-known instance of an individual refusing to serve in the IDF occurred in 1954 when Amnon Zichroni, a lawyer, asked to be released from military service as a pacifist. Initially, then Minister of Defense Pinhas Lavon refused to release Zichroni, though he was eventually discharged from the army reserves.

=== Shministim movement ===
On April 28, 1970, a group of high school seniors about to be drafted sent a letter to Prime Minister Golda Meir expressing their reservation about the occupation of the West Bank and Gaza, the War of Attrition and the government's failure to take steps to avoid conflict. In 1987, a new group was formed, also made up of high school students intent on refusing to serve in the Occupied Territories. They gave themselves the name that the press used to dub the previous effort – 'Shministim' (Hebrew: שמיניסטים, lit. 'twelfth graders'"). In 2001, a high-school refusers movement – also called Shministim followed in their stead. Over 3,000 Israeli high school students are currently members of Shministim.. A smaller number of them have also signed a public letter in which they state their intent to refuse any service in the army. Such a behaviour has usually resulted in repeated jail sentences of several weeks. One of the most prominent Shiministim that went to jail is Omer Goldman. Her case received special attention since her father used to be one of the highest ranking Mossad officers.

On December 18, 2008, a worldwide campaign was launched in order to request the freedom of Shministim, including the delivery of more than forty thousand letters, to Israeli embassies, appealing for her cause.

=== Yesh Gvul movement ===
Yesh Gvul (Hebrew: יש גבול, can be translated as "there is a limit" or "the border exists") is a movement founded in 1982 at the outbreak of the Lebanon War by reservists who refused to serve in Lebanon. A petition, delivered to Prime Minister Menachem Begin and Defense Minister Ariel Sharon was signed by 3,000 reservists, some of whom were court martialed and served time in military prison for refusing to obey orders. Currently, it sees its main role as "backing soldiers who refuse duties of a repressive or aggressive nature." It also engages in human rights activities, such as petitioning British courts to issue arrest warrants for IDF officers accused of human rights abuses and war crimes.

In the Adam Keller Court Martial in April–May 1988, Reserve Corporal Adam Keller was charged with insubordination and spreading propaganda harmful to military discipline. While on active military duty he had written on 117 tanks and other military vehicles graffiti with the text: "Soldiers of the IDF, refuse to be occupiers and oppressors, refuse to serve in the occupied territories!" as well as placing on electricity pylons in the military camp where he was serving—and on inside doors of the stalls in the officers' toilet—stickers with the slogans "Down with the occupation!". Keller was sentenced to three months imprisonment although the maximum penalty could have been six years, three for each of the charges. Keller was an active member of Yesh Gvul, but declared that he had operated on his own. For its part, the movement did not take responsibility for his act, but did provide his wife with the monetary support given to the families of refusers.

=== Courage to Refuse group ===
In January 2002, 51 reserve soldiers and officers signed a "Combat Troops' Letter" or "Combatants' Letter" in which they declared their refusal "to fight beyond the 1967 borders in order to dominate, expel, starve and humiliate an entire people." They established the group, Ometz LeSarev, which distinguishes itself by using conspicuously Zionist discourse: "Refusal to serve in the Territories is Zionism." 633 combatants from all units of the IDF and from all sectors of the Israeli society have since signed the letter.

=== Pilots' letter incident ===
"The pilots' letter," published on September 24, 2003, was signed by 27 reserve and active duty pilots. One of the signatories was the famous pilot Brigadier General (res.) Yiftah Spector. The letter was precipitated by the targeted killing of Salah Shehade, leader of Hamas's militant wing, who was killed, along with 14 others, by a one-ton bomb dropped on his residential building. Pilots decried the large number of civilian casualties caused by Israel's targeted killings as violating the military's ethics code. In their letter, the pilots stated:

We, veteran and active pilots alike, who served and still serve the state of Israel for long weeks every year, are opposed to carrying out attack orders that are illegal and immoral of the type the state of Israel has been conducting in the territories. We, who were raised to love the state of Israel and contribute to the Zionist enterprise, refuse to take part in Air Force attacks on civilian population centers. We, for whom the Israel Defense Forces and the Air Force are an inalienable part of ourselves, refuse to continue to harm innocent civilians. These actions are illegal and immoral, and are a direct result of the ongoing occupation which is corrupting all of Israeli society. Perpetuation of the occupation is fatally harming the security of the state of Israel and its moral strength.

The signatories clarified that they do not reject military service in the IDF, only targeted killings of individuals, declaring: "We ... shall continue to serve in the Israel Defense Forces and the Air Force for every mission in defense of the state of Israel."

In response, the Chief of Staff announced that the pilots would be grounded and will no longer be allowed to train cadets in the country's flight school. In response to their letter, hundreds of IAF pilots signed a petition denouncing the pilots' letter and their refusal to serve. Because of the harsh response, several of the pilots who originally signed the letter reneged and removed their signatures; after more than 30 signed, four later recanted. One, an El Al pilot, was threatened with dismissal and another lost his civilian job.

=== Commandos' letter incident ===
This letter, dated December 2003, was signed by 13 reservists of Sayeret Matkal, an elite commando unit, serving in the West Bank and Gaza Strip (nine commandos in Sayeret Matkal, two soldiers who had been removed from reserve duty because of prior refusals to serve there, and two additional combatant soldiers). Their letter, addressed to Prime Minister Ariel Sharon, stated:

We shall no longer lend a hand in the occupation of the territories. We shall no longer take part in the deprivation of basic human rights from millions of Palestinians. We shall no longer serve as a shield in the crusade of the settlements. We shall no longer corrupt our moral character in missions of oppression. We shall no longer deny our responsibility as soldiers of the Israeli DEFENSE force.

=== September 2014 Unit 8200 letter ===
In what The New York Times called, "the first public collective refusal by intelligence officers rather than combat troops" to serve, on September 12, 43 veteran reserve army mid-ranking officers and soldiers (33 soldiers and 10 officers, including a major and two captains, mostly in their late 20s and 30s) in the IDF's top intelligence electronic surveillance corps, Unit 8200, Israel's equivalent to the NSA, published a letter in Israel's most widely read newspaper, Yedioth Ahronoth, directed to Prime Minister Benjamin Netanyahu, the IDF Chief of Staff Benny Gantz, Moshe Ya'alon and Aviv Kochavi, the head of Military Intelligence, in which they registered their refusal to participate, on the grounds of conscience, in any action designed to "harm the Palestinian population in the West Bank." It took roughly a year to gather all of the signatures, and its publication was delayed by the war in Gaza until hostilities ceased in order not to be seen as attacking the army in wartime. According to the highest-ranking signatory, many other members of Unit 8200 support their stand, but did not add their names for fear of reactions and the personal price their involvement would exact. Ten of the 43 belonged to the "circle of control" in the unit.

The 43 decried the use of espionage to set up airstrikes that have inflicted casualties among civilians. The letter, originally written before the recent 2014 Israel–Gaza conflict, was initially reported to be unrelated to it, but does mention "the collective punishment of residents in Gaza", that war being, according to one of the group, "just another chapter in this cycle of violence", and calls on the Israeli public to speak up against injustices. While the incidents they allude to have no relation to Operation Protective Edge, in which none participated, several avoided service during the 2014 war in Gaza by refusing to answer a call to do reserve duty, employing a variety of excuses. In the light of that war, the refuseniks said they would refuse to enlist if called upon to serve in the reserve, and none had served during the July–August Gaza war.

In their view, espionage that probed for information of sexual preferences or health problems that might prove useful in turning people into informants for Israel, invaded the privacy of a people under occupation, sought to exercise control over innocent Palestinian civilians, turn people into collaborators and stir divisiveness and dissension among Palestinians in the West Bank. One of the undersigned said that, while affirming their commitment to continue gathering intelligence on enemy states, they found themselves morally obliged not engage in intelligence gathering whose "main objective is to maintain the military rule in the West Bank". The soldiers also alleged that cases existed where IDF intelligence hindered just trials for defendants, from whom evidence in the prosecution's hands was withheld, in military courts. According to the undersigned trainees for the unit are led to believe that there is no such thing as a clearly illegal order within Unit 8200.

Shortly after, 200 other reservists signed a counter protest stating:

We are veterans of Unit 8200, soldiers and reserve soldiers, past and present, who wish to express shock, disgust and total renouncement of the letter written by our fellow soldiers, who chose political refusal over our unit,...We regret that our friends make cynical use of politics in their legal and moral duty to serve in the reserve unit, which in our eyes constitutes the highest honor, and seek [instead] to undermine the activities and achievements in the unit's defense of the country and its people.

Defense Minister Moshe Ya'alon criticized the letter by saying "I know Unit 8200 from my time as head of Military Intelligence and know the massive extent which their efforts play in Israel's security. They soldiers and officers there are doing God's work, night and day. 8200 preserves Israel's existence. The attempt to harm it and its work, through calls to refuse to report for duty, based on claims that are incongruent with the unit's ways and the values of its soldiers, is a base and distasteful attempt to aid the hateful and dishonest anti-legitimization campaign being led around the world against Israel and the IDF." Opposition leader and head of the Labor Party Isaac Herzog, who served as a major in the 8200 unit, also hailed its work and said he was opposed to, and repulsed by, so-called "conscientious objectors." He said that "this unit and its activities are essential not just in time of war, but especially in times of peace," adding that he believed the way in which the members went about voicing their objections was harmful and that Israeli citizens would ultimately pay the price. Knesset Speaker Yuli Edelstein said that the signatories had "done a great service to haters of Israel. This is a clear political statement against the IDF and published just as harsh criticisms with no basis or understanding of our situation are being thrown at us." Labor MK Shelly Yachimovich called them "cowards."

One refusnik said his decision arose from a gradual realization that he was engaged in the kind of work that usually makes people shudder and is associated with what intelligence services do in non-democratic regimes. A captain in the group stated that a good deal of what the IDF is not about 'defense', but consists in military rule over another people in the Occupied Palestinian territories. A further witness said that Palestinians lacked 'legal protections from harassment, extortion and injury.' One testified that "any information that might enable extortion of an individual is considered relevant information". A captain said his outlook was changed after viewing The Lives of Others, dealing with the way the East German Stasi unit pried into the private lives of citizens. Another said a turning point occurred when he watched at the unit's headquarters as a figure in an orchard was blown up in an airstrike, and, when the smoke cleared they could see his mother running to the body of what was evidently then just a small boy. Another officer spoke of an incident at the outset of Operation Cast Lead where 89 young policeman at their graduation ceremony were killed in a bomb strike, which he complained to his superior was both "morally unsound and problematic", time being lost killing police on parade instead of attacking rocket sites and arsenals. His remark was passed on, but no reply received. The witness also mentioned the targeted assassination of Nizar Rayan, which killed 18 members of his family, and successive attempts to kill Hamas leaders. In the operational room disappointment was expressed not at civilians being killed arbitrarily, but that they had missed their targets. The source further asserted that Israel let people requiring medical treatment die unless they were forthcoming about a relative who was on the wanted list. Another incident related concerns an operation where it was surmised that a person on their wanted list appeared to be standing by a weapons warehouse in Gaza, the time and location suggested it would be him, and he was assassinated. The victim turned out to be a child. Another witness said that booty taken during arrest operations was stacked in a storeroom, photos, flags, weapon parts, books, Qurans, jewellery, and soldiers were told they could take whatever they liked out of this Palestinian memorabilia, the idea being to 'poison the students'.

Testimonies concerning specific incidents were also listed in the letter, which, IDF spokesman Michael Lerner said, would be examined. One particular allegation, made by a captain, was that during the Al-Aqsa Intifada, in 2003, the IDF routinely bombed buildings at night as a response to terrorist attacks. On the occasion of the Neve Shaanan Street bombing by Islamic Jihad, a harsher response was decided on, involving the bombing of a Fatah building, though Fatah was known to be unconnected to the terroristic incident. In addition that Fatah target had no military function, but was a welfare centre where paychecks were doled out. Breaking precedent with the past, the operation was designed to hit the building, not when it was empty, but when people were inside to ensure that deaths would occur. Signalling that people were inside the building would give a green light for executing the bombing. In what became known as the Lieutenant A. Affair, a lieutenant of the unit refused on principle to give the green light for the attack. The media misrepresented the proposed action as a targeted killing. The officer was described within the unit as 'confused'—he was kicked out of his job, and given administrative duties and the message was that there was no such thing as an illegal order in that unit. One of the 43 said he had access to the inquiry, and that it was faked, making out that the lieutenant had been ordered to ensure the targeted building was empty, which, he stated, was the opposite of the truth. Another interviewee contrasted the huge outcry caused by the 14 collateral civilian casualties in the targeted assassination of Salah Shehade in 2002 with the insouciance that met the continual bombing of buildings, with hundreds of innocent deaths, during the summer conflict with Gaza. One refusnik's father had suffered at the hands of Argentina's military junta under its Dirty War and drew a comparison, which he said was only partial, between intelligence gathering for the army and its consequences there, and what Palestinians can face under Israeli military rule. A number of signatories expressed regret for their collaboration in providing input for airstrikes prior to the 2014 Israel-Gaza conflict that, while targeting Hamas military commanders, also killed innocent bystanders. Working in Unit 8200 is a 'coveted pipeline' to career advancement in Israeli's high-technology industries.

The gesture has been interpreted as "an unprecedented rebuke to Prime Minister Benjamin Netanyahu's security policies." Three signatories clarified that the letter was not just related to the recent Israel–Gaza conflict, but referred to the 'normal' circumstances of Israel's occupation. The letter, according to Elior Levy, has tapped into wider concerns regarding the ethics of state surveillance, in the wake of Edward Snowden's NSA leaks.

The IDF dismissed the letter as a "publicity stunt by a small fringe", and a defense spokesman stated that those who work for Unit 8200 personnel were required to observe ethical standards "without rival in the intelligence community in Israel or the world", and that the group's going public when internal mechanisms existed to handle complaints undermined the seriousness of their assertions. All 43 are expected to be dishonorably discharged from the IDF.

Former head of 8200, Brigadier General Hanan Gefen, commented:

If I was the unit's commander I would have terminated their [protesters] service, court-marshalled them, and ask for severe punishment. They used confidential information, which they privy to during their service, to promote their political agenda.

An IDF spokesperson said that the 43 would be severely disciplined and that there was no place for refusal in the IDF.

Over 200 other reservists in the Unit denounced the letter as shameful, and that they had revealed matters taking place within a top secret unit for political reasons. Everything there is done, they aver, in conformity with international and IDF ethics.

In an op-ed, Gideon Levy praised the 'courage' and ethics of an elite group which, he claimed, when interviewed on radio and television, was dismissed by commentators in unison with descriptive language ranging from "trippy," "scandalous," "negligible," to "spoiled brats," "politicos" and "lefties".

=== 2023 "Youth Against Dictatorship" letter ===
In September 2023, over 200 Israeli youth released an open letter entitled Youth Against Dictatorship announcing that they would refuse to serve.

On December 26, 2023, Israeli teen Tal Mitnick was sentenced to 30 days in jail for refusing the draft, refusing to participate in the Gaza war, which he condemned as "a revenge campaign... not only against Hamas, but against all Palestinian people." Mitnick's comments about his actions were shared by Mesarvot, which is one of several support groups for conscientious objectors to the IDF or refuseniks. In February 2024, Sofia Orr was also jailed for refusing to serve in the IDF, explaining that she had made the decision when she was 15 because "if I enlisted, I would be taking part in and normalizing a decades-long cycle of violence". Another war refuser, Ariel Davidod, declared his refusal to serve in October 2023 but was not jailed.

=== November 2024 Ultra-Orthodox arrest warrants ===
In mid November 2024 it was announced that Israeli military officials had issued 1,126 arrest warrants for ultra-Orthodox Jewish conscripts who had not responded to drafting orders. Brigadier General Shay Tayeb who announced the warrants also stated that those who continued to not cooperate would be summed immediately or declared a draft dodger and banned from foreign travel and risk of arrest. The warrants come after a June 2024 ruling by the Israeli Supreme Court stating that the government must enlist draft-aged ultra-Orthodox Jews into the military, who had been previously exempt in order to study the Torah. The ruling had caused officials in the ultra-Orthodox Shas party to urge potential conscripts in July 2024 to ignore any call-ups from the IDF and protests which at least one resulted in protestors attacking both law enforcement and the vehicle of Minister Yitzhak Goldknopf.

=== 2025 reservist non-attendance ===
In early 2025, multiple Israeli news outlets reported that a significant number of reservists, according to some estimates over 100,000, had ceased to report for duty following the collapse of the January 2025 Gaza war ceasefire. Refuser leader Ishai Menuchin stated that if the figures are accurate, "it means the government will have a problem continuing the war." +972 Magazine reports that while many reservists are facing an accumulating loss of income since October 2023, and that most "have no real ideological objection to the war but rather have grown demoralized, weary, or fed up that it is dragging on for so long", others have ethical objections to the war. Unlike conscripts, punishment for reservist non-attendance is less likely; Menuchin stated he was only made aware of one case and the reservist received a much more lenient sentence than younger refusers.

== See also ==
- Combatants for Peace
- Israeli peace camp
- Sayeret Matkal
- Breaking the Silence
- Mesarvot
- Non-recruitment in Israel
- Yesh Gvul
