= Bernie Kaminetsky =

American pro-Israel lobbyist

- Born: Bernard Kaminetsky
- Spouse: Melanie Renchner

Bernard "Bernie" Kaminetsky is an American physician and president of the American Israel Public Affairs Committee (AIPAC) since 2024.

== Early life and education ==
Kaminetsky attended Yeshiva University and the Albert Einstein College of Medicine.

== Career ==
=== AIPAC ===
In 2024, Kaminetsky and Michael Tuchin visited Baku, Azerbaijan for meetings with President of Azerbaijan Ilham Aliyev.

Kaminestky succeeded Michael Tuchin as AIPAC president in 2024.

In September 2025, The Jerusalem Post listed Kaminetsky and AIPAC CEO Elliot Brandt as 43rd on their annual list of the 50 Most Influential Jews.

In November 2025, Brandt, Tuchin, and Kaminetsky led an AIPAC delegation of major donors to Taiwan, Japan and South Korea.
