= The Washington Institute for Near East Policy =

Pro-Israel American think tank in Washington D.C.

- Formation: 1985; 41 years ago
- Type: 501(c)(3) organization
- Tax ID no.: 52-1376034
- Headquarters: Washington, D.C., U.S.
- Coordinates: 38.9037°N 77.043°W
- Executive Director: Robert Satloff
- Revenue: $24.4 million (2023)
- Expenses: $17.8 million (2023)
- Website: www.washingtoninstitute.org

The Washington Institute for Near East Policy (WINEP), also known simply as The Washington Institute (TWI), is an American pro-Israel think tank based in Washington, D.C., focused on the foreign policy of the United States in the Near East.

WINEP was established in 1985 with the support of the American Israel Public Affairs Committee (AIPAC) and the funding of many AIPAC donors, in order to provide higher quality research than AIPAC's own publications. John Mearsheimer and Stephen Walt described WINEP as "part of the core" of the Israel lobby in the United States. M. J. Rosenberg, who worked at AIPAC during the time WINEP was founded, has described the think tank as an AIPAC-controlled "cutout" of the lobbying group.

== Background ==
WINEP was founded in 1985 by Barbi Weinberg, a former president of the Jewish Federation in Los Angeles and the wife of former AIPAC president Larry Weinberg, along with Martin Indyk, an Australian-American academic and then-Deputy Director of Research for AIPAC. Indyk was the first executive director. WINEP was created "with the blessing of AIPAC" and funded by many AIPAC donors. Indyk said of the think tank, "The image that I would like to convey is that we are friendly to Israel but doing credible research on the Middle East in a realistic and balanced way." The Institute's research was designed to be more independent and of academic-quality than was being produced by AIPAC. At the time it was founded, the Institute's research focused on Arab–Israeli relations, political and security issues, and overall U.S. Middle East policy.

In the 1990s, prompted by the collapse of the Soviet Union, the Persian Gulf War, and changes in regional strategy, the Institute expanded its research agenda to "focus on Turkey and the rise of Islamic politics." It was during the Gulf War that the Institute gained public recognition as a source for commentary and analysis. By 1992, it had a staff of 12–15 in-house research fellows, in addition to visiting scholars and support staff. Under Indyk's leadership, the institute gained notability as a center for the study and discussion of Middle East policy, and attracted Arab intellectuals to its events. Indyk would go on to serve in several U.S. diplomatic posts including as U.S. ambassador to Israel, special envoy for Israeli–Palestinian negotiations, special assistant to the president and senior director for Near East and South Asian affairs at the National Security Council, and assistant secretary of state for Near Eastern affairs. Indyk was also president and director of the Foreign Policy Program at the Brookings Institution.

In addition to ongoing research, WINEP has provided in-depth analysis at key inflection points in Middle East policy, such as during presidential election years. Beginning in 1988, the institute convened bipartisan Presidential Study Groups that have offered policy papers for incoming administrations of either party. The inaugural PSG document informed the policy of the George H. W. Bush administration toward the Middle East peace process. The institute has earned a reputation for solid scholarship, is committed to the peace process, and is a "staunch supporter of Israel" — a relationship with which it believes advances U.S. security interests. It has bipartisan support in the US, though it is closer ideologically to the Democratic Party and generally opposes neoconservative policy.

After the takeover of areas of Iraq by the Sunni militant group Daesh (ISIL) in 2014, The New York Times reported that Institute Lafer Fellow Michael Knights had alerted the U.S. National Security Council as early as 2012 to the rising level of insurgency among Iraq's Sunni minority. White House officials questioned his statistics and did not take action.

The institute has been a forum for the discussion of key issues in U.S. policy toward Saudi Arabia. In May 2016, it hosted the former Saudi intelligence chief, Prince Turki bin Faisal al Saud, alongside Israeli Defense Forces Maj. Gen. (res.) Yaakov Amidror, a former national security adviser to Prime Minister Benjamin Netanyahu, in a rare joint public appearance. Two years later, Dr. Mohammad Al-Issa, secretary-general of the Muslim World League, addressed the Institute and advocated a more moderate and tolerant Islam. Dissident Saudi journalist Jamal Khashoggi participated in an Institute forum in November 2016 in which he stated that Saudi Arabia should be "rightfully nervous about the Trump presidency," according to The Economist.

== Activities ==
The Washington Institute accesses the policy process from many angles: the written word, the spoken word, and personal contact. Institute experts research the region and brief officials in all branches of the U.S. government, both civilian and military. In addition to producing printed long-form monographs, the institute issues time-sensitive policy briefs which are distributed electronically by e-mail and social media. A 2014 Chicago Tribune editorial declared that Institute-sponsored polls bring to light trends in popular thinking across the Middle East.

While the institute frequently hosts off-the-record events with policymakers and scholars, its policy forums are public events featuring newsmakers and analysts that are attended by officials and journalists and are broadcast live on-line. The Institute also holds an annual policy conference that convenes policymakers, journalists, and diplomats in Washington, D.C., for in-depth discussion and debate on the key Middle East issues facing the United States.

Institute scholars are public intellectuals who share their analysis frequently in major print and broadcast outlets. All institute output is available through its website in both English and Arabic.

In addition to its permanent resident fellows—a group of experienced policymakers from government and academia—the institute also hosts visiting fellows from around the world. Visiting fellows include both young people beginning their foreign policy careers and veterans who want to take advantage of a year in Washington, D.C. to study the Middle East from an American vantage point. In cooperation with the Army, Navy, Air Force, and State Department, WINEP offers one-year fellowships that enable rising officers to immerse themselves in the geopolitics of the Middle East and the process of Washington policymaking. The Institute also supports a program for research assistants and interns that provides foreign policy experience for undergraduates and recent college graduates.

The Institute's Scholar-Statesman Award honors individuals "whose public service and professional achievements exemplify sound scholarship and a discerning knowledge of history." Recipients have included former U.S. President Bill Clinton, former British Prime Minister Tony Blair, former U.S. Secretary of State Condoleezza Rice, and former CIA directors Michael Hayden and George Tenet.

== Reception ==
M.J. Rosenberg criticized the organization on Al Jazeera for having strong ties to the pro-Israel lobbying group AIPAC and for being founded by a former AIPAC employee.

In a December 2003 interview on Al Jazeera, Rashid Khalidi, a Palestinian-American professor and director of Columbia University's Middle East Institute, sharply criticized WINEP, stating that it is "the fiercest of the enemies of the Arabs and the Muslims", and describing it as the "most important Zionist propaganda tool in the United States." In response, Martin Kramer, the editor of the Middle East Quarterly and a visiting fellow at WINEP, defended the group, saying that it is "run by Americans, and accepts funds only from American sources," and that it was "outrageous" for Khalidi to denounce Arabs that visited WINEP as "blundering dupes."

John Mearsheimer, a University of Chicago political science professor, and Stephen Walt, academic dean at Harvard Kennedy School at Harvard University, describe the Institute as "part of the core" of the pro-Israeli lobby in the United States. Discussing the group in their 2007 book, The Israel Lobby and US Foreign Policy, Mearsheimer and Walt wrote:

Although WINEP plays down its links to Israel and claims that it provides a "balanced and realistic" perspective on Middle East issues, this is not the case. In fact, WINEP is funded and run by individuals who are deeply committed to advancing Israel's agenda ... Many of its personnel are genuine scholars or experienced former officials, but they are hardly neutral observers on most Middle East issues and there is little diversity of views within WINEP's ranks.

In a 2014 study conducted by the University of Pennsylvania's Lauder Institute, of all think tanks worldwide, WINEP was ranked 42nd on both "Best Transdisciplinary Research Program at a Think Tank" and "Think Tanks with Outstanding Policy-Oriented Public Programs".

In a 2025 report, the Quincy Institute for Responsible Statecraft criticized WINEP for accepting dark money, and noted that the Institute "does not publicly disclose any information about its donors but publicly advertises that those who give the organization $25,000 or more 'are afforded unique opportunities to access our work, receiving invitations to intimate regional events, private dinners, and special visits to key policy venues in Washington.'"

== Notable current and former scholars ==
Several current and former members of WINEP have served in senior positions in the administrations of presidents George H. W. Bush, Bill Clinton, George W. Bush, Barack Obama and Donald Trump.

=== Board of Advisors ===
As of October 2024, the Washington Institute's advisory board included:

- John R. Allen, General, United States Marine Corps (ret.)
- Birch Evans "Evan" Bayh III, former United States Senator
- Howard Berman, former Member of Congress
- Eliot Cohen, Paul H. Nitze School of Advanced International Studies
- James F. Jeffrey, former U.S. Ambassador to Iraq and Turkey
- Edward Luttwak, senior associate at the Center for Strategic and International Studies
- Michael Mandelbaum, director of the American Foreign Policy program at the Paul H. Nitze School of Advanced International Studies
- Martin Peretz, former editor-in-chief of The New Republic
- Richard Perle, former Assistant Secretary of Defense
- Condoleezza Rice, former Secretary of State
- James Roche, former Secretary of the Air Force
- James G. Stavridis, Admiral, United States Navy (ret.), former Supreme Allied Commander
- R. James Woolsey, former Director of Central Intelligence
- Mortimer Zuckerman, publisher of U.S. News & World Report

Previous board members

- Warren Christopher (1925–2011), former Secretary of State
- Lawrence S. Eagleburger (1930–2011), former Secretary of State
- Alexander Haig (1914–2010), former Secretary of State
- Max Kampelman (1920–2013), former American diplomat
- Jeane Kirkpatrick (1926–2006), former United States Ambassador to the United Nations
- Henry Kissinger (1923–2023), former Secretary of State
- Samuel W. Lewis (1930–2014), former United States Ambassador to Israel
- Joseph Lieberman (1942–2024), former United States Senator
- Robert McFarlane (1937–2022), former National Security Advisor
- Walter F. Mondale (1928–2021), former Vice President of the United States
- George P. Shultz (1920–2021), former Secretary of State

== See also ==
- Institute for National Security Studies (Israel); INSS shares some staff with TWI
