= Legitimacy of the State of Israel =

Question of whether Israeli political authority is legitimate or not

The legitimacy of the State of Israel has been questioned since before the state was formed. There has been opposition to Zionism, the movement to establish a Jewish state in Palestine, since its emergence in 19th-century Europe. Since the establishment of the State of Israel and the concurrent Nakba in 1948, a number of figures, organizations, and states have challenged Israel's political legitimacy and its occupation of territories belonging to Palestine, Syria, Lebanon, and Egypt. Over the course of the Israeli–Palestinian conflict and broader Arab–Israeli conflict, the country's authority has also been questioned on a number of fronts.

Criticism of Israel may include opposition to the belief that the state has a right to exist or, since the 1967 Arab–Israeli War, the established power structure within the Israeli-occupied territories. Israel has also been accused of crimes against humanity and war crimes—such as apartheid, starvation (Note: On 9 July 2024, a group of UN experts released a statement that Israel's "targeted starvation campaign" had caused the death of children in Gaza and that famine had spread from the North to the rest of Gaza. The statement cited the deaths of 3 children who had recently died of malnutrition in Gaza, saying: "When the first child dies from malnutrition and dehydration, it becomes irrefutable that famine has taken hold.") and genocide—including by scholars, legal experts, and human rights organizations. Israel regards such criticism as attempts to delegitimize it. According to Agnès Callamard, the Secretary General of Amnesty International, Israel has maintained "the longest and one of the most deadly military occupations in the world".

On 11 May 1949, Israel was admitted to the United Nations (UN) as a full member state. It also has bilateral ties with each of the permanent members of the United Nations Security Council. As of 2025, 29 of the 193 UN member states do not formally recognize Israeli sovereignty; 26 of the 29 non-recognizing countries are located within the Muslim world, with Cuba, North Korea, and Venezuela representing the remainder. Most of the governments opposed to Israel have cited the ongoing Israeli–Palestinian conflict and Israel's ongoing military occupation of the West Bank, East Jerusalem, and the Gaza Strip as the basis for their stance.

In the early 1990s, Israeli prime minister Yitzhak Rabin and Palestinian political leader Yasser Arafat exchanged the Letters of Mutual Recognition. Pursuant to this correspondence, the Palestine Liberation Organization (PLO) formally recognized Israel's right to exist as a sovereign state while Israel formally recognized the PLO as a legitimate entity representing the Palestinians. This development aimed to set the stage for negotiations towards a two-state solution (i.e., Israel alongside the State of Palestine), through what would become known as the Oslo Accords, as part of the Israeli–Palestinian peace process.

== Background ==
The Balfour Declaration of 1917 announced British sponsorship of the Zionist aspiration to establish "a national home for the Jewish people" in Palestine. When the Jewish population represented less than 10% of the population of Palestine, the League of Nations codified support for the eventual "establishment in Palestine of a national home for the Jewish people" into the foundational document of British Mandatory rule in Palestine, thereby facilitating the Zionist colonization of Palestine.

The British colonial government in Mandatory Palestine recognized Zionist organizations, which created the structure of a quasi state, as self-governing institutions that legitimately represented the Jewish population. Chief among these organizations were the General Council of the Jewish Community of Palestine (ועד לאומי Va'ad Le'umi) and the Jewish Agency for Palestine—originally established in 1908 as the Palestine Office of the Zionist Organization and renamed the Jewish Agency for Israel after the establishment of Israel in 1948—which was extended quasi-official diplomatic status by Britain and the League of Nations, giving the Zionist movement international legitimacy. The Jewish Agency, by the Mandate for Palestine, was "recognized as a public body for the purpose of advising and cooperating with the Administration of Palestine," and it was entitled to diplomatic representation in the League of Nations Permanent Mandates Commission in Geneva, as well as in London and elsewhere.

The British colonial government did not similarly recognize the Arab majority in Palestine, which it referred to as "non-Jewish communities," and which did not have any international recognition.

== Diplomatic normalization and legitimacy ==
The Israeli national emblem, showcasing a menorah surrounded by olive branches with "Israel" written in Hebrew below it, was adopted in 1949.

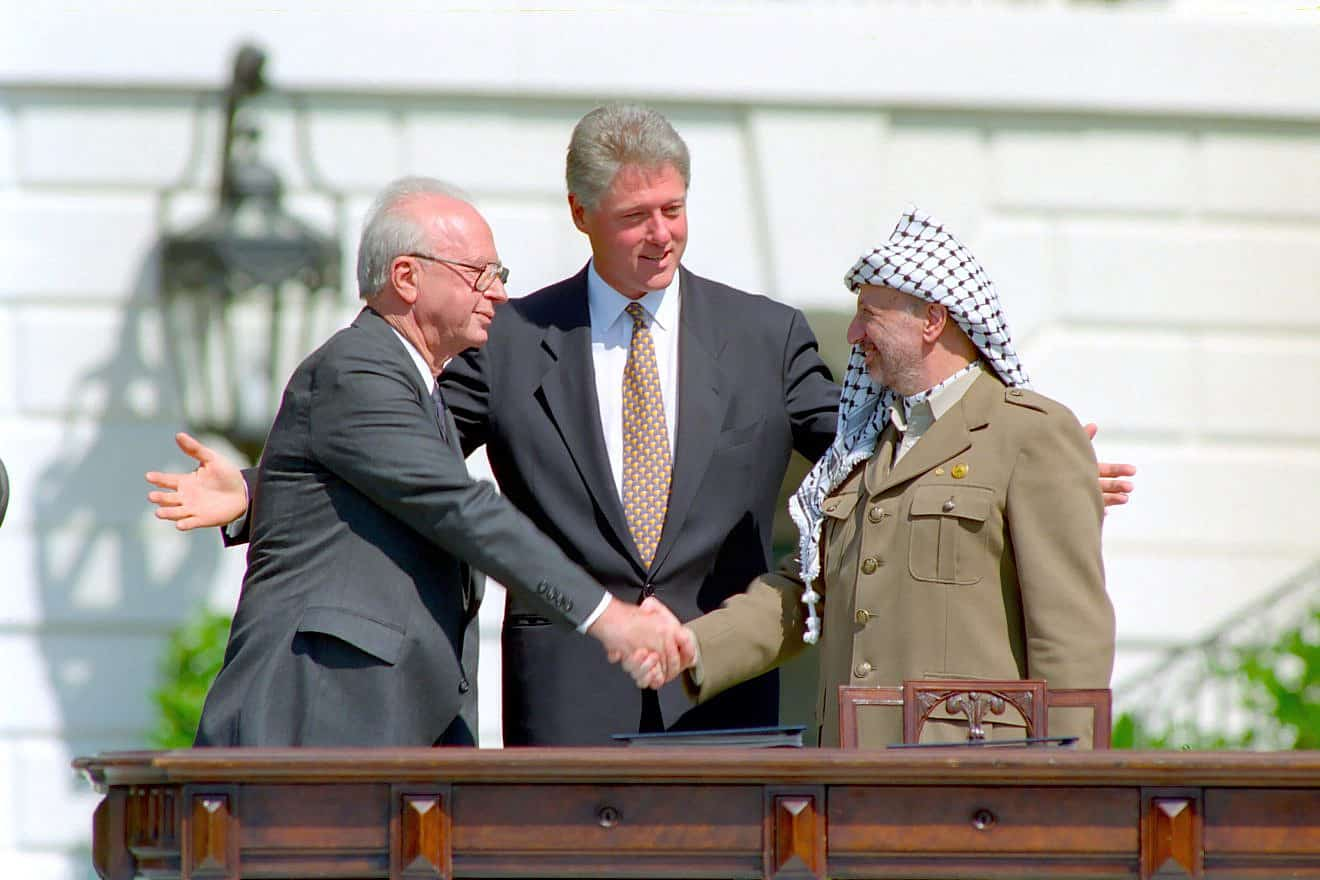
Yitzhak Rabin, Bill Clinton, and Yasser Arafat at the Oslo Accords signing ceremony, 13 September 1993

On May 14, 1948, in the midst of the 1948 Palestine war, leaders of the Zionist Organization, the Jewish Agency, and the broader Yishuv declared the establishment of the State of Israel in what was at the time Mandatory Palestine. The Israeli provisional government (1948–1949) was promptly granted de facto recognition by the United States, followed by Iran (which had voted against the Partition Plan), Guatemala, Iceland, Nicaragua, Romania, and Uruguay. The Soviet Union was the first country to grant de jure recognition to Israel on 17 May 1948, followed by Nicaragua, Czechoslovakia, Yugoslavia, and Poland. The United States extended de jure recognition after the first Israeli election, on 31 January 1949.

In 1988, the Palestine Liberation Organization (PLO), the official representative of the Palestinian people, accepted the existence of the State of Israel and advocated for the full implementation of UN Security Council 242. Following the Oslo I Accord in 1993, the PLO officially recognized the State of Israel and pledged to reject violence, and Israel recognized the PLO as the representative of the Palestinian people. Palestinian Authority leader Mahmoud Abbas said, while speaking at the UN regarding Palestinian recognition, "We did not come here seeking to delegitimize a state established years ago, and that is Israel."

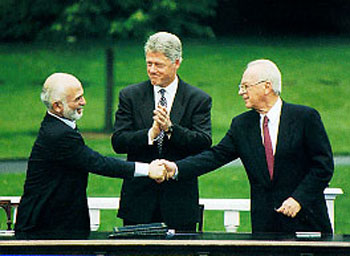
A handshake between King Hussein of Jordan and Yitzhak Rabin, accompanied by Bill Clinton, during the Israel–Jordan peace negotiations, 25 July 1994

Hamas denies the legitimacy of the Oslo I Accord, but has said it accepts the framework of peace based on two states on 1967 borders. In the 1990s, Islamic and leftist movements in Jordan attacked the Israel–Jordan Treaty of Peace as legitimization. Significant minorities in Jordan see Israel as an illegitimate state, and reversing the normalization of diplomatic relations was, at least until the late 1990s, central to Jordanian discourse.

In 2002 the Arab League unanimously adopted the Arab Peace Initiative at their Beirut summit. The comprehensive peace plan called for full normalization of Arab-Israeli relations in return for full Israeli withdrawal from the territories occupied in June 1967. Turki bin Faisal Al Saud of Saudi Arabia said that, in endorsing the initiative, every Arab state had "made clear that they will pay the price for peace, not only by recognizing Israel as a legitimate state in the area, but also to normalise relations with it and end the state of hostilities that had existed since 1948". Subsequently, there are currently six members of the Arab League which unambiguously recognize Israel: Bahrain, Egypt, Jordan, Morocco, United Arab Emirates and Palestine; and most of the non-Arab members of the Organization of Islamic Cooperation also recognize Israel. Mauritania, Oman and Sudan are ambiguous on this question, having publicly retreated or not formally concluded recognition of Israel.

Starting from 27 June 2024, Germany requires all those applying for naturalization to affirm Israel's right to exist. Opponents of this law say that it infringes on freedom of speech. As of 2025, 29 United Nations member states do not formally recognize the State of Israel. This includes 16 members of the Arab League (Algeria, Comoros, Djibouti, Iraq, Kuwait, Lebanon, Libya, Mauritania, Oman, Qatar, Saudi Arabia, Somalia, Sudan, Syria, Tunisia, and Yemen); 10 non-Arab members of the Organisation of Islamic Cooperation (Afghanistan, Bangladesh, Brunei, Indonesia, Iran, Malaysia, Maldives, Mali, Niger, and Pakistan); and Cuba, North Korea, and Venezuela.

== International law ==
Many jurists, including Henry Cattan and John B. Quigley, have questioned Israel's legitimacy, arguing that the Balfour Declaration, Mandate for Palestine and United Nations Partition Plan for Palestine were all illegitimate.

Cattan stated that claims based on 2000-year-old historical ties have no basis in international law. He cited Lord Sydenham's analogy that Jewish governance of Palestine was not longer than Roman governance of Britain; if this claim could be accepted, Cattan noted the Romans can reclaim Britain. Cattan further argued that the Balfour Declaration was illegal because as Britain did not have sovereignty over Palestine when the declaration was issued, nemo dat quod non habet (no one can give what they do not have). Since Britain didn't control Palestine, it couldn't promise it to anyone. The declaration also ignored the wishes of the vast majority of Palestine's population (Muslims, Christians, and even indigenous Jews who opposed political Zionism) and contradicted the McMahon–Hussein correspondence.

Cattan also argued that the Mandate for Palestine violated Article 22 of the Covenant of the League of Nations, which required mandates to be for the benefit of the local population and lead to independence, and the wishes of local communities must be a principal consideration in the selection of the Mandatory. Britain treated Palestine as a colony for the benefit of Jewish immigrants. The King-Crane Commission showed Palestinian Arabs wanted both the Mandate for Palestine to be given to the United States and for any outside ruler to not support Zionism, which was ignored, and therefore contradicted Article 22. Quigley proposed that the principle of self-determination had been a part of the international law in the 1920s. In a decision regarding Åland by the League of Nations, jurists stated that the principle of self-determination cannot apply in Åland because Finland's sovereignty was stable and well recognised. It can apply if the sovereignty is absent, transitory or not fully developed. The sovereign situation of Palestine was fluid after WWI, therefore, the Palestinian people should have the right to determine their fate.

Regarding the UN Resolution 181, Cattan noted that the United Nations is an organization of states, not a sovereign. It inherited no sovereignty from the League of Nations, nor did it have power to partition land. Partition violated this sovereignty and the UN Charter. Moreover, Harry Truman's memoirs revealed the intense lobbying and pressure campaigns used to secure votes. And pro-Zionist powers repeatedly blocked attempts to refer these legal questions to the International Court of Justice, implying they knew their legal case was weak. Additionally, in 1946, Jewish people owned 5.66% of land and were 1/3 of the population, and Palestinians owned 47.77% of land. While the partition gave 57% of the land to the Jewish state, including the most fertile areas. Because Palestinian people owned 47.77% of land, even if UN gave all national and public land to the Jewish state, they can only get 52.23% of the whole Palestine at most, it obviously violates the Palestinian ownership of lands.

Cattan further pointed out that Israel did not fulfil the requirements of a sovereign state: a people, a defined territory, and a government. The majority of Israel citizens do not belong to this country, they are aliens came from other countries, using force and terror replaced the indigenous. When the Proclamation of the State of Israel was published, most of them even did not hold the citizenship of Palestine. Israel has no recognized boundary, with all territory belonging to Palestine and other Arab countries. Its government does not represent the people of this country, but represents foreign invaders. One of the co-author of the Proclamation of the State of Israel is "World Zionist Movement", who obviously had no power to establish a sovereign state in Palestine.

Furthermore, despite the illegitimacy of the UN Resolution 181, the de facto Israel is completely different from the "Jewish State" described in the UN resolution. There are more Palestinians than Jews in the territory originally allocated to Israel. Israel government expelled most Palestinians from their homeland to ensure the Jewish population as the majority. And it seized a large amount of territory that was not originally allocated to it. It is completely different from the Resolution 181 in both population and territory, therefore, regardless of the legitimacy of Resolution 181, it cannot legitimize an entity that is completely unrelated to its texts.

== Rhetoric of delegitimization ==
Following the 2006 Palestinian legislative election and Hamas' governance of the Gaza Strip, the term "delegitimization" has been frequently applied to rhetoric surrounding the Israeli–Palestinian conflict. Professor Emanuel Adler of the University of Toronto says that Israel is willing to accept a situation where its legitimacy may be challenged, because it sees itself as occupying a unique place in the world order. Stacie E. Goddard of Wellesley College suggests that the legitimacy of Israeli historical narratives is used as a tool to secure territory.

=== Legitimacy rhetoric in regional politics ===
Since the Islamic Revolution in 1979, Iran's official position has been to not recognize the State of Israel. According to psychologist Rusi Jaspal, Iranian officials and state media often employ pejorative terminology to delegitimize Israel. For example, he says they refer to Israel as the "Zionist regime" and "Occupied Palestine" to imply that it is an oppressive regime rather than a legitimate sovereign state. Jaspal says that such language is not reserved for the state alone, and that Israelis are often labelled "Zionists". Jaspal further says such rhetoric has been consistent in Iranian media, especially in English-language publications targeting international audiences.

Jordanian linguistics scholar Ibrahim Darwish suggests his own country's language use has changed following the peace treaty signed with Israel on 26 October 1994. Darwish suggests that before the treaty, Jordanian media employed terms like "Filastiin" (Palestine), "al-ardh al-muhtallah" (the occupied land), and "al-kayaan as-suhyuuni" ("the Zionist entity"), mirroring the state of war and ideological conflict. He says that, post-peace, there has been a noticeable shift to terms such as "Israel" and "the state of Israel".

=== Legitimacy rhetoric as antisemitism ===
Natan Sharansky, head of the Jewish Agency, and Canadian ex-Foreign Minister John Baird have characterized Israel's delegitimization—the third of the Three Ds of antisemitism—as the "new antisemitism". Sharansky and Alan Dershowitz, an American legal scholar, suggest that delegitimization is a double standard used to separate Israel from other legitimate nations. Sharansky says "when Israel's fundamental right to exist is denied – alone among all peoples in the world – this too is anti-Semitism"; Dershowitz says "only with respect to Israel does criticism quickly transform into demonization, delegitimization, and calls for its destruction". According to former Canadian attorney general Irwin Cotler, the number of anti-Israel resolutions passed by the UN is an example of this delegitimization.

Dore Gold, President of the Israeli think tank Jerusalem Center for Public Affairs (JCPA), suggests there is a "campaign to delegitimize Israel" based on three themes: a "denial of Israel's right to security", "portrayal of Israel as a criminal state", and "denial of Jewish history". Israeli philosophy scholar Elhanan Yakira also says portrayal of Israel as "criminal" and denial of Jewish history, specifically the Holocaust, are key to delegitimization. Dershowitz suggests other standard lines of delegitimization include claims of Israeli colonialism, that its statehood was not granted legally, that it engages in apartheid, and that the one-state solution is necessary to resolve the Israel–Palestine conflict.

=== Legitimacy rhetoric as distraction ===
US President Barack Obama said, in a May 2011 speech, "efforts to delegitimize Israel" or "isolate Israel at the United Nations" would not work for the Palestinians and would not create "an independent [Palestinian] state".

In June 2011, M. J. Rosenberg, writing in the Los Angeles Times, suggested that the term "delegitimization" was a "distraction", whose purpose was to divert attention away from world opposition to the "illegitimate" Israeli occupation of the West Bank and blockade of the Gaza Strip, from the legality of Israeli settlements, and from "the ever-louder calls for Israel to grant Palestinians equal rights". He concludes that "It's not the Palestinians who are delegitimizing Israel, but the Israeli government, which maintains the occupation. And the leading delegitimizer is Netanyahu, whose contemptuous rejection of peace is turning Israel into an international pariah."

=== Calls for the dissolution of the State of Israel ===
Critics or opponents of Zionism, or anti-Zionists, have called for the dissolution of the State of Israel as a state for Jews. This is often proposed as a one-state solution to the conflict, in which Israelis and Palestinians coexist as equal citizens with equal rights. In 1996, the idea of Israel as a "state for all its citizens" was raised by Balad, a Palestinian party in Israel, stoking debates around Israel's characterization of itself as a Jewish and democratic state.

Supporters of Israel have argued that anti-Zionism—opposition to Zionism, rooted in the belief that the establishment and expansion of the State of Israel has been flawed or unjust and therefore illegitimate in some way—amounts to antisemitism.

=== Calls for the destruction of Israel ===
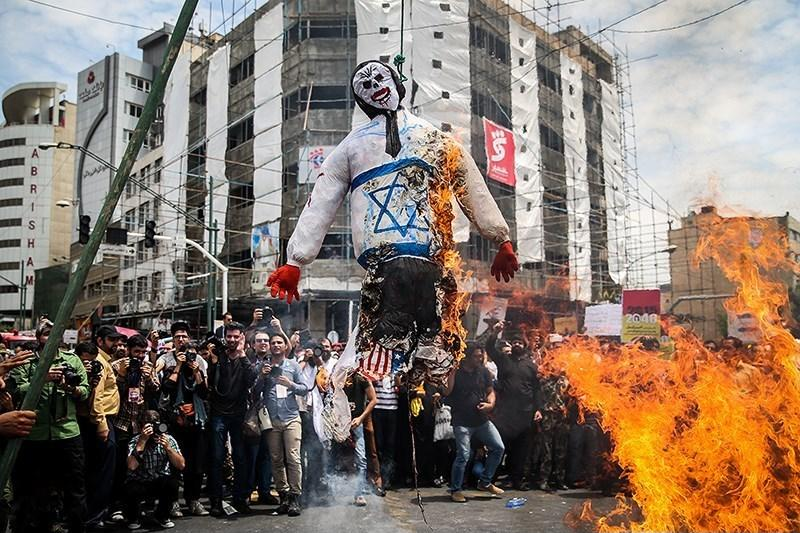
Participants burn a large effigy adorned with the Flag of Israel during Quds Day in Tehran (2016)

Joel Fishman suggests that "the purpose of delegitimization on the international level is to isolate an intended victim from the community of nations as a prelude to bringing about its downfall and ultimate destruction". Explicit or implicit calls for the destruction of the State of Israel as a political entity have been made in official statements, speeches, charters, or public discourse, and have sought such destruction through military, political or ideological action.

Irwin Cotler coined the term "genocidal antisemitism" to describe public calls and incitements to destroy Israel, which he says includes official promotion of anti-Israel sentiments in Ahmadinejad's Iran; the ideologies of groups like Hamas, Palestinian Islamic Jihad, Hezbollah, and al-Qaeda, which have advocated for Israel's destruction or endorsed acts of terror to achieve this goal; and religious fatwas and execution writs which frame genocidal calls against Israelis as religious obligations or portray Israel as a collective enemy.

Calls for the destruction of Israel have been reported since the 1940s. In October 1947, in response to the United Nations Special Committee on Palestine (UNSCOP) report, Azzam Pasha, the Secretary-General of the Arab League, said:

Personally, I hope the Jews do not force us into this war, because it would be a war of extermination and momentous massacre which will be spoken of like the Mongolian massacre and the Crusades.

Efraim Karsh and David Barnett have characterized this quote as a genocidal threat. Tom Segev contests the interpretation, saying Pasha was resigned to a war which he was not sure the Arabs would win. He further quotes Pasha as saying:

Whatever the outcome, the Arabs will stick to their offer of equal citizenship for Jews in Arab Palestine and let them be as Jewish as they like.

In the years running up to the 1967 Six-Day War, Egyptian President Gamal Abdel Nasser made calls for the annulment of Israel's existence as a solution to the conflict, associating Israel with European imperialism. In 1964, he said:

We swear to God that we shall not rest until we restore the Arab nation to Palestine and Palestine to the Arab nation. There is no room for imperialism and there is no room for Britain in our country, just as there is no room for Israel within the Arab nation.

Palestinian Islamist organizations like Hamas and the Palestinian Islamic Jihad have advocated for Israel's destruction. Elements of pro-Palestinian discourse have also been described as advocating for the destruction of Israel, including slogans, boycotts, proposals for a one-state solution, and calls for the Palestinian right of return. For example, Germany's Federal Office for the Protection of the Constitution has described BDS's 2005 founding manifesto, which calls for an end to the "occupation and colonization of all Arab lands", as a direct demand for "the end to the existence of Israel as a state".

Anti-Israeli protests in the Middle East have often involved the burning of Israeli flags and chants such as "Death to Israel". Pierre Birnbaum says that, in Paris, North African demonstrators have also uttered cries of "death to the Jews, death to Israel". During Quds Day in Iran and other countries, rallies and marches frequently feature chants of "Death to Israel, Death to America".

== Effect of delegitimization to peace ==
According to Gerald Steinberg, attacks on Israel's legitimacy are a barrier to the Israeli–Palestinian peace process. Former head of Israeli intelligence Amos Yadlin and Israeli politician and diplomat Tzipi Livni have suggested that delegitimization threatens Israeli security. Yadlin said delegitimization was "a graver threat than war" while Livni said it "limits our ability to protect ourselves". During Operation Pillar of Defense, David Schwartz said that demands for Israel to not enter Gaza were a "delegitimization of Israel's right to defend itself".

In 1993, Thomas Friedman, writing for The New York Times, said that a century of delegitimization of the other side had been a barrier to peace for Israelis and Palestinians, and "made sure that the other was never allowed to really feel at home in Israel". Daniel Bar Tal suggests that "mutual delegitimization" deepens and prolongs antipathy, writing:

Delegimization allows practices that would otherwise be unthinkable, practices like discrimination, exploitation, expulsion, mass killings, and genocide. Without the justification provided by delegitimization, many people would have great difficulty to commit such acts. Thus, it is absolutely imperative that any movement towards conflict resolution and especially reconciliation requires abolition of the delegitimization.

Amnesty International has argued that the peace process is "already dead", and is often used as an excuse to violate the human rights of Palestinians. Irwin Cotler, former Canadian Attorney General, says that delegitimization is "masked" in UN resolutions against Israel and abuses of universal jurisdiction, which are "laundered under the cover of human rights" or accusations of racism and apartheid against Israel. Yousef Munayyer suggests it is important for international actors to realize that Israel is practicing apartheid, and accurately describing Israeli policies will motivate the international community to take action against Israel's human rights violations.

Nathan Thrall suggests the most effective way to peace is to pressure Israel to change course. As examples for the effectiveness of this strategy, he highlights the actions of President Eisenhower in the 1956 Suez Crisis, President Ford in 1975, President Carter in 1977 and 1978, and US secretary of state James Baker in 1991. (Note: In the 1956 Suez Crisis, President Eisenhower leveraged the possibility of economic sanctions to convince Israel to withdraw from Sinai and Gaza. In 1975, President Ford suspended new arms deals with Israel until it agreed to a second Sinai withdrawal. In 1977, President Carter said he would terminate US military assistance to Israel if it did not immediately evacuate Lebanon. In 1978, Carter also told Israel and Egypt that the United States would withhold aid if the countries did not sign an agreement at Camp David. In 1991, US secretary of state James Baker forced Prime Minister Yitzhak Shamir to attend negotiations in Madrid by suggesting it would withhold a $10bn loan Israel needed.) Thrall has said that "occupation delegitimises Zionism and causes discord within Israel", whereas a long-term peace agreement would hinder "efforts to delegitimise Israel and [facilitate] the normalisation of relations with other nations of the region". He further suggests that suppressing protest makes violence more likely "to those who have few other means of upsetting the status quo". (Note: Thrall: "When peaceful opposition to Israel's policies is squelched and those with the capacity to dismantle the occupation don't raise a finger against it, violence invariably becomes more attractive to those who have few other means of upsetting the status quo.")

== See also ==
- Antisemitism in the Arab world
- Anti-Zionism
  - Timeline of Anti-Zionism
- Criticism of Israel
- Israeli right to self-defense
- New antisemitism
- Political status
- Self-determination
- United Nations General Assembly Resolution 3379
