= Friedkin =

Friedkin is a surname. Notable people with the surname include:

- Amy Friedkin (born 1947), president of the American Israel Public Affairs Committee (AIPAC)
- Anthony Friedkin (born 1949), American photographer
- Dan Friedkin (born 1965), American billionaire businessman
- Jay Friedkin, film editor
- Kenny Friedkin (1915–1962), American aviator and businessman
- Thomas H. Friedkin (1935–2017), American billionaire businessman
- William Friedkin (1935–2023), American film director, producer, and screenwriter
