= Larry Weinberg =

American basketball executive and lobbyist

- Born: January 23, 1926; New York City, U.S.
- Died: January 1, 2019 (aged 92); Los Angeles, California, U.S.
- Education: Cornell University; University of Arizona; UCLA
- Occupation: Real estate developer
- Known for: Owner of the Portland Trail Blazers
- Spouse: Barbi
- Children: 4

Larry Weinberg (January 23, 1926 – January 1, 2019) was an American real estate developer. He was well-known as being one of the founders of the NBA's Portland Trail Blazers.

== Early life and education ==
Born to a Jewish family in New York City, Weinberg served in the US 6th Army Group as an infantryman during World War II. He was severely wounded in combat in France and spent over a year recovering in a US military hospital. He attended Cornell University, the University of Arizona, and the University of California at Los Angeles.

== Career ==
In 1948, Weinberg founded the Larwin Company, serving as its CEO until he retired.

In 1950, Weinberg founded Com-Air Products, Inc. which designed, manufactured, and assembled the hydraulics, pneumatics and fuel assemblies used in jet engines and aircraft. He went on to serve as a Member of the Executive Committee and the Board of Directors of CNA Financial from 1969 to 1980.

=== Trail Blazers ===
In 1970, Weinberg, Herman Sarkowsky, and Robert Schmertz paid $3.7 million to secure an NBA expansion team for Portland. Weinberg became president of the Trail Blazers in 1975, replacing Sarkowsky, who turned his attention to the NFL's fledgling Seattle Seahawks. Two years later, the Trail Blazers won an NBA championship. Weinberg served as team president until 1988, when he sold the team to Microsoft co-founder Paul Allen. The Trail Blazers honored Weinberg in 1992 by retiring a #1 jersey with his name. Nonetheless, although no Trail Blazers had ever worn #1 before it was retired for Weinberg, nine Trail Blazers have worn #1 since, including: Rod Strickland (1993-2001), Derek Anderson (2002–2005), Jarrett Jack (2006–2008), Ike Diogu (2009), Armon Johnson (2011–2012), Jared Jeffries (2013), Dorell Wright (2014–2015), Evan Turner (2017–2019) and Anfernee Simons (2020–2025).

=== AIPAC ===
Weinberg served as president of the American Israel Public Affairs Committee. Elected head of AIPAC in 1976 and leaving the role in 1982, Weinberg developed personal connections to Menachem Begin, developed acrimony towards Jimmy Carter, and forged an alliance with the Reagan White House. Weinberg brought in Tom Dine in 1980 and Steven Rosen as Dine's second-in-command as Dine's research director.

After leaving his role as AIPAC president in 1982, Weinberg set himself the task of creating a Washington think tank to sculpt the ideas around Middle East policy. Weinberg's wife Barbi was a founder of The Washington Institute for Near East Policy.

== Personal life ==
Weinberg was awarded the Brotherhood Award of the National Conference of Christians and Jews.

Weinberg died on January 1, 2019, at age 92.

== Notes ==
Sporting positions
Preceded by Herman Sarkowsky	Portland Trail Blazers owner 1975–1988	Succeeded by Paul Allen
