= Morris J. Amitay =

American lobbyist (1936–2023)

Morris J. Amitay (July 5, 1936 – February 10, 2023) was an American lobbyist who was the executive director of the American Israel Public Affairs Committee (AIPAC) (1974–1980), vice chairman of the Jewish Institute for National Security Affairs (JINSA), and the founder and treasurer of the Washington Political Action Committee. He was credited for turning AIPAC "into one of the most effective advocacy organizations in Washington" by The Washington Post.

== Early life and education ==
Amitay was born in New York City on July 5, 1936.

Amitay earned his undergraduate degree from Columbia University, his J.D. degree from Harvard Law School (where he wrote his thesis for Henry Kissinger's Defense Policy Seminar) and a Master's degree in Public Administration from Harvard University.

== Career ==
Amitay was a Foreign Service Officer from 1962 to 1969, with assignments in Italy, South Africa and the State Department.

In 1981, he founded the Washington Political Action Committee, which through 2018 had contributed almost four million dollars to Israel's supporters in the U.S. Congress.

Before taking over AIPAC, Amitay worked in the U.S. House of Representatives and for five years as a legislative aide in the U.S. Senate, where he "took a lead role in organizing congressional initiatives affecting Israel and Soviet Jewry".

Amitay became AIPAC president in 1974, succeeding Isaiah L. Kenen and leading for six years. Amitay transformed AIPAC, making it more aggressive and confrontational. He computerized the AIPAC offices, moved it to Capitol Hill, swelled the office staff from a handful to dozens, and increased the annual budget from $400,000 to $1.2 million. The list of key contacts held by Kenan expanded from hundreds to eleven thousand. Membership increased to over 55 thousand.

Amitay appeared as a commentator on a number of national radio and television programs including CNN, National Public Radio, the Lehrer Report, the Voice of America, Fox News and the BBC.

== Personal life and death ==
On July 25, 1977, Amitay's home was the target of a bomb that killed the family dog but caused no other injuries.

Amitay resided in Rockville, Maryland. He died on February 10, 2023, at the age of 86.

== See also ==
- Lobbying in the United States
