= Peter Kenen =

American economist (1932–2012)

- Born: Peter Bain Kenen; November 30, 1932; Cleveland, Ohio, U.S.
- Died: December 17, 2012 (aged 80); Princeton, New Jersey, U.S.
- Education: Columbia University (BA); Harvard University (PhD)
- Occupation: Economist
- Spouse: Regina H. Kenen
- Children: 4
- Parent(s): Isaiah L. Kenen; Beatrice Bain

Peter Bain Kenen (November 30, 1932 – December 17, 2012) was an American economist, who was the Walker Professor of Economics and International Finance at Princeton University, and senior fellow in international economics at the Council on Foreign Relations.

== Early life ==
Kenen was born in Cleveland, Ohio in 1932, and attended The Bronx High School of Science. He earned his B.A. from Columbia University in 1954 and his Ph.D. from Harvard University in 1958. He taught at Columbia from 1957 to 1971, where he served as chairman of the Department of Economics and was named as provost of the university. While at Columbia, Kenen was a resident of Teaneck, New Jersey. He studied at the London School of Economics in 1957.

== Career ==
He was director of the International Finance Section at Princeton from 1971 to 1999. He is best known for his work on the theory of optimum currency areas, in which he argued that groups of countries with diversified domestic production are more likely to constitute optimum currency areas than groups whose members are highly specialized. He was one of the first to advocate floating exchange rates for small countries.

Kenen's publications include British Monetary Policy and the Balance of Payments, which won the David A. Wells Prize at Harvard; Asset Markets, Exchange Rates and Economic Integration (with Polly Allen); The Theory of Optimum Currency Areas: An Eclectic View; Managing Exchange Rates; Economic and Monetary Union in Europe; The International Financial Architecture; and International Economic and Financial Cooperation (with Jeffrey Shafer, Nigel Wicks, and Charles Wyplosz). Recent publications include Regional Monetary Integration (with Ellen E. Meade), published in 2008 (Cambridge). He edited several books, including Managing the World Economy and Understanding Interdependence, and was co editor of the two volume Handbook of International Economics. He published numerous articles in scholarly journals, many of which have been reprinted in two volumes: Essays in International Economics and Exchange Rates and the Monetary System. In 1971, he co-authored the book International Economics with Raymond Lubitz.

Kenen was a consultant to the Council of Economic Advisers, the Office of Management and Budget, the Federal Reserve, the International Monetary Fund, and the United States Department of the Treasury. He was a member of President Kennedy's Task Force on Foreign Economic Policy, the Review Committee on Balance of Payments Statistics, the Economic Advisory Panel of the Federal Reserve Bank of New York, the Council on Foreign Relations, and the Group of Thirty. He was president of the Eastern Economic Association in 2000–01.

He held research fellowships from the Ford Foundation, the Social Science Research Council, and the German Marshall Fund, and he was a fellow of the Center for Advanced Study in the Behavioral Sciences, a Guggenheim Fellow, and Ford Research Professor at the University of California. In 1983–84, he was a professorial fellow at the Australian National University; in 1987–88, he was a visiting fellow at the Royal Institute of International Affairs; in 1991–92, he held the Houblon-Norman Fellowship at the Bank of England; and in 2002, he was professorial fellow at the Victoria University of Wellington and the Reserve Bank of New Zealand.

=== Selected publications ===
==== Books ====
- Managing the world economy: fifty years after Bretton Woods. Peterson Institute Press, 1994.
- Economic and monetary union in Europe: Moving beyond Maastricht, Cambridge University Press, 1995.
- The international economy, Cambridge University Press, 2000.
- The international financial architecture: What's new? What's missing?, Vol. 61. Peterson Institute, 2001.
- Regional monetary integration, EE Meade, 2007.

==== Academic papers ====
- "Employment Fluctuations and Wage Rigidity", Brookings Papers on Economic Activity, vol. 1980, no. 1, 1980.
- "Measuring and analyzing the effects of short-term volatility in real exchange rates", The Review of Economics and Statistics, 1986.
- "Currency Internationalisation: Lessons from the Global Financial Crisis and Prospects for the Future in Asia and the Pacific", BIS Paper No. 61, 2012.
- "Nature, capital, and trade." in Essays in International Economics, Princeton University Press, 2019.
- "The demand for international reserves", in Essays in International Economics. Princeton University Press, 2019.

== Death ==
Kenen died on December 17, 2012, after a battle with emphysema. He was 80 years old.
