= Betsy Berns Korn =

American activist and entrepreneur

- Born: Elizabeth Anne Berns
- Spouse: Douglas Robert Korn (m. 1996)

Betsy Berns Korn is an American activist and entrepreneur, serving as Chair of the Conference of Presidents of Major American Jewish Organizations (CoP) since 2025. Korn previously served as President of the American Israel Public Affairs Committee (AIPAC) from March 2020 through January 2023, then National Board Chair from 2023 to 2025.

== Early life and education ==
Korn attended Claremont McKenna College and Northwestern University.

== Career ==
In 1996, Korns founded sports media group BVision Sportsmedia.

=== AIPAC ===
Korn interned at AIPAC in 1989.

Korn joined the AIPAC National Board in 2012. In 2019, she was appointed president, succeeding Mort Fridman.

=== CoP ===
Korn was appointed Chair of the Conference of Presidents of Major American Jewish Organizations June 2025.

Following the election of Zohran Mamdani as Mayor of New York City in November 2025, Korns and CoP CEO William Daroff wrote, "The city with the United States' largest Jewish population will now be led by a man whose record and rhetoric reflect hostility toward Israel and the Jewish people."

She was subsequently re-elected in May 2026.

== Publications ==
- The Female Fan Guide to Pro Football (1999)
