= Isaiah L. Kenen =

American journalist and lawyer (1905–1988)

- Born: Isaiah Leo Kenen; March 7, 1905; St. Stephen, New Brunswick, Canada
- Died: March 23, 1988 (aged 83); Washington, D.C., U.S.
- Occupations: Journalist; lawyer
- Spouse: Beatrice Bain Kenen (m. 1969, died)
- Children: Peter Kenen
- Relatives: Lloyd Bochner (nephew); Hart Bochner (great-nephew)

Isaiah Leo "Si" Kenen (March 7, 1905 – March 23, 1988) was an American journalist and lawyer. He was the founder of the American Zionist Committee for Public Affairs (AZCPA), the forerunner of the American Israel Public Affairs Committee (AIPAC).

== Early life ==
Kenen was born on March 7, 1905, in St. Stephen, New Brunswick, Canada, the son of Rebecca (née Freedberg) and Emmanuel Kenen. His father, born in Kiev in Russian Empire (now Kyiv, Ukraine), was an insurance agent. His family was active in the Zionist movement, and his father established the first Bnei Zion club in Toronto and attended the first meetings of the World Zionist Congress. Kenen studied at the University of Toronto and majored in philosophy.

== Career ==
Kenen started working as a journalist at the Toronto Star and moved to Cleveland, Ohio in 1926. He studied law and was admitted to the Ohio Bar Association in 1933. He became active in the Zionist movement and in 1941 became president of the Cleveland Zionist District. In the 1940s, he served as the information director of the Jewish Agency, and following the establishment of the State of Israel in 1948, he served on the Israeli delegation to the United Nations. Regarding this period, he wrote in his book Israel's Defense Line:

Our Jewish community faced a challenge in 1942. Numbed and helpless bystanders as Adolf Hitler waged his demoniacal war against the Jewish people, embittered by our failure to rouse the democracies to deter Hitler, to rescue and open doors to those who might be saved, American Jews assumed their responsibility during World War II. Despite the opposition of the Department of State, they made a commitment to establish an independent Jewish state where Jews could live in freedom and security.

Kenen started AIPAC in 1944, running it mostly alone for its first three decades. At the time this was sufficient, as Israel was approached as a humanitarian cause in Washington at the time, not yet the high-stakes game they would later become during the Cold War. In keeping with the more relaxed environment on Israel, journalist J.J. Goldberg in 1996 describes Kenen's style of lobbying as "friendly, collegial". Kenen determined his goals through discussion with the leaders of American Zionist and pro-Israel organizations. When he required extra fire-power on Capitol Hill, he could open his rolodex of hundreds of Jewish community leaders who could reach out to their representatives.

Regarding the establishment of AIPAC he wrote:

The lobby for Israel, known as the American Israel Public Affairs Committee (AIPAC) since 1959, came into existence in 1951. It was established at that time because Israel needed American economic assistance to enable her to absorb the huge influx of refugees who poured into the country soon after statehood.

In his biography Israel's Defense Line, Kenen described his work transitioning from a registered foreign agent to a domestic lobbyist for Israel: "Israelis began looking for a lobbyist to promote the necessary legislation ... would I leave the Israeli delegation for six months to lobby on Capitol Hill? There were other questions. Should I continue my registration as an agent of the Israel government? Was it appropriate for an embassy to lobby? Embassies talked to the State Department, and American voters talked to their congressmen."

Kenen retired in 1974 shortly prior to the passage of the Jackson-Vanik amendment. Morris Amitay, one of the sculptors of the amendment, succeeded him. Amitay would go on to transition AIPAC into a more aggressive organization, suited for the post-Watergate world.

== Personal life ==
Kenen married Beatrice Bain, who was also a student at the University of Toronto. They had one son, Peter Kenen, who was a professor of economics at Princeton University.

His nephew was actor Lloyd Bochner and his great-nephew is actor Hart Bochner.

== Bibliography ==
- Isaiah L Kenen, Israel's Defense Line: Her Friends and Foes in Washington, Prometheus Books, 1981.
- Isaiah L Kenen, All my causes: An 80-year life span in many lands and for many causes, some we won and some we lost but we never gave up, Near East Research, 1985.
