= Amy Friedkin =

American lobbyist

Amy Rothschild Friedkin (born 1947) was the first female president of the American Israel Public Affairs Committee (AIPAC), from May 2002 until May 2004, then served as the national chair of AIPAC's board.

== Biography ==
Friedkin is a fourth-generation San Franciscan. She graduated from the University of Michigan in 1968. According to Howard Kohr, AIPAC's executive director, "[Friedkin] is deeply committed to American politics and a belief in the American political system and in the empowerment of American Jewry."

She was president of the Jewish Federation of the Greater East Bay from 1988-1990. She served on the United Jewish Appeal Young Women’s Leadership Cabinet and led numerous community missions to Israel. Friedkin was honored by the Jewish Women’s Archive and the Lions of Judah. Senator Gordon Smith (R-OR) said, “Amy is a bridge between Israel and America.” Additionally, long-time friend Senator Barbara Boxer (D-CA) said, “When Amy looks into the eyes of a legislator, they know she speaks from the heart. She has her facts straight. She has a deep commitment for Israel. It comes through. It’s contagious and very effective.”

In 2000, Friedkin was AIPAC vice president on the national board. She took the position of president from 2002 through 2004, the first woman to do so.

As of 2020, Friedkin was close with Democratic House Speaker Nancy Pelosi.

Friedkin has two sons by a former marriage to California attorney Alan J. Sternberg. Her grandson is Brian Sternberg, a speaker at the 2017 national AIPAC conference.
