= AIPAC =

Pro-Israel lobby group in the United States

American Israel Public Affairs Committee

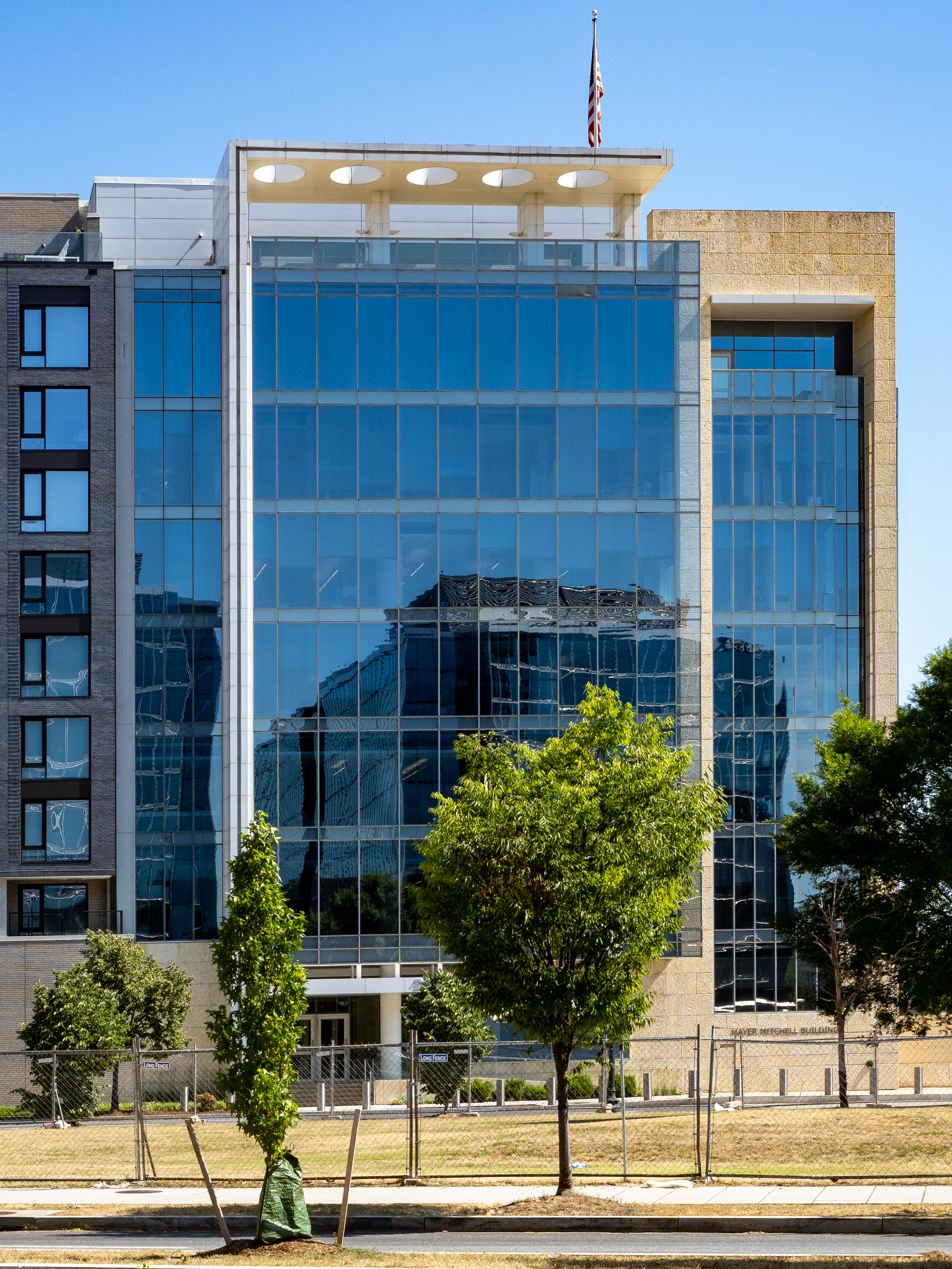
- AIPAC headquarters in Mount Vernon Triangle, Washington, D.C.
- Founded: 1954; 72 years ago
- Tax ID no.: 53-0217164
- Legal status: 501(c)(4) organization
- Headquarters: Washington, D.C., U.S.
- Coordinates: 38.9004676°N 77.0146576°W
- President, board of directors: Bernie Kaminetsky
- Chairman, board of directors: Michael Tuchin
- Chief executive officer: Elliot Brandt
- Subsidiaries: 251 Massachusetts Avenue LLC, American Israel Educational Foundation, AIPAC-AIEF Israel RA, AIPAC-PAC, United Democracy Project
- Revenue: $156,448,717 (2023–24)
- Expenses: $100,363,669 (2023–24)
- Endowment: $13,070,967
- Employees: 376 (2022)
- Volunteers: 47 (2022)
- Website: aipac.org
- Formerly called: American Zionist Committee for Public Affairs (1954–1959)

The American Israel Public Affairs Committee (AIPAC; /ˈeɪˌpæk/, AY-PAK) is an American pro-Israel lobbying group that advocates for policies strengthening Israel–United States relations. Founded in 1954 as the American Zionist Committee for Public Affairs, the organization adopted its current name in 1959. AIPAC is considered one of the most influential lobbying groups in the United States.

Until 2021, AIPAC did not raise funds for political candidates itself; its members raised money for candidates through political action committees unaffiliated with AIPAC and by other means. In late 2021, AIPAC formed its own political action committee, AIPAC PAC, and announced plans for a super PAC, the United Democracy Project, which can spend money on candidates' behalf. AIPAC's critics have said it acts as an agent of the Israeli government and that it has a "stranglehold" on the United States Congress.

AIPAC describes itself as a bipartisan organization, but reporting has found that its political spending has often supported efforts against candidates—mostly Democrats—considered "insufficiently supportive" of Israel. In the lead-up to the 2024 elections, The Guardian reported that AIPAC had recruited and supported challengers to candidates who had been critical of Israel's actions in the Gaza war. AIPAC has also been criticized as unrepresentative of the diversity of views among American Jews who support Israel, and for aligning closely with policies of right-wing Israeli governments.

As of 2025, AIPAC reports more than 5 million members in the U.S., 17 regional offices, and "a vast pool of donors". It was founded in 1954 by Isaiah L. Kenen, a lobbyist for the Israeli government, partly to counter international criticism of Israel's Qibya massacre of Palestinian villagers that year. AIPAC became an influential organization during the 1980s. In 2002, it expressed intent to lobby Congress to authorize use of force in Iraq, and in 2003, the Iraq War was defended at AIPAC events. In 2005, a Pentagon analyst pleaded guilty to espionage charges of passing U.S. government secrets to senior AIPAC officials, in what became known as the AIPAC espionage scandal.

== History ==
=== Formation (1943–1970s) ===
In 1943, Abba Hillel Silver, a rabbi from Cleveland, Ohio, formed the American Zionist Emergency Council (AZEC) to organize American Jews to contact their local representatives to support Jews in Mandatory Palestine. In 1949, AZEC was renamed the American Zionist Council (AZC). Isaiah L. Kenen, an American journalist and lobbyist for the Israeli government, was AZEC's information director.

In 1951 and 1952, Kenen began a lobbying effort to help Israel's troubled economy and secured $65 million and $73 million in U.S. aid for Israel.

In 1953, Kenan was worried he would be investigated by the State Department for not registering as a "foreign agent". He formed a separate entity that was not tax-exempt and could lobby for a foreign government, the American Zionist Committee for Public Affairs (AZCPA).

Kenen had previously worked for the Israeli Ministry of Foreign Affairs. As a lobbyist, he diverged from AZC's usual public relations efforts by trying to broaden support for Israel among traditionally non-Zionist groups. The founding of the new organization was in part a response to international criticism of the October 1953 Qibya massacre, in which Israeli troops under Ariel Sharon killed at least 69 Palestinian villagers, two-thirds of them women and children. As the Eisenhower administration suspected the AZC of being funded by the Israeli government, it was decided that the lobbying efforts should be separated into a separate organization with separate finances.

In 1959, AZCPA was renamed the American-Israel Public Affairs Committee, reflecting a broader membership and mission. Kenen led the organization until retiring in 1974, when he was succeeded by Morris J. Amitay. According to commentator M. J. Rosenberg, Kenen was "an old-fashioned liberal" who did not seek to win support by donating to campaigns or otherwise influencing elections, but was willing to "play with the hand that is dealt to us".

=== Rise (1970s to 1980s) ===
By the 1970s, the Conference of Presidents of Major American Jewish Organizations and AIPAC had assumed overall responsibility for Israel-related lobbying within the Jewish communal landscape. The Conference of Presidents was responsible for speaking to the Executive Branch of the U.S. government, while AIPAC dealt mainly with the Legislative Branch. Although it had worked effectively behind the scenes since its founding in 1953, AIPAC only became an influential organization in the 15 years after the Yom Kippur War in 1973.

By the mid-1970s, AIPAC had achieved the financial and political clout necessary to sway congressional opinion, according to former Israeli Ambassador to the U.S. Michael Oren. During this period, AIPAC's budget soared from $300,000 in 1973 to over $7 million during its peak years of influence in the late 1980s. Whereas Kenen had come out of the Zionist movement, with early staff pulled from the longtime activists among the Jewish community, AIPAC had evolved into a prototypical Washington-based lobbying and consulting firm. Leaders and staffers were recruited from legislative staff and lobbyists with direct experience with the federal bureaucracy. Confronted with opposition from both houses of Congress, President Gerald Ford rescinded his "reassessment". George Lenczowski notes a similar, mid-1970s time frame for the rise of AIPAC power: "It [the Jimmy Carter presidency] also coincides with the militant emergence of the American Israel Public Affairs Committee (AIPAC) as a major force in shaping American policy toward the Middle East."

In 1980, Thomas Dine became the executive director of AIPAC, and developed its grassroots campaign. By the late 1980s, AIPAC's board of directors was "dominated" by four successful businessmen—Mayer (Bubba) Mitchell, Edward Levy, Robert Asher, and Larry Weinberg.

AIPAC scored two major victories in the early 1980s that established its image among political candidates as an organization "not to be trifled with" and set the pace for "a staunchly pro-Israel" Congress over the next three decades. In 1982, activists affiliated with AIPAC in Skokie, Illinois, backed Richard J. Durbin to oust U.S. representative Paul Findley (R-Illinois), who had shown enthusiasm for PLO leader Yasir Arafat. In 1984, Senator Charles H. Percy (R-Illinois), then-chairman of the Senate Foreign Relations Committee and a supporter of a deal to allow Saudi Arabia to buy sophisticated airborne early warning and control (AWAC) military planes was defeated by Democrat Paul Simon. Simon was asked by Robert Asher, an AIPAC board member in Chicago, to run against Percy.

=== Contemporary period (Post–1980s) ===
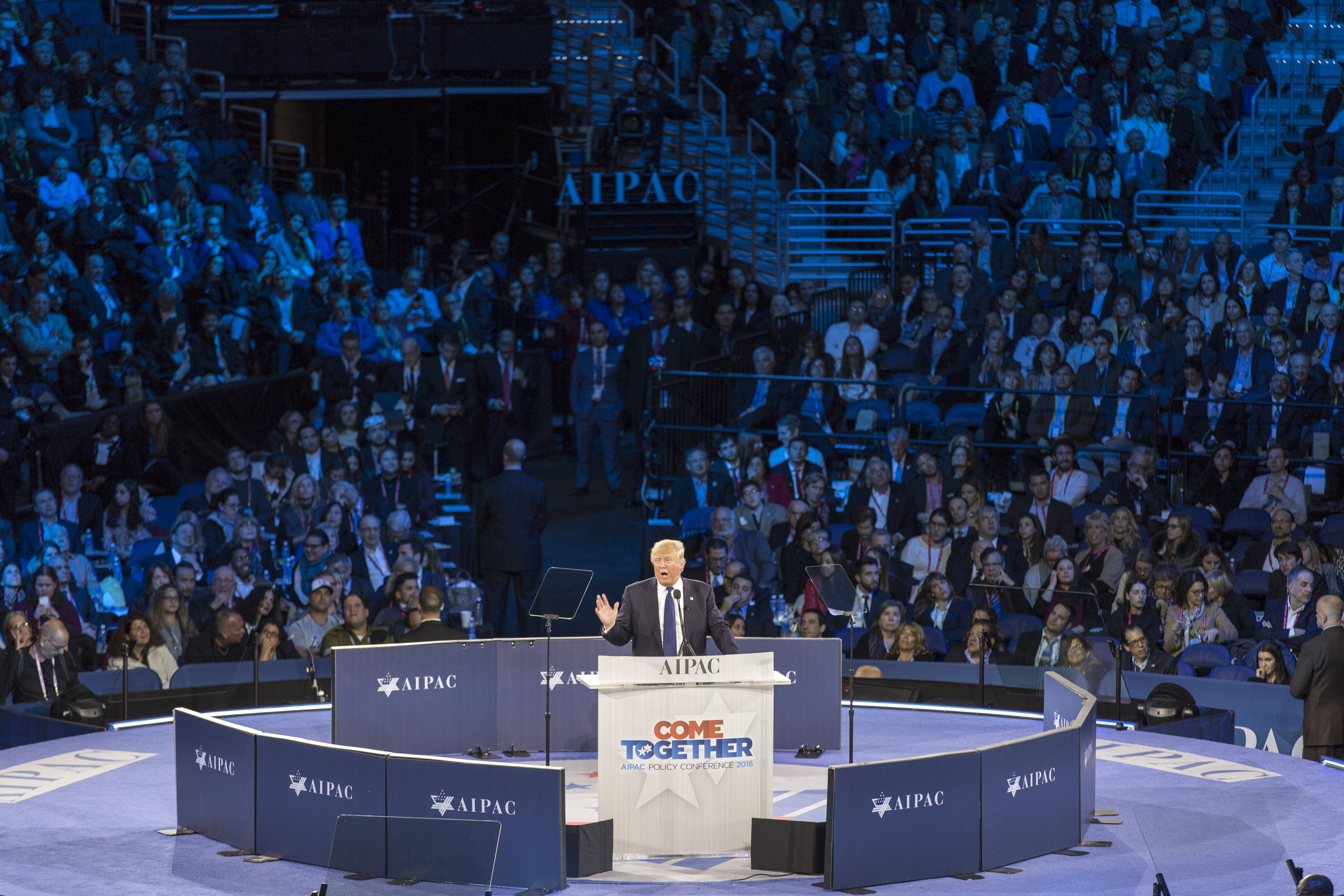
Donald Trump speaking at the 2016 AIPAC Policy Conference

AIPAC was an early supporter of the Counter-Terrorism Act of 1995, which led the FBI to commit more resources to fight terrorism.

In 2005, Lawrence Franklin, a Pentagon analyst pleaded guilty to espionage charges of passing U.S. government secrets to AIPAC policy director Steve J. Rosen and AIPAC senior Iran analyst Keith Weissman, in what is known as the AIPAC espionage scandal. Rosen and Weissman were later fired by AIPAC. In 2009, charges against the former AIPAC employees were dropped.

An AIPAC-supported House of Representatives resolution condemning the UN Goldstone Report on human rights violations by Israel in Gaza passed 344–36 in 2009.

In 2016, nearly 20,000 delegates attended the AIPAC Policy Conference, about 4,000 of them American students. For the first time in AIPAC's history, the conference's general sessions were held in Washington, D.C.'s Verizon Center to accommodate the large number of delegates. Keynote speakers included Vice President Joe Biden, former secretary of state Hillary Clinton, Republican presidential candidate Donald Trump, Governor John Kasich, Senator Ted Cruz, and Speaker Paul Ryan. Israeli prime minister Benjamin Netanyahu, who had spoken to AIPAC before in person, addressed the conference via satellite on its final day.

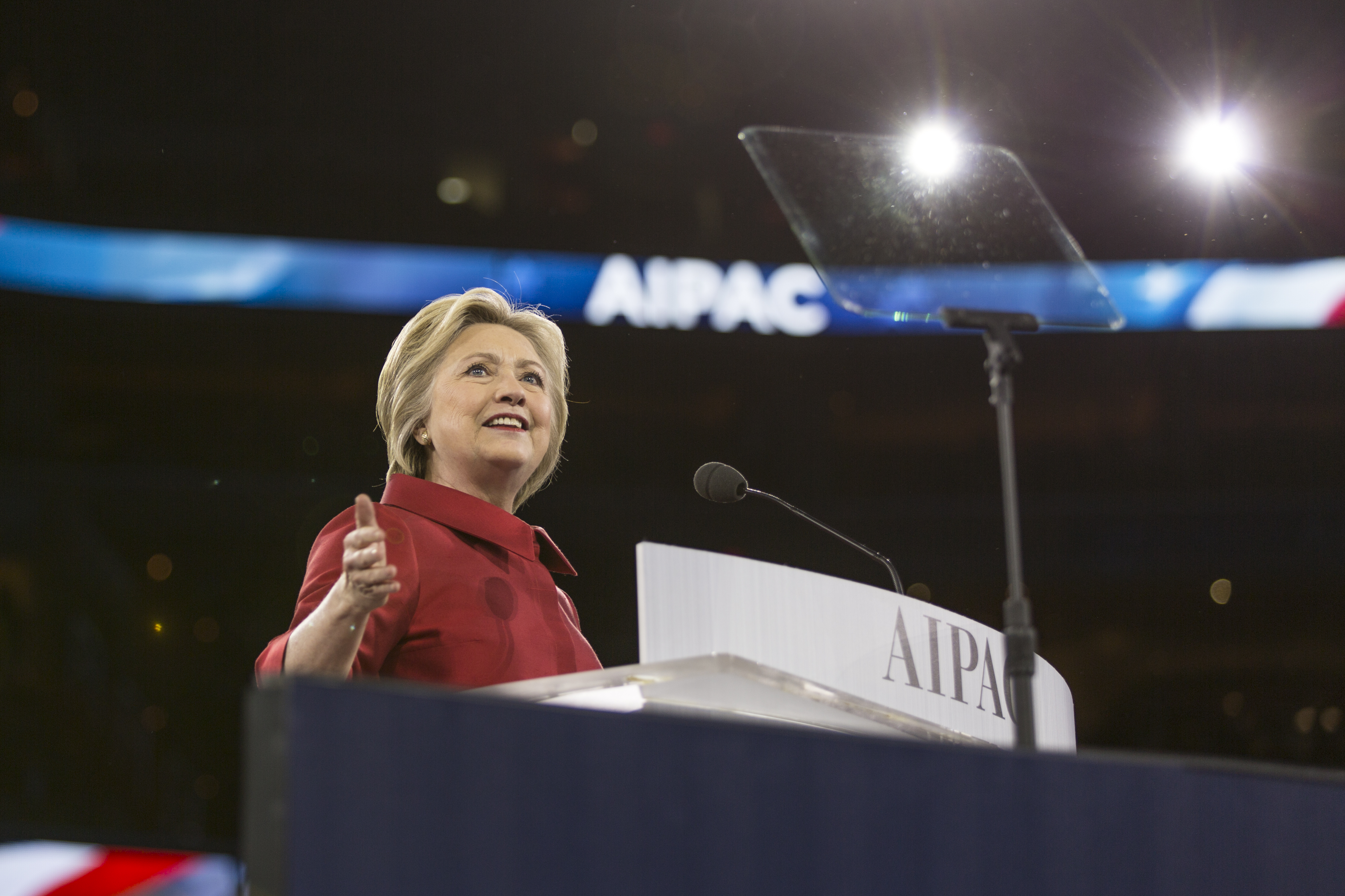
Hillary Clinton speaking at the 2016 AIPAC Policy Conference

Support among congressional members includes a majority of members of both the Democratic and Republican Parties. According to AIPAC, the annual Policy Conference is second only to the State of the Union address in the number of federal officials in attendance at an organized event.

In February 2019, freshman U.S. representative Ilhan Omar, one of the first two Muslim women (along with Rashida Tlaib) to serve in Congress, tweeted that House Minority Leader Kevin McCarthy's support for Israel was "all about the Benjamins" (i.e., about money). The next day, she clarified that she meant AIPAC. Omar later apologized but also made another statement attacking "political influence in this country that says it is okay to push for allegiance to a foreign country". The statement elicited anger among AIPAC supporters, but also vocal support among the progressive wing of the Democratic Party, and "revived a fraught debate" in US politics over whether AIPAC has too much influence over US policy in the Middle East, while highlighting the deterioration of some relationships between progressive Democrats and pro-Israel organizations. On March 6, 2019, the Democratic leadership put forth a resolution on the House floor condemning antisemitism, which was broadened to condemn bigotry against a wide variety of groups before it passed on March 7.

In August 2024, AIPAC's headquarters in Washington, D.C. were vandalized by anti-Israel activists. In the 2024 election cycle, AIPAC spent a record $45.2 million to defeat two progressive legislators critical of Israel, Jamaal Bowman and Cori Bush.

In 2025, several Democratic politicians who had previously received AIPAC support, including Deborah Ross, Valerie Foushee, Morgan McGarvey and Seth Moulton, said they would no longer accept donations from AIPAC. According to The Nation, "the pro-Israel consensus has evaporated among the Democratic and liberal base" and being uncritical of Israel was an "impediment to Democratic politicians." David Frank, a professor of communication at the University of Oregon, said AIPAC was "losing its hold on the American public" and that Track AIPAC helped make contributions from AIPAC "toxic". During the 2026 elections, AIPAC made contributions in 301 House of Representatives and 32 Senate elections. In 2026, AIPAC ended direct PAC contributions and endorsements for political candidates, a move ahead of the 2026 United States elections that may have been the result of backlash against its support of the Gaza war and the 2026 Iran war.

== Lobbying and legislative advocacy ==
AIPAC's stated purpose is to lobby the Congress of the United States on issues and legislation related to Israel. AIPAC regularly meets with members of Congress and holds events where it can share its views.

=== Lobbying strategies and methods ===
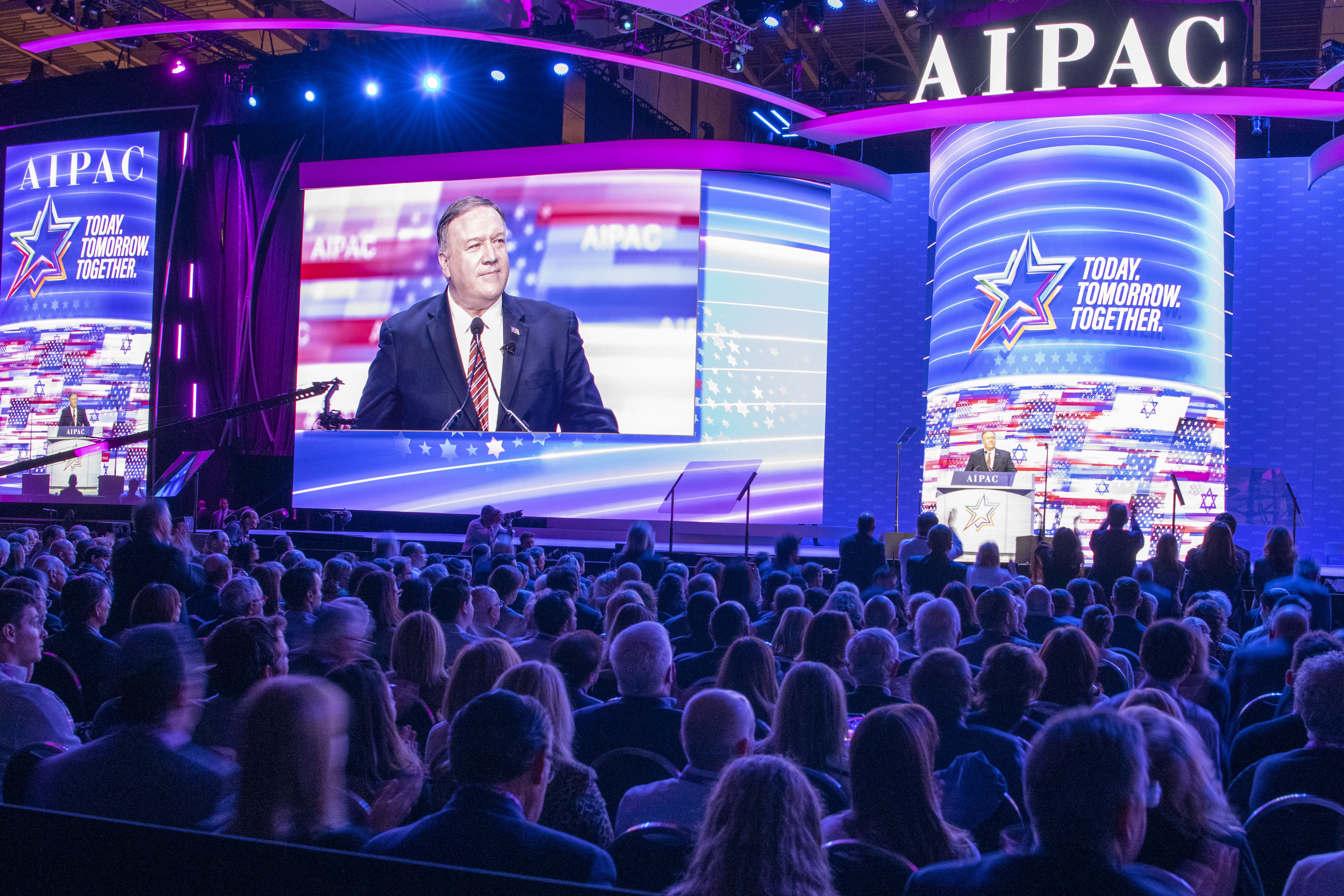
US secretary of state Mike Pompeo speaks at the AIPAC 2020 Policy Conference.

AIPAC director Thomas Dine developed a network to reach every member of Congress, with AIPAC staffers organizing every district's Jewish community, regardless of size. Today, thousands of AIPAC supporters gather at AIPAC's annual Policy Conference in Washington, D.C. every year. Donors and VIPs are invited to the Leadership Reception on the final night of the conference, which hosts hundreds of members of Congress.

AIPAC is not a political action committee and cannot donate to candidates. According to journalist Connie Bruck, by the end of the 1980s there were "dozens" of political action committees with no formal relation to AIPAC, but whose leader was often an AIPAC member. The Wall Street Journal reports that in 1987 at least 51 of 80 pro-Israel PACs were operated by AIPAC officials. Some committees that "operate independently" of AIPAC but "whose missions and membership align" with it include the Florida Congressional Committee, NORPAC in New Jersey, To Protect Our Heritage PAC near Chicago, and the Maryland Association for Concerned Citizens near Baltimore.

The Washington Post wrote that AIPAC's "Web site, which details how members of Congress voted on AIPAC's key issues, and the AIPAC Insider, a glossy periodical that handicaps close political races, are scrutinized by thousands of potential donors. Pro-Israel interests have contributed $56.8 million in individual, group, and soft money donations to federal candidates and party committees since 1990, according to the non-partisan OpenSecrets. Between the 2000 and the 2004 elections, the 50 members of AIPAC's board donated an average of $72,000 each to campaigns and political action committees." According to Dine, in the 1980s and 1990s contributions from AIPAC members often constituted "roughly 10 to 15% of a typical congressional campaign budget."

AIPAC influences lawmakers in other ways by:

- matching an AIPAC member with shared interests to a member of Congress. Sheryl Gay Stolberg calls the system of "key contacts" AIPAC's "secret" and quotes activist Tom Dine as saying that AIPAC's office can call on "five to 15" key contacts for every senator including "standoffish" ones.
- carefully curated trips to Israel for legislators and other opinion-makers, all-expenses-paid for by AIPAC's charitable arm, the American Israel Education Foundation. In 2005 alone, more than 100 members of Congress visited Israel, some multiple times.
- cultivating student leaders such as student body presidents. At colleges, it provides "political leadership training" to undergraduate student groups. This is an effort to "build a stronger pro-Israel movement among students on and off campuses nationwide."
- sympathy for Israel among the general public.

AIPAC has supported loyal incumbents (such as Senator Lowell Weicker) even when opposed by Jewish candidates, and it has worked to unseat pro-Palestinian incumbents (such as Representative Paul Findley) or candidates perceived to be unsympathetic to Israel (Senator Charles H. Percy). But one Jewish member of Congress, Representative Jan Schakowsky, who had maintained good relations with AIPAC and received campaign contributions from its members, was opposed by the group in her 2010 reelection campaign after she was endorsed by the advocacy group J Street.

According to former representative Brian Baird, "Any member of Congress knows that AIPAC is associated indirectly with significant amounts of campaign spending if you're with them, and significant amounts against you if you're not with them." "AIPAC-connected money" amounted to about $200,000 in each of his campaigns for office—"and that's two hundred thousand going your way, versus the other way: a four-hundred-thousand-dollar swing." AIPAC-directed campaign contributions—as with many interest groups—came with considerable "tactical input". AIPAC staffers told Baird and other lawmakers, "No, we don't say it that way, we say it this way." Baird complained, "There's a whole complex semantic code you learn. ... After a while, you find yourself saying and repeating it as if it were fact."

=== Foreign aid to Israel ===
AIPAC lobbies for financial aid from the U.S. to Israel, helping to procure up to $3 billion in aid yearly, making Israel "the largest cumulative recipient of U.S. foreign assistance since World War II". According to the Congressional Research Service (CRS), this includes aid "as all grant cash transfers, not designated for particular projects, and...transferred as a lump sum in the first month of the fiscal year, instead of in periodic increments. Israel is allowed to spend about one quarter of the military aid for the procurement in Israel of defense articles and services, including research and development, rather than in the United States."

In March 2009, AIPAC executive director Howard Kohr appeared before the House Committee on Appropriations' Foreign Operations subcommittee and requested that Israel receive $2.775 billion in military aid in fiscal year 2010, as called for in the 2007 Memorandum of Understanding between the U.S. and Israel that allocates $30 billion in aid for Israel over 10 years. Kohr said, "American assistance to Israel serves vital U.S. national security interests and advances critical U.S. foreign policy goals." The military hardware Israel must purchase to face the increased threat of terrorism and Islamist radicalism was increasingly expensive due to the recent spike in petroleum prices that had enabled countries such as Iran to augment their military budgets, according to Kohr.

=== The Iraq War ===
The day after George W. Bush addressed the United Nations General Assembly to call for action against Iraq, AIPAC told the Jewish Telegraphic Agency, "If the president asks Congress to support action in Iraq, AIPAC would lobby members of Congress to support him." John Judis wrote in The New Republic that although AIPAC lobbying was not widely reported to prevent Arab states from connecting Bush's war plans to Israel, Kohr called "'quietly' lobbying Congress to approve the use of force in Iraq" one of AIPAC's successes at a January 2003 AIPAC meeting. AIPAC spokesman Josh Block told The New Republic that AIPAC did no lobbying and that Kohr was misquoted. In The Washington Post, Dana Milbank and Glenn Frankel wrote that while AIPAC, like the Israeli government, officially had no position on the merits of going to war with Iraq, Bush administration officials were applauded at AIPAC events for defending the Iraq War. Jeffrey Goldberg reported in The New Yorker that AIPAC had lobbied Congress in favor of the war, but that Iraq was not one of its chief concerns. Ron Kampeas of JTA said that while AIPAC never explicitly supported or lobbied for the Iraq War, some in the pro-Israel community had seen the war as aligning the U.S. and Israel against Arab and Muslim radicalism. By the time of the 2007 AIPAC annual policy conference, continuing violence in Iraq had undermined that view, and at a conference session, the war was blamed for an increase in global terrorism.

=== Iran policy ===
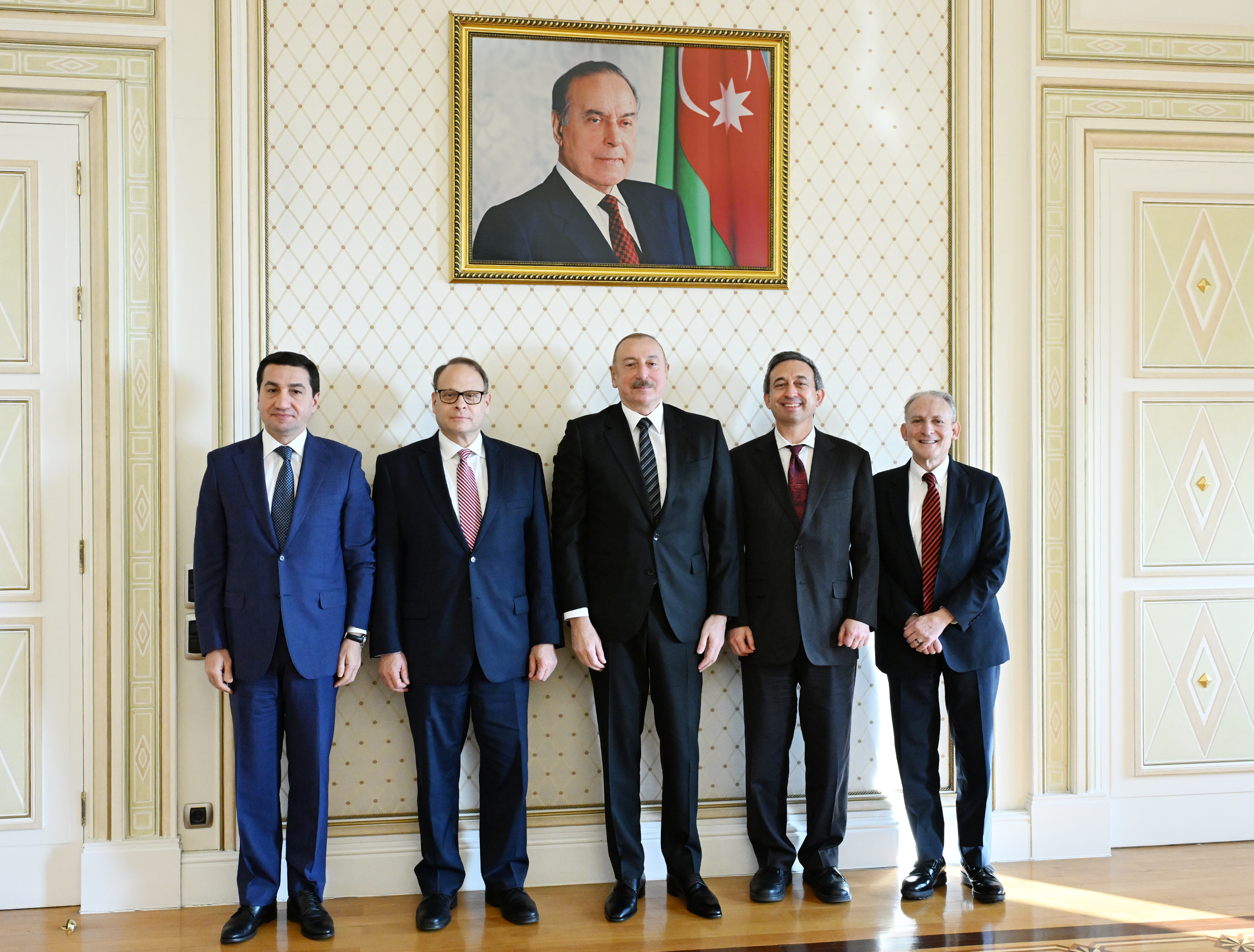
AIPAC leaders with Azerbaijan's President Ilham Aliyev in Baku, Azerbaijan, December 11, 2024

AIPAC's official position on Iran is to encourage a strong diplomatic and economic response coordinated by the U.S. government, its European allies, Russia, and China.

In 2012, AIPAC called for "crippling" sanctions on Iran in a letter to every member of Congress. In line with this approach, it lobbied to levy economic embargoes and increase sanctions on Iran (known as the Nuclear Weapon Free Iran Act of 2013). According to The New York Times, its effort "stalled after stiff resistance from President Obama."

AIPAC was a leading opponent of the Joint Comprehensive Plan of Action (JCPOA), the 2015 nuclear deal between Iran and the P5+1 powers. It mounted a major lobbying campaign against the agreement through a subsidiary group, Citizens for a Nuclear Free Iran, and reportedly spent between $20 million and $40 million on advertising, congressional meetings, and grassroots pressure. The campaign included television spots in nearly two dozen states, full-page newspaper ads, fly-ins of AIPAC members to Washington, and demonstrations at congressional offices. Despite this effort, described as one of the most intense lobbying periods in AIPAC's history, the Obama administration secured enough Senate support to sustain a veto of a resolution of disapproval, and the deal went into effect. In 2018, AIPAC supported the Trump administration's withdrawal from the JCPOA and backed the reimposition of sanctions on Iran.

On agriculture and agricultural trade, AIPAC lobbies for greater cooperation between the U.S. and Israel. It considers agriculture a key economic sector for economic cooperation between them.

== Structure and governance ==
=== Leadership and staff ===
Elliot Brandt was named CEO of AIPAC in late 2024. Brandt succeeded Howard Kohr, who had been CEO since 1996.

Before December 2025, AIPAC did not disclose details about its leadership. In December 2025, Democracy for the Arab World Now (DAWN) published a project titled "Faces of AIPAC", revealing the 50 people in charge of AIPAC. DAWN said in a statement, "As a tax-exempt nonprofit, AIPAC is subject to public disclosure requirements, which is precisely why accessibly identifying the individuals who govern and direct the organisation matters. However, nowhere on AIPAC's website, not even on the 'About Us' page, do the identities of these directors and officers appear."

In May 2026, DAWN released a report on AIPAC's current and former staff. The report found that many people who work for AIPAC also work for the Israeli and U.S. governments.

Based on public reporting, current and recent former members of the AIPAC Board of Directors include:

- Alan Franco
- Amy Friedkin
- Anita Friedman
- Bernie Kaminetsky
- Betsy Berns Korn
- Alan Levow
- Bob Pincus
- Bonnie Siegel
- Michael Tuchin
- David Victor

AIPAC presidents
| President | Date range | Short bio |
|---|---|---|
| Robert Asher | 1962–1964 | Lighting-fixtures dealer in Chicago |
| Larry Weinberg | 1976–1982 | Real-estate broker in Los Angeles and a former owner of the Portland Trail Blazers |
| Edward Levy Jr. | Ended 1988 | Building-supplies executive in Detroit |
| Mayer "Bubba" Mitchell | 1990–1992 | Real estate developer in Mobile, Alabama |
| David Steiner | Resigned 1992 | Construction and real estate executive |
| Steven Grossman | 1992–1996 | Communications executive and former Democratic Party chairman |
| Melvin Dow | Started 1996 | Houston attorney |
| Lonny Kaplan | 1998–2000 | New Jersey insurance executive |
| Tim Wuliger | Ended 2001 | Cleveland investor |
| Amy Friedkin | 2002–2004 | San Francisco, active in grassroots Jewish organisations |
| Bernice Manocherian | 2004–2006 | |
| Howard Friedman | 2006–2010 | |
| Lee Rosenberg | 2010–2012 | |
| Michael Kassen | 2012–2014 | |
| Robert Cohen | 2014–2016 | |
| Lillian Pinkus | 2016–2018 | |
| Mort Fridman | 2018–2020 | |
| Betsy Berns Korn | 2020–2023 | Former AIPAC vice president and former NFL employee |
| Bernie Kaminetsky | 2023–present | |

=== Operations and expenditures ===
As of early 2019, AIPAC had 17 regional and satellite offices and a headquarters on K Street in Washington, D.C. It spent $3.5 million on lobbying in 2018, a relatively large sum in the realm of foreign policy (more than 10 times J Street's lobbying expenditure), but less than many industry lobby groups, according to OpenSecrets, with the top 15 such groups in the US all spending over $15 million. It has also been noted that, simple dollar value comparisons aside, AIPAC has "a somewhat unique model" that often begins donating early in careers of politicians with "long-term promise". AIPAC also commits to spending on a variety of "less formal means of influence-peddling", such as luxury flights and accommodation for members of Congress. In addition to lobbying, AIPAC has affiliated political action committees that spend millions of dollars on political campaigns.

== American Israel Education Foundation ==
American Israel Education Foundation
- Founded: 1990
- Tax ID no.: 52-1623781
- Legal status: 501(c)(3) organization
- Revenue: $69,985,088 (2022-23)
- Expenses: $52,203,569 (2022-23)
- Endowment: $56,147,336
- Employees: 0 (2022)
- Volunteers: 20 (2022)
- Website: aiefdn.org

The American Israel Education Foundation is a sister organization of AIPAC, that handles educational work, rather than lobbying. It is a 501(c)(3) non-profit educational organization that conducts educational programs, including educational trips to Israel for members of the U.S. Congress and other American politicians.

AIEF trips for members of Congress occur every two years, becoming "the top spender on congressional travel" in those years. In August 2019, the foundation sponsored week-long trips with 72 members of Congress: 41 Democrats and 31 Republicans. They traveled to Israel and the West Bank and visited with Israeli prime minister Benjamin Netanyahu and Palestinian Authority President Mahmoud Abbas. Other educational activities include regular seminars for congressional staff.

Critics allege that these trips are propaganda rather than education and only offer the Israeli "side of the story" and that they violate ethics rules prohibiting lobbying groups from gifting personal travel to members of Congress. In 2025, former Representative Matt Gaetz spoke about a "downward pressure" on members of Congress to participate, particularly members of the Foreign Affairs, Armed Services, and Intelligence committees.

== Political action committee ==
American Israel Public Affairs Committee Political Action Committee
- Founded: 2021
- Registration no.: C00797670
- Legal status: Political Action Committee
- Location: Washington, DC
- Treasurer: Justin Phillips

Until 2021, AIPAC did not raise funds for political candidates itself. Its members raised money for candidates through political action committees unaffiliated with AIPAC and by other means. In late 2021, AIPAC formed its own political action committee, AIPAC PAC. It also announced plans for a Super PAC, the United Democracy Project, which can independently spend unlimited amounts to support or oppose a political candidate. In a letter about the move, AIPAC president Betsy Berns Korn wrote: "The DC political environment has been undergoing profound change. Hyperpartisanship, high congressional turnover and the exponential growth in the cost of campaigns now dominate the landscape." UCLA Younes & Soraya Nazarian Center for Israel Studies director Dov Waxman said, "Although for decades AIPAC has had informal ties with pro-Israel PACs, it has always refrained from forming its own PAC", adding, "I think its decision to establish its own PAC and super PAC is based on the recognition that campaign funding is a crucial means of exerting political influence in Congress, and that AIPAC now needs this tool in order to maintain its influence in Congress."

Former AIPAC executive director Tom Dine and legislative director Douglas Bloomfield criticized the move, saying it could call AIPAC's neutrality into question.

In March 2022, the PAC released its first endorsements of 130 candidates for the House of Representatives and Senate. The list included 37 members of Congress who had voted to overturn the 2020 election of Joe Biden. The endorsement drew criticism from various community figures and politicians. Former U.S. ambassador to Israel Daniel C. Kurtzer said it was "very disappointing that AIPAC has turned a blind eye to the damage that these people have done to our democracy", while Washington Post columnist Jennifer Rubin called it "truly horrifying". Additional criticism came from Council on Foreign Relations president Richard Haass, former Anti-Defamation League head Abe Foxman, and Jewish Democratic Council of America CEO Halie Soifer. In a "rare rebuke" from an Israeli official, Knesset member Alon Tal called the AIPAC endorsements "outrageous". AIPAC defended the endorsements, saying it was "no moment for the pro-Israel movement to become selective about its friends".

AIPAC's entrance into political campaigns came amid the erosion of bipartisan support for Israel in the U.S., with opinion polls showing growing criticism for the state among younger Democrats, including Jews, the breaking of the taboo on correlative comparisons between Israel's treatment of Palestinians and apartheid South Africa, and rising support for the Boycott, Divestment and Sanctions (BDS) movement.

=== United Democracy Project ===
United Democracy Project
- Abbreviation: UDP
- Formation: January 3, 2022; 4 years ago
- Type: Super PAC
- Registration no.: C00799031
- Region served: United States
- Treasurer: Christopher D'Alessio
- Revenue: 87,176,557 USD (January 2023-December 2024)
- Website: uniteddemocracyproject.org

In 2021, AIPAC launched its own Super PAC, the "United Democracy Project" (UDP), which supports pro-Israel candidates in both primary and general election cycles.

During the 2022 cycle, UDP spent $2.3 million in opposition to state representative Summer Lee in the primary for Pennsylvania's 12th congressional district. Lee has supported setting conditions for U.S. aid to Israel and accused Israel of atrocities in Gaza, comparing its actions to the treatment of young black men in the U.S. UDP also spent $2 million in the primary for North Carolina's 4th congressional district to support state senator Valerie Foushee against Nida Allam, the first Muslim American woman to hold elected office in North Carolina and the political director for Bernie Sanders's 2016 presidential campaign. Both candidates were endorsed by The Squad—progressive U.S. Representatives Alexandria Ocasio-Cortez, Ilhan Omar, and Rashida Tlaib. UDP spent an estimated $280,000 to support incumbent Shontel Brown in Ohio's 11th congressional district over her primary challenger, progressive Nina Turner.

UDP spent $1.2 million to help the incumbent congressman for Texas's 28th congressional district, Henry Cuellar, fend off a challenge from Jessica Cisneros, a 28-year-old immigration lawyer endorsed by the Squad. After Amnesty International and Human Rights Watch released a report accusing Israel of imposing apartheid, Cuellar said, "These inaccuracies incite antisemitic behavior" and decried what he called "dangerous effects of falsified name-calling".

J Street spokesperson Logan Bayroff has called AIPAC "a Republican front organization" that tries "to persuade Democratic voters who they should support". He added: "The United Democracy Project sounds innocuous ... but the reason that they're aligning with certain candidates is because they are more aligned with their more hawkish positions on Israel".

In March 2024, with reports of AIPAC and UDP planning to spend $100 million to primary incumbent progressive House Democrats, opponents formed the Reject AIPAC coalition "to protect democracy & Palestinian rights". Founding members include Democratic Socialists of America (DSA), Gen-Z for Change, IfNotNow, Justice Democrats, National Iranian American Council, Our Revolution, Progressive Democrats of America (PDA), RootsAction, Sunrise Movement, and the Working Families Party.

In April 2024, The Guardian reported that ahead of the 2024 elections, AIPAC was leading a handful of pro-Israel groups to target candidates critical of Israel (mainly Democrats) and had planned to spend tens of millions of dollars.

In 2026, AIPAC (via UDP) directly spent at least $5 million, with some individual AIPAC donors providing at least an additional $8.7 million, to influence four March Democratic congressional primary elections in Illinois, funneled through shell super PACs Elect Chicago Women, Affordable Chicago Now!, and Chicago Progressive Partnership. Of the four candidates they backed, Donna Miller and Melissa Bean won their races, while Melissa Conyears Ervin (the only one of the four to also receive direct funding from UDP) and Laura Fine lost. Their spending was timed so that, while several links between the shell PACs and AIPAC publicly existed, their donors' identities (including direct funding from AIPAC) would not have to be disclosed until after the elections; AIPAC did not confirm its involvement in the three shell PACs until after the elections.

The previous month, UDP spent $2 million attacking former congressman Tom Malinowski, considered the front-runner in the Democratic primary for a New Jersey congressional special election, after he opposed providing unconditional aid to Israel even while expressing support for Israel and having been previously endorsed by AIPAC; progressive activist Analilia Mejia, who was significantly more critical of Israel, narrowly won the nomination, leading to backlash toward AIPAC from some more centrist Democrats. UDP spent $2 million against Aisha Wahab in the 2026 California's 14th congressional district special election.

A June 2026 New York Times article reported that UDP had a war chest of nearly $100 million for the 2026 election cycle. The article cited Democratic congressional candidate Daniel Biss, who said polling in his district found that 51% of Democratic voters viewed AIPAC unfavorably and 17% viewed it favorably. After UDP spent millions of dollars backing one of his opponents, Biss highlighted AIPAC's role in the race in a TV ad and later said the strategy helped him win the primary. UDP spent $5.7 million to support Adrian Boafo to represent Maryland's 5th congressional district in 2026.

In the 2026 elections, the AIPAC PAC was permitted to contribute up to $5,000 per election to a candidate, while UDP, as a Super PAC, could spend unlimited amounts to support or oppose federal candidates. According to an analysis by FactCheck.org, by June 2026, UDP had raised about $104 million and spent about $52.5 million during the 2026 election cycle. The activities of these groups were also noted in the Republican primaries. UDP spent over $3 million opposing Thomas Massie in Kentucky's Republican primary and supporting his challenger, Ed Gallrein. The race was one of the most expensive House primaries. UDP and AIPAC spent $5.5 million in support of Wesley Bell and against Cori Bush in 2026. UDP spent $30.6 million during the Democratic primary to support Haley Stevens and oppose Abdul El-Sayed.

On October 22, 2026, AIPAC decided to end direct support for candidates and financial contributions through its PACs, but electoral activity will continue through its affiliated Super PAC, the "United Democracy Project." The United Democracy Project will be permitted to raise unlimited funds to support pro-Israel candidates and oppose critics of Israel. This decision was made following increasing opposition to this organization and changing American public opinion toward Israel. However, this strategic shift does not mean that AIPAC is abandoning its efforts to influence US elections, but rather that it is simply changing the methods and mechanisms through which it exerts its influence. AIPAC spokesperson Darren Sosa also announced that these changes do not affect the group's mission and purpose, and that our financial contributions to candidates will continue.

AIPAC's super PAC and other groups spent $55 million on candidates who lost in the 2026 midterm elections, with the largest part of that, about $32 million, spent to defeat Abdul El-Sayed, the Democratic senator-elect from Michigan. The results were one of AIPAC's worst recent performances and showed that the US-Israeli war against Iran, which contributed to rising living costs, had a significant impact on voters. After the 2026 elections, AIPAC claimed victory, writing on the social media platform X that "more than 234 candidates supported by AIPAC members" had won their elections. It did not name these candidates.

=== National Black Empowerment Action Fund ===
National Black Empowerment Action Fund
- Formation: 2022; 4 years ago
- Type: 501(c)(4)
- Tax ID no.: 88-2990150
- Headquarters: Atlanta, Georgia
- President: Richard St. Paul
- Website: nbeaf.org

In 2022, AIPAC veteran and former Michael Bloomberg 2020 presidential campaign manager Darius Jones founded the "National Black Empowerment Action Fund" (NBEAF) with funding from AIPAC and Daniel S. Loeb. NBEAF is led by Richard St. Paul, a member of AIPAC's National Council. In 2024, NBEF supported primary candidates against pro-Palestinian Black incumbents Jamaal Bowman and Cori Bush. Westchester Black Political Conference questioned NBEAF's claims about Bowman, arguing that the group advocates for Israel, not Black people.

In 2025, NBEAF spent $1.3 million on messaging critical of Zohran Mamdani. In 2026, NBEAF spent "hundreds of thousands of dollars" supporting Wesley Bell against Cori Bush and at least $30,000 on ads against Rashida Tlaib.

== Political influence and reception ==
AIPAC has been compared to firearms, banking, defense, and energy lobbies as "long a feature of politics in Washington". Its promotional literature notes that the Leadership Reception during its annual Policy Conference "will be attended by more members of Congress than almost any other event, except for a joint session of Congress or a State of the Union address." The New York Times has called AIPAC "a major force in shaping United States policy in the Middle East" that can push bills through Congress that "typically [...] pass by unanimous votes." In 1997, Fortune magazine named AIPAC the second-most powerful influence group in Washington, D.C.

Former congressman Brian Baird, who said he "had admired Israel since I was a kid" but became alienated from AIPAC, said, "When key votes are cast, the question on the House floor, troublingly, is often not 'What is the right thing to do for the United States of America?' but 'How is AIPAC going to score this?'" He cited a 2009 House resolution he opposed condemning the Goldstone Report on civilian deaths. "When we had the vote, I said, 'We have member after member coming to the floor to vote on a resolution they've never read, about a report they've never seen, in a place they've never been.'" Baird said he worried that AIPAC members and supporters believe that they're "supporting Israel" when they are "actually backing policies", such as the killing of civilians in Gaza, "that are antithetical to its highest values and, ultimately, destructive for the country".

A criticism of AIPAC's proposal for tougher sanctions on Iran is that the primary incentive P5+1 negotiators can give Iran to stop its nuclear program is reducing the sanctions that have harmed Iran's economy. By imposing even harsher sanctions on Iran, AIPAC takes this chip away. According to a "senior" Obama administration official, the administration told AIPAC leadership that its tougher sanctions on Iran "would blow up the negotiations—the Iranians would walk away from the table". The official asked them, "Why do you know better than we do what strengthens our hand? Nobody involved in the diplomacy thinks that." A former congressional staffer told journalist Connie Bruck, "What was striking was how strident the message was" from AIPAC. "'How could you not pass a resolution that tells the President what the outcome of the negotiations has to be?'"

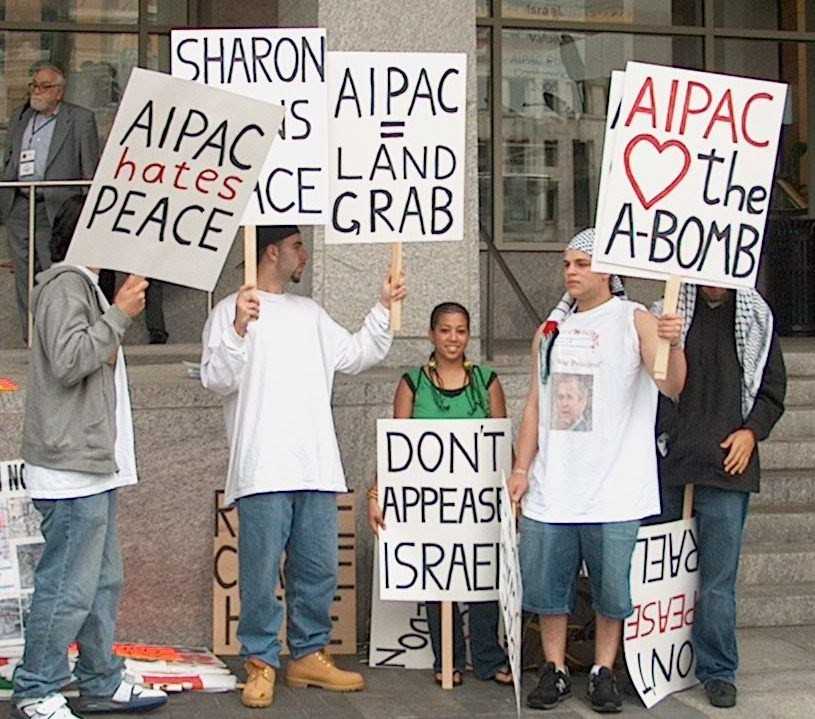
Protesters at AIPAC conference in Washington, D.C., May 2005

Critics have argued that AIPAC does not properly represent American Jews who support Israel and supportive only of right-wing Israeli policy and viewpoints. A Pew Research Center survey in 2013 found that only 38% of U.S. Jews believe the Israeli government is sincerely pursuing peace and 44% believe construction of new settlements damages Israel's national security. AIPAC has been accused of being strongly allied with Israel's Likud party and the U.S. Republican Party. An AIPAC spokesman has called this a "malicious mischaracterization".

Among the best-known critical works about AIPAC is The Israel Lobby and U.S. Foreign Policy, by University of Chicago professor John Mearsheimer and Harvard Kennedy School professor Stephen Walt. In the working paper and resulting book, they accuse AIPAC of being "the most powerful and best known" component of a larger pro-Israel lobby that distorts American foreign policy. They write:

[AIPAC's] success is due to its ability to reward legislators and congressional candidates who support its agenda, and to punish those who challenge it. ... AIPAC makes sure that its friends get strong financial support from the many pro-Israel political action committees. Anyone who is seen as hostile to Israel can be sure that AIPAC will direct campaign contributions to his or her political opponents. ... The bottom line is that AIPAC, a de facto agent for a foreign government, has a stranglehold on Congress, with the result that US policy towards Israel is not debated there, even though that policy has important consequences for the entire world.

AIPAC has also been the subject of criticism by prominent politicians, including Democrats J. William Fulbright, Dave Obey, and Mike Gravel, and Republicans John Hostettler and Thomas Massie.

Democratic congressman Jim Moran has been a vocal critic of AIPAC, causing national controversy in 2007 and drawing criticism from many Jewish groups after he told Tikkun that AIPAC had been "pushing the [Iraq War] from the beginning" and that "I don't think they represent the mainstream of American Jewish thinking at all, but because they are so well organized, and their members are extraordinarily powerful—most of them are quite wealthy—they have been able to exert power." Conservative columnist Jennifer Rubin called AIPAC's membership "overwhelmingly Democratic".

In 2020, U.S. Representative Betty McCollum accused AIPAC of hate speech and said the group is a hate group.

In 2020, Senator Bernie Sanders said AIPAC provides a platform for bigotry and opposition to Palestinian rights, and said he would not attend its conference. In February 2023, on CBS Face the Nation, Sanders said that AIPAC, formerly bipartisan, had begun attempting to "destroy" the American progressive movement.

The Israeli documentary film The Kings of Capitol Hill features interviews with former and current AIPAC personalities and depicts how AIPAC has moved toward the political right wing and away from political positions most American Jews hold.

== Controversies ==
Former U.S. Senator William Fulbright, in the 1970s, and former senior CIA official Victor Marchetti, in the 1980s, contended that AIPAC should have registered under the Foreign Agents Registration Act (FARA). FARA requires those who receive funds or act on behalf of a foreign government to register as foreign agents. AIPAC says it is a registered U.S. lobbying group, funded by private donations, and that it receives "no financial assistance" from Israel or any other foreign group.

In 2006, U.S. Representative Betty McCollum demanded an apology from AIPAC, claiming an AIPAC representative had called her vote against the Palestinian Anti-Terrorism Act of 2006 "support for terrorists". McCollum said she would not allow AIPAC representatives in her office until she received a written apology for the comment. AIPAC disputed McCollum's claim, and McCollum has since declared the incident over.

=== Steiner resignation ===
In 1992, AIPAC president David Steiner was forced to resign after he was recorded boasting about his political influence in obtaining aid for Israel. Steiner also said he had "met with [then U.S. Secretary of State] Jim Baker and I cut a deal with him. I got—besides the $3 billion, you know they're looking for the Jewish votes, and I'll tell him whatever he wants to hear [...] Besides the $10 billion in loan guarantees, which was a fabulous thing, $3 billion in foreign, in military aid, and I got almost a billion dollars in other goodies that people don't even know about." Steiner also said he was "negotiating" with the incoming Clinton administration over whom Clinton would appoint as secretary of state and secretary of the National Security Agency. He said AIPAC had "a dozen people in [the Clinton] campaign, in the headquarters... in Little Rock, and they're all going to get big jobs."

New York real estate developer Haim Katz told The Washington Times that he taped the conversation because "as someone Jewish, I am concerned when a small group has a disproportionate power. I think that hurts everyone, including Jews. If David Steiner wants to talk about the incredible, disproportionate clout AIPAC has, the public should know about it."

=== Spying allegations ===
In April 2005, AIPAC policy director Steve J. Rosen and AIPAC senior Iran analyst Keith Weissman were fired by AIPAC amid an FBI investigation into whether they passed classified U.S. information received from Lawrence Franklin on to the government of Israel. They were later indicted for illegally conspiring to gather and disclose classified national security information to Israel. AIPAC agreed to pay the legal fees for Weissman's defense through appeal if necessary.

In May 2005, the Justice Department announced that Lawrence Anthony Franklin, a U.S. Air Force Reserves colonel working as a Department of Defense analyst at the Pentagon in the office of Douglas Feith, had been arrested and charged by the FBI with providing classified national defense information to Israel. The six-count criminal complaint identified AIPAC by name and described a luncheon meeting in which, allegedly, Franklin disclosed top-secret information to two AIPAC officials.

Franklin pleaded guilty to passing government secrets to Rosen and Weissman and revealed for the first time that he also gave classified information directly to an Israeli government official in Washington. On January 20, 2006, he was sentenced to 151 months (almost 13 years) in prison and fined $10,000. As part of the plea agreement, Franklin agreed to cooperate in the larger federal investigation. All charges against the former AIPAC employees were dropped in 2009.

=== Financing pro-Israel Democrats in 2022 ===
Having endorsed over 100 Republican members of Congress who had voted against certifying Biden's election, AIPAC spent $24 million, via its PAC, the UDP, to defeat candidates not considered pro-Israel enough in the 2022 Democratic primaries. Trump campaign financiers such as Paul Singer, Bernie Marcus, and Haim Saban made substantial contributions. It spent $4 million to support Haley Stevens and defeat Congressman Andy Levin, who was critical of AIPAC's support for hardline Israeli policies. It spent $7 million to defeat the favorite in a Maryland July primary, Donna Edwards, who had failed to back resolutions in support of Israel during the 2012 Gaza War. Several AIPAC supporters have called reports on AIPAC's spending against candidates critical of Israel's policies "antisemitic".

=== Alleged complicity with antisemitism ===
Critics have alleged that AIPAC is antisemitic, complicit in antisemitism, or silent about antisemitism from Donald Trump and other right-wing politicians. In The Nation, Eva Borgwardt criticized AIPAC for alleged complicity with antisemitism, writing that it "has welcomed Trump—and his top donors—with open arms, while refusing to condemn his blatantly antisemitic remarks."

In August 2022, AIPAC tweeted: "George Soros has a long history of backing anti-Israel groups...Now he's giving $1 million to help @jstreetdotorg support anti-Israel candidates and attack pro-Israel Democrats. AIPAC works to strengthen pro-Israel mainstream Democrats. J Street & Soros work to undermine them." In response, the left-wing Jewish organization IfNotNow denounced AIPAC for antisemitism, tweeting, "AIPAC is the antisemitic far right...They are not a Jewish org, nor claim to be one."

== See also ==
- Americans for Peace Now
- Conference of Presidents of Major American Jewish Organizations
- European Leadership Network (ELNET)
- Public diplomacy of Israel
- Israel lobby in the United States
- National Jewish Democratic Council
- Republican Jewish Coalition
- Washington Institute for Near East Policy
- White House Jewish Liaison
- Zionist Organization of America
