= Howard Kohr =

American lobbyist

Howard Kohr is an American lobbyist who served as CEO of the American Israel Public Affairs Committee (AIPAC) from 1996 to 2024. Kohr is credited with overseeing growth of the organization's institutional footprint, fundraising, and institutional reach.

== Early life and education ==
Kohr was the son of Kurt Kohr, a Vienna-born Holocaust survivor who was held in Dachau concentration camp.

Kohr was raised in Cleveland Heights, Ohio, graduating from Cleveland Heights High School in 1974. He attended Kenyon College.

== Career ==
Following the June 1993 resignation of AIPAC's executive director Thomas Dine after his usage of racial slurs against Orthodox Jews, Kohr, then managing director, became the lobbying firm's interim executive director.

In 2015, Kohr announced AIPAC's opposition to the Obama Administration's Joint Comprehensive Plan of Action without the joint dismantling of Iran's nuclear infrastructure.

In March 2024, Kohr announced he would step down as AIPAC's CEO on December 31, 2024. Kohr was succeeded by Elliot Brandt.
