= Michael Tuchin =

American lawyer and lobbyist

Michael Lloyd Tuchin is an American lawyer and lobbyist, serving as the Board Chair of the of American Israel Public Affairs Committee (AIPAC) and founding member of KTBS Law LLP, formerly known as Klee, Tuchin, Bogdanoff & Stern LLP, a business reorganization law firm based in Los Angeles.

== Early life and education ==
Tuchin attended Stanford University, graduating with a bachelor's degree in psychology. He later attended Boalt Hall School of Law at the University of California, Berkeley, graduating with a J.D. in 1990.

== Career ==
Tuchin specializes in bankruptcy law, and is a past president and board member of both the Los Angeles Bankruptcy Forum and the Financial Lawyers Conference of Los Angeles. He is an editor of the California Bankruptcy Journal.

In November 2011, Tuchin was named as one of five finance chairs for Texas Governor Rick Perry's presidential campaign in California.

=== AIPAC ===
In November 2023, Tuchin's home in the Brentwood neighborhood of Los Angeles was the site of a protest where protesters ignited smoke devices in the street and smeared fake blood on Tuchin's property. The protest was subsequently investigated as a hate crime.

In November 2023, Tuchin led an AIPAC leadership delegation to Israel to meet with Prime Minister Benjamin Netanyahu.

In December 2025, Tuchin hosted a fundraiser for Illinois's 9th Congressional District democratic candidate Laura Fine at his Los Angeles law office. Fine had previously said she was not seeking AIPAC's endorsement.
