= Elliot Brandt =

American lobbyist

Chief Executive Officer of AIPAC
- Incumbent
- Assumed office 2024
- Preceded by: Howard Kohr

Personal details
- Education: Stanford University
- Occupation: Lobbyist

Elliot Brandt is an American lobbyist who has been the CEO of the American Israel Public Affairs Committee (AIPAC) since 2024.

== Early life and education ==
As a child, Brandt wrote to President Ronald Reagan to advocate against US arms sales to Saudi Arabia.

Brandt attended Stanford University, graduating in 1990.

== Career ==
Brandt joined AIPAC in 1994 in the Pacific Northwest office.

In 2002, Brandt was named Western States director for AIPAC. In 2014, he was named managing director of AIPAC.

In June 2024, Brandt was named CEO of AIPAC, succeeding Howard Kohr.

In 2025, Brandt was named one of Washington DC’s 500 Most Influential People of 2025 by Washingtonian magazine.
