= M. J. Rosenberg =

American commentator

Michael Jay "M.J." Rosenberg (born May 4, 1952) is an American commentator on the Middle East.

== Career ==
Rosenberg worked for the American Israel Public Affairs Committee (AIPAC) from 1982 to 1986, and wrote the group's weekly newsletter, Near East Report.

Prior to this, he worked on Capitol Hill for 15 years for various Democratic members of the House and Senate.

From 1998 to 2009, Rosenberg was director of policy at the Israel Policy Forum (IPF). He also published a popular blog on Talking Points Memo's TPMCafé. According to Nick Bunzl, IPF executive director at the time of his departure, Rosenberg was one of their most widely read columnists and bloggers, and that his signature provocative style pushed the conversation in much needed directions.

Between 2009 and 2012, Rosenberg worked for Media Matters for America. He left the position after a confrontation with Alan Dershowitz, who objected to Rosenberg's use of the term "Israel Firster." Dershowitz threatened to embarrass MMFA if Rosenberg remained at the organization.
