= Tom Dine =

American lobbyist

Thomas A. Dine (born 29 February 1940, Cincinnati, Ohio) was a senior policy advisor at Israel Policy Forum (IPF), assisting with policy, programming, and development decision-making in the Washington office. Dine was chief executive officer of the Jewish Community Federation of San Francisco, president of Radio Free Europe/Radio Liberty in Prague, and Assistant Administrator for Europe and the New Independent States of Eurasia at USAID.

Most notably, he was the executive director of the American Israel Public Affairs Committee (AIPAC) from 1980 through 1993. Alhurra, a US-based public Arabic-language TV channel, has hired Dine as a consultant.

== Early life ==
Dine was educated at Colgate University (B.A.) in 1962, the University of California in Los Angeles (M.A.) and Johns Hopkins University (M.A.).

Dine was also a Peace Corps volunteer in the Philippines from 1962 through 1964. He was also a Senior Analyst for the United States Senate Special Committee on National Emergencies and Delegated Powers from 1973 through 1974. Following this, he worked for the Senate Budget Committee in 1975 through 1978. In 1979 through 1980, he was an advisor to Senator Edmund Muskie on the nuclear weapons policy and the Strategic Arms Limitation Talks, as well as a defense and foreign policy advisor to Senator Edward M. Kennedy.

== Career ==
Dine came to prominence as Executive Director of AIPAC in 1980 through 1993. His work with AIPAC involved extensive lobbying across the US Administration and the Congress. He played a main role, for example, in lobbying different branches of the US government in early 1986 over a US arms deal with Saudi Arabia.

In 1993 through 1997, he worked for the U.S. Agency for International Development, as the Assistant Administrator for Europe and the New Independent States (NIS). Subsequently, he was the longest serving director of Radio Free Europe (based in Prague). He left this position in November 2005 to become Chief Executive Officer of the Jewish Community Federation of San Francisco.

In April 2013, Dine was one of 100 prominent American Jews who sent a letter to Israeli Prime Minister Benjamin Netanyahu urging him to "work closely" with Secretary of State John Kerry "to devise pragmatic initiatives, consistent with Israel's security needs, which would represent Israel's readiness to make painful territorial sacrifices for the sake of peace."

Dine is a member of Prague Society for International Cooperation, an NGO whose main goals are networking and the development of a new generation of responsible, well-informed leaders and thinkers.

== Personal life ==
Dine is married and has two children. He is also the brother of the pop artist Jim Dine.
