= Anabela Sousa Rodrigues =

Portuguese politician

Member of the Assembly of the Republic of Portugal
- In office 30 March 2022 – 25 March 2024
- In office 25 October 2019 – 28 March 2022
- Constituency: Viana do Castelo

Member of the Valença City Council
- In office 16 October 2013 – 18 October 2021

Personal details
- Born: 9 August 1972 (age 54)
- Party: Socialist Party
- Occupation: Politician; psychologist

Anabela de Jesus Sousa Rodrigues (European Portuguese: [ɐ.nɐˈbɛ.lɐ dɨ ʒɨˈzuʃ ˈso(w).zɐ ʁuˈdɾi.ɡɨʃ]; born 9 October 1972) is a Portuguese politician and psychologist. From 2019 to 2024, she was a member of the Assembly of the Republic of Portugal, representing the Viana do Castelo. From 2013 to 2021, she was a member of the city council of Valença in the district of Viana do Castelo in Portugal.

== Biography ==
Anabela Sousa Rodrigues was born on 9 October 1972. She graduated from the Faculty of Psychology and Education Science of the University of Porto with a master's degree in psychology, and has worked as a psychologist.

Sousa Rodrigues belongs to the Socialist Party. From 16 October 2013 to 18 October 2021, she was a member of the city council of Valença in the district of Viana do Castelo in Portugal. Sousa Rodrigues unsuccessfully run for the office of the president of the Valença City Council on the Socialist Party electoral list in the 2017 election. She was also a leader of the Valença division of the Socialist Party.

Sousa Rodrigues was elected to the Assembly of the Republic of Portugal in the 2019 election in the constituency of Viana do Castelo. She unsuccessfully run for the reelection in the 2022 election. Sousa Rodrigues was appointed to the assembly on 30 March 2022, replacing Tiago Brandão Rodrigues, who resigned from the office. She remained a member of the assembly until 25 March 2024.
