= Carlos Silva e Sousa =

Portuguese politician (1957–2018)

Member of Parliament
- In office 2011–2015

Personal details
- Born: 13 April 1957 Olhão, Portugal
- Died: 22 February 2018 (aged 60)
- Party: Social Democratic Party
- Occupation: Lawyer, MP, consul and mayor

Carlos Eduardo da Silva e Sousa (13 April 1957 – 22 February 2018) was a Portuguese lawyer, consul, mayor and member of parliament.

== Biography ==
Carlos Silva e Sousa was born on 13 April 1957. in the town of Olhão, Portugal. He graduated from the Faculty of Law at the University of Lisbon.

His primary profession was as a lawyer, and he held various positions within the Order of Attorneys in the Faro District. He also worked as a farmer, managing Quinta dos Correias, known for its wine production. He served as the president of the Confraternity of Wine and Gastronomy Enthusiasts of the Algarve and the Board of Farmers of the Irrigation Perimeter of Várzea de Benaciate. Additionally, he worked as a Consul of Lithuania and as the Vice-Consul of São Tomé and Príncipe for the Algarve.

Carlos Silva e Sousa was a Member of Parliament in the Assembly of the Republic for approximately four years, from June 2011 to November 2015, during the XII Legislature. He was affiliated with the Social Democratic Party, serving on the National Council and as the president of the Albufeira municipal delegation and vice-president of the district delegation. He also presided over the Municipal Assembly of Albufeira for three terms and was later elected as the mayor of the municipality. In October 2017, he was reelected for a second term but died during that term in 2018.

On 22 February 2018 he was one of the local officials who signed a joint declaration to end hydrocarbon exploration on the national coast. He was succeeded by José Carlos Rolo.

Carlos Silva e Sousa died from a heart attack on 22 February 2018 at his residence at the age of 60.
