= Law of Portugal =

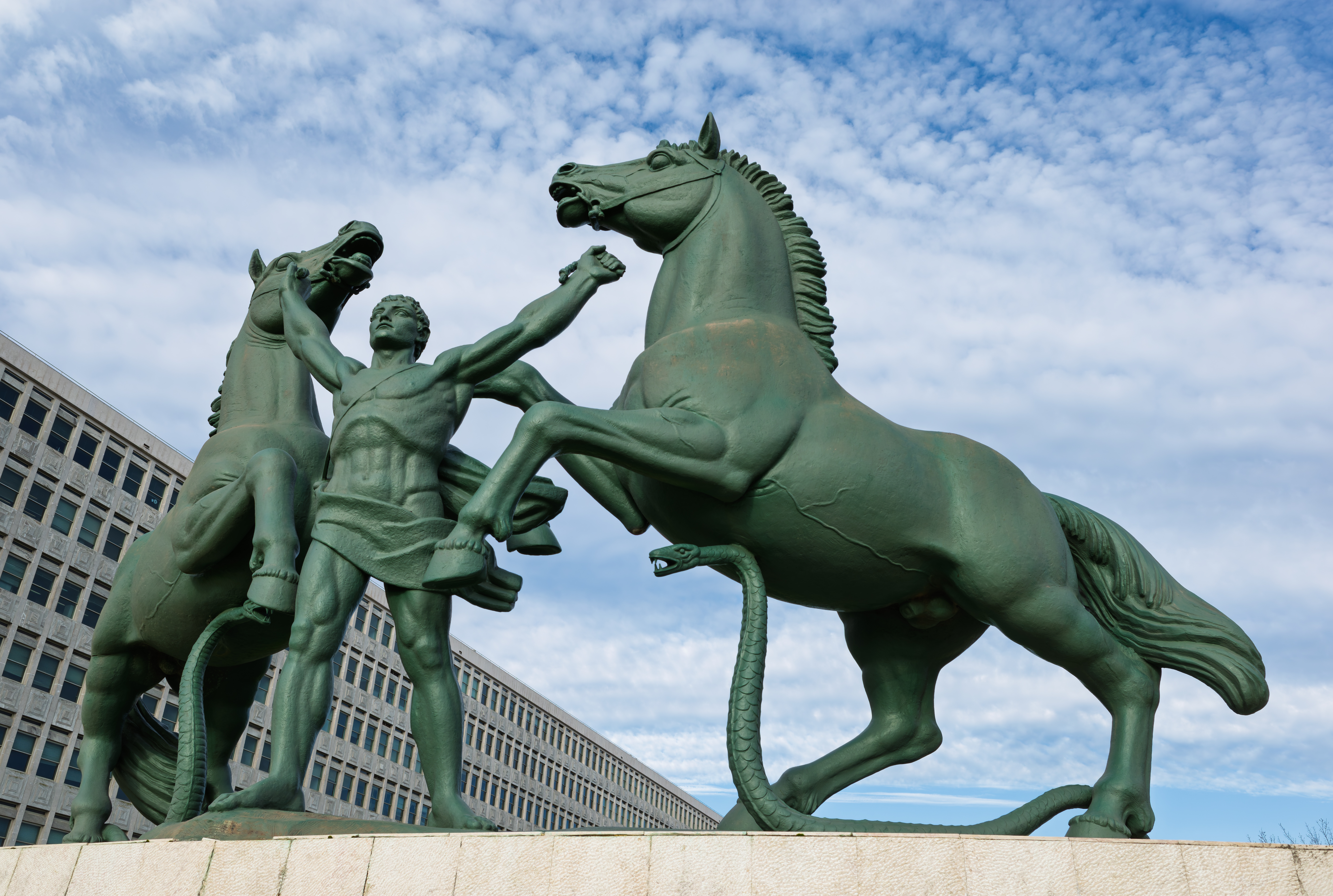
Allegory of law, at the Palace of Justice of Lisbon

The Law of Portugal is part of the family of what in English-speaking countries are sometimes called the "civil law" legal systems, referring to legal systems that developed at least in conversation or close ties with systems influenced by the ius commune medieval European tradition of Roman law (however, Scandinavian legal systems are often counted as such, despite the former not penetrating in influence, as opposed to local North Germanic customary law). As such, it has many common features with the legal systems found in most of the countries in Continental Europe.

Along its history, the law practiced in Portugal started to be based in the customary law of the indigenous peoples that initially occupied the region, that was later influenced by the Roman and Visigothic laws. From the 13th until the 18th centuries, the main influence was the Justinian and Canon laws. In the 18th century, the main influence started to be the natural law.

In the 19th century, the French civil law was the main influence in the Law of Portugal. However, since the early 20th century, the major influence has been the German civil law. This growing of the Germanistic influence was mainly driven by works on civil law developed by legal theorists of the University of Coimbra under the leadership of professor Guilherme Alves Moreira, who published his decisive Instituições de Direito Civil from 1906 to 1916. European Union law is now a major driving force in many respects, such as corporate law, administrative law and civil procedure.

The Law of Portugal is the basis or, at least, influences more or less sharply the legal systems of the several countries of the Community of Portuguese Language Countries and of some other territories that were once part of the Portuguese Empire. Therefore, these legal systems share many common features which, occasionally, makes them to be considered as a separate branch (Lusophone Legal System) in the scope of the wider family of civil law legal systems.

The main Portuguese laws include the Constitution (1976, as amended), the Civil Code (1966, as amended), the Penal Code (1982, as amended), the Labor Code (2003, as amended) and the Commercial Societies Code (1986, as amended). The Commercial Code (1888, as amended) and the Administrative Code (1945, as amended) used to have a high importance in the past, but are now largely obsolete and partially replaced by new legislation.

== History ==
As in most other European medieval countries, Portugal did not have centralized political institutions that would enact statutory law on an everyday basis. Both the wars against Castile and the Reconquista turned the Crown and the Court into an army permanently on the move. Some Portuguese legal historians claim that in the first two centuries after the Treaty of Zamora in 1143—in which the León recognized Portuguese de facto sovereignty—the kingdom's political power was that of a "Warrior-State" that neither could, nor did, direct its resources to the organization of administrative institutions or to the productions of laws.

An exception to this fact were the three laws enacted by King Afonso II in 1211 during the Cortes of Coimbra.

During most of Portuguese legal history, Portugal and its colonies had an ancient legal system based on a double foundation of medieval local customary law and Roman law, mostly derived from the Corpus iuris civilis.

What would be the Portuguese law has its roots in the laws that were applied in the Far Western region of Europe that would become Portugal. These included the customary law of the Indo-European and Celtic peoples that originally lived in the area (including the Lusitanians and the Gallaecians), the Roman law applied after the annexation of the region by the Roman Empire, the German law introduced by the Germanic invaders (including the Visigoths and Suebi) and the Canon law applied after the adoption of the Christianity and the increased influence of the Church.

After the establishment of independent Kingdom of Portugal in 1143, the historical evolution of its law can be generically divided in the following periods:

1. 12th–13th century – Use of the customary and custumal law, with a strong Roman, Germanic and Canonical influence;
2. 13th–15th century – Roman-Byzantine (Corpus iuris civilis) and Canon-derived law;
3. 15th–18th century – Roman-Byzantine and Canon derived law, compiled in the Ordinances;
4. 18th century to 1832 – Introduction of the natural law and the increasing influence of the Liberalism;
5. 1832–1926 – Strong influence the liberalism and individualism and introduction of the codification of the law;
6. 1926–1974 – Strong influence of corporatism;
7. Since 1974 – Modern era, with socialism influence, latter tilted to the Neoliberal and European law influence.

=== Ordinances ===
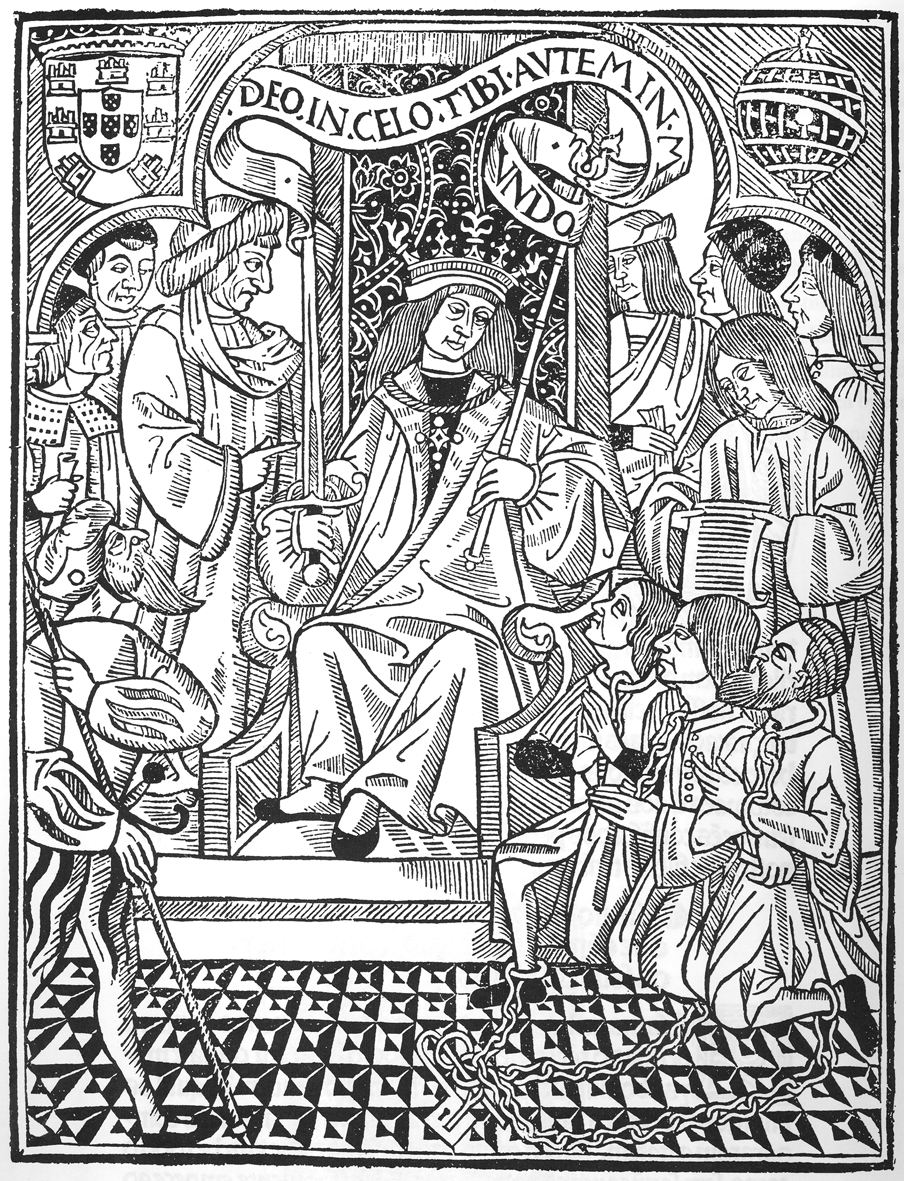
King Manuel I exercising justice, in a woodcut from the 1514 edition of the Manueline Ordinances.

However, following the 1383–85 Crisis, the beginning of the age of Portuguese Discoveries and the establishment and growing of the overseas empire, the Kings of Portugal were able to grow politically stronger.

This strength allowed the centralization of power and an increase of legal authority of the central State. One of the expressions of this authority was the creation of compilations of laws in use in the Kingdom referred as the "Ordinances" (Ordenações). These attempts to codify the law were not only a way to unify and bring together the local legal traditions from the whole Kingdom, but also to correct some customs that the Crown thought were unreasonable.

The first of these ordinances was created by the initiative of King Edward, under the lead of Doctor of Law Rui Fernandes. Their first draft was presented in 1446, but they were only definitively reviewed and approved in 1454, already in the reign of Afonso V, so becoming known as the Alfonsine Ordinances (Ordenações Afonsinas).

These ordinances included:

- Alfonsine Ordinances, 1446 (formally approved 1454) – under King Edward and Duke Peter of Coimbra (regent in the name of King Afonso V, while he was a minor);
- Manueline Ordinances (Ordenações Manuelinas), 1512–1520 – under King Manuel I. They were modified in 1526, 1533 and 1580;
- Philippine Ordinances (Ordenações Filipinas), 1603 – under King Philip II. As these were established during the period of the Iberian Union, they were influenced by Spanish law.

The ordinances of 1603 continued to be used in Portugal and throughout the Portuguese Empire until the first Portuguese Civil Code came into force in 1867. In Brazil, they continued to be in force after independence in 1822 and constituted the framework of civil law until 1916, when the first Brazilian Civil Code was introduced.

=== The process of codification ===
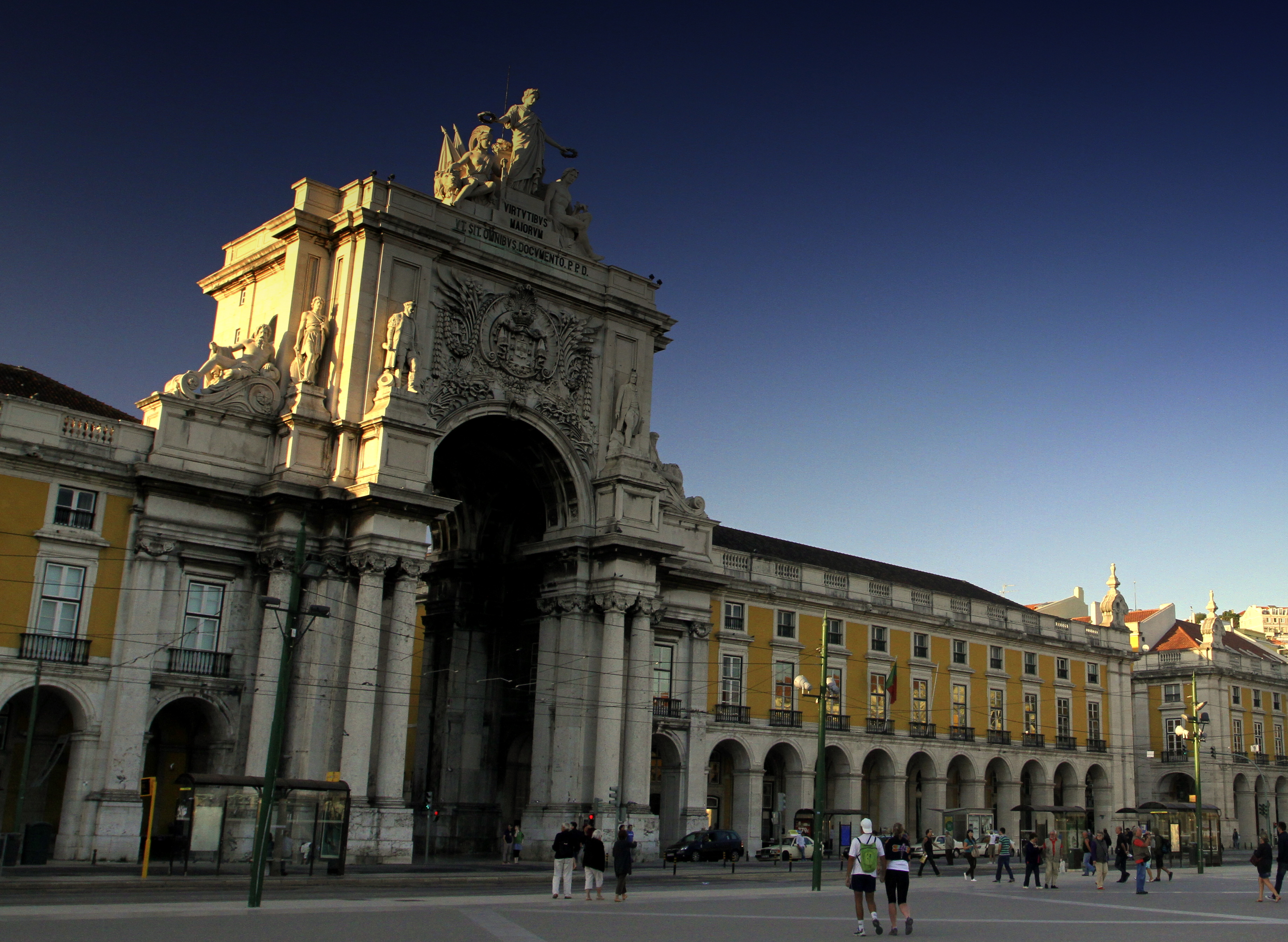
The seat of the Supreme Court of Justice at Terreiro do Paço square, Lisbon.

Following the establishment of the Constitutional Monarchy, Portugal applied deep reforms in its legal system that included a wide process of legal codification. This process led to the creation of a number of codes of law, including the constitutions themselves (Constitution of 1822, replaced by the Constitutional Charter of 1826), the Administrative Code (1842), the Penal Code (1852, after a failed initial attempt in 1837), the Civil Code (1867) and the Commercial Code (1883).

The first Portuguese Civil Code closely followed the model of the Napoleonic Code, being approved by the charter of law of 1 July 1867 and entering in force on 22 March 1868. It is referred as the "Code of 1867" or as the "Seabra's Code" due to the important collaboration of the jurist António Luís de Seabra (Count of Seabra) in its making.

Although formally in force for 100 years, the Code of 1867 suffered many modifications during its history. These included the amendments made since the beginning of the 20th century to tilt the Portuguese civil law towards the approach of the German legal system, by the influence of the ideas defended by the legal theorists of the University of Coimbra, headed by professor Guilherme Alves Moreira.

The Civil Code of 1867 was also applied to the then Portuguese overseas territories. In the Portuguese India, it was introduced in 1870, suffering a major local adaption in 1880 to contemplate the usages of the local Hindu community. With the amendments and adaptations suffered until then, the Code of 1867 was in force in the territories of Portuguese India when the Republic of India invaded them (Dadra and Nagar Haveli in 1954 and the rest of the territories in 1961), with the Code of 1966 never being applied here. The Portuguese legal system was kept in place and the Code of 1867 is still in force in what is now the Goa state – where it is referred as the Goa Civil Code or the Goa Family Law – and also in what is now the union territory of Dadra and Nagar Haveli and Daman and Diu.

The second and current Civil Code was established on 25 November 1966, entering in force on 1 June 1967. It is referred as the "Civil Code of 1966" or as the "Vaz Serra's Code" in honor to Adriano Vaz Serra, who presided the commission that created it. This new Code followed the model of the German Civil Code (Bürgerliches Gesetzbuch) and was the culmination of the successive transformations of the previous Code of 1867 that made it to move away from the Napoleonic model and approach the Germanistic model of civil law.

The Code of 1966 was applied both to Portugal and to the reminiscent Portuguese overseas territories at that time. It continued to be in force until today in Angola, Cape Verde, Guinea-Bissau, Mozambique and São Tomé and Príncipe, even after the independence of these countries in the period of 1974–1975. In Timor-Leste, it was replaced de facto (although not de jure) by the Indonesian Civil Code (itself based in the Dutch Civil Code of 1838) when Indonesia annexed this country in 1976, following its invasion in the previous year. After regaining independence in 2002, Timor-Leste adopted its own Civil Code in 2011, which follows closely the Portuguese Code of 1966. Macau continued under Portuguese administration until 1999 and, in this last this year, replaced the Code of 1966 by its own Civil Code which effectively amounts to a revision of the previous Code, prepared under the influence of Portuguese jurists, especially from the Faculty of Law of the University of Coimbra.

=== Modern era ===
After the Carnation Revolution in 1974, the Portuguese legal system was changed due to the new political and civil demands. The new Constitution approved in 1976, was written under a myriad of communist and socialist-inspired ideologies and bias to replace the previous regime's system. For a number of years, the country bounced between socialism and adherence to the neoliberal model. Land reform and nationalizations were enforced. Until the constitutional revisions of 1982 and 1989, the Constitution was a highly charged ideological document with numerous references to socialism, the rights of workers and the desirability of a socialist economy.

The sharp increase of the number of lawyers and judicial state-employees throughout the following decades did not produce increased efficiency in the legal system. The proliferation of both private and public law schools created a massive increase of numerus clausus vacancies for new law students across the whole country year after year, together with lower admission selectivity and a downgrade of academic integrity. Already internationally known for decades as excruciatingly slow and inefficient for European Union and USA standards, Portugal's justice system was by 2011 the second slowest in Western Europe after Italy's, even though it has one of the highest rates of judges and prosecutors, over 30 per 100,000 people, a feature that plagued the entire Portuguese public service, reputed for its overcapacity, useless redundancies and a general lack of productivity as a whole. After the collapse of the Portuguese public finances and banking system in 2011 amid the larger European sovereign debt crisis that impelled Portugal to European Union-International Monetary Fund state bailout, many reforms were put in place and measures to cut down costs and increase productivity were enforced across the entire public service. The number of district courts were slashed to 23 from 320, pooling their work in larger centers and closing courts in rural areas where the population has shrunk since the system was established in 1837. Courts were also reorganized to specialize to deal with labor or trade issues.

== Legislative system ==
=== Legislative process ===
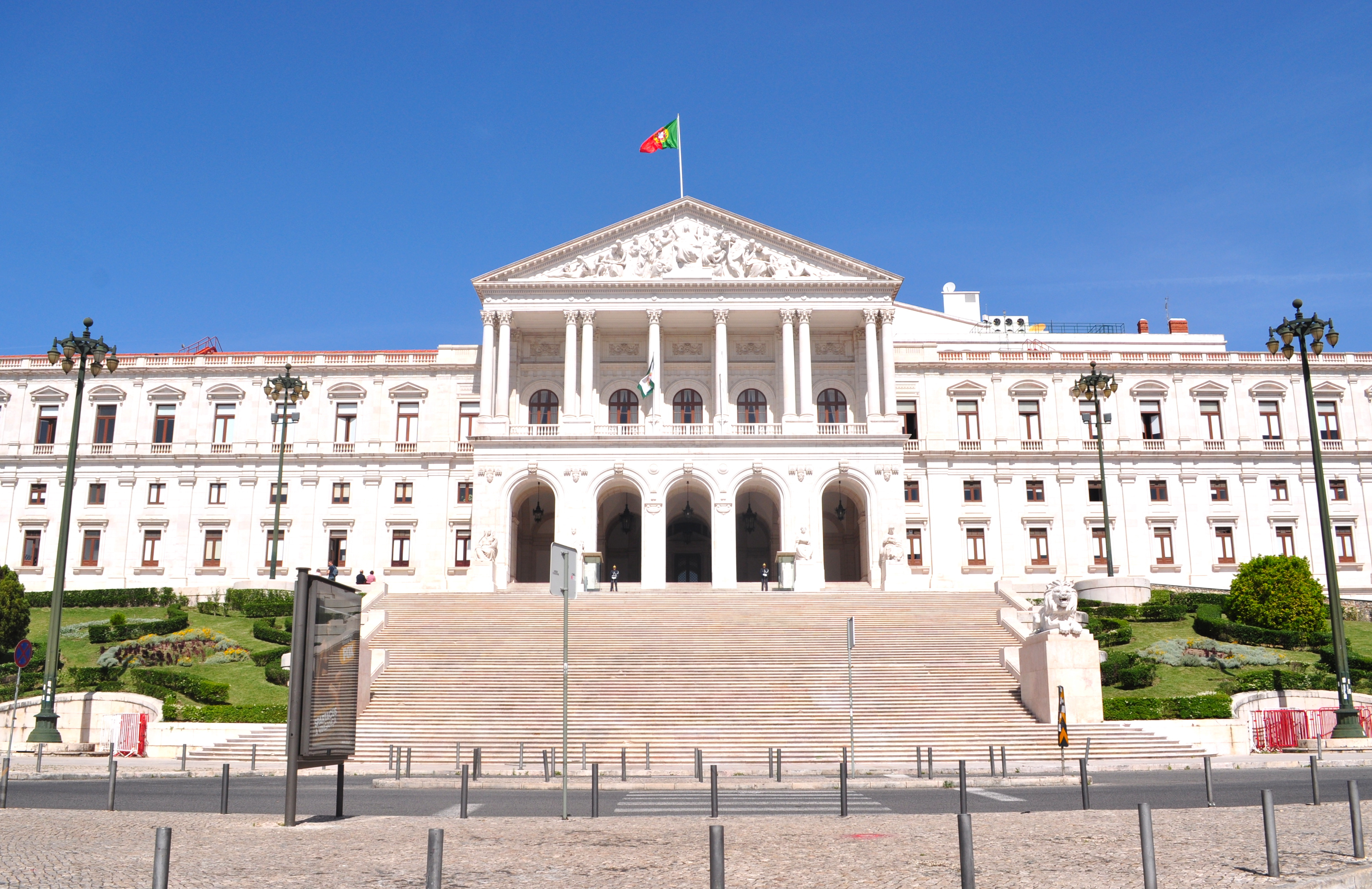
The seat of the Portuguese Legislature in Lisbon.

Accordingly, with the Portuguese Constitution, the legislative function is shared between the Assembly of the Republic (parliament), the Government and the self-government bodies of the Portuguese autonomous regions (only for specific regional matters). The Government can only legislate about its own organization, about the development and regulation of basic laws issued by the Assembly and on matters for which it is authorized to legislate by the Assembly (under a legislative authorization). All other matters must be legislated by the Assembly, including some reserved matters regarding which no legislative authorization can be given to the Government. The legislative function reserved for the bodies of self-government of the autonomous regions is assured by their respective regional legislative assemblies, in the conditions defined by the Constitution and the political and administrative statute of each region.

The legislative process is led either by the Assembly of the Republic, by the Government or by the legislative assemblies of the autonomous regions, depending on the matter to be legislated and the corresponding respective competence of each body. The ordinary laws issued by the Assembly of the Republic are named "laws", those issued by the Government are named "decree-laws" and those issued by the regional legislative assemblies are named "regional legislative decrees".

The process of creation of the laws of the Assembly of the Republic starts with a bill either proposed by members of parliament (named "projects of law") or by the Government (named "proposals of law"). If approved by the Assembly, the bill starts to be designated "decree" and is sent for the promulgation by the President of the Republic. The promulgation is the act by which the President solemnly testifies the existence of a rule of law and intimates its observation. The President may however decide not to promulgate the act and to veto it with a political or legal justification. The veto can be exceeded if the bill is voted and approved by of more than two-thirds of the members of parliament, in which case the President is obliged to promulgate it. After the promulgation, the act is sent to the Government for a ministerial referenda and then is published in the Diário da República (official journal) as a law.

The process for the creation of decree-laws by the Government has two ways. The first one is the way of successive signatures, by which the bill is separately signed by each of the responsible ministers and by the Prime Minister, then being sent to be promulgated by the President. The second is the collective approval of the bill by the Council of Ministers, it then being sent to be promulgated. The President can also veto the Government bills, in which case the Government has the options of either archiving them, changing them or sending them to the Assembly of the Republic as a proposal of law. After being promulgated, the decree-laws also enter in force after being published in the Diário da República.

=== Effectiveness of the laws ===
In Portugal, the mandatory of a law appears with its publication in the Diário da República, but its effectiveness does not start in the day of the publication. The time interval between the date of publication and the date of effectiveness is the vacatio legis. This interval can be defined by the legislator as being from one day to one year. If the date of effectiveness is not expressly defined in the law, a vacatio legis of five days is assumed by default.

Portuguese laws can lose their effectiveness either by expiry or by revocation. The expiry can result from a clause in the own law (saying that the law is only effective during a given time or while a given situation occurs) or can result from the disappearance of the cause that originated the creation of the law. Regarding revocation, this results from the demonstration of a new will from the legislator against the previous will. The revocation can be partial (with only some dispositions of the old law being revoked by the new one) or total (with the revocation of the whole old law). The revocation can also be classified either as express (when a new law expressly declares the revocation of an old one) or as tacit (when it results from the incompatibility of the dispositions of a new law with the dispositions of an old one).

=== Hierarchy of the laws ===
The several types of laws, acts and statutes of Portugal constitute a hierarchic legislative system, with several ranks. The laws of the lower ranks have to comply with the laws of higher ranks. The hierarchy has the Portuguese Constitution in its top and is the following:
1st rank – Constitutional laws, namely:

- Constitution (Constituição);
- Loose constitutional laws (leis constitucionais avulsas);
- Constitutional revision laws (leis de revisão constitutional).

2nd rank – International laws, namely:

- Rules and principles of the general or common international law;
- Norms of international conventions duly ratified or approved;
- Decisions adopted by the competent bodies of international organizations of which Portugal is a part;
- Provisions of the treaties governing the European Union and the decisions adopted by its institutions in the exercise of their respective powers.

3rd rank – Ordinary laws, namely:

- Laws (leis);
- Decree-laws (decretos-lei);
- Regional legislative decrees (decretos legislativos regionais).

4th rank – Acts with the force equivalent to that of laws, including:

- Adoption of conventions, treaties or international agreements;
- Constitutional Court decisions of unconstitutionality or illegality with general binding;
- Collective labor agreements and other instruments of collective regulation of labor;
- Case laws (assentos) of the Supreme Court of Justice and of the Court of Auditors.

5th rank – Regulatory acts, including:

- Regulatory decrees (decretos regulamentares);
- Regulations (regulamentos);
- Decrees (decretos);
- Regional regulatory decrees (decretos regulamentares regionais);
- Resolutions (resoluções) of the Assembly of the Republic, of the Permanent Commission of the Assembly of the Republic, of the Council of State, of the Council of Ministers and of the regional legislative assemblies;
- Regiments (regimentos) of the Assembly of the Republic, of the Council of State and of the regional legislative assemblies;
- Ordinances (portarias);
- Normative orders (despachos normativos);
- Police regulations of the civil governors (regulamentos policiais dos governadores civis);
- Municipal by-laws (posturas);
- Municipal regulations (regulamentos autárquicos).

== Specific legislation ==
=== Main laws of Portugal ===
From the countless loose legislation, stands out a number of legal codes that constitute the framework of the various branches of the Law of Portugal.

The principal law of Portugal is the Constitution (1976), which also constitutes the framework of the branch of constitutional law.

Regarding the other major branches of the law, they are mainly covered by the following codes:

- Criminal and criminal procedure – the Penal Code (1982), the Penal Procedure Code (1987), the Military Justice Code (2003) and the Sentence and Custodial Measures Execution Code (2009);
- Civil and civil procedure – the Civil Code (1966), the Civil Procedure Code (2004) and the Civil Register Code (1995);
- Labour law – the Labour Code (2003) and the Labour Procedure Code (1999);
- Administrative law – the Administrative Procedure Code (1991), the Public Contracts Code (2008), the Administrative Courts Procedure Code (2002) and the Administrative Code (1945, still partially effective but now largely obsolete);
- Commercial law – the Commercial Register Code (1986) and the Commercial Code (1888, still partially effective but now largely obsolete);
- Corporate law – the Commercial Societies Code (1986);
- Tax law – the Tax over Added Value Code (1984), the Tax over Single Persons Income Code (1988), the Tax over Collective Persons Income Code (1988) and the Tax Courts Procedure Code (1999);
- Entertainment law – the Advertisement Code (1990);
- Transport law – the Road Code (2005);
- Intellectual property law – the Industrial Property Code (1995) and the Copyright and Related Rights Code (1985).

=== Capital punishment ===
Portugal was one of the first countries in the world to abolish capital punishment. It was abolished in stages – for political crimes in 1852, for all crimes except the military in 1867, and for all crimes in 1911. In 1916 Portugal entered in World War I and capital punishment was reestablished only for military crimes in war time with a foreign country and only in the theater of war. With the new Constitution in 1976, it was again abolished for all crimes.

The last execution in Portugal took place in Lagos in 1846. A possible execution of a soldier of the Portuguese Expeditionary Corps carried out in France during World War One remains poorly documented.

=== Life imprisonment ===
In 1884, Portugal became the first country in the world to abolish life imprisonment. Presently, no person can be in prison for more than 25 years.

Besides having abolished life imprisonment, Portugal is the only country in the world that considers that this type of punishment—both for minors and majors, with or without the possibility of parole - is a violation of human rights.

=== LGBT legislation ===
In the 2000s, Portugal increasingly became one of the most LGBT-friendly countries in the world, with many pro-LGBT legislation and bans on LGBT discrimination, including one of the few Constitutions in the world that protects on grounds of sexual orientation. As examples, LGBT are allowed to serve openly in the Portuguese Military and are also legally allowed to donate blood. On 31 May 2010, Portugal became the sixth country in Europe and the eighth country in the world to legally recognize same-sex marriage on the national level. The law came into force on 5 June 2010.

A new Law of Gender Identity come into effect in 2011. Being considered the most liberal of its kind in the world, it allows for transsexual people to change their name and sex in legal documentation.

In 2015, the full equality in parenting for LGBT couples was authorized by law. The LGBT-parenting single adoption was already previously allowed, joint adoption by the couple is legal since 2016.

=== Drugs legislation ===
Portugal was a pioneer in the approach to the drug abuse as a health issue, instead of the traditional criminal approach, implementing a new drug legislation in July 2001 that largely decriminalized drug use. In the world, the Portuguese drug policy and legislation is being used as a case study for other countries that desire to reform their policies and laws on this matter.

The new legislation maintained the status of illegality for using or possessing any drug for personal use without authorization. However, the offense was changed from a criminal one, with prison as a possible punishment, to an administrative one if the amount possessed was no more than ten days' supply of that substance. Marijuana possession for personal use is no longer a criminal offence.

== Influence in other countries ==
The Portuguese variant of the civil law is used or is the basis of the law of various other countries and territories around the world, mostly former territories of the Portuguese Empire.

=== Angola ===
The Law of Portugal was applied in Angola until its independence in 1975. Many Portuguese laws effective before 1975 are still in force, namely the Portuguese Civil Code of 1966 with changes made in some matters. The new commercial law created after the reestablishment of the market economy in Angola is also still very influenced by the Portuguese one, with the Angolan Code of Commercial Societies of 2004 being based in the Portuguese similar Code of 1986.

=== Brazil ===
The Law of Portugal was applied in Brazil until its independence in 1822. After the independence, the Portuguese laws continued in force, gradually being supplemented or amended by the laws of the Empire of Brazil and latter by the Brazilian republican laws. Although already separate, having an independent development and receiving other influences, the Law of Brazil continued to be very influenced by the Law of Portugal, given the cultural affinities between the two countries, the high number of Portuguese residents in Brazil and also the fact that many Brazilian jurists received their training in law in the University of Coimbra. The Portuguese Ordinances of 1606 continued to be the frame of the civil law of Brazil until 1916, when the first Brazilian Civil Code entered in force. This Code was based in the German Civil Code (Bürgerliches Gesetzbuch or BGB), what coincided with a trend that was also being followed in Portugal of an approach to the Germanistic system of law. The present Brazilian Civil Code is that of 2002, being also inspired in the BGB, but also with a marked influence from the Portuguese Civil Code of 1966.

The constitutional law of Portugal also has a marked influence in Brazil, with the Portuguese Constitution of 1976 and the works on constitutional law developed by the Portuguese legal theorist José Gomes Canotilho being the main inspirations of the present Constitution of Brazil.

=== Cape Verde ===
In Cape Verde, many of the Portuguese laws effective before its independence in 1975 are still in force. Namely, with some alterations, are still in force the Portuguese Civil Code of 1966 and the Commercial Code of 1888. New Cape Verde laws continue to be very influenced by the Portuguese law.

=== Guinea-Bissau ===
Many of the Portuguese laws effective before the independence of Guinea-Bissau in 1974 are still in force. The Portuguese Civil Code of 1966 is still in force with some alterations. In the matter of commercial law however, the Law of Guinea-Bissau is becoming increasingly influenced by the law resulting from the Treaty of Harmonization of the Commercial Law in Africa of 1993, which follows French law.

=== India ===
Historically, the former Portuguese India contributed to Portuguese legal science with a number of important jurists and legislators, including the goan Luiz da Cunha Gonçalves.

The Portuguese civil law system still prevails in the last territories of the former Portuguese India (corresponding to the present State of Goa and Union Territory of Dadra and Nagar Haveli and Daman and Diu). At the time of the Indian occupation of those territories (1954 for Dadra and Nagar Haveli and 1961 for Goa, Daman and Diu) the Portuguese laws were effective there, namely the Civil Code of 1868, although with local adaptations mainly related with their application to the Hindu community. The Portuguese Code of 1966 was never applied in those territories, as it became effective only after the Indian occupation.

The Portuguese legal system was maintained after the occupation, although rapidly becoming altered by the influence of the English common law applied in the rest of India. This process was accelerated by the forced cut of relations with Portugal and the restrictions to the use of the Portuguese language, which reduced the number of jurists and other persons able to read and understand the Portuguese laws. However, the Portuguese Civil Code of 1868 is still in force, being known in India as the "Goa civil code" or the "Goa Family Law". This code has been suggested to serve as the basis for a future uniform civil code of India, intended to replace the personal laws based on the scriptures and customs of each major religious community in the country with a common set governing every citizen.

=== Macau ===
Macau was under Portuguese administration until 1999, with the general Portuguese laws being applied to that territory. The agreements between Portugal and China regarding the handover of the administration of Macau state that the Portuguese legal system would continue in force in the territory for 50 years. In the last years before the handover, the Portuguese Administration initiated a process of improving the Law of Macau, creating specific laws for the territory, although still very influenced by the Portuguese Law. One of the most important of these is the Macau Civil Code—an improvement of the Portuguese Civil Code of 1966, including a Chinese official version—that became in force in the last year of the Portuguese Administration.

=== Mozambique ===
The Portuguese Civil Code of 1966 and other Portuguese laws effective before the independence of Mozambique in 1975 are still in force, but with modifications. A new Commercial Code was adopted in 2005, replacing the Portuguese Code of 1888. A revised Penal Code came into force in 2015, replacing the Penal Code of 1886.

=== São Tomé and Príncipe ===
The Portuguese Civil Code of 1966 and other Portuguese laws effective before the independence of São Tomé and Príncipe in 1975 are still in force, but with modifications.

=== Timor-Leste ===
The Portuguese Law was in force in Timor-Leste until its invasion by Indonesia in 1975. After the invasion and occupation, the Indonesian law replaced de facto the Portuguese one (although not de jure, as the occupation was never recognized by the international community). This implied the application of the Indonesian Civil Code, which is based on the Dutch Civil Code of 1838 (Burgerlijk Wetboek). As a provisional measure, the Indonesian law was kept in force after the independence of Timor-Leste in 2002, this being gradually replaced by Timorese own laws. The new Timorese law about the commercial societies of 2004 is very influenced by the Portuguese Code of Commercial Societies of 1986. In 2011, the Indonesian Civil Code was replaced by the new Civil Code of Timor-Leste, which is based in the Portuguese Civil Code of 1966.

== Education, training and research in law ==
The Faculty of Law of the University of Coimbra, at the University Yard.

Portugal has a number of both public and private schools of Law. The oldest is the Faculty of Law of the University of Coimbra, which dates back to the 13th century.

Both the faculties of Law of the University of Lisbon and of the University of Coimbra are nowadays the most reputed, thanks to the number of distinguished alumni and professors linked to them. Lisbon's faculty is linked to personalities such as Marcelo Caetano, Marcelo Rebelo de Sousa, António de Menezes Cordeiro, Jorge Miranda, António Vitorino, José Manuel Barroso, Adriano Moreira and Mário Soares. Coimbra's faculty is linked to personalities like António de Oliveira Salazar, Laura Rio and Almeida Santos.

The School of Law of the Portuguese Catholic University is also well known, achieving notability by its academic publications, the curriculum of its teaching staff and the number of alumni it harbors. Both the Faculty of Law the Nova University and the School of Law of the Minho University are considered modern law schools with an increasingly high reputation.

In the 1990s, the offer of law degrees in Portugal became widespread across the entire country through both public and private university institutions. By 2010, lower selectiveness and academic integrity levels, including in law schools previously known for its reputation and prestige, debased the average teaching of law in Portugal according to the head of the Ordem dos Advogados Marinho Pinto.

== See also ==
- Crime in Portugal
- Drug policy of Portugal
- Portugal
