= José Eduardo Martins =

José Eduardo Martins may refer to:

- José Eduardo Martins (pianist) – Brazilian concert pianist
- José Eduardo Martins (politician) – Portuguese lawyer and politician
