= António Garcia Pereira =

Portuguese lawyer and politician

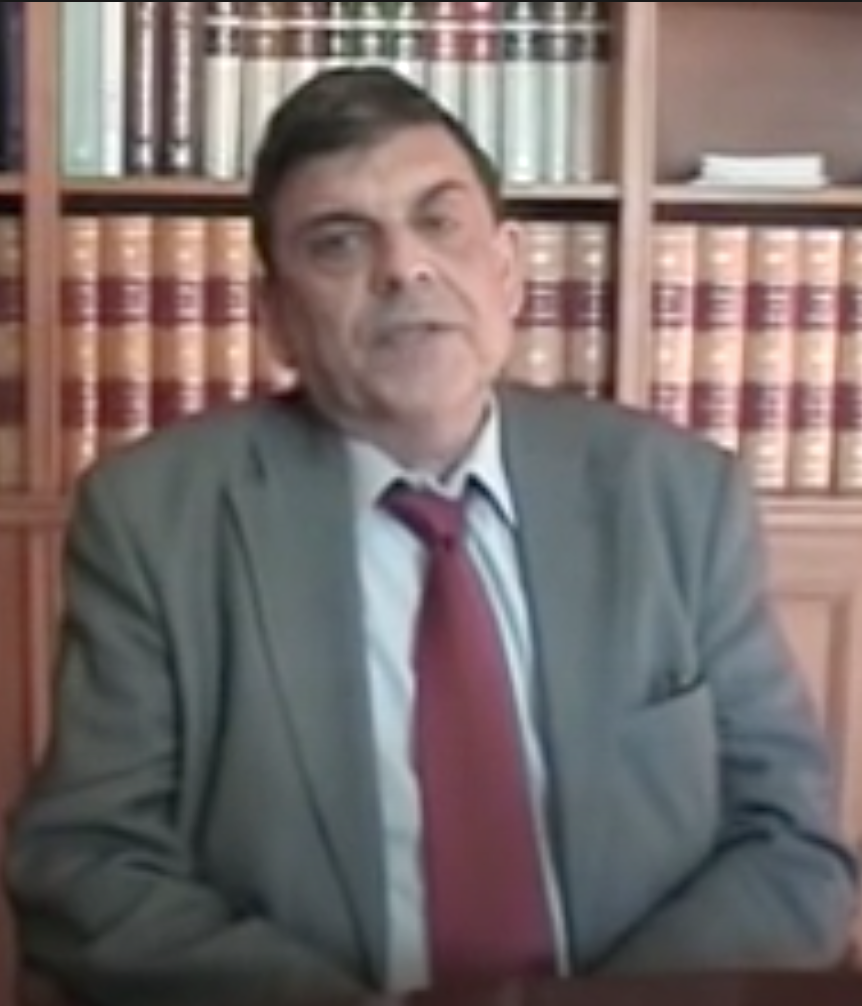
António Garcia Pereira

António Pestana Garcia Pereira (born 14 November 1952) is a Portuguese lawyer, university professor, and politician. Until 2015, he was the best-known member of the Marxist–Leninist PCTP/MRPP - Portuguese Workers' Communist Party/Re-Organized Movement of the Party of the Proletariat.

He was a candidate in the 2006 presidential election, where he placed sixth with 0.44 per cent of the vote. He had already run in the 2001 presidential election, getting 1.69 per cent of the vote.

He served as president of the Human Rights Commission of the Portuguese Bar Association from 1998 to 2000. Currently, he holds the positions of president of the Portuguese Association for Citizens' Rights, honorary president of the CPLP Energy Union Committee, and honorary president of APAR – the Portuguese Association for Prisoner Support.

== Early life, education and career ==
António Garcia Pereira is the son of Aníbal Garcia Pereira, a German teacher, and Maria Emília Rego dos Santos Pestana de Garcia Pereira, a housewife and daughter of Manuel Gregório Pestana Júnior, Finance Minister of the First Portuguese Republic. Pestana Júnior gained prominence during the 1907 academic strike led by republican students, for which he was prosecuted, tried, and acquitted. He served as administrator of the municipality of Funchal on the island of Madeira, appointed by the Republic in 1911. From 1922 to 1926, he was a member of the Legislative Assembly of Madeira representing Lisbon. In 1924, he became Finance Minister in the government of José Domingues dos Santos, and together they founded the Democratic Leftwing Republican Party. Pestana Júnior authored numerous legal works and a historical study on the nationality of Christopher Columbus, titled "Symão Palha", arguing Columbus's Portuguese nationality as a secret agent for King John II. António Garcia Pereira was deeply influenced by his maternal grandfather and followed in his footsteps.

Garcia Pereira is the nephew of Colonel Francisco Vasconcellos Pestana, one of the organizers of the Assault on the Beja Barracks, an attempt to overthrow the Portuguese dictatorship Estado Novo that occurred from 31 December 1961 to 1 January 1962.

Garcia Pereira graduated from the Faculty of Law of the University of Lisbon in 1975 and completed his PhD in Labour Law in 2002 in Nova University Lisbon. He began teaching at the University of Lisbon in 1975 and has been working as a lawyer since 1977, the year he was admitted to the Portuguese Bar Association, which awarded him the title of specialist in Labour Law. Subsequently, he founded Garcia Pereira & Associates, a law firm.

He combined his legal practice with university teaching in several universities. On the day he turned 70, he gave his last lecture, open to the public, titled "Work and Labor Law in the 21st Century".

An author of numerous books and articles, he has also made several appearances on television discussing politics and citizens' rights. His life has been marked by an unwavering commitment to defending workers and advocating for citizens' rights, freedoms, and guarantees. Since November 2017, he has been a columnist for the newspaper "Notícias Online" and occasionally contributes to the magazine "[sem] Equívocos".

Garcia Pereira is married and father of four children.

== Political career ==
Garcia Pereira actively participated in the student protest movement against Estado Novo during his youth. He joined the Marxist–Leninist Students' Federation, the youth wing of the MRPP, in 1972, the year he witnessed the assassination of José Ribeiro dos Santos by PIDE.

He was involved in the associative movement 'Dare to Fight, Dare to Win,' and faced suspension and disciplinary proceedings at the Faculty of Law of the University of Lisbon in December 1973.

A member of the PCTP/MRPP since 1974, a political group with a significant presence in Lisbon's university milieu, Garcia Pereira rose to leadership within the Central Committee of this organization in 1982. He ran as a candidate in legislative elections, municipal elections in Lisbon, and for President of the Portuguese Republic in 2001 and 2006

After more than 30 years as a member of the PCTP/MRPP, he was suspended from the permanent committee of the party's Central Committee on 6 October 2015, along with four other members, for being considered the 'main responsible' for the defeat in the legislative elections. On 25 November 2015, Garcia Pereira resigned from the PCTP/MRPP, citing 'constant personal attacks and defamatory accusations of all kinds, without any opportunity for debate,' published against him in the party's online newspaper. His wife, Sandra Pereira Vinagre, and daughter, Rita Garcia Pereira, publicly defended him, seeking to clarify the truth for the public.

On 24 May 2017, Garcia Pereira ended his silence since 6 October 2015 by launching a website containing eight texts aimed at exposing the truth behind the falsehoods published in the PCTP/MRPP newspaper over the previous 18 months. The introductory text explained his reasons for breaking his silence: the obligation to reveal the truth, respect for his party comrades and friends, and for the 60,000 PCTP/MRPP voters. He emphasized that he could no longer remain silent in the face of such lies.

== Election results ==
=== 2001 Portuguese presidential election ===
António Garcia Pereira finished fifth with 68,900 votes (1.59%).

=== 2006 Portuguese presidential election ===
António Garcia Pereira finished sixth with 23,983 votes (0.44%).

== Honors ==
In November 2013, he received the 'Political Excellence' award at the gala of 'Mais Alentejo' magazine.

In May 2018, he was bestowed with the Honorary Medal of the Portuguese Bar Association. This prestigious medal recognizes lawyers who, through their merit, integrity, and practice, have significantly enhanced the dignity and prestige of the legal profession.

In 2022, he was recognized by Chambers and Partners, the leading international directory of lawyers and law firms, as one of Portugal's foremost lawyers in Employment Law in the Chambers Europe Guide 2022: 'António Pestana Garcia Pereira of Garcia Pereira SP is a distinguished practitioner in the employment sector, renowned for his exceptional representation of employees in litigation.'

In May 2024, he was awarded the Nelson Mandela Award by the ProPública Association—Law and Citizenship.
