= Aurora Rodrigues =

Portuguese magistrate (born 1952)

- Born: Aurora Rosa Salvador Rodrigues; 20 January 1952 (age 74); Mértola, Portugal
- Education: University of Lisbon
- Occupation: Public Prosecution Service magistrate

Aurora Rosa Salvador Rodrigues (born 20 January 1952) is a Portuguese retired magistrate of the Public Prosecution Service. Rodrigues studied law at the University of Lisbon. After she attended a student demonstration, the Polícia Internacional e de Defesa do Estado (PIDE) arrested her. The PIDE deprived Rodrigues of sleep for over two weeks to induce hallucinations, among other forms of torture. She was never formally charged and was released after three months. Rodrigues graduated and became a magistrate and president of the Evorian section of the Sindicato dos Magistrados (Prosecutors' Union). After retiring, she wrote an account of her experiences with the Estado Novo.

== Biography ==
Aurora Rodrigues was born in Mértola, Portugal, in the Alentejo Region on 20 January 1952, near the São Domingos Mine. At 17 years old, she enrolled in the School of Law at the University of Lisbon for the 1969–1970 academic year. At the university, the Portuguese Communist Party approached Rodrigues about becoming a militant, but she joined the Portuguese Workers' Communist Party, Movimento Reorganizativo do Partido do Proletariado (MRPP), due to their strong opposition to the Portuguese Colonial War. Rodrigues became a MRPP party member after another law student, Ribeiro dos Santos, was shot and killed by the PIDE.

On 3 May 1973, at 21 years old, Rodrigues was arrested by the PIDE when leaving the university after a student demonstration. She became a political prisoner during the Estado Novo, or "New State", a dictatorship that controlled Portugal from the 1930s until the 1974 Carnation Revolution. She was kept in the Fort of Caxias prison for three months and tortured. Rodrigues was deprived of sleep for over two weeks, drowned repeatedly, kept in stress positions, beaten, and denied access to her reflection. The PIDE deprived political prisoners of sleep to induce hallucinations. Rodrigues said that after days without sleep, she began to see and hear elevators in the prison that did not exist. Mirrors were banned to reduce political prisoners' control of their own image. Rodrigues said that the memory of Ribeiro dos Santos, the support of her family, and the support of her classmate Ana Gomes were critical to her survival. She was released after three months on 28 July 1973. She was never given a lawyer, sent to trial, or formally charged with any crime.

In 1974, she was arrested again. After the 25 April Carnation Revolution, she returned to Caxias with Arnaldo Matos. Both had been MRPP members. They arrived at the party headquarters on 28 May 1975, and both were arrested by Comando Operacional do Continente (COPCON), the military organization led by Otelo Saraiva de Carvalho that controlled Portugal in the wake of the revolution. Across Portugal, 432 MRPP activists were incarcerated. Rodrigues did not give public statements about being targeted or tortured by the PIDE until many years later. She said that the "mood after the revolution discouraged political prisoners from speaking out".

In 1977, Rodrigues left the MRPP. She became a magistrate of the Public Prosecution Service in Évora and Santarém, Portugal. From 2009 to 2012 she was president of the Evorian section of the Sindicato dos Magistrados (Prosecutors' Union). In 2024, the Portuguese Bar Association selected Rodrigues to receive the Elina Guimarães Award for defending women's rights.

== Book ==
In the 2011 book Gente Comum – Uma História na PIDE, Rodrigues describes her experience as a political prisoner. She sought to counter the idea that political prisoners of Estado Novo were all well-known politicians. Rodrigues describes the first 25 years of her life as an example of an ordinary citizen targeted by the regime. Historian António Monteiro Cardoso and anthropologist Paula Godinho edited the book and provided notes for historical and social context. The book was endorsed by the Sindicato dos Magistrados do Ministério Público and the Associação de Mulheres Juristas. It was presented by historian Fernando Rosas.
