= Ordem dos Advogados =

Ordem dos Avogados (Portuguese for: Order of the Attorneys), refers to the bar associations of several Portuguese speaking countries, namely:

- Ordem dos Advogados de Angola, the bar association of Angola
- Ordem dos Advogados do Brasil, the bar association of Brazil
- Ordem dos Advogados de Cabo Verde, the bar association of Cape Verde
- Ordem dos Advogados da Guiné-Bissau, the bar Association of Guinea-Bissau
- Ordem dos Advogados de Moçambique, the bar Association of Mozambique
- Ordem dos Advogados Portugueses, the bar association of Portugal
- Ordem dos Advogados de São Tomé e Príncipe, the bar Association of São Tomé and Príncipe
