= Marxist–Leninist Students' Federation =

Student group within the Portuguese Workers' Communist Party

The Marxist–Leninist Students' Federation (Portuguese: Federação dos Estudantes Marxistas-Leninistas) was the students wing of the MRPP. FEM-L played an important role in the early years of the party.

It was through the FEM-L that the MRPP established itself as one of the main political forces in Portuguese universities in the final years of the dictatorship and would become one of the largest and most active radical organizations of the revolutionary period. Its propaganda organ was the newspaper Guarda Vermelha.

Among the FEM-L militants were José Ribeiro Santos, Alexandrino de Sousa, António Garcia Pereira, José Manuel Durão Barroso and Saldanha Sanches.

José Ribeiro Santos was murdered by the General Directorate of Security on October 12, 1972, following clashes during student demonstrations at the Faculty of Law of the University of Lisbon. His death triggered numerous demonstrations demanding freedom and protesting against the political repression of the Estado Novo. His funeral was attended by thousands of people, mostly students, who were involved in clashes with security forces. In the weeks following the assassination, several demonstrations, student strikes and clashes took place in Lisbon, resulting in the closure of several universities. On October 9, 1975, Alexandrino de Sousa, also a law student, leader of FEM-L and director of the newspaper Guarda Vermelha, was thrown into the Tagus River by a group of UDP militants while putting up posters marking the death of Ribeiro dos Santos, and drowned.
