= Emília Cerqueira =

Portuguese politician

Member of the Assembly of the Republic
- Incumbent
- Assumed office 25 October 2015
- Constituency: Viana do Castelo

Member of the Arcos de Valdevez Municipal Assembly
- Incumbent
- Assumed office 16 December 2001

Personal details
- Born: Maria Emília e Sousa Cerqueira; 14 March 1971 (age 55) Viana do Castelo, Portugal
- Party: Social Democratic Party
- Occupation: Lawyer • Politician

Maria Emília e Sousa Cerqueira (born 14 March 1971) is a Portuguese politician. A member of the centre-right Social Democratic Party (PSD), Cerqueira was first elected to the Assembly of the Republic in the 2015 national election as a representative of the Viana do Castelo constituency. She was re-elected in 2019, 2022 and 2024.

== Early life and education ==
Cerqueira was born on 14 March 1971. She has a degree in law and began to work as a lawyer in 1999.

== Political career ==
Since 2001 Cerqueira has been a deputy on the municipal assembly of Arcos de Valdevez a municipality along the border between Portugal and the Galicia region of Spain. She became a member of the Committee for Protection of Children and Youth (Commissão de Proteção de Crianças e Jovens) for the municipality. In 2008 she also became a member of the inter-municipal community of Alto Minho.

Cerqueira was elected to the Assembly of the Republic in the 2015 election on the PSD list for the Viana do Castelo constituency. She was re-elected in the 2019 election and, again, in the 2022 election, which was called early by the prime minister, António Costa, following the failure of his left-wing coalition partners to support the budget. She was second on the PSD list of candidates for Viana do Castelo, with her party winning three of the available seats. During her first two terms in parliament, Cerqueira was a member of the parliamentary committees on Constitutional Matters, Rights, Liberties and Guarantees and on Work, Social Security and Inclusion.

In February 2022, Cerqueira and José Silvano, the Secretary-General of the PSD, were acquitted after long-running court proceedings following allegations that she had falsely entered his code into the National Assembly’s computer, thus recording him as being present when he was not. She was re-elected to the Assembly of the Republic in March 2024.
