= Júlio Castro Caldas =

Portuguese lawyer and politician (1943–2020)

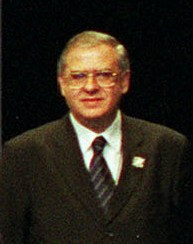

Minister of National Defence
- In office 25 October 1999 – 3 July 2001
- Prime Minister: Antonio Guterres
- Preceded by: Jaime Gama
- Succeeded by: Rui Pena

President of the Portuguese Bar Association
- In office 1993–1998
- Preceded by: Maria de Jesus Serra Lopes
- Succeeded by: António Pires de Lima

Personal details
- Born: 19 November 1943 Arcos de Valdevez, Portugal
- Died: 4 January 2020 (aged 76) Lisbon, Portugal
- Party: Socialist Party
- Education: University of Lisbon
- Profession: lawyer

Júlio de Lemos de Castro Caldas (19 November 1943 – 4 January 2020) was a Portuguese lawyer and politician.

== Legal career ==
Castro Caldas was born on 19 November 1943, and raised in Arcos de Valdevez. He graduated from the Faculty of Law of the University of Lisbon, and cofounded the CLA law firm alongside Correia Lopes and Mendes de Almeida. Castro Caldas was a founding member of the Association for Economic and Social Development, as well as the Portuguese Society of Arbitration. He led the Portuguese Bar Association as president from 1993 to 1999, serving two terms.

== Political career ==
Castro Caldas was elected to the Assembly of the Republic from Viana do Castelo in 1980 and served until 1983, as a member of the Social Democratic Party. He then served as Minister of National Defence between 1999 and 2001. In November 2001, he began serving on the Superior Council of the Public Prosecution Service. Castro Caldas stepped down from the position in 2012. He died on 4 January 2020, aged 76, after seeking medical treatment for a stroke at the CUF Infante Santo Hospital in Lisbon.
