= Viana do Castelo (Assembly of the Republic constituency) =

Constituency of the Assembly of the Republic, the national legislature of Portugal

- Constituency for the Assembly of the Republic
- Location of Viana do Castelo within Portugal
- District: Viana do Castelo
- Population: 234,645 (2024)
- Electorate: 232,581 (2025)
- Area: 2,219 km^{2} (2024)

Current Constituency
- Created: 1976
- Seats: List: 5 (2024–present); 6 (1979–2024); 7 (1976–1979)
- Deputies: List: José Pedro Aguiar-Branco (PSD); Manuela Carvalho (PSD); José Lago Gonçalves (PSD); Marina Gonçalves (PS); Eduardo Teixeira (CH)

Viana do Castelo is one of the 22 multi-member constituencies of the Assembly of the Republic, the national legislature of Portugal. The constituency was established in 1976 when the Assembly of the Republic was established by the constitution following the restoration of democracy. It is conterminous with the district of Viana do Castelo. The constituency currently elects five of the 230 members of the Assembly of the Republic using the closed party-list proportional representation electoral system. At the 2025 legislative election it had 232,581 registered electors.

== Electoral system ==
Viana do Castelo currently elects five of the 230 members of the Assembly of the Republic using the closed party-list proportional representation electoral system. Seats are allocated using the D'Hondt method.

== Election results ==
=== Summary ===
Election	Unitary Democrats CDU / APU / PCP			Left Bloc BE / UDP			LIVRE L			Socialists PS / FRS			People Animals Nature PAN			Democratic Renewal PRD			Social Democrats PSD / PàF / AD / PPD			Liberals IL			CDS – People's CDS–PP / CDS			Chega CH / PPV/CDC / PPV		
Election	Votes	%	Seats	Votes	%	Seats	Votes	%	Seats	Votes	%	Seats	Votes	%	Seats	Votes	%	Seats	Votes	%	Seats	Votes	%	Seats	Votes	%	Seats	Votes	%	Seats
2025	2,764	2.03%	0	2,285	1.68%	0	3,640	2.67%	0	30,395	22.31%	1	1,301	0.95%	0				55,374	40.65%	3	5,344	3.92%	0				32,143	23.59%	1
2024	3,106	2.24%	0	4,926	3.55%	0	2,815	2.03%	0	40,237	29.01%	2	2,057	1.48%	0				49,616	35.77%	2	5,106	3.68%	0				26,639	19.21%	1
2022	3,816	3.07%	0	4,418	3.56%	0	919	0.74%	0	53,442	43.02%	3	1,251	1.01%	0				43,418	34.95%	3	3,652	2.94%	0	4,273	3.44%	0	7,702	6.20%	0
2019	4,841	4.17%	0	10,321	8.89%	0	688	0.59%	0	42,398	36.51%	3	2,876	2.48%	0				41,210	35.49%	3	692	0.60%	0	7,577	6.53%	0	858	0.74%	0
2015	6,722	5.46%	0	10,237	8.31%	0	453	0.37%	0	38,311	31.11%	2	1,086	0.88%	0				58,515	47.52%	4							396	0.32%	0
2011	6,648	5.15%	0	5,928	4.59%	0				35,327	27.34%	2	926	0.72%	0				58,826	45.53%	3				18,135	14.04%	1	242	0.19%	0
2009	5,934	4.32%	0	12,099	8.80%	0				51,306	37.32%	3							44,327	32.24%	2				19,243	14.00%	1	372	0.27%	0
2005	5,632	4.06%	0	6,415	4.63%	0				59,676	43.06%	3							47,645	34.38%	2				16,205	11.69%	1			
2002	4,844	3.55%	0	2,485	1.82%	0				49,122	35.97%	3							63,386	46.42%	3				14,283	10.46%	0			
1999	6,886	5.11%	0	1,689	1.25%	0				55,149	40.95%	3							49,081	36.44%	2				19,249	14.29%	1			
1995	6,614	4.63%	0	527	0.37%	0				56,234	39.37%	3							61,051	42.74%	3				16,328	11.43%	0			
1991	6,923	5.04%	0							35,212	25.66%	2				1,500	1.09%	0	79,408	57.87%	4				10,081	7.35%	0			
1987	8,741	6.41%	0	641	0.47%	0				28,351	20.80%	1				6,758	4.96%	0	76,207	55.92%	5				10,727	7.87%	0			
1985	11,591	8.46%	0	1,348	0.98%	0				25,924	18.93%	1				22,904	16.72%	1	47,253	34.50%	3				23,368	17.06%	1			
1983	13,572	10.16%	0	525	0.39%	0				44,711	33.48%	2							44,869	33.59%	3				25,291	18.94%	1			
1980	14,548	10.27%	0	996	0.70%	0				33,245	23.47%	1							86,186	60.84%	5									
1979	14,266	10.23%	0	1,312	0.94%	0				36,186	25.94%	2							79,702	57.14%	4									
1976	8,611	7.07%	0	1,110	0.91%	0				33,094	27.16%	2							42,519	34.90%	3				30,437	24.98%	2			

(Figures in italics represent alliances.)

=== Detailed ===
==== 2020s ====
===== 2025 =====
Results of the 2025 legislative election held on 18 May 2025:

Party		Votes	%	Seats
Democratic Alliance	AD	55,374	40.65%	3
Chega	CH	32,143	23.59%	1
Socialist Party	PS	30,395	22.31%	1
Liberal Initiative	IL	5,344	3.92%	0
LIVRE	L	3,640	2.67%	0
Unitary Democratic Coalition	CDU	2,764	2.03%	0
Left Bloc	BE	2,285	1.68%	0
National Democratic Alternative	ADN	2,047	1.50%	0
People Animals Nature	PAN	1,301	0.95%	0
React, Include, Recycle	RIR	315	0.23%	0
Ergue-te	E	276	0.20%	0
Volt Portugal	Volt	209	0.15%	0
People's Monarchist Party	PPM	145	0.11%	0
Valid votes		136,238	100.00%	5
Blank votes		2,363	1.69%	
Rejected votes – other		1,293	0.92%	
Total polled		139,894	60.15%	
Registered electors		232,581		

The following candidates were elected:: José Pedro Aguiar-Branco (AD); Manuela Carvalho (AD); João Manuel Esteves (AD); Marina Gonçalves (PS); and Eduardo Teixeira (CH).

===== 2024 =====
Results of the 2024 legislative election held on 10 March 2024:

Party		Votes	%	Seats
Democratic Alliance	AD	49,616	35.77%	2
Socialist Party	PS	40,237	29.01%	2
Chega	CH	26,639	19.21%	1
Liberal Initiative	IL	5,106	3.68%	0
Left Bloc	BE	4,926	3.55%	0
Unitary Democratic Coalition	CDU	3,106	2.24%	0
LIVRE	L	2,815	2.03%	0
National Democratic Alternative	ADN	2,263	1.63%	0
People Animals Nature	PAN	2,057	1.48%	0
New Right	ND	706	0.51%	0
React, Include, Recycle	RIR	624	0.45%	0
Volt Portugal	Volt	255	0.18%	0
Alternative 21 (Earth Party and Alliance)	PT-A	204	0.15%	0
Ergue-te	E	147	0.11%	0
Valid votes		138,701	100.00%	5
Blank votes		2,682	1.88%	
Rejected votes – other		1,534	1.07%	
Total polled		142,917	61.21%	
Registered electors		233,491		

The following candidates were elected: José Pedro Aguiar-Branco (AD); Emília Cerqueira (AD); José Costa (PS); Marina Gonçalves (PS); and Eduardo Teixeira (CH).

===== 2022 =====
Results of the 2022 legislative election held on 30 January 2022:

Party		Votes	%	Seats
Socialist Party	PS	53,442	43.02%	3
Social Democratic Party	PSD	43,418	34.95%	3
Chega	CH	7,702	6.20%	0
Left Bloc	BE	4,418	3.56%	0
CDS – People's Party	CDS–PP	4,273	3.44%	0
Unitary Democratic Coalition	CDU	3,816	3.07%	0
Liberal Initiative	IL	3,652	2.94%	0
People Animals Nature	PAN	1,251	1.01%	0
LIVRE	L	919	0.74%	0
React, Include, Recycle	RIR	556	0.45%	0
Earth Party	PT	190	0.15%	0
Alliance	A	173	0.14%	0
Socialist Alternative Movement	MAS	157	0.13%	0
Ergue-te	E	133	0.11%	0
Volt Portugal	Volt	130	0.10%	0
Valid votes		124,230	100.00%	6
Blank votes		1,654	1.30%	
Rejected votes – other		1,156	0.91%	
Total polled		127,040	53.82%	
Registered electors		236,042		

The following candidates were elected: Emília Cerqueira (PSD); José Costa (PS); Marina Gonçalves (PS); Jorge Salgueiro Mendes (PSD); João Montenegro (PSD); and Tiago Brandão Rodrigues (PS).

==== 2010s ====
===== 2019 =====
Results of the 2019 legislative election held on 6 October 2019:

Party		Votes	%	Seats
Socialist Party	PS	42,398	36.51%	3
Social Democratic Party	PSD	41,210	35.49%	3
Left Bloc	BE	10,321	8.89%	0
CDS – People's Party	CDS–PP	7,577	6.53%	0
Unitary Democratic Coalition	CDU	4,841	4.17%	0
People Animals Nature	PAN	2,876	2.48%	0
React, Include, Recycle	RIR	1,059	0.91%	0
Chega	CH	858	0.74%	0
Liberal Initiative	IL	692	0.60%	0
LIVRE	L	688	0.59%	0
Alliance	A	679	0.58%	0
Portuguese Workers' Communist Party	PCTP	671	0.58%	0
Together for the People	JPP	587	0.51%	0
National Renewal Party	PNR	292	0.25%	0
Democratic Republican Party	PDR	281	0.24%	0
We, the Citizens!	NC	259	0.22%	0
United Party of Retirees and Pensioners	PURP	212	0.18%	0
Earth Party	PT	209	0.18%	0
Portuguese Labour Party	PTP	208	0.18%	0
People's Monarchist Party	PPM	204	0.18%	0
Valid votes		116,122	100.00%	6
Blank votes		3,617	2.97%	
Rejected votes – other		2,174	1.78%	
Total polled		121,913	50.60%	
Registered electors		240,917		

The following candidates were elected: Emília Cerqueira (PSD); Marina Gonçalves (PS); Jorge Salgueiro Mendes (PSD); Anabela Rodrigues (PS); Tiago Brandão Rodrigues (PS); and Eduardo Teixeira (PSD).

===== 2015 =====
Results of the 2015 legislative election held on 4 October 2015:

Party		Votes	%	Seats
Portugal Ahead	PàF	58,515	47.52%	4
Socialist Party	PS	38,311	31.11%	2
Left Bloc	BE	10,237	8.31%	0
Unitary Democratic Coalition	CDU	6,722	5.46%	0
Democratic Republican Party	PDR	2,399	1.95%	0
Portuguese Workers' Communist Party	PCTP	1,117	0.91%	0
People Animals Nature	PAN	1,086	0.88%	0
We, the Citizens!	NC	1,037	0.84%	0
ACT! (Portuguese Labour Party and Socialist Alternative Movement)	AGIR	960	0.78%	0
National Renewal Party	PNR	563	0.46%	0
People's Monarchist Party	PPM	535	0.43%	0
LIVRE	L	453	0.37%	0
The Earth Party Movement	MPT	447	0.36%	0
Citizenship and Christian Democracy	PPV/CDC	396	0.32%	0
United Party of Retirees and Pensioners	PURP	209	0.17%	0
Together for the People	JPP	161	0.13%	0
Valid votes		123,148	100.00%	6
Blank votes		3,225	2.51%	
Rejected votes – other		2,139	1.66%	
Total polled		128,512	50.78%	
Registered electors		253,095		

The following candidates were elected: Carlos Abreu Amorim (PàF); Abel Baptista (PàF); José Manuel Carpinteira (PS); Emília Cerqueira (PàF); Luís Campos Ferreira (PàF); and Tiago Brandão Rodrigues (PS).

===== 2011 =====
Results of the 2011 legislative election held on 5 June 2011:

Party		Votes	%	Seats
Social Democratic Party	PSD	58,826	45.53%	3
Socialist Party	PS	35,327	27.34%	2
CDS – People's Party	CDS–PP	18,135	14.04%	1
Unitary Democratic Coalition	CDU	6,648	5.15%	0
Left Bloc	BE	5,928	4.59%	0
Portuguese Workers' Communist Party	PCTP	1,473	1.14%	0
Party for Animals and Nature	PAN	926	0.72%	0
Hope for Portugal Movement	MEP	573	0.44%	0
The Earth Party Movement	MPT	384	0.30%	0
People's Monarchist Party	PPM	331	0.26%	0
Pro-Life Party	PPV	242	0.19%	0
National Renewal Party	PNR	213	0.16%	0
Democratic Party of the Atlantic	PDA	200	0.15%	0
Valid votes		129,206	100.00%	6
Blank votes		4,009	2.97%	
Rejected votes – other		1,688	1.25%	
Total polled		134,903	52.46%	
Registered electors		257,155		

The following candidates were elected: Carlos Abreu Amorim (PSD); Rosa Arezes (PSD); Abel Baptista (CDS-PP); Jorge Fão (PS); Fernando Medina (PS); and Eduardo Teixeira (PSD).

==== 2000s ====
===== 2009 =====
Results of the 2009 legislative election held on 27 September 2009:

Party		Votes	%	Seats
Socialist Party	PS	51,306	37.32%	3
Social Democratic Party	PSD	44,327	32.24%	2
CDS – People's Party	CDS–PP	19,243	14.00%	1
Left Bloc	BE	12,099	8.80%	0
Unitary Democratic Coalition	CDU	5,934	4.32%	0
New Democracy Party	ND	1,398	1.02%	0
Portuguese Workers' Communist Party	PCTP	1,192	0.87%	0
People's Monarchist Party	PPM	513	0.37%	0
Hope for Portugal Movement	MEP	399	0.29%	0
Pro-Life Party	PPV	372	0.27%	0
Merit and Society Movement	MMS	257	0.19%	0
The Earth Party Movement and Humanist Party	MPT-PH	247	0.18%	0
National Renewal Party	PNR	194	0.14%	0
Valid votes		137,481	100.00%	6
Blank votes		2,258	1.60%	
Rejected votes – other		1,744	1.23%	
Total polled		141,483	55.08%	
Registered electors		256,883		

The following candidates were elected: Abel Baptista (CDS-PP); Jorge Fão (PS); Luís Campos Ferreira (PSD); José Eduardo Martins (PSD); Rosalina Martins (PS); and Defensor Moura (PS).

===== 2005 =====
Results of the 2005 legislative election held on 20 February 2005:

Party		Votes	%	Seats
Socialist Party	PS	59,676	43.06%	3
Social Democratic Party	PSD	47,645	34.38%	2
CDS – People's Party	CDS–PP	16,205	11.69%	1
Left Bloc	BE	6,415	4.63%	0
Unitary Democratic Coalition	CDU	5,632	4.06%	0
New Democracy Party	ND	1,159	0.84%	0
Portuguese Workers' Communist Party	PCTP	1,002	0.72%	0
Humanist Party	PH	586	0.42%	0
National Renewal Party	PNR	263	0.19%	0
Valid votes		138,583	100.00%	6
Blank votes		2,214	1.56%	
Rejected votes – other		1,391	0.98%	
Total polled		142,188	61.24%	
Registered electors		232,185		

The following candidates were elected: Luís Amado (PS); Abel Baptista (CDS-PP); Jorge Fão (PS); Luís Campos Ferreira (PSD); José Eduardo Martins (PSD); and Rosalina Martins (PS).

===== 2002 =====
Results of the 2002 legislative election held on 17 March 2002:

Party		Votes	%	Seats
Social Democratic Party	PSD	63,386	46.42%	3
Socialist Party	PS	49,122	35.97%	3
CDS – People's Party	CDS–PP	14,283	10.46%	0
Unitary Democratic Coalition	CDU	4,844	3.55%	0
Left Bloc	BE	2,485	1.82%	0
Portuguese Workers' Communist Party	PCTP	870	0.64%	0
Humanist Party	PH	701	0.51%	0
People's Monarchist Party	PPM	541	0.40%	0
The Earth Party Movement	MPT	321	0.24%	0
Valid votes		136,553	100.00%	6
Blank votes		1,231	0.88%	
Rejected votes – other		1,484	1.07%	
Total polled		139,268	60.71%	
Registered electors		229,402		

The following candidates were elected: Carlos Antunes (PSD); Fernando Cabodeira (PS); Luís Campos Ferreira (PSD); Marques Júnior (PS); José Eduardo Martins (PSD); and Rosalina Martins (PS).

==== 1990s ====
===== 1999 =====
Results of the 1999 legislative election held on 10 October 1999:

Party		Votes	%	Seats
Socialist Party	PS	55,149	40.95%	3
Social Democratic Party	PSD	49,081	36.44%	2
CDS – People's Party	CDS–PP	19,249	14.29%	1
Unitary Democratic Coalition	CDU	6,886	5.11%	0
Left Bloc	BE	1,689	1.25%	0
Portuguese Workers' Communist Party	PCTP	729	0.54%	0
People's Monarchist Party	PPM	646	0.48%	0
The Earth Party Movement	MPT	449	0.33%	0
National Solidarity Party	PSN	446	0.33%	0
Humanist Party	PH	360	0.27%	0
Valid votes		134,684	100.00%	6
Blank votes		1,142	0.83%	
Rejected votes – other		1,391	1.01%	
Total polled		137,217	60.45%	
Registered electors		226,975		

The following candidates were elected: Francisco Rodrigues Araújo (PSD); Daniel Campelo (CDS-PP); Marques Júnior (PS); Carvalho Martins (PSD); Rui Solheiro (PS); and José Carlos Tavares (PS).

===== 1995 =====
Results of the 1995 legislative election held on 1 October 1995:

Party		Votes	%	Seats
Social Democratic Party	PSD	61,051	42.74%	3
Socialist Party	PS	56,234	39.37%	3
CDS – People's Party	CDS–PP	16,328	11.43%	0
Unitary Democratic Coalition	CDU	6,614	4.63%	0
Portuguese Workers' Communist Party	PCTP	753	0.53%	0
Popular Democratic Union	UDP	527	0.37%	0
People's Monarchist Party and The Earth Party Movement	PPM-MPT	496	0.35%	0
Revolutionary Socialist Party	PSR	491	0.34%	0
People's Party	PG	340	0.24%	0
Valid votes		142,834	100.00%	6
Blank votes		946	0.65%	
Rejected votes – other		1,272	0.88%	
Total polled		145,052	64.38%	
Registered electors		225,309		

The following candidates were elected: Marques Júnior (PS); Roleira Marinho (PSD); Carvalho Martins (PSD); Lucas Pires (PSD); Rui Solheiro (PS); and José Carlos Tavares (PS).

===== 1991 =====
Results of the 1991 legislative election held on 6 October 1991:

Party		Votes	%	Seats
Social Democratic Party	PSD	79,408	57.87%	4
Socialist Party	PS	35,212	25.66%	2
Social Democratic Centre Party	CDS	10,081	7.35%	0
Unitary Democratic Coalition	CDU	6,923	5.04%	0
National Solidarity Party	PSN	1,700	1.24%	0
Democratic Renewal Party	PRD	1,500	1.09%	0
Portuguese Workers' Communist Party	PCTP	913	0.67%	0
Revolutionary Socialist Party	PSR	766	0.56%	0
People's Monarchist Party	PPM	723	0.53%	0
Valid votes		137,226	100.00%	6
Blank votes		1,019	0.73%	
Rejected votes – other		1,444	1.03%	
Total polled		139,689	65.03%	
Registered electors		214,823		

The following candidates were elected: Lima Amorim (PSD); Marques da Costa (PS); Roleira Marinho (PSD); Carvalho Martins (PSD); Luís Marques Mendes (PSD); and Oliveira e Silva (PS).

==== 1980s ====
===== 1987 =====
Results of the 1987 legislative election held on 19 July 1987:

Party		Votes	%	Seats
Social Democratic Party	PSD	76,207	55.92%	5
Socialist Party	PS	28,351	20.80%	1
Social Democratic Centre Party	CDS	10,727	7.87%	0
Unitary Democratic Coalition	CDU	8,741	6.41%	0
Democratic Renewal Party	PRD	6,758	4.96%	0
People's Monarchist Party	PPM	1,078	0.79%	0
Portuguese Democratic Movement	MDP	831	0.61%	0
Christian Democratic Party	PDC	743	0.55%	0
Workers' Party of Socialist Unity	POUS	729	0.53%	0
Revolutionary Socialist Party	PSR	708	0.52%	0
Popular Democratic Union	UDP	641	0.47%	0
Communist Party (Reconstructed)	PC(R)	450	0.33%	0
Portuguese Workers' Communist Party	PCTP	314	0.23%	0
Valid votes		136,278	100.00%	6
Blank votes		1,442	1.03%	
Rejected votes – other		2,234	1.60%	
Total polled		139,954	70.10%	
Registered electors		199,636		

The following candidates were elected: Roleira Marinho (PSD); Fernandes Marques (PSD); Hilário Marques (PSD); João Oliveira Martins (PSD); Américo Sequeira (PSD); and Oliveira e Silva (PS).

===== 1985 =====
Results of the 1985 legislative election held on 6 October 1985:

Party		Votes	%	Seats
Social Democratic Party	PSD	47,253	34.50%	3
Socialist Party	PS	25,924	18.93%	1
Social Democratic Centre Party	CDS	23,368	17.06%	1
Democratic Renewal Party	PRD	22,904	16.72%	1
United People Alliance	APU	11,591	8.46%	0
Christian Democratic Party	PDC	1,508	1.10%	0
Popular Democratic Union	UDP	1,348	0.98%	0
Workers' Party of Socialist Unity	POUS	1,055	0.77%	0
Revolutionary Socialist Party	PSR	951	0.69%	0
Communist Party (Reconstructed)	PC(R)	663	0.48%	0
Portuguese Workers' Communist Party	PCTP	416	0.30%	0
Valid votes		136,981	100.00%	6
Blank votes		1,262	0.90%	
Rejected votes – other		2,755	1.95%	
Total polled		140,998	71.67%	
Registered electors		196,719		

The following candidates were elected: José Domingos (PSD); Abreu Lima (CDS); Henrique Mata (PSD); João de Deus Pinheiro (PSD); Oliveira e Silva (PS); and Agostinho de Sousa (PRD).

===== 1983 =====
Results of the 1983 legislative election held on 25 April 1983:

Party		Votes	%	Seats
Social Democratic Party	PSD	44,869	33.59%	3
Socialist Party	PS	44,711	33.48%	2
Social Democratic Centre Party	CDS	25,291	18.94%	1
United People Alliance	APU	13,572	10.16%	0
People's Monarchist Party	PPM	1,322	0.99%	0
Christian Democratic Party	PDC	1,233	0.92%	0
Socialist Workers League	LST	541	0.41%	0
Popular Democratic Union	UDP	525	0.39%	0
Portuguese Workers' Communist Party	PCTP	525	0.39%	0
Revolutionary Socialist Party	PSR	476	0.36%	0
Workers' Party of Socialist Unity	POUS	353	0.26%	0
Portuguese Marxist–Leninist Communist Organization	OCMLP	146	0.11%	0
Valid votes		133,564	100.00%	6
Blank votes		1,104	0.80%	
Rejected votes – other		2,913	2.12%	
Total polled		137,581	74.45%	
Registered electors		184,789		

The following candidates were elected: José Domingos (PSD); José Pita Guerreiro (PS); Abreu Lima (CDS); Manuel Filipe Loureiro (PS); Roleira Marinho (PSD); and Gaspar Pacheco (PSD).

===== 1980 =====
Results of the 1980 legislative election held on 5 October 1980:

Party		Votes	%	Seats
Democratic Alliance	AD	86,186	60.84%	5
Republican and Socialist Front	FRS	33,245	23.47%	1
United People Alliance	APU	14,548	10.27%	0
Workers' Party of Socialist Unity	POUS	2,187	1.54%	0
Labour Party	PT	1,351	0.95%	0
Popular Democratic Union	UDP	996	0.70%	0
Portuguese Marxist–Leninist Communist Organization	OCMLP	924	0.65%	0
Christian Democratic Party, Independent Movement for the National Reconstruction / Party of the Portuguese Right and National Front	PDC- MIRN/ PDP- FN	902	0.64%	0
Revolutionary Socialist Party	PSR	693	0.49%	0
Portuguese Workers' Communist Party	PCTP	623	0.44%	0
Valid votes		141,655	100.00%	6
Blank votes		979	0.67%	
Rejected votes – other		2,932	2.01%	
Total polled		145,566	81.91%	
Registered electors		177,716		

The following candidates were elected: Júlio Castro Caldas (AD); José Domingos (AD); Daniel Domingues (AD); Abreu Lima (AD); Roleira Marinho (AD); and Oliveira e Silva (FRS).

==== 1970s ====
===== 1979 =====
Results of the 1979 legislative election held on 2 December 1979:

Party		Votes	%	Seats
Democratic Alliance	AD	79,702	57.14%	4
Socialist Party	PS	36,186	25.94%	2
United People Alliance	APU	14,266	10.23%	0
Christian Democratic Party	PDC	2,483	1.78%	0
Portuguese Workers' Communist Party	PCTP	1,757	1.26%	0
Left-wing Union for the Socialist Democracy	UEDS	1,457	1.04%	0
Popular Democratic Union	UDP	1,312	0.94%	0
Revolutionary Socialist Party	PSR	1,200	0.86%	0
Portuguese Marxist–Leninist Communist Organization	OCMLP	1,125	0.81%	0
Valid votes		139,488	100.00%	6
Blank votes		1,356	0.93%	
Rejected votes – other		4,567	3.14%	
Total polled		145,411	84.38%	
Registered electors		172,323		

The following candidates were elected: Júlio Castro Caldas (AD); José Domingos (AD); Abreu Lima (AD); Manuel Tito de Morais (PS); Henrique Barrilaro Ruas (AD); and Vitor Vasques (PS).

===== 1976 =====
Results of the 1976 legislative election held on 25 April 1976:

Party		Votes	%	Seats
Democratic People's Party	PPD	42,519	34.90%	3
Socialist Party	PS	33,094	27.16%	2
Social Democratic Centre Party	CDS	30,437	24.98%	2
Portuguese Communist Party	PCP	8,611	7.07%	0
People's Socialist Front	FSP	1,314	1.08%	0
Christian Democratic Party	PDC	1,192	0.98%	0
Popular Democratic Union	UDP	1,110	0.91%	0
People's Monarchist Party	PPM	995	0.82%	0
Movement of Socialist Left	MES	881	0.72%	0
Internationalist Communist League	LCI	583	0.48%	0
Re-Organized Movement of the Party of the Proletariat	MRPP	399	0.33%	0
Worker–Peasant Alliance	AOC	380	0.31%	0
Communist Party of Portugal (Marxist–Leninist)	PCP(ML)	314	0.26%	0
Workers' Revolutionary Party	PRT	0	0.00%	0
Valid votes		121,829	100.00%	7
Rejected votes		7,921	6.10%	
Total polled		129,750	79.14%	
Registered electors		163,949		

The following candidates were elected: Eugénio Anacoreta Correia (CDS); José Rui Fernandes (PPD); Amantino Lemos (PPD); Abreu Lima (CDS); Manuel Tito de Morais (PS); Américo Sequeira (PPD); and Oliveira e Silva (PS).
