= Alfonsine Ordinances =

15th-century compilation of Portuguese law

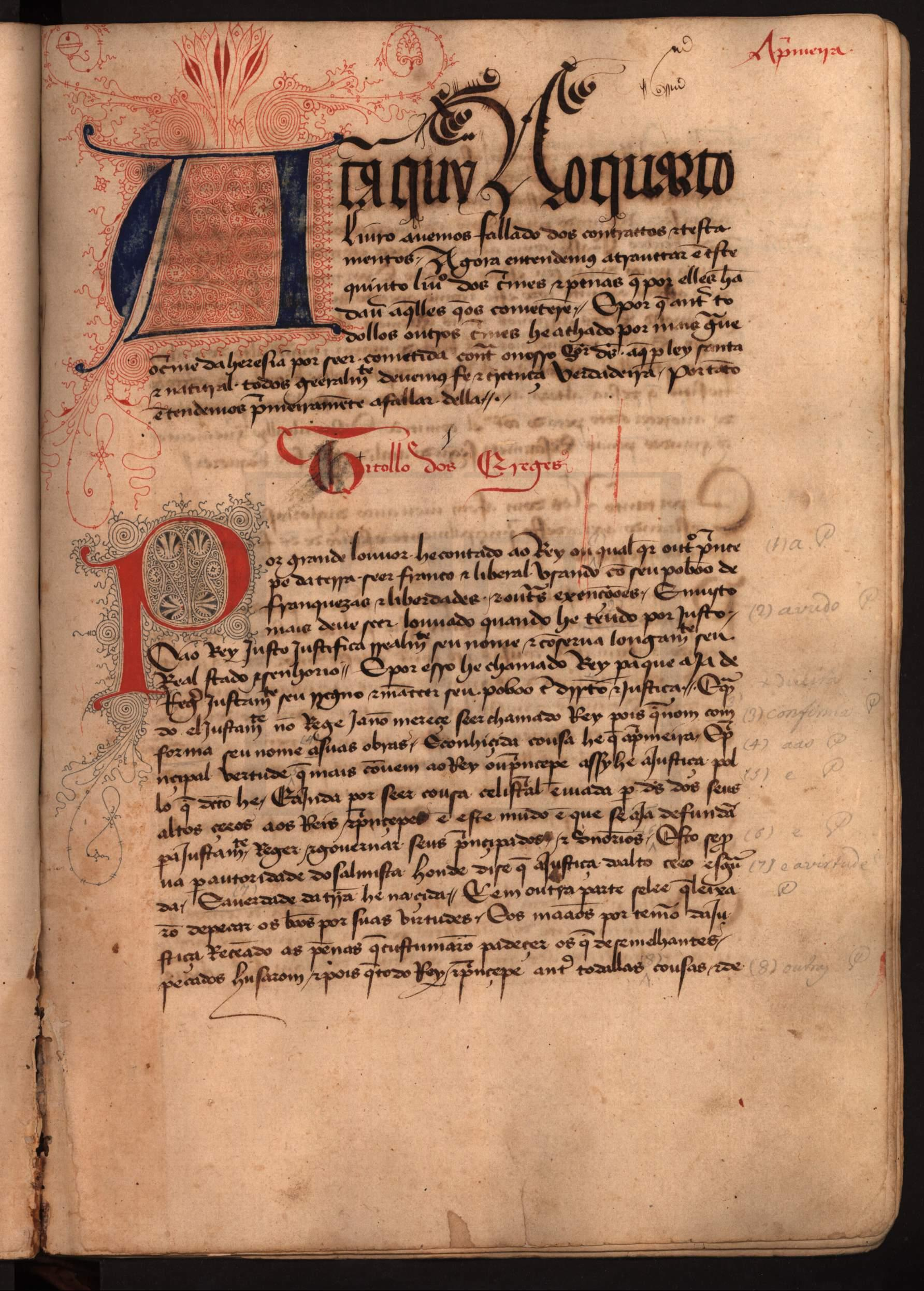
- Núcleo Antigo Códice 14, book V, folio 1 (recto)

Afonso V of Portugal
- Territorial extent: Portuguese Empire
- Enacted by: Afonso V of Portugal
- Enacted: 1446 or 1447
- Repealed: 1521

Repealed by
- Manueline Ordinances
- Status: Repealed

The Alfonsine Ordinances (Portuguese: Ordenações Afonsinas) were a complete restatement of Portuguese law, enacted in 1446 or 1447 during the reign of the Portuguese King Afonso V (r. 1438–1477).

The five books of the Ordinances were the first codification of Portuguese law and established a legal hierarchy between Portuguese royal laws, Roman law and Canon law.

In 1521, they were succeeded by the Manueline Ordinances (Ordenações Manuelinas) of Manuel I.

== History ==
In the beginning of the 15th century, Portuguese law was in a state of confusion, even the courts were unsure which royal laws were still valid and should be applied to a case. Furthermore, the legal hierarchy between these royal laws and Roman and Canon law was unclear. To rectify this confusion at least in part, John I of Portugal (r. 1385–1433) ordered with a carta régia, dated 18 April 1426, what counted as "Roman law" before Portuguese courts. He decreed that Roman law as stated in the Corpus Iuris Civilis should be applied and, when it contained no answer to the issue in question, the annotations on the Corpus Iuris Civilis contained in the glossa ordinaria by Accursius should be used. When even the glossa ordinaria was of no help, the commentary on the Corpus Iuris Civilis by Bartolus was to be given precedence. With this declaration, John I only clarified how the secondarily applicable Roman law was to be understood; he did not clarify the legal hierarchy between royal Portuguese, Canon and Roman law.

To rectify this, John I later commissioned the first systematic compilation, reformulation and updating of the primarily applicable Portuguese law. This commission was given to João Mendes (the corregador da corte) and, after Mendes death, to Rui Fernandes, who finished it on 28 July 1446. After a revision of the compilation by a commission, the work was completed in July 1446 and given to King Afonso V, who had succeed John I and Edward as king of Portugal. Despite lending the ordinances its name, King Afoso V had little influence on them as they were completed during his minority – he was born in 1432 – and the regency of his uncle Peter, the Duke of Coimbra.

Due to a court document of August 1447, which references the Alfonsine Ordinances, legal scholars assume that they entered into force at the end of 1446 or the beginning of 1447. Their diffusion into Portugal proved, however, difficult, as they were completed before the invention of the printing press.

In 1521, the Alfonsine Ordinances were succeeded by the Manueline Ordinances (Ordenações Manuelinas) named after King Manuel I.

== Content ==
=== General content and structure ===
Legal scholars consider the Alfonsine Ordinances to be the first codification of Portuguese law and the foundation for its development for centuries afterwards. They were, however, far from being a complete system of law and scholars speculate that only the Chancelaria Régia had a complete set of all five books of the Ordinances. Its sources were the royal Portuguese laws, Canon law, the case law of the higher courts of Portugal, the Siete Partidas, Roman law and local customs. The structuring of the Ordinances into five books might have been influenced by the 1234 Decretals of Gregory IX.

The first book of the Alfonsine Ordinances considers the state and its administration. The second book deals with the rights of the Catholic Church, the King and the nobility. The third book contains the rules of civil procedure, while the fourth book states the substantive private law. The final fifth book considers criminal law and procedure.

An important clarification of the Alfonsine Ordinances was the establishment of a clear legal hierarchy in Portuguese law: Firstly, the royal Portuguese laws were supreme. When they contained no answer, a distinction was made between temporal (de ordem temporal) and spiritual questions (de ordem espíritual). In case of the former, Roman law was to be applied, while in case of the later, Canon law was applicable. An exception was, however, stated in the case of "sinful results": If the application of Roman law resulted in resultados pecados (sinful results) than Canon law was again applicable (book II, title 9). Roman law was to be applied according to the glossa ordinaria of Accursius and the opinion of Bartolus. If even these authorities did not help to solve the case than the King himself should decide it (book II, title 9).

=== Restrictions on Jews and Muslims ===
The Alfonsine Ordinances contained special restrictions for Jews and Muslims, for example forcing them to wear a distinctive symbol or badge on their clothing (for Jews: book II, title 86; for Muslims: book II, title 103). Other examples were that Jews were generally not allowed inside the house of a Christian woman when her husband was absent (book II, title 67), and when Jews or Muslims disguised their identity "with the intention of sinning with Christian women" they would be punished by enslavement (book V, titles 25 and 26).

== Preservation and editions ==
=== Manuscripts ===
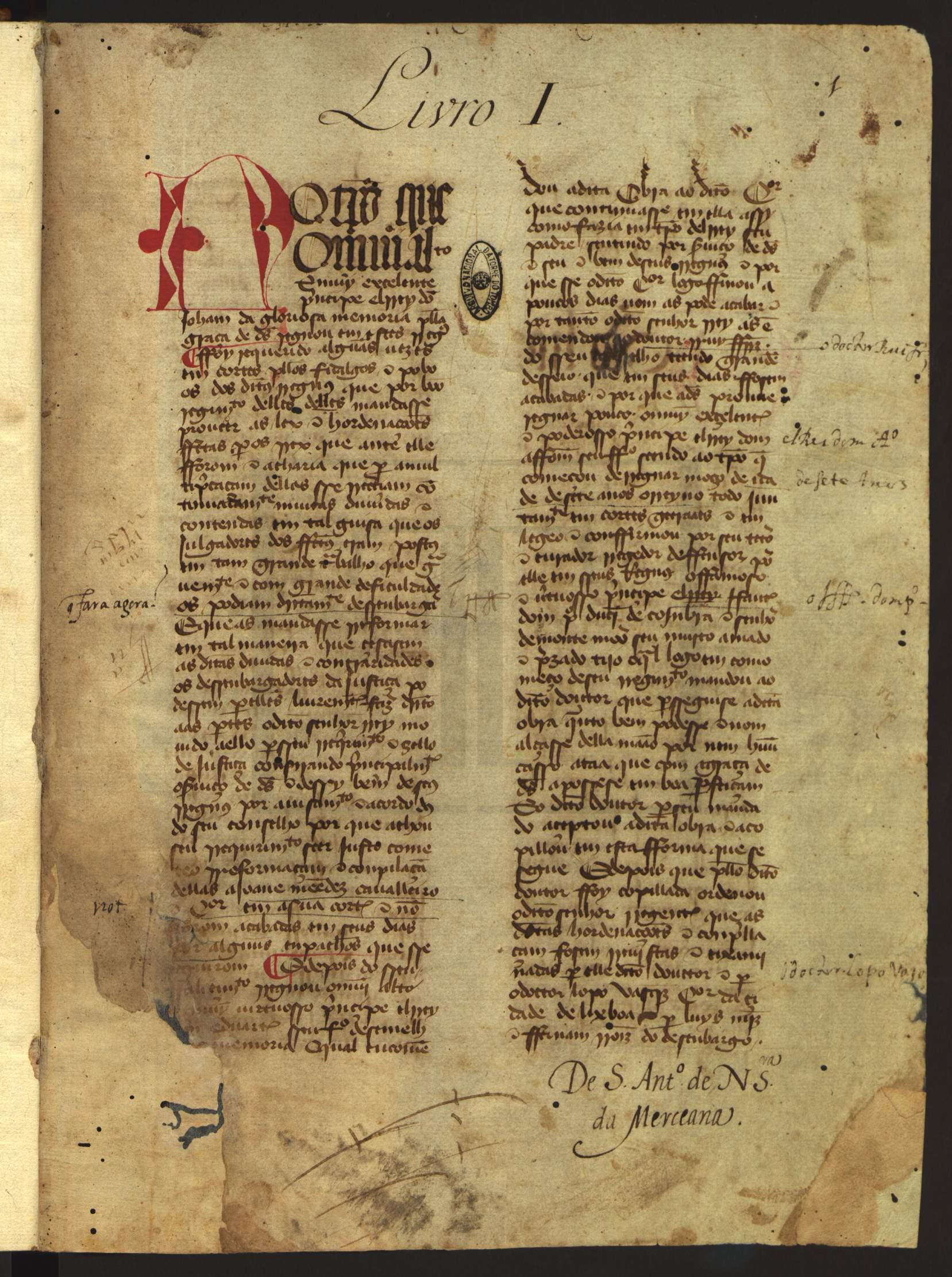
Folio 1r of codex Núcleo Antigo Códice 4 containing the beginning of book 1

The original manuscript of the Alfonsine Ordinances, which was deposited in the royal chancery, is lost. It is presumed that it must have been deliberately discarded as "useless" after a calligraphic Leitura Nova copy was done in the early 16th century.

However, seven direct copies done by hand survive that were made shortly after promulgation, probably all in the third quarter of the 15th century; none of those complete. An eighth manuscript, made in the first half of the 16th century, completes the set, with later copies providing no further insight. The manuscripts, which were given a siglum in the 1984 edition, are:

Manuscripts of the Alfonsine Ordinances
Siglum	Repository and shelfmark	Codex	Books	Date	Notes	Ref.
TT/MC (one codex)	Torre do Tombo National Archive, Leis e ordenações, Núcleo Antigo Códice 4	Códice 4	I and III, bound together without II	15th century	Recovered from the Convento de Santo António (Merceana) in 1777. Each book was copied by a different hand.	
TT/LN (three codices)	Torre do Tombo National Archive, Leis e ordenações, Núcleo Antigo Códices 5–7	Códice 5	II	16th century	Originally part of the royal archive and written in the calligraphic Leitura Nova style. The writing was carefully done in the first codex (Códice 5) and carelessly and incomplete in the other two (Códices 6 and 7). Transposed into 16th century orthography, with numerous errors and omissions. The copy is the only alternative to TT/MC for book III.	
TT/LN (three codices)	Torre do Tombo National Archive, Leis e ordenações, Núcleo Antigo Códices 5–7	Códice 6	III	16th century	Originally part of the royal archive and written in the calligraphic Leitura Nova style. The writing was carefully done in the first codex (Códice 5) and carelessly and incomplete in the other two (Códices 6 and 7). Transposed into 16th century orthography, with numerous errors and omissions. The copy is the only alternative to TT/MC for book III.	
TT/LN (three codices)	Torre do Tombo National Archive, Leis e ordenações, Núcleo Antigo Códices 5–7	Códice 7	IV	16th century	Originally part of the royal archive and written in the calligraphic Leitura Nova style. The writing was carefully done in the first codex (Códice 5) and carelessly and incomplete in the other two (Códices 6 and 7). Transposed into 16th century orthography, with numerous errors and omissions. The copy is the only alternative to TT/MC for book III.	
TT/LX (one codex)	Torre do Tombo National Archive, Leis e ordenações, Núcleo Antigo Códice 8	Códice 8	II	15th century	Found among refuse in the lower rooms of the Torre do Tombo National Archive and saved by Jorge da Cunha on 10 January 1631. The copy only contains book II.	
TT/CP (four codices)	Torre do Tombo National Archive, Leis e ordenações, Núcleo Antigo Códices 9–12	Códice 9	I	15th century	Copied for the municipal council of Porto in the third quarter of the 15th century (judging by the typeface, the spelling and the paper watermarks) and brought to the Torre do Tombo National Archive in 1784. The copy bears an ownership note of the council of Porto and a Latin explicit. Of all the copyists, the copyist of these codices appears to have read and transmitted the original text most intelligently. The manuscript is considered to be the best and most complete witness to the ordinances.	
TT/CP (four codices)	Torre do Tombo National Archive, Leis e ordenações, Núcleo Antigo Códices 9–12	Códice 10	II	15th century	Copied for the municipal council of Porto in the third quarter of the 15th century (judging by the typeface, the spelling and the paper watermarks) and brought to the Torre do Tombo National Archive in 1784. The copy bears an ownership note of the council of Porto and a Latin explicit. Of all the copyists, the copyist of these codices appears to have read and transmitted the original text most intelligently. The manuscript is considered to be the best and most complete witness to the ordinances.	
TT/CP (four codices)	Torre do Tombo National Archive, Leis e ordenações, Núcleo Antigo Códices 9–12	Códice 11	IV	15th century	Copied for the municipal council of Porto in the third quarter of the 15th century (judging by the typeface, the spelling and the paper watermarks) and brought to the Torre do Tombo National Archive in 1784. The copy bears an ownership note of the council of Porto and a Latin explicit. Of all the copyists, the copyist of these codices appears to have read and transmitted the original text most intelligently. The manuscript is considered to be the best and most complete witness to the ordinances.	
TT/CP (four codices)	Torre do Tombo National Archive, Leis e ordenações, Núcleo Antigo Códices 9–12	Códice 12	V	15th century	Copied for the municipal council of Porto in the third quarter of the 15th century (judging by the typeface, the spelling and the paper watermarks) and brought to the Torre do Tombo National Archive in 1784. The copy bears an ownership note of the council of Porto and a Latin explicit. Of all the copyists, the copyist of these codices appears to have read and transmitted the original text most intelligently. The manuscript is considered to be the best and most complete witness to the ordinances.	
TT/CS (two codices)	Torre do Tombo National Archive, Leis e ordenações, Núcleo Antigo Códices 13–14	Códice 13	I and II	15th century	Sent from the council of Santarém to the Torre do Tombo National Archive in 1776. Books I and II and IV and V are bound together. The manuscript is considered to be the second best in quality.	
TT/CS (two codices)	Torre do Tombo National Archive, Leis e ordenações, Núcleo Antigo Códices 13–14	Códice 14	IV and V	15th century	Sent from the council of Santarém to the Torre do Tombo National Archive in 1776. Books I and II and IV and V are bound together. The manuscript is considered to be the second best in quality.	
AJ/FR (one codex)	Biblioteca da Ajuda, 44-XIII-37	44-XIII-37	Introduction to I and the Regimento da Guerra	15th century	Codex in the Biblioteca da Ajuda. It only contains an introduction to book I, the Regimento da Guerra, corresponding to titles 51–72 of the 1792 edition, and some letters.	
BN/AL (one codex)	National Library of Portugal, Alcobacenses 222	Alc. 222	II (with additions)	15th century	The codex only contains book II (with additions) and was purchased in Lisbon in 1566 by a certain António Rodrigues Mata, from Lamego. The writing has been described as hasty and careless.	
LX/AM (one codex)	Lisbon Municipal Archive, Chancelaria Régia, cod. 23	CHR 23	IV	15th century	The codex only contains book IV and the first three folios are missing. Its watermark is datable to 1450–1460.	

=== Printing ===
==== The edition of 1792 ====
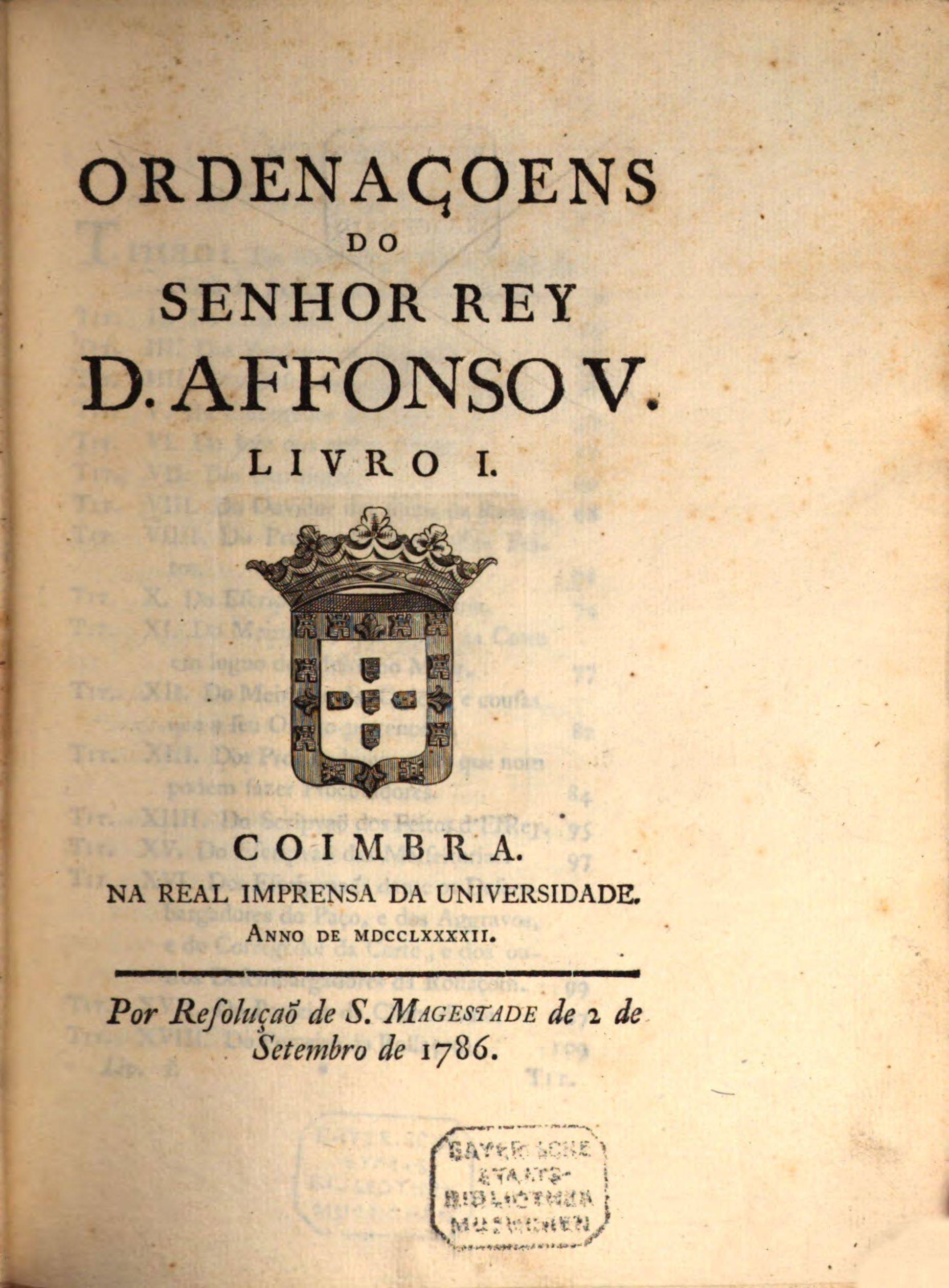
Front matter of the 1792 edition of the Alfonsine Ordinances stored in the Bavarian State Library

The Alfonsine Ordinances were never printed while in force. Their first printing under the title Ordenaçoens do Senhor Rey D. Affonso V. was done in 1792 by the University of Coimbra as a part of the Collecção da Legislação Antiga e Moderna do Reino de Portugal, established by a royal resolution dated 2 September 1786. The exclusive right to print the Ordinances, which had belonged to the Monastery of São Vicente de Fora, had beforehand passed to the University by a royal charter dated 16 December 1773. The editor of the 1792 edition was Luís Joaquim Correia da Silva.

As a basis for books I, II, IV and V of this edition the manuscript TT/CP was chosen because it was considered to be most accurate and least incomplete. For book III, however, the editor used manuscript TT/LN as its basis. Although it was the original intent of the edition to preserve the archaic and inconsistent spelling and grammar of the manuscripts, the edition in the end included modifications to both while preserving the content faithfully.

- Ordenaçoens do Senhor Rey D. Affonso V. Collecçaõ de legislaçaõ antiga e moderna do reino de Portugal. Parte I. Da legislaçaõ antiga (in Portuguese). Coimbra: University of Coimbra. 1792. OCLC 23368268.

==== The 1984 reprint ====
In 1984, the Calouste Gulbenkian Foundation produced a facsimile edition of the 1792 edition, accompanied by new introductory matter surveying the surviving manuscripts and assessing the quality of the 1792 text. Before the production of the 1984 reprint a new, critical edition was considered as an alternative, but rejected as too slow and costly.

- Ordenações Afonsinas (PDF) (in Portuguese). Vol. I. Lisbon: Calouste Gulbenkian Foundation. 1984.
- Ordenações Afonsinas (PDF) (in Portuguese). Vol. II. Lisbon: Calouste Gulbenkian Foundation. 1984.
- Ordenações Afonsinas (PDF) (in Portuguese). Vol. III. Lisbon: Calouste Gulbenkian Foundation. 1984.
- Ordenações Afonsinas (PDF) (in Portuguese). Vol. IV. Lisbon: Calouste Gulbenkian Foundation. 1984.
- Ordenações Afonsinas (PDF) (in Portuguese). Vol. V. Lisbon: Calouste Gulbenkian Foundation. 1984.
