= Eduardo Teixeira (politician) =

Portuguese economist and politician (born 1972)

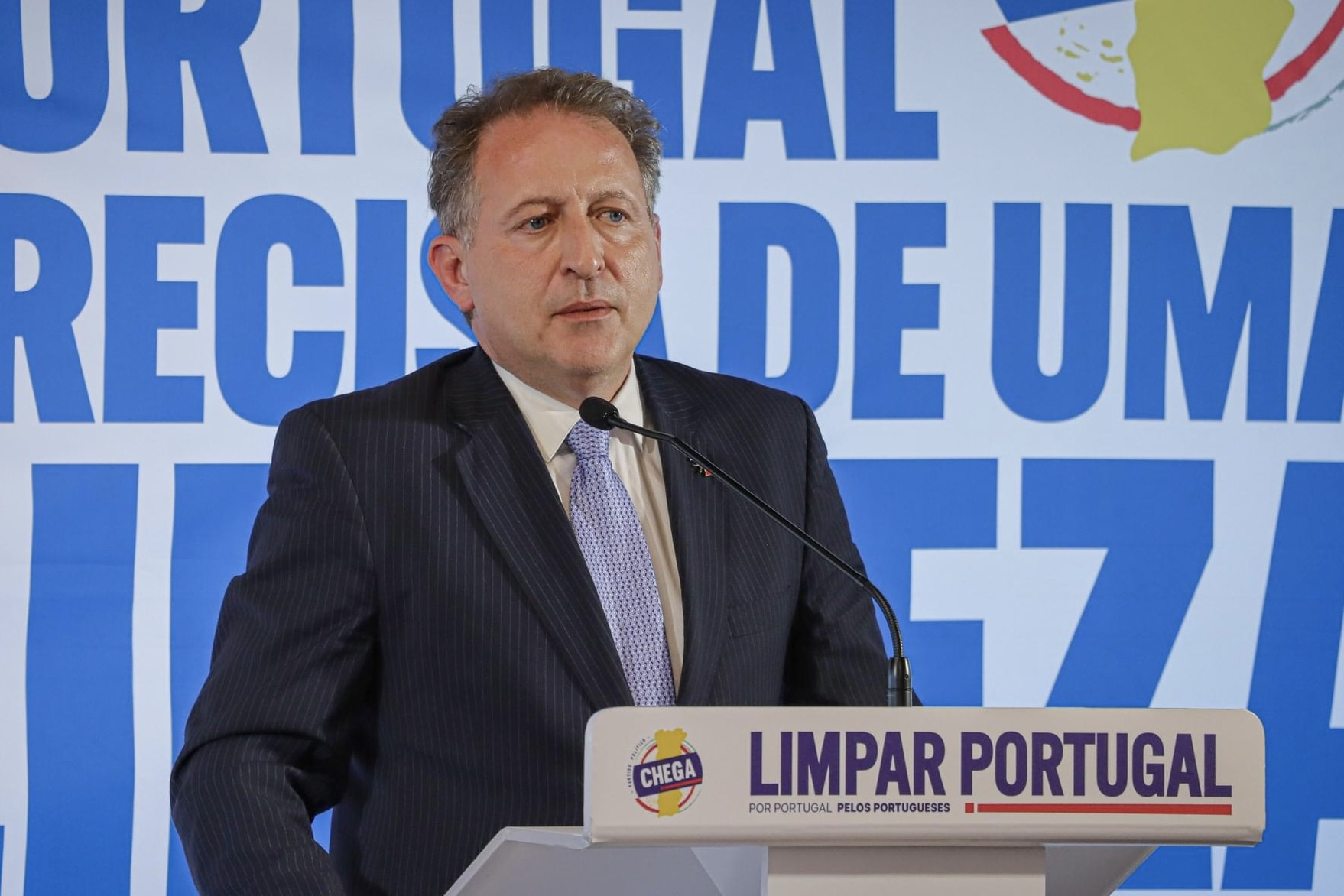
- Eduardo Teixeira in 2024

Member of the Assembly of the Republic
- Incumbent
- Assumed office 26 March 2024
- Constituency: Viana do Castelo
- In office 25 October 2019 – 28 March 2022
- Constituency: Viana do Castelo
- In office 22 October 2015 – 22 October 2015
- Constituency: Viana do Castelo

Member of the Viana do Castelo City Council
- Incumbent
- Assumed office 15 October 2021
- In office 16 October 2013 – 20 October 2017

Member of the Viana do Castelo Municipal Assembly
- In office 16 December 2001 – 11 October 2009

Personal details
- Born: Eduardo Alexandre Ribeiro Gonçalves Teixeira; 25 June 1972 (age 54) Viana do Castelo, Portugal
- Party: Chega (2024–present)
- Other political affiliations: Social Democratic Party (1991–2024)
- Spouse: Francine Teixeira
- Education: University of Porto
- Occupation: Economist • politician

Eduardo Alexandre Ribeiro Gonçalves Teixeira (born 25 June 1972) is a Portuguese economist and politician. He was a member of the Assembly of the Republic, for the Social Democratic Party, in the XII and XIV legislature. He is a member of the City Council of Viana do Castelo, since 2021.

In 2024 he was announced, as head of the list for Viana do Castelo for the CHEGA party, for the 2024 legislative elections, being one of the five former and current PSD MPs running for CHEGA.

On 10 March 2024 he was elected as member of the Assembly of the Republic by CHEGA, for the Viana do Castelo constituency.
