= Manueline Ordinances =

Collections of Laws in 16th Century Portugal

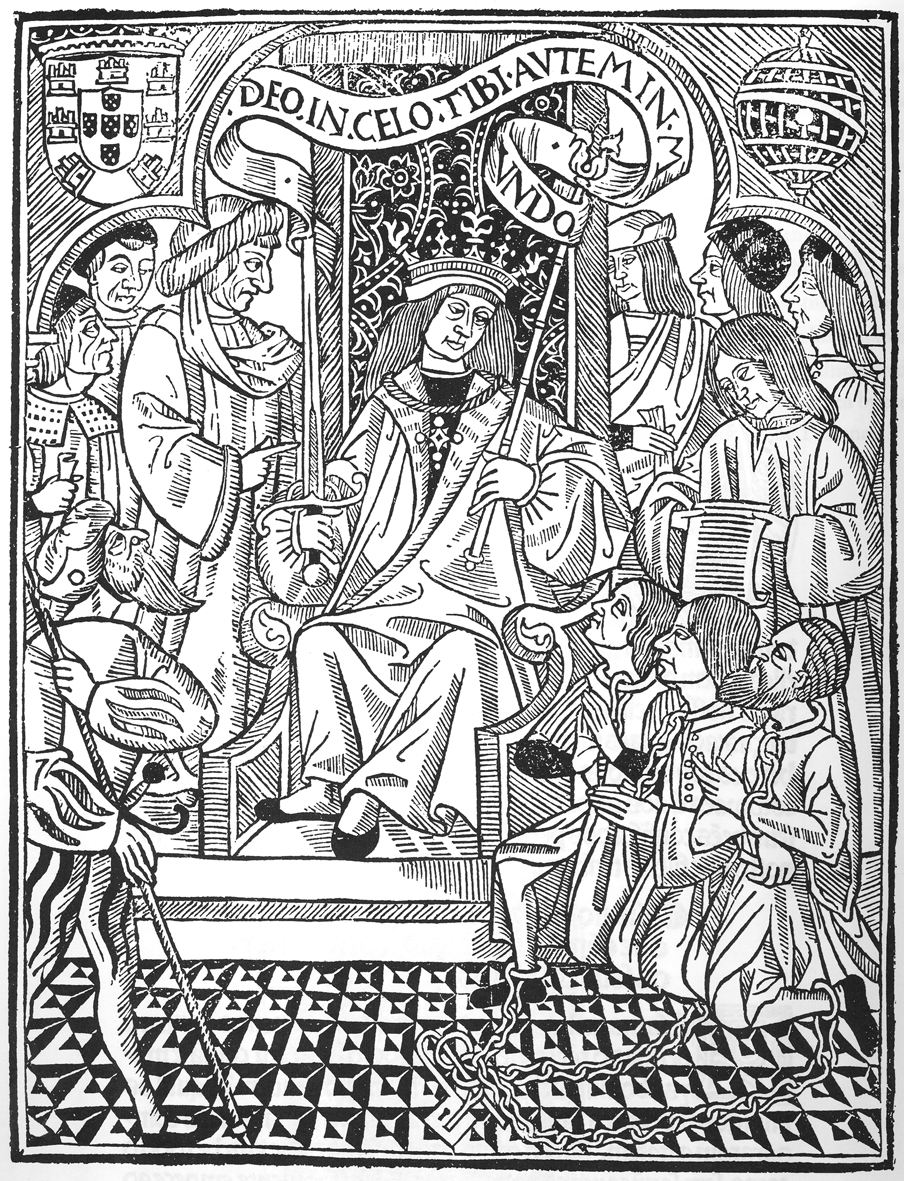
King Manuel exercising justice; woodcut from the 1514 edition of the Manueline Ordinances. The phylactery above the king reads Deo in celo tibi autem in mundo ("as to God in Heaven, to you also on Earth").

The Manueline Ordinances (Portuguese: Ordenações Manuelinas) were an exhaustive compilation of the entire legal system in Portugal and its colonial possessions that was issued in 1512 by King Manuel I as part of his reform of the public administration. The Manueline Ordinances saw three different revisions (known as the "first system", "second system", and "third system" of the Ordinances).

The Manueline Ordinances superseded the Ordenações Afonsinas (King Afonso V, 1446), and were in force until they were replaced by the Philippine Ordinances (King Philip I, 1595).
