= Portuguese Workers' Communist Party =

Communist political party in Portugal

Portuguese Workers' Communist Party/Reorganizing Movement of the Party of the Proletariat Partido Comunista dos Trabalhadores Portugueses/Movimento Reorganizativo do Partido do Proletariado
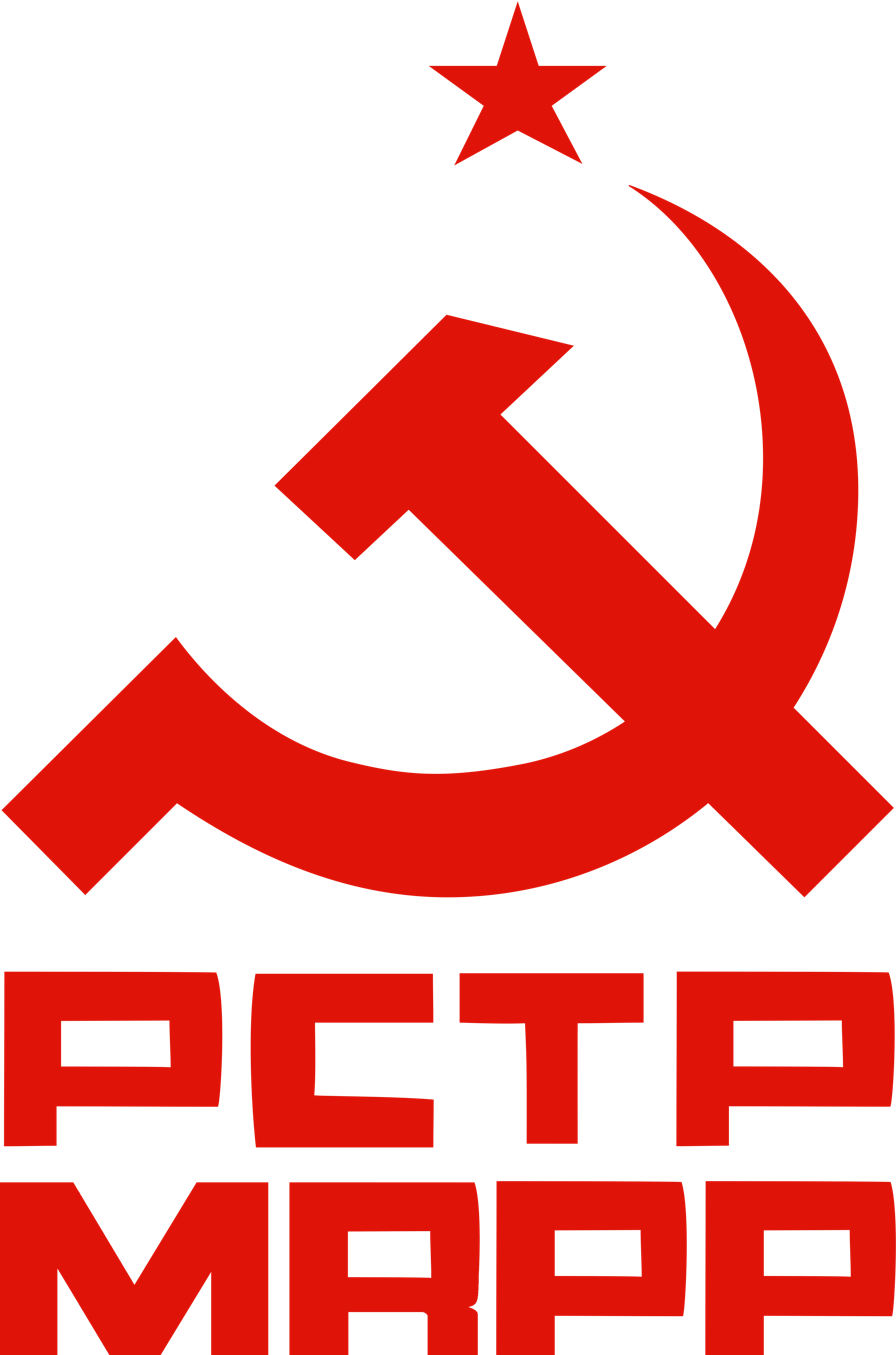
- Abbreviation: PCTP/MRPP
- Leader: Maria Cidália Guerreiro
- Founded: 1970
- Headquarters: Lisbon
- Youth wing: Marxist–Leninist Students Federation (until 1980s)
- Ideology: Communism; Marxism-Leninism; Maoism; Anti-revisionism
- Political position: Far-left
- Colors: Red
- Assembly of the Republic: 0 / 230
- European Parliament: 0 / 21
- Regional parliaments: 0 / 104
- Local Government: 0 / 2,086

Election symbol
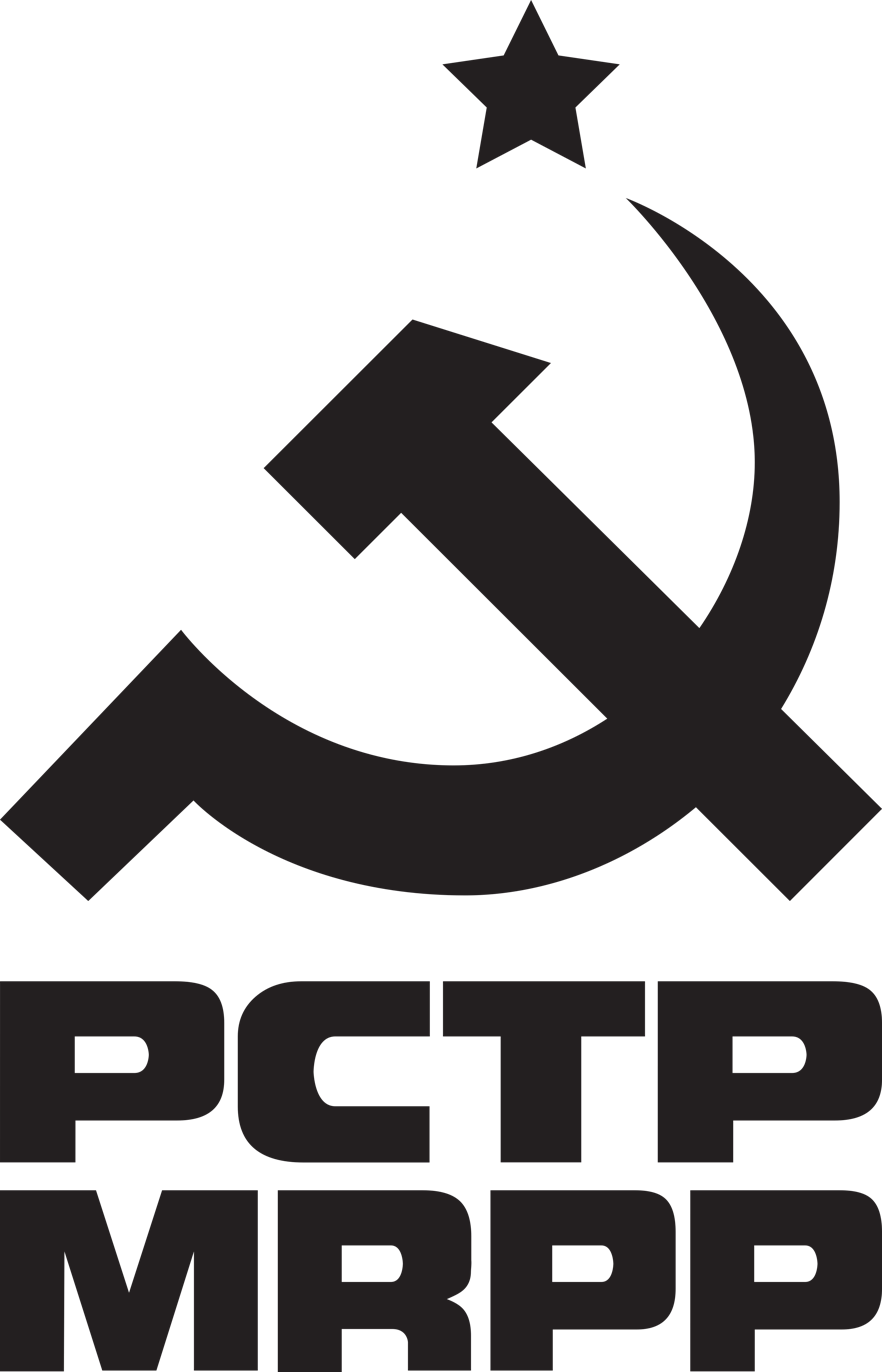

Party flag
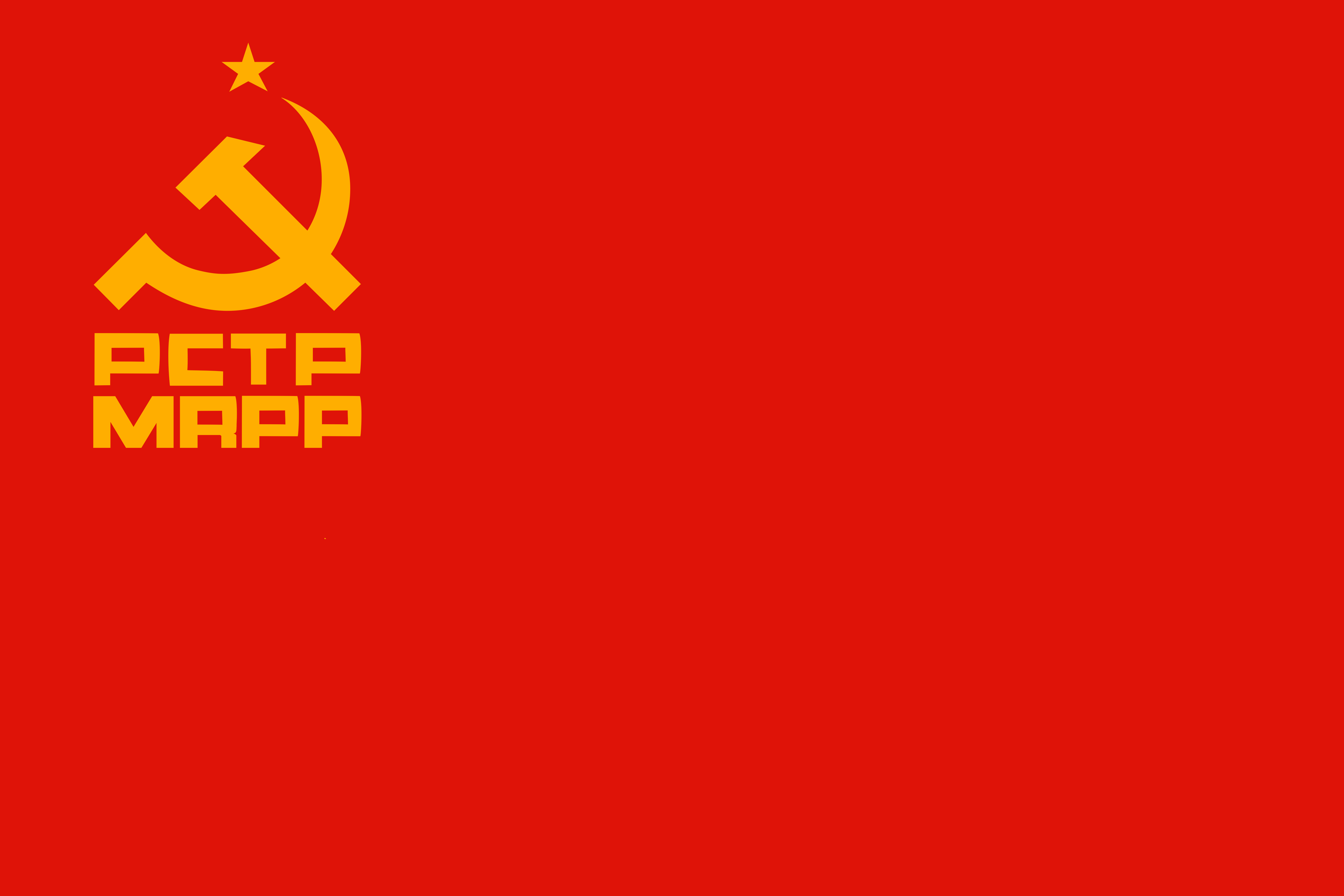

Website
- lutapopularonline.org

The Portuguese Workers' Communist Party/Reorganizing Movement of the Party of the Proletariat (Portuguese: Partido Comunista dos Trabalhadores Portugueses/Movimento Reorganizativo do Partido do Proletariado, PCTP/MRPP) (Note: Portuguese pronunciation: [pɐɾˈtiðu kumuˈniʃtɐ ðuʃ tɾɐβɐʎɐˈðoɾɨʃ puɾtuˈɣezɨʃ ‖ muviˈmẽtu ʁi.ɔɾɣɐnizɐˈtivu ðu pɐɾˈtiðu ðu pɾulɨtɐɾiˈaðu]) is a Maoist political party in Portugal.

== History and overview ==
The party was founded in 1970 as the Movimento Reorganizativo do Partido do Proletariado (MRPP), led by Arnaldo Matos. It changed its name to the Portuguese Workers' Communist Party in 1976.

The PCTP–MRPP has held a Maoist political orientation since its foundation. In 1971, the party began to publish a newspaper called Luta Popular (People's Struggle), directed by Saldanha Sanches. The party was among the most active resistance movements before the Carnation Revolution, especially among students in Lisbon. After the revolution, the MRPP achieved fame for its large murals. The party became intensely active during 1974 and 1975, and at that time boasted members who later became important political figures, including José Manuel Barroso and Fernando Rosas, who subsequently left the party. The party, however, never managed to elect a single Member of Parliament in legislative elections.

During the revolutionary period of 1974 and 1975, the MRPP was accused by the Portuguese Communist Party of being an agent of the CIA, a belief that was fueled by cooperation between the MRPP and the Socialist Party against the communist program defended by the Portuguese Communist Party.

The party's youth wing, now extinct, was the Marxist–Leninist Students' Federation, to which José Manuel Barroso, a future Prime Minister from the centre-right Social Democratic Party, briefly belonged.

The party entered a phase of internal turmoil following the 2015 legislative elections, with its leader António Garcia Pereira leaving the party. Details about the internal functioning of the party became difficult to obtain, since none of the official contacts responded to contacts, and even the official headquarters seemed to no longer be functioning. An extraordinary congress was announced, but it is unknown if it really happened. Some sources claim the party is now operating at a clandestine level.

Despite this, the party contested the 2017 local elections, gaining 12,387 votes (0.24%) but losing the two council seats it had held.

Arnaldo Matos, founder of the PCTP/MRPP and its leader during the 1970s and 1980s, died on 22 February 2019.

== Election results ==
=== Assembly of the Republic ===
Election	Leader	Votes	%	Seats	+/-	Government
1976	Arnaldo Matos	36,200	0.66 (#7)	0 / 263		No seats
1979	Arnaldo Matos	53,268	0.89 (#6)	0 / 250	0	No seats
1980	Arnaldo Matos	35,409	0.59 (#8)	0 / 250	0	No seats
1983	Arnaldo Matos	20,995	0.37(#9)	0 / 250	0	No seats
1985	Arnaldo Matos	19,943	0.34 (#9)	0 / 250	0	No seats
1987	Arnaldo Matos	20,800	0.37 (#11)	0 / 250	0	No seats
1991	António Garcia Pereira	48,542	0.85 (#7)	0 / 230	0	No seats
1995	António Garcia Pereira	41,137	0.70 (#5)	0 / 230	0	No seats
1999	António Garcia Pereira	40,006	0.74 (#6)	0 / 230	0	No seats
2002	António Garcia Pereira	36,193	0.66 (#6)	0 / 230	0	No seats
2005	António Garcia Pereira	48,186	0.84 (#6)	0 / 230	0	No seats
2009	António Garcia Pereira	52,784	0.93 (#6)	0 / 230	0	No seats
2011	António Garcia Pereira	62,683	1.12 (#6)	0 / 230	0	No seats
2015	António Garcia Pereira	59,995	1.11 (#7)	0 / 230	0	No seats
2019	Cidália Guerreiro	36,118	0.69 (#11)	0 / 230	0	No seats
2022	Cidália Guerreiro	13,016	0.20 (#11)	0 / 230	0	No seats
2024	Cidália Guerreiro	15,499	0.24 (#13)	0 / 230	0	No seats
2025	Cidália Guerreiro	11,896	0.19 (#13)	0 / 230	0	No seats

=== Presidential ===
Election	Candidate	Votes	%	Result
1976	Supported António Ramalho Eanes			Won ✓
1980	Supported António Ramalho Eanes			Won ✓
1986	No candidate			
1991	No candidate			
1996	Supported Jorge Sampaio			Won ✓
2001	António Garcia Pereira	68,900	1.9 (#5)	Lost ✗
2006	António Garcia Pereira	23,983	0.4 (#6)	Lost ✗
2011	Supported Manuel Alegre			Lost ✗
2016	Supported António Sampaio da Nóvoa			Lost ✗
2021	No candidate			
2026	No candidate			

=== European Parliament ===
Election	Leader	Votes	%	Seats	+/-
1987		19,475	0.4 (#12)	0 / 24	
1989	António Garcia Pereira	26,682	0.6 (#10)	0 / 24	0
1994	António Garcia Pereira	24,022	0.8 (#5)	0 / 25	0
1999	António Garcia Pereira	30,446	0.9 (#6)	0 / 25	0
2004	Orlando Alves	36,294	1.1 (#5)	0 / 24	0
2009	Orlando Alves	42,940	1.2 (#7)	0 / 22	0
2014	Leopoldo Mesquita	54,708	1.7 (#8)	0 / 21	0
2019	Luís Júdice	27,223	0.8 (#12)	0 / 21	0

== See also ==
- Aurora Rodrigues
- Politics of Portugal
- List of political parties in Portugal
- Marxist–Leninist Students' Federation
- List of anti-revisionist groups
