= Tiago Brandão Rodrigues =

Portuguese politician

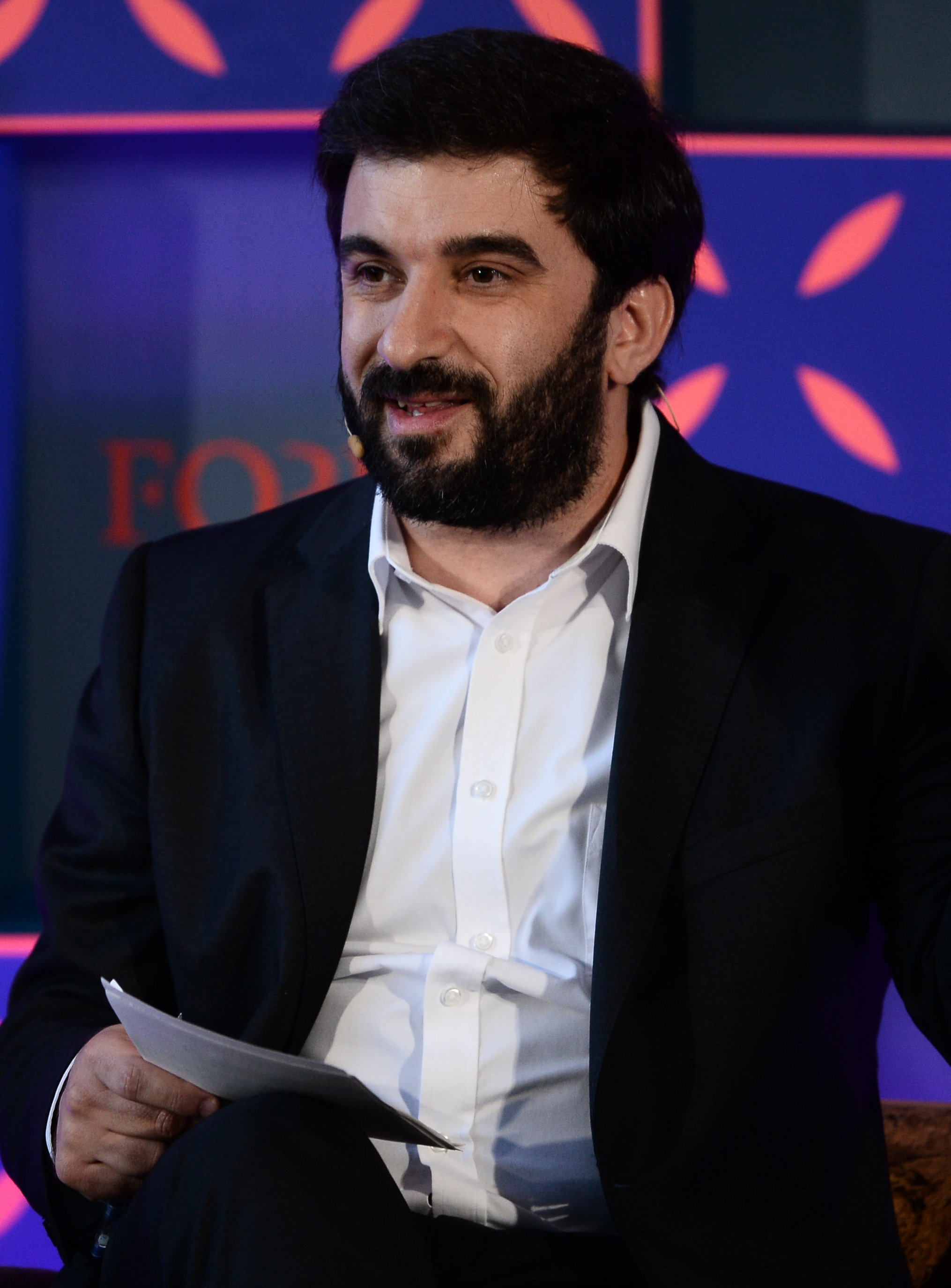
- Rodrigues in 2017

Member of the Assembly of the Republic
- Incumbent
- Assumed office 29 March 2022
- Constituency: Viana do Castelo

Minister of Education
- In office 26 November 2015 – 30 March 2022
- Preceded by: Margarida Mano
- Succeeded by: João Marques da Costa

Personal details
- Born: 1977 (age 48–49) Viana do Castelo, Portugal
- Party: Socialist Party
- Education: University of Coimbra

Tiago Brandão Rodrigues (born 1977) is a Portuguese politician who served as Minister of Education from 26 November 2015 until 30 March 2022. He has a PhD in biochemistry from the University of Coimbra. Rodrigues was elected by the Viana do Castelo constituency to the Assembly of the Republic in 2015 and 2022.

== UEFA inquiry into the 2022 Champions League Final chaos ==
On 30 May, UEFA announced they were commissioning an independent report into the chaotic events surrounding the 2022 UEFA Champions League Final to examine the decision making, responsibility and behaviours of all entities involved in the events at the Stade de France, in which Liverpool supporters were tear-gassed by French Police, and would be led by Rodrigues on a pro bono basis. The report will be made public upon its completion, with UEFA evaluating the next steps to take.
