= José Eduardo Martins (politician) =

Portuguese lawyer and politician

Member of the Assembly of the Republic
- In office 25 October 1999 – 4 April 2002
- Constituency: Lisbon
- In office 5 April 2002 – 19 June 2011
- Constituency: Viana do Castelo

Secretary of State of Regional Development
- In office 2002–2004

Secretary of State of Environment
- In office 2004–2005

Personal details
- Born: José Eduardo Rego Mendes Martins; 9 December 1969 (age 56) Lisbon, Lisbon District, Portugal
- Party: Social Democratic Party (1985–)
- Education: University of Lisbon
- Occupation: Politician
- Profession: Lawyer
- Website: Abreu Advogados

José Eduardo Rego Mendes Martins (born 9 December 1969 in Lisbon) is a Portuguese lawyer and politician. He is a former member of the Assembly of the Republic and also served as Secretary of State of Regional Development and Secretary of State of Environment during the 15th and 16th Constitutional Governments of Portugal, respectively.
