= Portuguese Bar Association =

Public association

- Founded: 12 June 1926; 99 years ago
- Type: Bar association
- Region served: Portugal
- Website: https://portal.oa.pt

The Order of Attorneys of Portugal (Portuguese: Ordem dos Advogados), also known as the Portuguese Bar Association, is the public association to which all attorneys-at-law belong in Portugal, founded in 1926. Its early origins are found on a private association founded in 1838 by a group of lawyers from Lisbon.

Graduates in law from university who wish to act on behalf of clients before a court of law must register at the Portuguese Bar Association. Only those who are duly registered can provide legal consultation and appear before the court. Other graduates in law may choose other jobs, which do not demand registration at the bar association.

Being a public association, it is independent from the government, but it has some public powers, which include disciplinary action over its members. Its decisions are subject to judicial impeachment. In Portuguese law, an attorney-at-law is known as advogado. His job equals that of both solicitors and barristers (although Portugal also has a separate profession of solicitor, or solicitador).

The internship for a Portuguese recently graduated Lawyer to become full member of the Bar, includes a complex week-long exam at first, three day long pre-exams on a Monday, Wednesday and Friday, then a usually unpaid, though sometimes paid, internship of eighteen months and finally, a last exam for a whole day. However, after this exam, the intern is also subject to an oral exam which is again, mandatory.

== Presidents of the Portuguese Bar Association ==
#	Image	Name	Term	Ref.
1		Vicente Rodrigues Monteiro	1927–1929	
2		Fernando Martins de Carvalho	1930–1932	
3		José Maria Barbosa de Magalhães	1933–1935	
11		Adelino da Palma Carlos	1951–1956	
20		Júlio Castro Caldas	1993–1998	
21		António Pires de Lima	1999–2001	
22		José Miguel Júdice	2002–2004	
23		Rogério Alves	2005–2007	
24		António Marinho e Pinto	2008–2013	
25		Elina Fraga	2014–2016	
26		Guilherme Figueiredo	2017–2019	
27		Luís Menezes Leitão	2020–2022	
28		Fernanda de Almeida Pinheiro	2023–2025	
29		João Massano	2025–	
