= Timeline of anti-Zionism =

This timeline of anti-Zionism chronicles the history of anti-Zionism, including events in the history of anti-Zionist thought.

== 1800–1896 ==
- 1880s – The Jewish community of Jerusalem (which largely consisted of Orthodox Jews) regarded the emergence of Zionism as a threat, particularly for its secular western character and redefinition of Jewishness. Through this decade, the Orthodox communities fought the Zionist idea of Jews as a people in search of a homeland, rather than being, for Judaism, a community awaiting redemption from the Messiah. The established Jewish community in Jerusalem denounced Zionist newcomers to the Ottoman authorities.
- 1882 – United States minister to the Ottoman Empire, Lew Wallace, was moved by the hardships of Russian refugees he saw starving in the streets of Constantinople. He was called at the Porte's Foreign Office. He received a communication from the minister of foreign affairs in which the statement was made that Jews would be made welcome anywhere in the empire except in Palestine.
  - In reaction to Leon Pinsker's Autoemanzipation! that asserted Jewish emancipation required a homeland of their own outside Europe, Viennese rabbi Adolf Jellinek replied that 'Jews did not have any national characteristics, as such but "thanks to their universalism they adapt and absorb qualities from the nations in whose midst they are born and educated. We are at home in Europe and regard ourselves as children of the lands in which we were born and raised, whose languages we speak, and whose cultures make up our intellectual substance. We are Germans, Frenchmen, Magyars, Italians, and so forth, with every fiber of our being. We have long ceased to be true, thoroughbred Semites, and we have long ago lost sense of Hebrew nationality."
  - The Russian Imperial Orthodox Palestine Society is formed, supporting hundreds of institutions in Syria and Palestine but refusing to serve Jews and functionally acting as an extension of Tsarist Russian policy.
- 1885 – The Pittsburgh Platform, convened by Reform Judaism leaders Kaufmann Kohler and Isaac Mayer Wise, denounces Zionism, adopting the text: "We recognize, in the modern era of universal culture of heart and intellect, the approaching of the realization of Israel s great Messianic hope for the establishment of the kingdom of truth, justice, and peace among all men. We consider ourselves no longer a nation, but a religious community, and therefore expect neither a return to Palestine, nor a sacrificial worship under the sons of Aaron, nor the restoration of any of the laws concerning the Jewish state".
- 1891 – 24 June, Arab notables in Jerusalem petition the Ottoman Grand Vizier to prohibit Russian Jews from entering Palestine and purchasing land there.
- 1897 – Chief Rabbi of Vienna Moritz Güdemann publishes his pamphlet Nationaljudenthum, his detailed rebuttal to Herzl's pamphlet Der Judenstaat rejecting Zionism as antithetical to Judaism. Güdemann feared that a day might come when “Judaism with cannons and bayonets would reverse the roles of David and Goliath to constitute a ridiculous contradiction of itself.”
  - Henri Lammens, a Belgian scholar at the Jesuit University of Beirut, publishes "Zionism and the Jewish Colonies" in Études, describing the first Zionist Congress: “As at an ordinary meeting of ‘goyim,’ almost all the delegates were in evening dress and white tie; rabbinical cloaks seemed very sparse. (...) The Jews of Jerusalem were recognisable by their repulsive grubbiness and above all by that famous Semitic nose, which is not, like the Greek nose, a pure myth"
  - Jacques Cœur writing in Études des Juives, describes Jews as "always wandering, leaderless, without a homeland, and consequently without the means to resist the slightest power that would seek to destroy them, their first maxim is to have none. Quite different from all other peoples of the earth, their security depends on the degree of their servitude.
  - Hermann Adler, the Chief Rabbi of the Ashkenazi movement in London, and Moritz Güdemann, the Chief Rabbi of Viennese Jewry, criticized Herzl's proposal for a Munich conference on Palestine, and the executive board of the German Rabbinical Association, headed by Sigmund Maybaum, expressed the view in a public declaration in June 1897 affirming that: "The aspirations of so-called Zionists to found a Jewish nation state in Palestine, contradict the messianic promise of Judaism as it is written in the Holy Scripture and in later religious sources."

== After the First Zionist Congress in Basel ==
- 1897 – The Jewish Labour Bund, a secular anti-Zionist socialist party whose purpose was to unify Jews within the Russian Empire is founded in Vilnius on 7 October.
- 1898 – Karl Kraus writes Eine Krone für Zion, a polemic against (political) Zionism, accusing Herzl of supporting antisemites by promoting the idea Jews have multiple loyalties, and promoting their idea Jews should leave their countries.
- In 1899, compelled by a "holy duty of conscience," Yousef al-Khalidi, Arab mayor of Jerusalem and a member of the Ottoman Parliament, wrote a letter to Zadok Kahn, the Chief Rabbi of France to voice his concerns that Zionism would jeopardize the friendly associations between Muslims, Christians and Jews in the Ottoman Empire. He wrote: 'Who can deny the rights of the Jews to Palestine? My God, historically it is your country!" (Note: 'Qui peut contester les droits des Juifs sur la Palestine ? Mon Dieu, historiquement, c’est bien votre pays ! Et quel spectacle merveilleux ça serait si les Juifs, si doués, étaient de nouveau reconstitués en une nation indépendante, respectée, heureuse, pouvant rendre à la pauvre humanité des services dans le domaine comme autrefois! Malheureusement, les destinées des nations ne sont point gouvernées seulement par ces conceptions abstraites, si pures, si nobles qu’elles puissent être. Il faut compter avec la réalité, avec les faits acquis, avec la force brutale des circonstances. Or la réalité est que la Palestine fait maintenant partie intégrale de l’Empire Ottoman et, ce qui est plus grave, elle est habitée par d’autres que des Israélites. Cette réalité, ces faits acquis, cette force brutale des circonstances ne laissent au zionisme (sic), géographiquement aucun espoir de réalisation, et ce qui est surtout important, menacent d’un vrai danger la situation des Juifs en Turquie. Certes, les Turcs et les Arabes sont généralement bien disposés envers vos coreligionnaires. Cependant, il y a parmi eux aussi des fanatiques, eux aussi, comme toutes les autres nations même les plus civilisées, ne sont pas exempts des sentiments de haine de race. En outre, il y a en Palestine des chrétiens fanatiques, surtout parmi les orthodoxes et les catholiques qui, considérant la Palestine comme devant appartenir à eux seulement, sont très jaloux des progrès des Juifs dans le pays de leurs ancêtres et ne laissent passer aucune occasion pour exciter la haine des musulmans contre les Juifs. Il faut donc, pour la tranquillité des Juifs en Turquie, que le mouvement sioniste, dans le sens géographique du mot, cesse. Que l’on cherche un endroit quelque part pour la malheureuse nation juive, rien de plus juste et équitable. Mon Dieu, la terre est assez vaste, il y a encore des pays inhabités où l'on pourrait placer des millions d'israélites pauvres, qui y deviendront peut-être heureux et un jour constitueraient une nation. Ça serait peut-être la meilleure, la plus rationnelle solution de la question juive. Mais, au nom de Dieu, qu'on laisse tranquille la Palestine.') But Khalidi suggested that, since Palestine was already inhabited, the Zionists should find another place for the implementation of their political goals. "... in the name of God," he wrote, "let Palestine be left alone."'
- 1902 – The American Israelite calls Zionism a "pernicious agitation" that would undermine the acceptance of Jews in the countries where they currently resided. The Israelite is also used by a number of editorial contributors such as David Philipson, Moses Mielziner and Jewish history scholar Gotthard Deutsch to oppose Zionism, arguing that Judaism was a religion exclusively, and thus its people were stateless.
- 1903: Publication of the The Protocols of the Elders of Zion, an antisemitic forgery originating in the Russian empire, written in the months after a Russian Zionist congress in September 1902, purporting to document a Jewish conspiracy for world control. The forgery would prove influential on antisemitism and later anti-Zionism over the following decades.
- 1905 – Jewish Territorialist Organization splits off from the World Zionist Organization, in order to obtain "a large tract of territory (preferably within the British Empire) wherein to found a Jewish Home of Refuge" outside of Palestine. They explored the idea of settlement in Cyrenaica.Folksgrupe (a Jewish Duma faction that sought, as opposed to Russian Zionist members, communal autonomy) founded in Vilna in March.
- 1908–14 – growing Palestinian and Ottoman opposition to the Zionist project begins to take shape.
- 1912 – May. Agudat Israel forms in Katowice, attended by 200 orthodox rabbis from Germany and Eastern Europe, with Nathan Birnbaum as it chief ideologue, representing the first organized Orthodox opposition to Zionism and the foundation of a Jewish state.
- 1915 – Philosopher Hermann Cohen publishes Deutschtum und Judentum, opposed the Zionist programme arguing that Jews had no need for a homeland since they were an integral part of Europe.
- 1916, November – Claude Montefiore, opposing Zionism for threatening to create a problem of loyalty for Jews in the diaspora, argued that anti-Semites backed Zionism, commenting “How can a man belong to two nations at once?... No wonder that all anti-Semites are enthusiastic Zionists.”
- 1917 – Edwin Samuel Montagu submits his Memorandum on the Anti-Semitism of the British Government, in response to ongoing discussions around the Balfour Declaration. His view was that the British proposal was anti-Semitic, that it meant that Jews would be given preferential treatment over Muslims and Christians who also had a long history of attachment to the country and that it would rally anti-Semites the world over. Anti-Jewish prejudices could not be overcome by the creation of a Jewish state. He stated also that “Zionism has always seemed to me to be a mischievous political creed, untenable by any patriotic citizen of the United Kingdom" and outlines his four principles of anti-Zionism.”
- 1917 – David Lindo Alexander, president of the Board of Deputies of British Jews and Claude Montefiore, president of the Anglo-Jewish Association objecting to published statements of the Zionist leaders that "Jewish settlements in Palestine shall be recognized as possessing a national character " and the intention “to invest the Jewish settlers in Palestine with certain special rights in excess of those enjoyed by the rest of the population”.

== After the Balfour Declaration ==
- 1917 – In the United Kingdom, the anti-Zionist League of British Jews was established.
- 1918 – Rabbi Isaac Breuer declared: 'Zionism is the most terrible enemy that has ever arisen to the Jewish Nation. The anti-nationalistic Reform engages it (the Jewish nation) at least in an open fight, but Zionism kills the nation and then elevates the corpse to the throne.'
- 1918 – Yevsektsiya was formed in Soviet Russia to fight Zionism and bring Communism to the Jewish masses.
- 1919 – Jewish congressman Julius Kahn presents an anti-Zionist petition to Woodrow Wilson ahead of the Paris Peace Conference, including the statement: "We protest against the political segregation of the Jews and the re-establishment in Palestine of a distinctively Jewish State as utterly opposed to the principles of democracy which it is the avowed purpose of the World's Peace Conference to establish. Whether the Jews be regarded as a 'race' or as a 'religion', it is contrary to the democratic principles for which the world war was waged to found a nation on either or both of these bases." The petition included signatures from over 300 prominent American Jews, including Henry Morgenthau, Sr. and Simon W. Rosendale.
  - -The US Government sponsored King–Crane Commission advocated the creation of a Greater Syria, to include Palestine, stating "nor can the erection of such a Jewish State be accomplished without the gravest trespass upon the civil and religious rights of existing non-Jewish communities in Palestine".
  - –Reichsbund jüdischer Frontsoldaten English: "Reich League of Jewish War Veterans" was a non-Zionist organization founded in Germany in February. A 26 June 1934 directive by Reinhard Heydrich led to the rapid fall in participation in the group, which was placed under police surveillance, while the same policy, as implemented, actively encouraged their competing Zionist associations in Germany, since the latter encouraged Jewish expatriation from Germany to Palestine.
- 1924 – Jacob Israël de Haan is assassinated by the Haganah for his anti-Zionist political activities and contacts with Arab leaders.
- 1925 Brit Shalom is founded, repudiating the Balfour Agreement and renouncing the Zionist concept of a nation with a Jewish majority, calling instead for a binational state for two peoples. They viewed Zionism as a means to create in Palestine a Jewish spiritual centre.
- 1929 In October St John Philby, an anti-Zionist, draws up the Philby Plan after consultation with Arab leaders, calling for an endorsement of the Balfour Declaration, Jewish immigration, but a representation of all parties according to their numbers, while calling on Zionists to renounce any pursuit of political domination. The plan was favourably received by Judah Magnes.
- 1936 – Victor Alter of the General Jewish Labour Bund in Poland labels Ze'ev Jabotinsky antisemitic, writing: "No, it is not we who are creating a sense of alienation between the Jewish masses and Poland; this is being attempted by those who have supported Jewish reaction wherever and whenever it occurs, who wish to turn the Jewish masses into a collective of fanatics who are alien to the ideology and struggles of Polish workers"
- 1938 – Gandhi writes The Jews In Palestine, in which he states: "Palestine belongs to the Arabs in the same sense that England belongs to the English or France to the French. It is wrong and inhuman to impose the Jews on the Arabs.... The Palestine of the Biblical conception is not a geographical tract. It is in their hearts. [...] Let the Jews who claim to be the chosen race prove their title by choosing the way of non-violence for vindicating their position on earth. Every country is their home, including Palestine, not by aggression but by loving service".
- 1939 – The Jewish Dutch assimilationist Louis Fles publishes his pamphlet Weg met het zionisme! (Down with Zionism!).
  - The British White Paper in limiting Jewish immigration to Palestine for 5 years, was seen as adopting an anti-Zionist policy.

== The 1940s, the Biltmore Program and after ==
- 1941 – In the wake of the Jewish refugee problem under Nazism, and on the occasion of the Iraqi pogrom against Jews in 1–2 June, Arab members of the Palestine Communist Party remonstrated with Iraqi Communist support for Rashid Ali al-Gaylani, insisting that a clear distinction be drawn between anti-Zionism and both anti-Judaism and anti-Semitism, a distinction maintained throughout the period by the National Liberation League in Palestine, as they opposed expulsion of Jewish migrants.
- 1942 - The Biltmore Conference works out a program stating the necessity of creating a "Jewish Commonwealth" in Palestine.
- 1942 – American Council for Judaism, an organization of American Jews committed to the proposition that Jews are not a nationality but merely a religious group, adhering to the original stated principles of Reform Judaism, as articulated in the 1885 Pittsburgh Platform, was founded.
- 1943 – Ben-Gurion criticized the decision of a court in Mandatory Palestine implicating Zionists in arm-trafficking by saying that the court's attitude was influenced by anti-Semitism. Christopher Sykes interpreted this as meaning that "henceforth to be anti-Zionist was to be anti-Semitic; to disapprove of Jewish territorial nationalism was to be a Nazi".
- 1944 – Philosopher Hannah Arendt publishes Zionism Reconsidered, writing "Only folly could dictate a policy which trusts a distant imperial power for protection, while alienating the goodwill of neighbours [...] If the Jewish commonwealth is obtained in the near future [...] it will be due to the political assistance of American Jews [...] if the Jewish commonwealth is proclaimed against the will of the Arabs and without the support of the Mediterranean peoples, not only financial help but political support will be necessary for a long time to come. And that may turn out to be very troublesome indeed for Jews in this country, who after all have no power to direct the political destinies of the Near East".
- 1945 – Rabbi Elmer Berger publishes The Jewish Dilemma, which argued that Zionism was a surrender to the racial myths about the Jews and that assimilationism was still the best path for the Jews in the modern world.
- 1945 - US President Franklin D. Roosevelt met with King Ibn Saud of Saudi Arabia. Ibn Saud pointed out that it was Germany who had committed crimes against the Jews and so Germany should be punished. Palestinian Arabs had done no harm to European Jews and did not deserve to be punished by losing their land. Roosevelt on return to the US concluded that Israel "could only be established and maintained by force."
- 1945 - on December 2, an official organized boycott of the Yishuv (pre-state Jewish community in Palestine) was adopted by the Arab League
- 1946 – The Jewish Anti-Zionist League founded in Egypt.
  - Sir Isaac Isaacs publishes Palestine: Peace and Prosperity or War and Destruction? Political Zionism: Undemocratic, Unjust, Dangerous. His opposition to political Zionism brought him into conflict with his local community.
- 1948 – Committee for Justice and Peace in the Holy Land founded by Virginia Gildersleeve and Kermit Roosevelt, Jr., which was later subsumed into the American Friends of the Middle East with Dorothy Thompson, Kermit Roosevelt, Jr., and 24 further American educators, theologians, and writers (including Harry Emerson Fosdick).

== After the founding of the State of Israel ==
- 1953 – Alfred Lilienthal, considered to vie with Rabbi Berger as the 'public face of Jewish anti-Zionism in America,' publishes What Price Israel?, a work which became a sourcebook for anti-Israel polemics.
- 1961 – Rabbi Joel Teitelbaum, leader of the Satmar Hasidim, publishes Vayoel Moshe, a criticism of Zionism regarded by Rabkin as 'the fundamental work of Judaic anti-Zionism, in which he argues that the "idolatry" of the modern Zionist movement was a sin punished by God through the Holocaust.
- 1962 – Matzpen organisation founded in Israel, a socialist anti-Zionist organization.
- 1965 – Moshe Menuhin publishes “Not by Might, nor by Power”: The Zionist Betrayal of Judaism in our Time,. In the book he recalls that in his childhood in Palestine, 'it was drummed into our young hearts that the fatherland must extend to the ancient borders and that it 'must become Goyimrein (that is, free of Gentiles)'.
  - The French sociologist Georges Philippe Friedmann (1902–1977) publishes The End of the Jewish People,, in which he argues that the complete emancipation of the Jewish people signaled by both the creation of Israel and their assimilation of the West would lead to the demise of the Jewish people. Israel, he thought, challenging a basic assumption of both secular and religious Zionism, was a melting pot in which Israelization was bulldozing the differences of 102 Jewish subcultures. He altered his stance after 1967.
- 1967 – Maxime Rodinson publishes Israel, fait colonial? in Jean-Paul Sartre's journal, Les Temps Modernes. Rodinson concluded that:'the creation of the State of Israel on Palestinian soil is the culmination of a process that fits perfectly into the great European-American movement of expansion in the nineteenth and twentieth centuries whose aim was to settle new inhabitants among other peoples or to dominate them economically and politically.'

== After the Six Day War ==
- 1968 – Elmer Berger, the last active rabbi among those associated with the foundation of the American Council for Judaism, breaks with the lay leadership and founds the American Jewish Alternatives to Zionism (AJAZ).
- 1970 – Ma'avak party founded, a Maoist–influenced anti-Zionist organization.
- 1972 – Arie Bober (ed.) The Other Israel: the Radical Case against Zionism Doubleday & Co, is published. The work consists entirely of a compilation of Matzpen writings, and Part 3 consists of a 5-chapter critique of Zionist ideology.
- 1973 – Trial of the Revolutionary Communist alliance – Red Front members including Daud Turki, Udi Adiv and Dan Vered. The trial is described by Uri Davis as constituting a milestone in the history of the anti-Zionist movement within Israel.
- 1975 – United Nations General Assembly Resolution 3379 passed, which "determine[d] that Zionism is a form of racism and racial discrimination".
- 1979 – Edward Said The Question of Palestine published, arguing that Zionism was an idea that grew out of European imperialism, and which, once imported into Palestine, caused the Palestinians to suffer in consequence.
- 1980 – Naeim Giladi, an Iraqi Zionist who later renounced his Israeli citizenship and militated as an anti-Zionist, writes Ben Gurion's Scandals: How the Haganah and the Mossad Eliminated Jews.
- 1983 – Noam Chomsky, interpreted by many American Jews to be an anti-Zionist, writes The Fateful Triangle which in later editions analysed what Chomsky regarded as 'the pro-Zionist bias of most American media and intellectuals'.
  - USSR founds the Anti-Zionist Committee of the Soviet Public, headed by David Dragunsky.
- 1984 – Uri Davis (academic and civil rights activist), defining himself as not Jewish but rather "a Palestinian Hebrew national of Jewish origin, anti-Zionist," joins Fatah.
  - Alternative Information Center founded in Palestine, a joint socialist anti-Zionist Palestinian–Israeli non-governmental organization which was founded by an anti-Zionist, Michel Warschawski (Mikado) and "engages in dissemination of information, political advocacy, grassroots activism and critical analysis of the Palestinian and Israeli societies as well as the Palestinian-Israeli conflict".
- 1987 – Publication of the Return statement of Jews "Against the Israeli Law of Return – For the Palestinian Right to Return".
- 1988 - publication of first Hamas charter
  - Ella Shohat's Sephardim in Israel: Zionism from the Standpoint of Its Jewish Victims published.
- 1989 – The theologian and anti-Zionist Marc H. Ellis, who believes that a Jewish state and the power it wields is incompatible with the ethics of Judaism, writes The Future of Dissent: a Reflection on What Shall I Do With This People? Jews and the Fractious Politics of Judaism.
- 1990 – Thomas Kolsky's Jews Against Zionism published.

== 1994–present ==
- 1994 – Israel Shahak, whose work often equates Zionism with Nazi racism, Israel divided between Jews and non-Jews, writes Jewish History, Jewish Religion: the Weight of Three Thousand Years, in which he argues that Zionism has been an instrument in reimposing on Jews what he considered a totalitarian Jewish community model developed in classical Judaism.
- 2000 – Norman Finkelstein's The Holocaust Industry published.
- 2001 – Israel and the United States pull out of the World Conference against Racism 2001, in protest at a draft declaration that described Zionism as racism by referring to "racist practices of Zionism and anti-Semitism".
- 2003 Hajo Meyer Het einde van het Jodendom published in Amsterdam. Meyer, a survivor of Auschwitz, theorized that the Holocaust, adding to the memory of continual historical trauma, rather than serving to avoid dangers, only re-energized a sense of trauma and paranoia that could be manipulated by psychopathic leaders bent on destructive policies. He applied this to the Israeli-Palestinian conflict, using analogies with how the Nazis dehumanized the Jews in the period leading up to, but not including, the Holocaust.
- 2004 – Yakov M. Rabkin, professor of history at Montreal University, publishes Au nom de la Torah: une histoire de l’opposition juive au sionisme, which was issued in an English version in 2006. Rabkin, according to Joseph Agassi, challenges as a myth the idea, equated with Zionism, that Israel constitutes the natural homeland of Jews by surveying the history of Jewish opposition to Zionism. The work was hailed by Rabbi Baruch Horowitz as an important survey of rabbinical authorities who regarded the foundation of a Jewish state as a threat to the survival of the Jewish people and as a factor in the exacerbation of antisemitic trends.
- 2005 – Michael Neumann, described as an anti-Zionist polemicist, writes The Case Against Israel.
  - The Boycott, Divestment and Sanctions campaign, regarded as a 'so-called anti-Zionist' movement, is initiated, which calls for "various forms of boycott against Israel until it meets its obligations under international law".
- 2006 – Ilan Pappé, described by Avi Shlaim as 'the cutting edge of radical anti-Zionism', authors The Ethnic Cleansing of Palestine.
- 2007 – Joel Kovel's critique of Zionism, Overcoming Zionism: Creating a Single Democratic State in Israel/Palestine is published by Pluto Press.
- 2008 – Shlomo Sand, called 'the scourge of anti-Zionist secular Jews' by one commentator, authors his controversial The Invention of the Jewish People, a polemic both against secular Zionism and anti-Zionism, which argues against the idea of Jewish nationalism and of the existence of a Jewish nation, and criticises the use of Jewish values to defend the state of Israel.
  - Mike Marqusee's memoir If I Am Not For Myself: Journey of an Anti-Zionist Jew published.
- 2010 – Former BBC and ITN journalist Alan Hart, considered an anti-Israeli polemicist, authors Zionism: The Real Enemy of the Jews, in which he argues that,'There is nothing anybody in publishing, the media in general and politics fears more than being accused of anti-Semitism. Since the obscenity of the Nazi Holocaust, the false charge of anti-Semitism is the blackmail card Zionism has played brilliantly to prevent informed and honest debate about who must do what if there is to be a peaceful resolution of the Palestine problem, which is the prerequisite for averting a clash of civilizations, Judeo-Christians v.Islamic'.
- 2011 – Gilad Atzmon's The Wandering Who?:A Study of Jewish Identity Politics published, a work that is contemptuous of anti-Zionists. In it he argues that Zionism is, for native secular Israelis, essentially an archaic or foreign concept, and that much anti-Zionist discourse has no effect on them since Zionism itself is 'largely a Jewish diaspora discourse'. Atzmon's book was widely condemned by mainstream anti-Zionists as antisemitic.
- 2012 Judith Butler's Jewishness and the Critique of Zionism published by Columbia University Press, proposing 3 theses: that Zionism is unacceptable because it aims to dispossess the Palestinians; that it is to be repudiated for its attitude to Jews, whose identity it seeks to appropriate; and thirdly, that it is incompatible with Judaism.
- 2013 – Gianni Vattimo and Michael Marder's critical collection of essays Deconstructing Zionism: A Critique of Political Metaphysics published by Bloomsbury Academic.
- 2017 – Chicago Dyke March asked a group of women marching with Jewish pride flags to leave the event for flaunting a "zionist expression". Their expulsion gave rise to widespread accusations of antisemitism. The chairpersons of Chicago SlutWalk supported the expulsion, stating that the Star of David emblem used was not neutral, but rather a Zionist symbol, symbolizing Israeli oppression.
  - October 2017 – A leaflet with text by Israeli-born mathematician and anti-Zionist Moshe Machover arguing that "Anti-Zionism does not equal anti-Semitism" was distributed at the British Labour Party annual conference. He was investigated by the party for antisemitism, due to some passages in the leaflet on the Zionist relationship to the Nazis, and briefly expelled for his association with rival political parties.
  - 6 November – Simon Schama wrote a letter to The Times, undersigned also by Simon Sebag-Montefiore and Howard Jacobson, claiming that in the Labour Party, criticism of Israel, hiding behind the mask of 'so-called anti-Zionism', has undergone a seachange, morphing into something akin to anti-Semitism.
- February 2020 - A former Zionist, Sylvain Cypel, authors L'Etat d'Israël contre les Juifs, La Découverte, ISBN 978-2-348-04344-4, a critique of Zionism arguing that Israel is a 'thug nation' engaged in apartheid. (English version:Sylvain Cypel,The State of Israel vs. the Jews, tr. William Rodarmor, Other Press 2021 ISBN 978-1-635-42098-2)
- March 2022 - Rabbi Brant Rosen's Congregation Tzedek Chicago adds anti-Zionism to its core values statement.

== See also ==
- Timeline of Zionism

== Sources ==
- Perrin, Dominique (2020) [First published 2000]. Palestine: Une terre, deux peuples. Presses Universitaires du Septentrion. ISBN 978-2-757-42198-7.
- Mandel, Neville J. (1976). The Arabs and Zionism before World War I (PDF). Berkeley: University of California Press. ISBN 0-520-02466-4.
