= Hanegbi =

Hanegbi (Hebrew: הנגבי is a Hebrew surname. Notable people with the surname include:

- Haim Hanegbi (1935–2018), Palestinian Jewish leftist political activist
- Tzachi Hanegbi (born 1957), Israeli politician and national security expert
