= Ma'avak =

Political organisation in Israel

Revolutionary Communist Alliance הברית הקומוניסטית המהפכנית
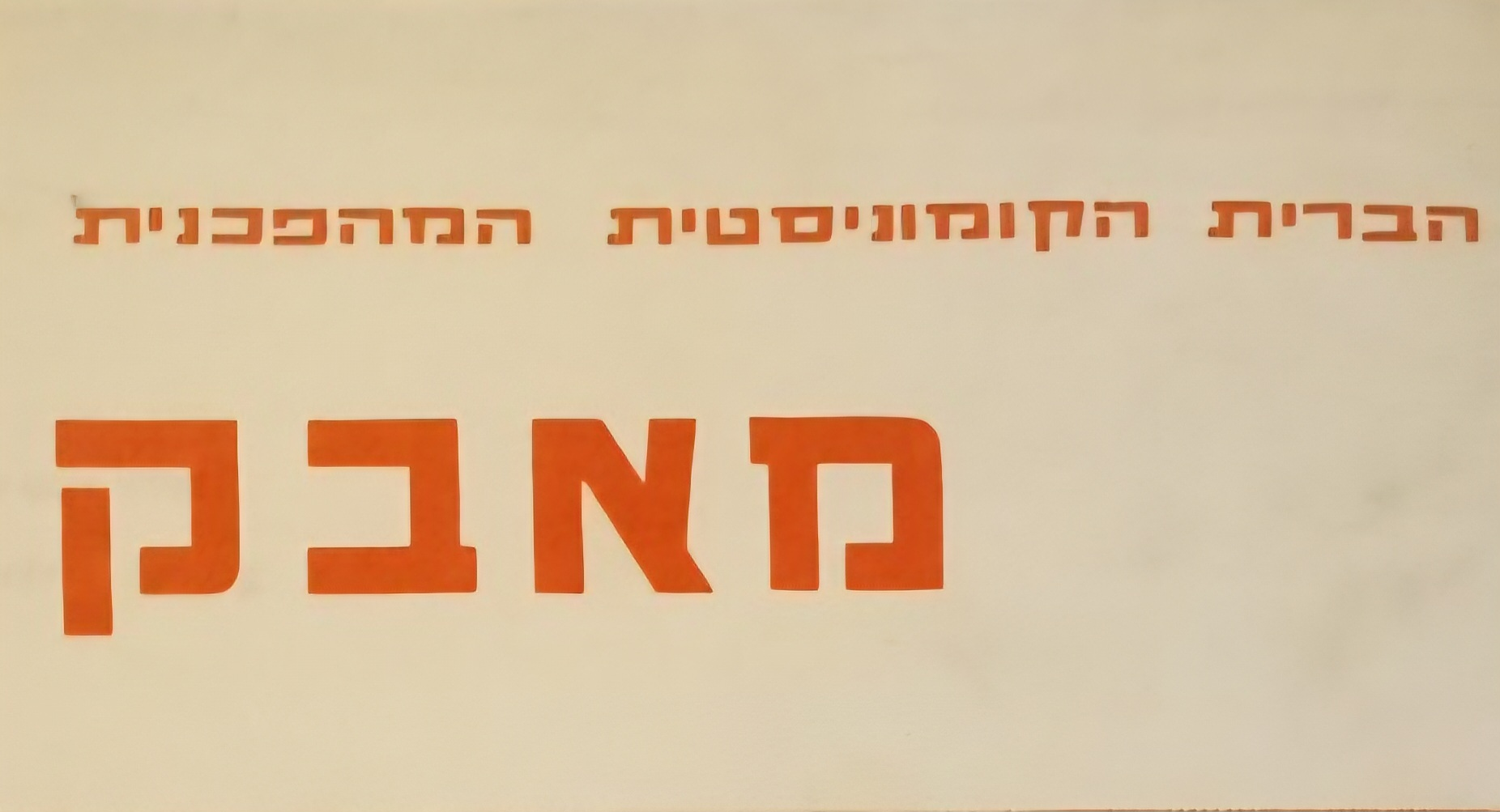
- Founded: 1970
- Split from: Matzpen
- Newspaper: Ma'avak (מאבק)
- Ideology: Communism; Maoism
- Political position: Far-left

Ma'avak (Hebrew: מאבק, lit. 'Struggle') was a Maoist-influenced political organisation in Israel in the early 1970s. Officially known as the Revolutionary Communist Alliance (Hebrew: הברית הקומוניסטית המהפכנית, romanized: HaBrit HaKomunistit HaMahapakhnit), the group became better known by the name of its journal, Ma'avak. It split from Matzpen in the autumn of 1970. Citing organisational, strategic and programmatic disagreements, Ma'avak stressed the colonial nature of the Israeli state. In its founding statement, Ma'avak stated "Our principles are based on Marxism-Leninism and proletarian internationalism". They stressed the October Revolution as "the starting point of the worldwide socialist revolution", and the Chinese Communist Revolution as its direct continuation, and identified with "the people of Vietnam, Korea and Palestine, and all those people whose heroic struggle against imperialism will not only lead them to a revolutionary path and participation in the international class war, but is also a direct source of experience and lessons for revolutionaries everywhere".

Members of the group included Udi Adiv, Ilan Halevi and Rami Livneh.

Ma'avak quickly underwent a further split, as described below. Some former members went on to participate in the Da'am Workers Party.

== The Red Front trial ==
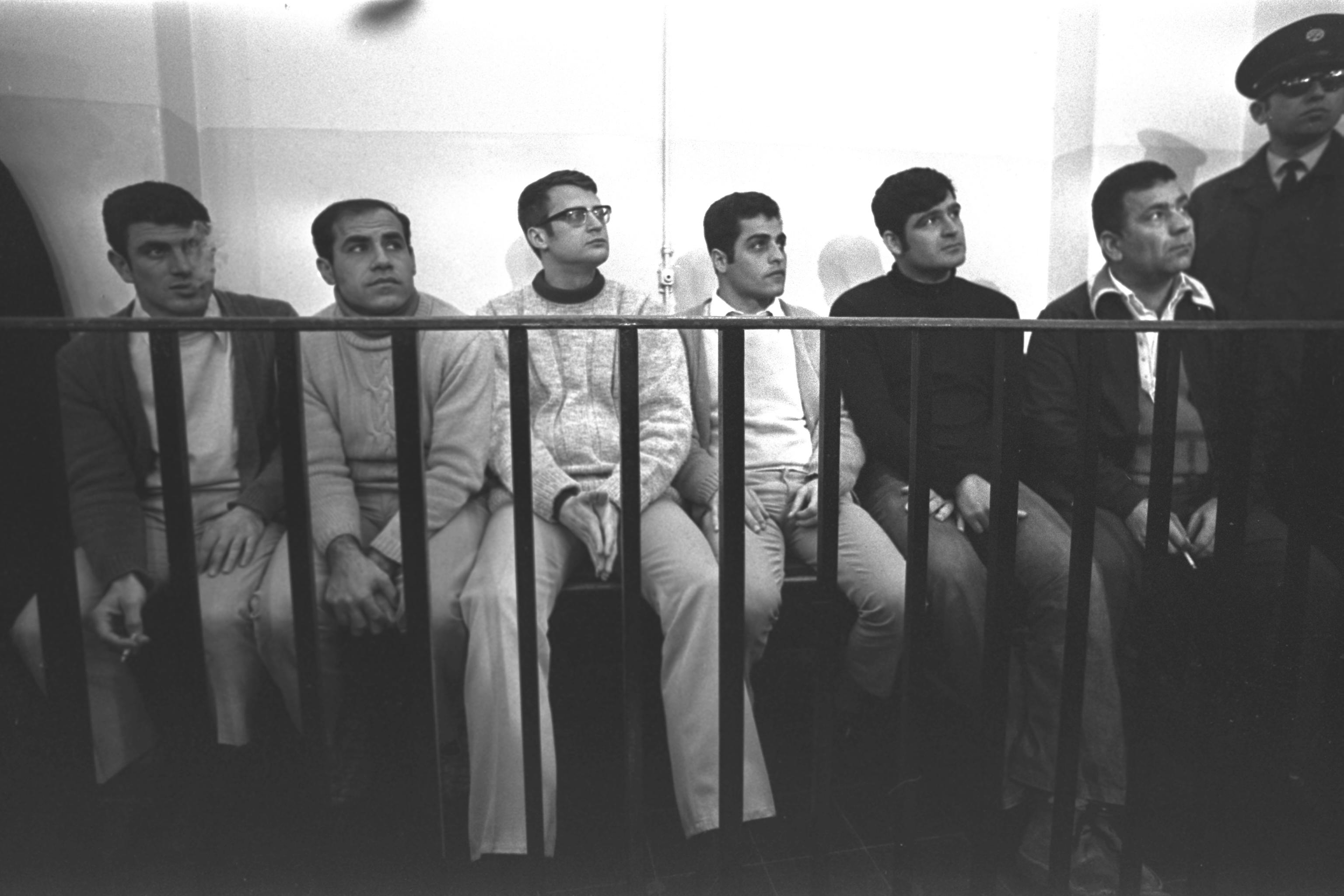
Defendants in the Red Front trial

Ma'avak split within a year, with Udi Adiv and others leaving to publish a new journal titled Hazit Adumah or Red Front. At the end of 1972 Adiv and other members of this group were arrested and charged with espionage and collaboration with the enemy (Syrian military intelligence), based on a secret trip some of them took to Damascus. In a well-publicised trial in 1973 five members of the Red Front were sentenced to various periods in prison. Many of the defendants stated that they had been subjected to torture and other forms of physical and mental harassment by the Israeli security services before the trial, to force confessions out of them. Their goal was to establish links with other revolutionary organizations in the region, primarily Palestinian ones, not with the Syrian government. Statements before the trial, submitted by the leading defendants – Adiv and Daud Turki - give a clear idea of their perspective.

Turki, a Palestinian citizen of Israel, defined their goal as socialism: "the common goal of all workers, peasants and those who are persecuted in Israeli society. The Jews have a share, and they must have a share, because they are members of the organization on a footing of equality with me, in establishing a new government and a new regime which will allow both the Jewish people and the Arab people to play an effective part in the struggle of the Arab people for liberation". Turki went on to criticise Zionism, which "instead of adopting, as it should, a neutral attitude, or one of support for the Arab struggle for national and socialist liberation, it has stood beside this movement's enemies, beside the Americans who are persecuting the Vietnamese people, beside American imperialism which is exploiting the peoples of Latin America and the peoples of Asia and Africa, and setting the Jewish people against the Arab people forever. I think that this attitude amounts to a crime against both the Jewish people and the Arab people." In his view, Jews should support the Arab struggle for liberation rather than a struggle that supersedes nationalism, although both groups have "the same future and would live together in a single homeland under the rule of a single state, a state liberated from all foreign influence and all social exploitation."

Adiv presented a similar argument. Accepting that "all trends of Matzpen" had "a sound theory", he argued that they lacked "the chapter entitled 'what is to be done' to reach the multi-national socialist Middle East they talk of, and in their political activity they restrict their talk to the Jewish state of Israel. That is to say they are preoccupied with convincing the Jews, and completely disregard the Arab struggle, and in particular the Palestinian Arab struggle against Zionism and the state of Israel." A change of focus was needed to convert the national conflict into a class struggle. This could be done only "if the Jews will prove to the Arabs, who have been fighting Zionism for dozens of years, that they [the Jews] are on their side, that they are prepared to sacrifice everything they have, to be subjected to the same 'treatment' and to share everything with them. Without this no Arab will have confidence that the sincerest Jewish revolutionary is really revolutionary. No ideology, not even the most equitable and progressive, can convince the Arabs unless it is accompanied by action on the part of those who adhere to it."
