= Revolutionary Communist League (Mandatory Palestine) =

Defunct Trotskyist political organisation in Mandatory Palestine

Revolutionary Communist League הליגה הקומוניסטית המהפכנית
- Founded: late 1930s
- Dissolved: late 1940s
- Ideology: Communism; Marxism; Trotskyism
- Political position: Far-left
- International affiliation: Fourth International

The Revolutionary Communist League (RCL) or HaLiga Kommunistit HaMahapchanit (also described as the Brit Kommunistim Mahapchanin) was a Trotskyist organisation in Mandatory Palestine in the late 1930s and 1940s, described in contemporary and later accounts as the Palestinian section of the Fourth International.

The organisation is described as having been built out of three main components: (1) exiled German Jewish former members of Heinrich Brandler’s KPO (Communist Party Opposition) who moved toward Trotskyist politics after emigrating to Palestine; (2) youth from the Chugim Marxistiim (Marxist Circles), linked to a wing of Poale Zion; and (3) elements from the left-Zionist kibbutz movement Hashomer Hatzair. Later accounts state that in the 1940s the group was joined by Jabra Nicola, an Arab communist activist who broke with Stalinism after the Molotov-Ribbentrop pact.

The RCL is described as having periodically published a hectographed newspaper, Kol Hama’amad (Voice of the Class), and as having issued leaflets in both Arabic and Hebrew connected to labour disputes and political events during the final years of the Mandate.

Tony Cliff (born Yigael Gluckstein) is described in later accounts as a member of the organisation before leaving for Britain, where he joined the Revolutionary Communist Party and later became associated with the International Socialists.

== History ==
=== Formation and composition ===
A retrospective published by the Internationalist describes a Trotskyist nucleus emerging in the late 1930s, drawing together the three currents (former KPO members, Marxist Circles youth, and Hashomer Hatzair elements) into what it calls the Brit Kommunistim Mahapchanim (RCL). The Marxist Circles component (Mifleget Poale Zion VeHaHugim HaMarksistim beEretz Yisrael, lit. The Party of the Workers of Zion and the Marxist Circles of the Land of Israel) operated as the youth group of a faction of Poale Zion in the 1930s before merging into the League. It was linked to the Independent Labour Party in Britain and affiliated with the London Bureau of socialist parties. Tony Cliff, later the leader of the International Socialists, originally entered the movement as a youthful member of this group.

Greenstein likewise describes the group as a small Fourth International current operating in Palestine, and reports an estimate of roughly thirty members (mostly Jewish) for the dissident Trotskyist group with which Jabra Nicola became affiliated in the early 1940s.

=== Activity and repression ===
Accounts of the organisation describe it as intervening mainly through agitation and leaflets, including in workplaces where Arab and Jewish workers were employed together (such as railways and oil-related industries). The same retrospective states that publication of Kol Hama’amad was at times interrupted due to arrests of key members by British authorities.

In a May 1946 article attributed to Tony Cliff and published in the British Trotskyist press, the author described an April 1946 strike wave involving government employees, postal and railway workers, and port workers, and stated that the Revolutionary Communist League issued a leaflet supporting the strike and emphasizing Arab–Jewish worker unity. (The strike figures and characterisation in that article reflect the author’s contemporary political account.)

=== Positions on the Palestine question ===
The organisation’s positions are documented in texts attributed to the RCL and republished in later archives.

- Opposition to partition (1947): In a September 1947 statement first published in Kol Hama'amad, the RCL argued that the proposed UN partition would deepen national conflict and undermine working-class struggle, and it rejected the creation of a Jewish state as an outcome it associated with dependence on imperial powers.
- War and “Against the Stream” (1948): A May 1948 editorial translated from Kol Hama'amad and published in Fourth International framed the 1947–48 violence as destructive to Arab–Jewish labour cooperation and called on workers in both communities to oppose chauvinist mobilisation and to organise against imperialism and local elites.

A 2001 retrospective summarised these positions as including opposition to partition and advocacy of an internationalist socialist solution in the region, while noting the organisation’s small size and limited influence.

=== Dissolution ===
Greenstein states that the Trotskyist current in Palestine “ceased to exist as a group” under post-1948 conditions, though individual activists continued political activity in other frameworks. The Internationalist retrospective similarly refers to the collapse of the group in the late 1940s.

== Publications ==
The organisation’s main publication is described as the Hebrew-language newspaper Kol Hama’amad (Voice of the Class). Texts attributed to the RCL and republished in later archives include:

- "Palestine Strike: Arabs and Jews Unite". Marxists Internet Archive. May 1946.
- "On the Irresponsible Handling of the Palestine Question". Marxists Internet Archive. December 1946.
- "Against Partition!". REDS – Die Roten (marxists.de). September 1947.
- "The Trotskyist Position in Palestine: Against the Stream". Marxists Internet Archive. May 1948.

== Notable members ==
- Tony Cliff (Yigael Gluckstein) – described as part of the Trotskyist current in Palestine and later active in Britain.
- Jabra Nicola – described as joining the Trotskyist group in the early 1940s after breaking with Stalinism, and later active in other left organisations and publications.
