= Matzpen =

Revolutionary socialist and anti-Zionist organisation in Israel

Matzpen מצפן Socialist Organisation in Israel
- Founded: 1962
- Dissolved: 1980s
- Split from: Maki
- Newspaper: Matzpen, Israca
- Ideology: Revolutionary socialism Anti-Zionism
- Political position: Far-left

Matzpen (Hebrew: מצפן, lit. 'Compass'), founded in 1962, was an Israeli revolutionary socialist and anti-Zionist organisation. It was active until the 1980s. Its official name was the Socialist Organisation in Israel, but it became better known as Matzpen after its monthly publication.

== Origins ==
The organisation was founded by former members of the Israeli Communist Party – Maki – who opposed that party's unquestioned support for the international policies of the Soviet Union. They offered a more radical analysis of and opposition to Zionism. An early analysis of the Arab–Israeli conflict, written before they left the Communist Party, by Moshe Machover and Akiva Orr (using a pseudonym, N. Israeli), appeared in Hebrew in 1961 under the title of Shalom, Shalom ve'ein Shalom (שלום, שלום, ואין שלום; Peace, Peace When There is No Peace – an English translation was completed in 2009; although still unpublished as of August 2016, the translation is available online). Matzpen drew together Jewish and Arab activists with various backgrounds in left-wing organisations and affiliations. Prominent among them was Jabra Nicola, a Palestinian-Israeli intellectual and activist who helped shape the theoretical orientation of the nascent organisation. It published a magazine of the same name in Hebrew and Arabic. The organisation grew in the period after the 1967 Six-Day War and Israel's occupation of Palestinian and Arab territories.

== Core positions ==
In a statement titled "Down with the Occupation", from 1 January 1969, Matzpen distinguished itself – together with the Communist Party (Rakah) – as the only forces conducting "a consistent struggle against the continued occupation of the territories conquered in June '67". Faced with a situation in which "Israel controls the whole of the Palestine Mandate territory as well as vast tracts of Egyptian territory and a region in the south of Syria", Matzpen asserted in "General Declaration by the ISO" in March 1968, that "It is both the right and duty of every conquered and subjugated people to resist and to struggle for its freedom. The ways, means and methods necessary and appropriate for such struggle must be determined by the people itself and it would be hypocritical for strangers - especially if they belong to the oppressing nation – to preach to it, saying, 'Thus shalt thou do, and thus shalt thou not do.'" It added, that despite its recognition of "the unconditional right of the conquered to resist occupation", as an organization it could support politically "only such organizations which, in addition to resisting occupation, also recognize the right of the Israeli people for self-determination" in order to enable "a joint struggle of Arabs and Jews in the region for a common future."

In this context, Matzpen's aim was to create a broad front of people opposed to the occupation and in favour of a de-Zionized Israel, which would form part of a socialist federation of the entire Middle East. In contrast to the Communist Party and the Zionist Left, Matzpen insisted that the 1967 occupation was but one stage in the long history of Zionist settlement, and reversing it would be a necessary but not sufficient condition for overall solution to the problems of the Middle East. For such a solution, political mobilization of Arabs, Jews, and other national minorities in the region would be needed. The political framework for this mobilization became known as the Arab Revolution, which combined national and socialist tasks in the process of struggle against Zionism, imperialism and Arab reaction. To advance these aims, Matzpen established links with New Left organisations in Europe and other parts of the world, and also with progressive Palestinian organisations, such as the Democratic Front for the Liberation of Palestine.

Many of the original analyses and statements of the organisation were included in a published collection under the title The Other Israel: The Radical Case Against Zionism, edited by Arie Bober (Doubleday, 1972).

Bober's book provided an overview of the positions held by Matzpen at the time on a range of issues, and thus is an essential resource on the organisation's analysis of Israeli society and the Israeli-Palestinian conflict. In the introduction to the book he offers this summation of the group's outlook:

"This book is the result of five years' collective effort by a small group of Arab and Jewish citizens of Israel to penetrate the dense net of illusion and myth that today dominates the thinking and feeling of most Israelis and, at the same time, largely determines the prevailing image of Israel in the Western world. According to the Zionist fairy tale, the state of Israel is an outpost of democracy, social justice and enlightenment, and a homeland and haven for the persecuted Jews of the world. This outpost, so the story goes, though earnestly seeking peace with its neighbors finds itself in a state of perpetual siege because of the greed of Arab rulers, the inherent "unreasonableness" of the Oriental mind and the innate Gentile proclivity toward hatred of the Jews.

"The reality, this book demonstrates, is utterly different. The Zionist state was born in the violent expropriation and expulsion from their country of the Palestinian Arabs, and that process continues today. In open alliance with Western, especially United States, imperialism, and in scarcely hidden collusion with the most reactionary forces in the Arab world, the Zionist state actively sets itself against every step, no matter how faltering, taken by the Arab masses to alleviate the centuries' old misery imposed on them by colonialism and imperialism. Within the territories occupied since 1967, the Zionist state employs a system of direct military repression to expel Palestinian Arabs from their lands and secure Jewish colonization of them, and to crush every expression of Palestinian resistance. Within its own borders, the Zionist state engages in systematic national oppression of its minority of Arab citizens. The dark-skinned majority of the privileged Jewish community itself increasingly feels the sting of racist discrimination, as economic inequality increases and social conditions deteriorate. Far from offering a haven to the persecuted Jews of the world, the Zionist state is leading new immigrants and old settlers alike toward a new holocaust by mobilizing them in a colonial enterprise and a counterrevolutionary army against the struggle of the Arab masses for national liberation and social emancipation – a struggle that is not only just but will eventually be victorious. This state of affairs is, moreover, in no sense accidental. It was the inevitable outcome of the success of the Zionist project to establish a Jewish state in Palestine. And to change this reality requires not merely a change of government or a modification of one or another specific policy, but a revolutionary transformation of the very foundations of Israeli society."

== Matzpen outside Israel ==
Israca was Matzpen's magazine abroad.

In the late 1960s and early 1970s, supporters of Matzpen abroad published Israca (Israeli Revolutionary Action Committee Abroad). The magazine included many articles published in Matzpen. Some of Matzpen was censored and that material was republished in Israca. Moshé Machover, Eli Lobel, Haim Hanegbi, and Akiva Orr were all part of the editorial board. In the late 1970s and early 1980s, supporters of the organisation and other radical left academics and activists formed another journal in the UK, Khamsin, in which they published their analyses of current events. A selection of material from Khamsin was published under the title Forbidden Agenda: Intolerance and Defiance in the Middle East (Saqi Books, 2000).

== Splits and debates ==
In 1970 the organisation started going through a process of ideological and organisational fragmentation, with some members leaving to form new groups, such as Avangard with a Trotskyist orientation, led by Menahem Carmi and Sylvain Cypel, and Ma'avak (Revolutionary Communist Alliance), with a Maoist orientation, led by Ilan Albert and Rami Livneh. A further split within the latter organisation saw the formation of the Revolutionary Communist Alliance - Red Front led by Udi Adiv and Dan Vered. Avangard also underwent splits, which saw the formation of the Spartacist League in 1974 and the Nitzotz group in 1977.

The theoretical debates that led to the splits in Matzpen had to do with the conceptualization of the relations between class struggle and nationalism in the struggle for socialism. Avangard regarded Israel as a normal capitalist society in which the working class was the primary revolutionary agent. Hence, it saw its goal as the mobilization of that class to create an Israeli socialist republic. It regarded Matzpen's focus on the Israeli-Palestinian national conflict and on the colonial origins of Israeli society as a distraction from the class struggle. Ma'avak, in contrast, saw Matzpen as not emphasizing enough the colonial character of Israeli society. It saw its goal as that of facilitating the Palestinian national liberation struggle as a necessary step towards socialism. In response to both groups, Matzpen re-asserted its combination of support for national and social struggles.

A major split within the core group of mainstream Matzpen took place in 1972, and both factions kept the name Matzpen for their respective journals, an issue that gave rise to sharp dispute between them. The obvious value of the 'Matzpen' label as a marker of radical left-wing politics was behind that decision. Most of the original leadership remained in what became known as Matzpen Tel Aviv, while the other faction became known as Matzpen Jerusalem. That latter group adopted the name Matzpen Marxist, to distinguish itself from its rivals. In 1975 it changed its name to Revolutionary Communist League, section of the Fourth International, while retaining the title Matzpen Marxist for its regular publication. The Tel Aviv group also changed its name subsequently (in 1978) to the Socialist Organization in Israel and dropped the adjective 'Israeli' in order to avoid possible association with Zionism. Both groups retained the original Matzpen dual focus on class and national liberation. Machover, Orr and Haim Hanegbi remained with the Tel Aviv based group, while the Jerusalem-based group was led by Arieh Bober and Michel Warschawski (Mikado). A youth movement known as Hafarperet (mole) was affiliated with the latter group, and was active in the mid-1970s, mostly in Haifa.

== The Red Front trial ==
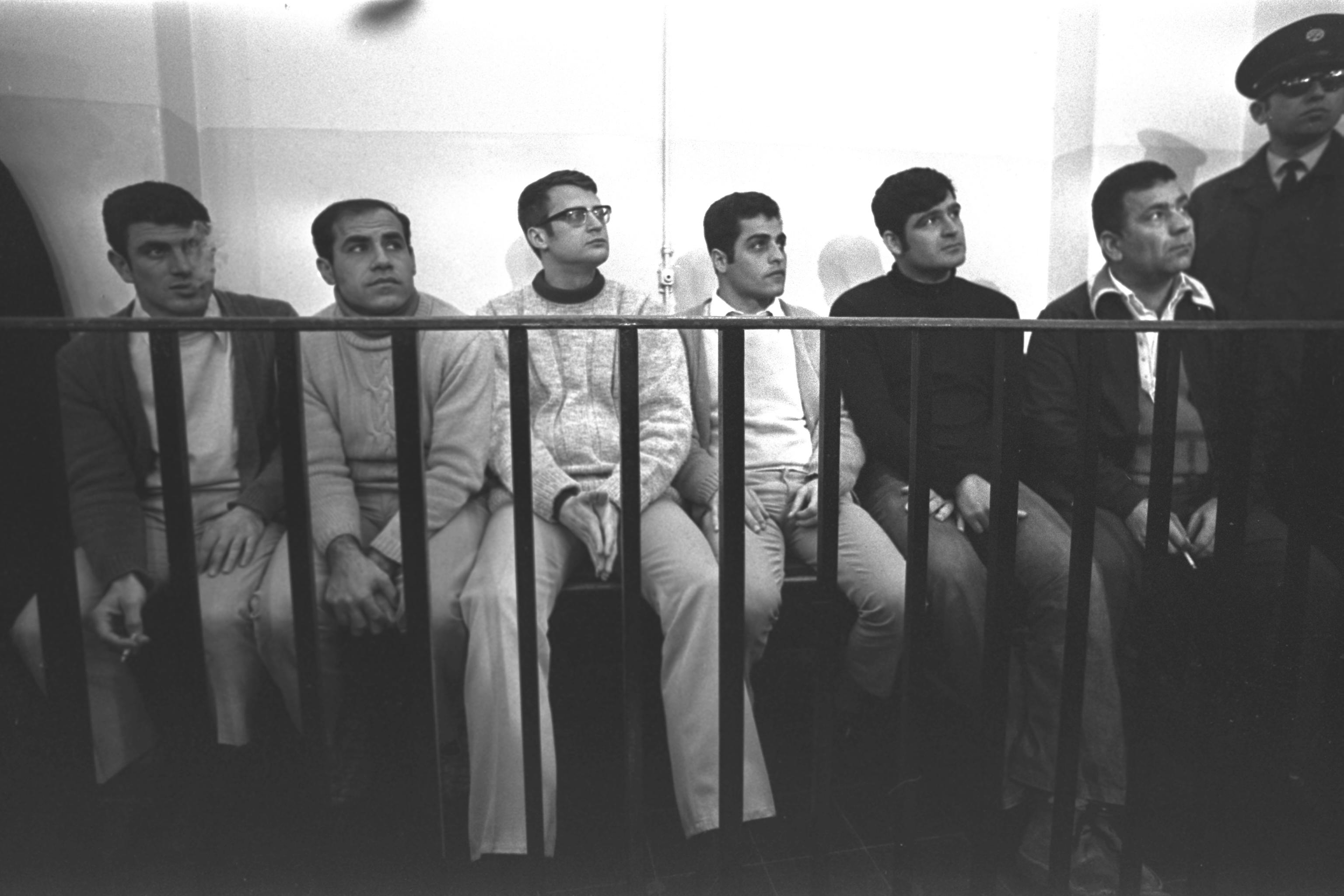
Defendants in the Red Front trial

One of the organizations to emerge from Matzpen, the Red Front (the result of a split from Ma'avak), had a brief history of just over a year. At the end of 1972 many of its members were arrested and charged with espionage and collaboration with the enemy (Syrian military intelligence), based on a secret trip some of them took to Damascus. None of the activists detained and charged were members of Matzpen at the time, or at the time they committed their alleged offences against state security. In a well-publicised trial in 1973 five members of the Red Front were sentenced to various periods in prison. Many of the defendants stated that they had been subjected to torture and other forms of physical and mental harassment by the Israeli security services before the trial, to force confessions out of them. Their goal was to establish links with other revolutionary organizations in the region, primarily Palestinian ones, not with the Syrian government. Statements before the trial, submitted by the leading defendants – Daud Turki and Ehud Adiv—give a clear idea of their perspective.

Turki, a Palestinian citizen of Israel, defined their goal as socialism: "the common goal of all workers, peasants and those who are persecuted in Israeli society. The Jews have a share, and they must have a share, because they are members of the organization on a footing of equality with me, in establishing a new government and a new regime which will allow both the Jewish people and the Arab people to play an effective part in the struggle of the Arab people for liberation". Turki went on to criticise Zionism, which "instead of adopting, as it should, a neutral attitude, or one of support for the Arab struggle for national and socialist liberation, it has stood beside this movement's enemies, beside the Americans who are persecuting the Vietnamese people, beside American imperialism which is exploiting the peoples of Latin America and the peoples of Asia and Africa, and setting the Jewish people against the Arab people forever. I think that this attitude amounts to a crime against both the Jewish people and the Arab people." In his view, Jews should support the Arab struggle for liberation rather than a struggle that supersedes nationalism, although both groups have "the same future and would live together in a single homeland under the rule of a single state, a state liberated from all foreign influence and all social exploitation."

Adiv presented a similar argument. Accepting that "all trends of Matzpen" had "a sound theory", he argued that they lacked "the chapter entitled 'what is to be done' to reach the multi-national socialist Middle East they talk of, and in their political activity they restrict their talk to the Jewish state of Israel. That is to say they are preoccupied with convincing the Jews, and completely disregard the Arab struggle, and in particular the Palestinian Arab struggle against Zionism and the state of Israel." A change of focus was needed to convert the national conflict into a class struggle. This could be done only "if the Jews will prove to the Arabs, who have been fighting Zionism for dozens of years, that they [the Jews] are on their side, that they are prepared to sacrifice everything they have, to be subjected to the same 'treatment' and to share everything with them. Without this no Arab will have confidence that the sincerest Jewish revolutionary is really revolutionary. No ideology, not even the most equitable and progressive, can convince the Arabs unless it is accompanied by action on the part of those who adhere to it."

== Beyond organizational existence – Matzpen's legacy ==
With the rise of new, vibrant and less ideologically rigid protest movements in the 1980s, in opposition to the continued occupation and to the war in Lebanon (Committee for Solidarity with Birzeit University, committees against torture and house demolitions, Yesh Gvul, Alternative Information Center, Workers Advice Center, and so on), the different factions of Matzpen lost much of their raison d'etre. The space for overall left-wing organizations, with comprehensive political agendas, shrank with the growing focus on the occupation and its consequences. Many activists sought new organizational forms in order to enhance their ability to make an effective contribution to the political struggle, without carrying cumbersome ideological and organizational baggage. Much of the energy of the Revolutionary Communist League, for example, went into creating and maintaining the Alternative Information Center, which effectively depleted the League of its own organizational capacity. As a result, most of the Matzpen factions ceased to have a distinct organizational existence by the late 1980s, if not before that. Many of their former members though, continue to participate as dedicated individuals in various activities against the occupation and for workers and human rights.

In 1995 former members of Derekh HaNitzotz established the Da'am Workers Party, which remains active to this day.

A documentary about the group, entitled "Matzpen", was made by Eran Torbiner in 2003. Another documentary about Avangard was produced in 2009 by Tom Carmi (son of two former leaders of the group) and presented at the Tel Aviv Docaviv festival. It is titled "Away from the Tribe's Centre", and was awarded second prize in the students' films competition. In these documentaries as well as most other books by and interviews with members who ended up in different factions, the doctrinal differences that led to their divergent paths disappear from view. The focus almost invariably is on activities against the occupation, anti-Zionist positions, the sense of dissent, and so on, which they all shared, rather than on what had set them apart.

Despite the absence of organizational activity, some of the original Matzpen members continue to write and be active politically. Haim Hanegbi and Michel Warschawski played a key role in writing the 2004 Olga Document, which is a statement of the anti-Zionist position and a radical critique of Israeli policies and practices, and Warschawski published his political memoir in English, On the Border (South End Press, 2004; original French in 2002). He further published, together with Lebanese academic and activist Gilbert Achcar, a book titled The 33-Day War: Israel's War on Hezbollah in Lebanon and Its Consequences (Paradigm Publishers, 2007), in which the war is covered with a focus on both Israeli and Lebanese perspectives. Sylvain Cypel wrote a historical and political analysis of Israeli society under the title Walled: Israeli Society at an Impasse (Other Press, 2007; original French in 2006). Moshe Machover has continued to publish theoretical papers analyzing Israel/Palestine within the broader Middle Eastern framework, and in 2009, together with Ehud Ein-Gil, he published an article in the UK journal Race & Class, titled "Zionism and Oriental Jews: a dialectic of exploitation and co-optation", in which they analyze the question of ethnic divisions within Israel society.

A new book on Matzpen was published in Israel in September 2010, under the title Matzpen: Conscience and Fantasy (Tel Aviv: Resling, 2010). It is the most comprehensive account to date of the organization's history, based on interviews with former activists and a study of documents. In 2020 Lutz Fiedler published a history of Matzpen (Matzpen: A History of Israeli Dissidence, Edinburgh University Press), which one reviewer characterized as "the most comprehensive history now available in English of the anti-Zionist left in Israel."

== Activists associated with Matzpen ==
An incomplete alphabetical list of activists directly or indirectly associated with Matzpen.

- Udi Adiv (Red Front)
- Arie Bober
- Menahem Carmi
- Sylvain Cypel
- Ilan Halevi (b. Georges Alain Albert; Alain/Alan/Ilan Albert/Halevi)
- Haim Hanegbi; Hebrew art.
- Rami Livneh
- Eli Lobel
- Moshé Machover("N. Israeli")
- Jabra Nicola
- Akiva Orr ("N. Israeli")
- Shlomo Sand
- Daud Turki (Red Front)
- Shimon Tzabar
- Lea Tsemel
- Dan Vered
- Michel Warschawski ("Mikado")
