= Khamsin (magazine) =

Socialist magazine (1975-1989)

Khamsin - Journal of Revolutionary Socialists of the Middle East
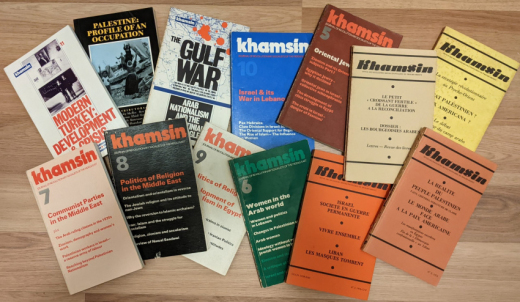
- Editor: Leila Kadi; Eli Lobel
- Categories: Political magazine
- Frequency: Quarterly
- Founder: Moshé Machover; Eli Lobel; Emmanuel Farjoun; Leila Kadi; Sadik Jalal Al Azm
- Founded: 1975
- First issue: 30 June 1975
- Final issue: 1989
- Country: France; United Kingdom
- Based in: Paris; London
- Language: French; English

Khamsin was a socialist magazine which was published first in Paris, France, and then in London, the United Kingdom, between 1975 and 1989. The title of the magazine, Khamsin, was a reference to a desert wind with the same name which occurs in the Middle East. It was edited by the revolutionary socialists from the Middle East, and its subtitle was Journal of revolutionary socialists of the Middle-East.

== History and profile ==
The establishment of a publication by the Matzpen, an Israeli socialist and anti-Zionist organization, first discussed in a meeting of Moshé Machover, Eli Lobel, Emmanuel Farjoun, Leila Kadi and Sadik Jalal Al Azm in London in October 1974. As a result of this meeting Khamsin was launched in Paris, France, in 1975. It was coedited by Lebanese Leila Kadi and Israeli Eli Lobel. The latter was a member of the Matzpen. The first four issues of Khamsin were published in French by the Editions François Maspero based in Paris. The editorial board of the magazine expanded with the addition of Avishai Ehrlich, Moshé Machover, Mikhal Marouan and Khalil Toama in 1978.

From the fifth issue the headquarters of Khamsin moved to London where it was published in English until 1989 when it folded with the publication of the issue numbered 14. In this period Nira Yuval-Davis, a sociology lecturer at Thames Polytechnic, joined its editorial board. The publisher was first Ithaca Press and then Zed Press ( now Zed Books ) in the London period of the magazine. The magazine came out quarterly in London.

== Political stance ==
Khamsin declared its aim in the fifth issue as to be part of the struggles for social liberation and against nationalist and religious mystifications instead of expressing and supporting only some views. The ultimate goal was reported to be the establishment of a united socialist Arab world.

== Content and contributors ==
The content of Khamsin included the analyses of the Matzpen's "Israel as colonial-settler state." argument. The magazine featured articles containing political, economic, social analysis and book reviews. From the issue 5 it published specific content for each issue: Oriental Jewry (issue 5), Women in the Arab World (issue 6), Communist Parties in the Middle East (issue 7), Politics of Religion in the Middle East (issue 8), Politics of Religion/Development of Capitalism in Egypt (issue 9), Israel and its War in Lebanon (issue 10), Modern Turkey: Development and Crisis (issue 11), and The Gulf [Iran–Iraq] War (issue 12).

One of the contributors was Israel Shahak who claimed that Zionism-related politics was originated from the Talmud in an article published in the issue 8 of Khamsin dated 1983.
