= Asma Agbarieh =

Israeli Arab journalist and political activist

Asma Agbarieh-Zahalka
- أسماء إغبارية-زحالقة
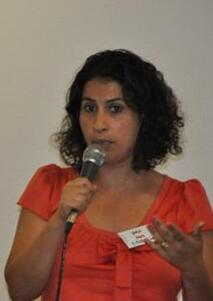
- Asma Agbarieh-Zahalka, 2012
- Born: 1973 (age 52–53); Jaffa, Israel
- Education: Tel Aviv University (Arabic literature, Education and Teaching)
- Occupations: Journalist, Political Activist
- Political party: Organization for Democratic Action (Da'am)
- Spouse: Musa Zahalka
- Children: 1

Asma Agbarieh-Zahalka (Arabic: أسماء إغبارية-زحالقة, Hebrew: אסמא אגבארייה; born 1973) is an Israeli Arab journalist and political activist who heads the Organization for Democratic Action (Da'am) party. She is the only Israeli Arab woman to head a political party.

== Biography ==
Agbarieh was born to a conservative Muslim family and raised in Jaffa. In 1995, after completing her undergraduate studies at Tel Aviv University in Arabic literature and in education and teaching, she started work as an editor for al-Sabar, the Arabic-language edition of the magazine Etgar (challenge) published by the newly founded Da'am party. She joined the party and became active in its socio-political activities, focusing on the city's housing shortage, quality of education, and the status of women.

In 2000, she founded and became the director of the East Jerusalem branch of the Workers’ Advice Center - 'Ma’an', which provides assistance to non-unionized workers and the unemployed. In 2002, she relocated to the Ma'an branch in the Triangle, where she worked on projects aimed at finding employment for laborers and the unemployed in various fields, and in youth education, as well as a project to help those affected by the Wisconsin Project.

=== Political career ===
She was a candidate for Da'am in the elections for the 2003 elections, and headed its list for the 2006, 2009 and 2013 elections. The party failed to cross the electoral threshold on all three occasions, winning no seats.

In November 2008 she ran for mayor of Tel Aviv-Yafo and a seat on its city council. The party received 0.45% of the ballots, which fell below the threshold percentage.

=== Personal life ===
She is married to actor and contractor Musa Zahalka. The couple have a son, born in January 2009, to whom they gave the universalistic name Adam.

Agbarieh is critical of Islam due to perceived restrictions on women as well as aspects of Sharia. She is an atheist.
