= Da'am Workers Party =

Israeli political party

Da'am Workers Party דעם מפלגת פועלים حزب دعم العمالي
- Leader: Asma Agbarieh; Nir Nadar; Ya'akov Ben Efrat; Yoav Gal Tamir
- Chairman: Yoav Gal Tamir
- Founded: 1995
- Split from: Derekh HaNitzotz
- Headquarters: Tel Aviv, Israel
- Ideology: Secularism; Communism; Marxism; Revolutionary socialism Non-Zionism; One-state solution
- Political position: Left-wing to far-left
- Knesset: 0 / 120

Election symbol
- ד (1996) קם (1999) קם (2003–2013) ץ (2019–)

Website
- https://en.daam.org.il/

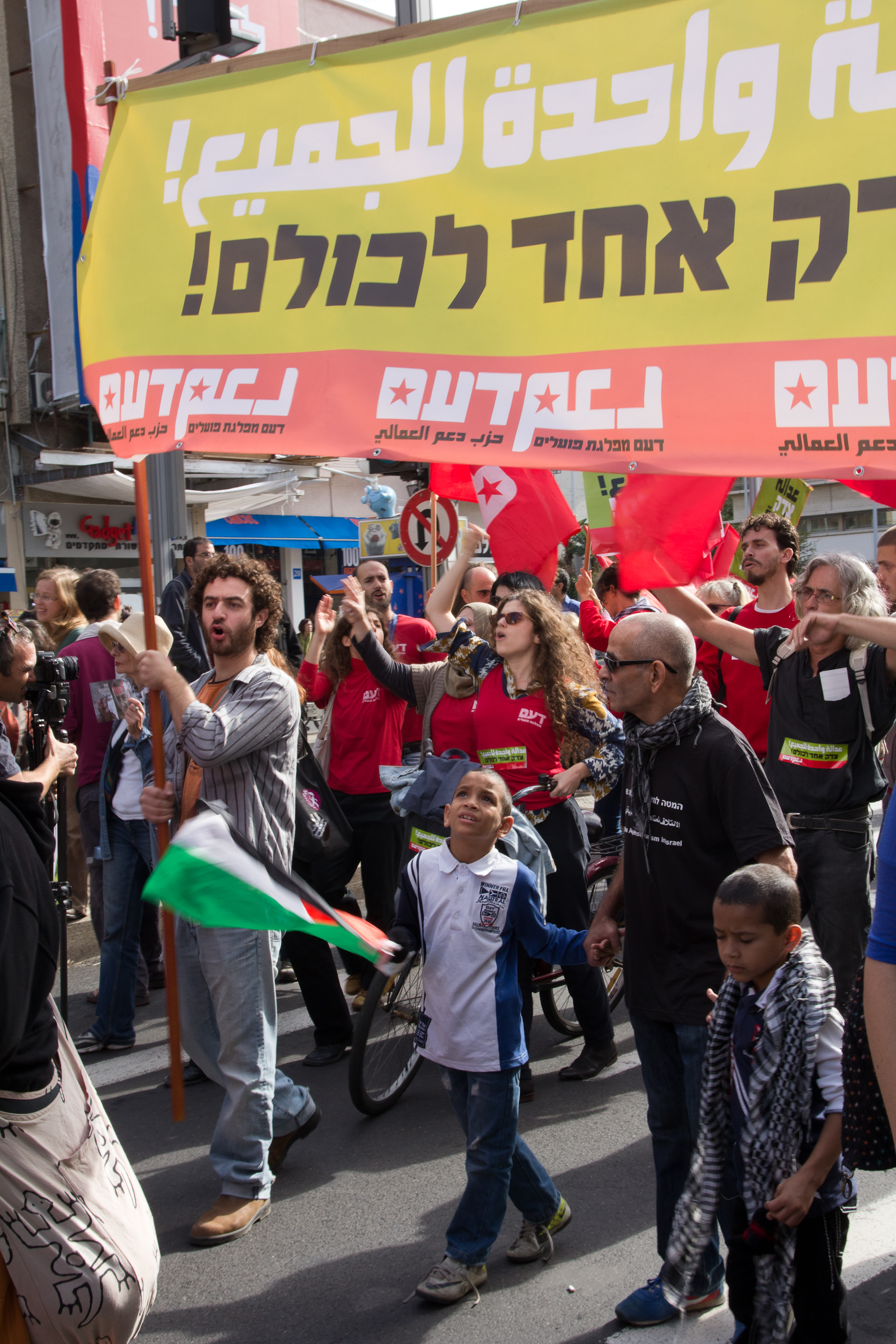
Marching under the Da'am banner, International Human Rights March, Tel Aviv, 7 December 2012

The Da'am Workers Party (Arabic: حزب دعم العمالي, romanized: Hizb Daem Al-umaalii, Hebrew: דעם מפלגת פועלים, romanized: Da'am Mifleget Po'alim) is a revolutionary socialist, multi-ethnic political party in Israel, where it is commonly known by the acronym Da'am (Arabic: دعم, Hebrew: דע"ם). It calls for political and social revolution to secure workers' rights, the nationalization of key industries, Jewish–Arab coexistence, and gender equality.

== Name ==
The name "Da'am" originates from Arabic and is a reverse acronym for the name Organization for Democratic Action (Arabic: منظمة العمل الديمقراطي, munaẓẓamāt al-ʿamal ad-dīmuqrāṭiyy). The name also means "support" in Arabic.

== History ==
The party was founded in Haifa in 1995 as a result of splitting process in the communist camp of Israel; in 1960 Matzpen was founded by former members of the Israeli Communist Party and in the 1970s former members of Matzpen founded three organisations, one of which was the Workers Alliance-Avangard. In 1977 former members of Avangard founded Derekh HaNitzotz (The Way of the Spark). Former members of Derekh HaNitzotz established Da'am in 1995.

In the 1999 elections the party received only 2,151 votes (0.06%), well below the electoral threshold of 1.5%. The 2003 elections saw a fall in support to just 1,925 votes, though its percentage (0.06%) remained roughly the same due to a reduced turnout. Nevertheless, it still did not pass the threshold. In the 2006 elections the party more than doubled its support, receiving 3,692 votes (0.11%). However, with the raising of the threshold to 2%, it was even further away from winning a seat in the Knesset.

In the 2009 elections it again failed to pass the threshold and did not receive any seats. In the 2013 elections it received 3,374 votes (0.09%) and again did not obtain a seat in the Knesset. The party did not contest the 2015 elections. In the 2019 elections the party campaigned with the slogan "Green Economy — One Country", after it decided to support a one-state solution to the Israeli–Palestinian conflict based on post-nationalism instead of a Palestinian state and to emphasize its support for eco-socialism.

== Ideology ==
The party is a joint Arab–Jewish party emphasizing class identity over ethnic or national ones. It is strongly left-wing, supporting workers' rights (particularly those of Israeli Arabs), opposing discrimination, and holding an internationalist worldview. The party had supported the right of the Palestinian people to found an independent state based on the 1967 borders until 2018, after which the party supported a one-state solution based on civic nationalism. The party is against Israeli unilateralism and occupation of the Palestinian territories. It also opposes political Islam.

Members of the party were involved in the establishment of the Workers Advice Center (WAC-Ma’an), "an initiative for building an independent labor association". Ma'an offers support to unemployed and unorganised (non-Union) workers.

In the 2015 Israeli legislative election, it was the only political party in Israel headed by an Israeli Arab woman, Asma Agbarieh.

The party produced the monthly English-language magazine Challenge until it ceased publication in May 2021, as well as the Arabic al Sabar and the Hebrew quarterly Etgar.

== Election results ==
Election	Votes	%	Seats
1996	1,351	0.04	0
1999	2,151	0.06	0
2003	1,925	0.06	0
2006	3,692	0.12	0
2009	2,645	0.08	0
2013	3,546	0.09	0
2015	Did not contest		
April 2019	556	0.01	0
September 2019	592	0.01	0
2020	612	0.01	0
2021	385	0.01	0
2022	Did not contest		
