= Aki Orr =

Israeli political activist

Akiva Orr
- Born: Karl Sebastian Sonnenberg; June 19, 1931; Berlin
- Died: February 7, 2013 (aged 81); Tnuvot, Israel
- Occupations: Writer, political activist

Akiva "Aki" Orr (Hebrew: עקיבא "עקי" אור; born Karl Sebastian Sonnenberg; June 19, 1931 – February 7, 2013) was an Israeli writer and political activist. He was an outspoken critic of Zionism and supported a one-state solution to the Israeli–Palestinian conflict. After 1968 Orr was a leading advocate of radical direct democracy.

== Early life ==
Orr was born in Berlin in 1931. His family left Germany when he was three years old, in the aftermath of the Nazi rise to power, and moved to Mandatory Palestine. Orr grew up in Tel Aviv and attended the First Municipal School of Tel Aviv. He was a keen swimmer and was the Maccabi 200 m breast-stroke champion in 1946 and 1947. In 1946 he joined the Haganah, the Jewish paramilitary organization that was to develop into the Israel Defense Forces following the creation of the State of Israel in 1948. He joined the Israeli Navy, which played a minor role in the 1948 War of Independence.

== Political career ==
=== Maki ===
Orr served in the Israeli Navy until 1950, and then joined the merchant navy. He participated in the Israeli Seamen's Strike of 1951, which lasted 40 days. It was during this time that he became politicized in the wake of a beating incurred at the hands of the Israeli police. In the same year he joined the Israeli Communist Party (Maki). He remained in the merchant navy until 1955, when he moved to Jerusalem to study mathematics and physics at the Hebrew University. There, he served as secretary of the Union of Communist Science Students at the University. Following his graduation in 1958, he started teaching mathematics and physics at the AIU Technical College.

In 1961, Orr published his first major work. Written with Moshe Machover under the pseudonym "A Israeli," Shalom, Shalom ve'ein Shalom (Hebrew: שלום, שלום, ואין שלום; Peace, Peace, and there is no Peace) set out to demonstrate how Israeli Prime Minister Ben-Gurion had colluded with Britain and France in a colonial war against Egypt and to disprove Ben-Gurion's claims that the 1956 Suez War had been a war fought to save Israel from annihilation (see Protocol of Sèvres).

=== Matzpen ===
In 1962, Orr left the Israeli Communist Party and, alongside Machover, Oded Pilavsky and Jeremy Kaplan, formed the Israeli Socialist Organization, better known by the name of its publication, Matzpen. Its founders rejected what they saw as the Israeli Communist Party's unquestioning loyalty to the Soviet Union. They defined "Socialism" as a regime run by workers councils, not by a political party.

Matzpen criticized the Zionist project in Israel as a colonizing project, although they were careful to distinguish it from the European colonialism of the 19th and 20th century, arguing that the Zionists had come to Palestine to expropriate the indigenous population rather than to exploit them economically.

Matzpen remained on the fringes of Israeli politics throughout its existence, never gaining more than a few dozen members, although the group began to receive attention in the Israeli press after the 1967 war and the emergence of the Palestine Liberation Organization.

=== In London ===
Orr left Israel with his wife and daughter in 1964. After arriving in London, Aki began reading Cosmology at King's College alongside Roger Penrose & Stephen Hawking. He co-founded and was on the editorial board of ISRACA (Israeli Revolutionary Action Committee Abroad), an anti-Zionist publication "devoted to a critique of the ideological, cultural and psychological aspects of Political Zionism".

In London, Orr became acquainted with several prominent left-wing intellectuals, such as the Austrian poet Erich Fried, the veteran revolutionary Rosa Meyer-Leviné, the German student leader Rudi Dutschke, and the Trinidadian Marxist and cricketing authority C. L. R. James, with whom he enjoyed close friendships.

In 1968, Orr joined the London-based group Solidarity, a libertarian socialist organization, and befriended its Greek mentor Cornelius Castoriadis. From this time on, Orr became a libertarian socialist (not ideologically bound to the theories of Marx and Lenin). The year 1972 saw the publication of The Other Israel: The Radical Case Against Zionism, a collection of articles and documents by various Matzpen members, including Orr, Machover and Haim Hanegbi, edited by Arie Bober.

In 1984, Ithaca Press published Orr's The Un-Jewish State: the Politics of Jewish Identity in Israel, in which he argued that political Zionism had failed to create a secular Jewish identity.

=== Return to Israel ===
In 1994, Israel: Politics, Myths and Identity Crises was published, a collection of Orr's essays that also dealt with issues arising from the clash between Israel's secular and Jewish identities. By this time, Orr had moved back to Israel (in 1990).

Beginning in the 1970s, Orr lectured in the United Kingdom and Israel to student bodies and political organizations on various aspects of the Arab–Israeli conflict and on direct democracy. He was invited to speak at the 2011 Israeli tent protests on Rothschild Boulevard, Tel Aviv, where he delivered lectures on the Seamen's Strike of 1951 and on direct democracy.

He died in 2013 in Tnuvot.

== Direct democracy ==
Following his conversion to libertarian socialism in the late 1960s, Orr became increasingly active in the promotion of radical direct democracy, which rejects the notion of representative democracy and calls for political decision-making to be placed in the hands of every single citizen.

His ideas were grounded in the events of May 1968 in France. In the wake of this wildcat general strike (opposed at first by all unions and political parties), which at its peak saw 10 million employees on strike for 20 days, thousands of self-managed committees sprang up throughout the country. They did not make any economic demands but asserted their right to run their institutions independently.

Drawing on contemporary reports of the Observer journalists Patrick Seale and Maureen McConville, Orr asserted that the desire of the strikers was not to reform the political system but to replace it entirely by a system of democratic self-governance, in which all employees have a say in the decision-making process. Orr argued that while in 1968 the technology did not exist to enable all citizens to participate in decision making, it exists today. He argued that political corruption is an inherent feature of politics by representatives and of all elections and that only a system of "politics without politicians" can eliminate corruption.

Orr wrote and distributed two major works on direct democracy, Politics without Politicians, an outline of the central tenets of direct democracy, and Big Business, Big Government or Direct Democracy: Who Should Shape Society?, a history of the 20th century viewed in terms of the conflict between state and private control of the economy, a conflict that he regarded as the defining feature of the epoch. He argued that a system of direct democracy is the only viable alternative to "big government states" or "big business states", both of which he viewed as oppressive forms of governance.

== Works ==
English

- 1972 – The Other Israel: the Radical Case against Zionism, ed. Arie Bober, with contributions by various Matzpen members (Doubleday)
- 1984 – The Un-Jewish State: The Politics of Jewish Identity in Israel (Ithaca Press)
- 1994 – Israel: Politics, Myths and Identity Crises (Pluto Press)
- 2005 – Politics without Politicians (self-published, available online)
- 2007 – Big Business, Big Government or Direct Democracy: Who Should Shape Society? (World Power Politics of the 20th Century and their Lesson) (self-published, available online)

Hebrew

- 1961 – Peace Peace & There is No Peace - Shalom, Shalom ve'ein Shalom (with Moshe Machover)
- 2002 – Alternative to a Psychotic State
- 2003 – From Protest to Revolution (Five talks to young activists)
- 2005 – Flashbacks (recollections of London)
