= Felicia Langer =

German-Israeli attorney and activist (1930–2018)

- פליציה לנגר
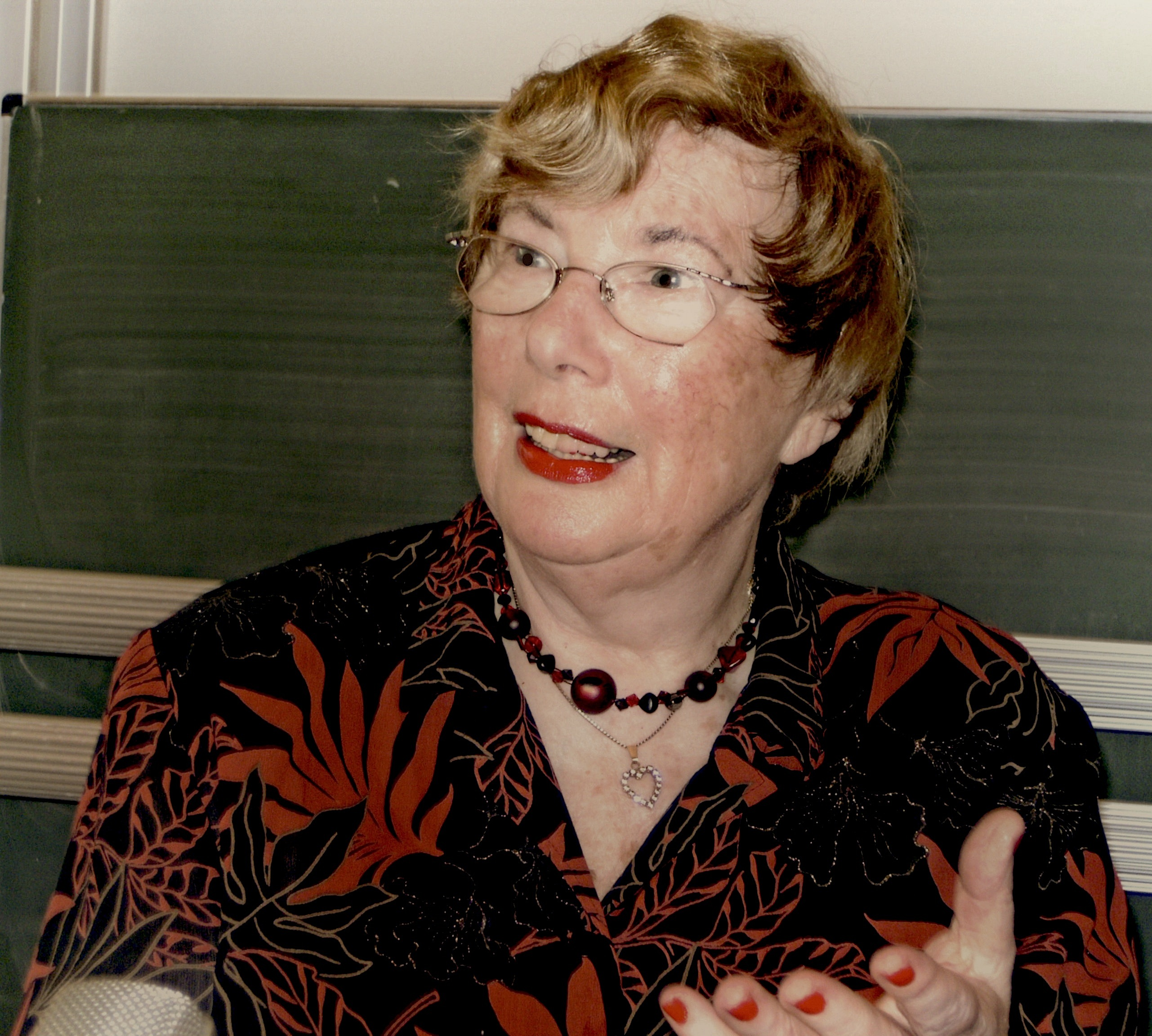
- Langer in 2008
- Born: 9 December 1930; Tarnów, Poland
- Died: 21 June 2018 (aged 87); Tübingen, Germany
- Occupations: Activist, lawyer, writer
- Awards: Right Livelihood Award

Felicia Langer (Hebrew: פליציה לנגר; 9 December 1930 – 21 June 2018) was a German-Israeli attorney and human rights activist known for her defence of Palestinian political prisoners in the West Bank and Gaza Strip. She authored several books alleging human rights violations on the part of Israeli authorities. She lived in Germany from 1990 and acquired German citizenship in 2008. In July 2009, President of Germany Horst Köhler awarded her the Federal Cross of Merit, First class, which is the fifth highest of Germany's federal order of merit's eight ranks. The bestowal triggered a public controversy because of her attitude towards the Israeli-Palestinian conflict. In 1990, she was awarded the Right Livelihood Award for "the exemplary courage of her advocacy for the basic rights of the Palestinian people."

== Youth in Eastern Europe ==
Felicia-Amalia Langer (born Felicia Veitt) was born to Jewish parents in the Polish town of Tarnów in 1930. Her father was a lawyer, and the family enjoyed a comfortable lifestyle during her early childhood. In 1939, her family fled from the German invasion to the Soviet Union. They went first to the Urals, and then to Kazakhstan. During this time, the family, struggled to find enough food, and at one point, her parents were forced to sell her prized shoes. This meant she was unable to attend school, and her father had to homeschool her. Her father was jailed for refusing to take a Soviet passport, and although he was released, he suffered a heart attack and his heath quickly declined, until he died in 1945. Aside from her mother, none of her other relatives had survived the Holocaust.. In 1949, she married Mieciu Langer in Breslau, a survivor of Nazi concentration camps who had lost his entire family in the Holocaust.

== Time in Israel ==
In 1950, the young couple immigrated to Israel, where their son was born in 1953. In 1959 she began to study law at Hebrew University of Jerusalem, where she obtained a law degree in 1965.

She briefly worked for a Tel Aviv law firm, but then opened up her own lawyer's office in 1966. After the 1967 Six-Day War, she was opposed to the conduct of the Israeli occupation of the West Bank and Gaza, and so established a private practice in Jerusalem defending Palestinian political detainees. Langer was the first lawyer to assist Palestinians in cases involving land confiscation, house demolition, deportation, and torture before Israeli military courts.

Langer only infrequently won cases in her 23-year career. In 1977, she lost her licence to defend Israeli conscientious objectors before Israeli courts and could be excluded from proceedings at any time on security grounds.

Langer counted her 1979 successful defense of Nablus mayor Bassam Shaka as the high point of her career. Shaka had been a PLO supporter and outspoken critic of the Camp David accords, was subsequently accused of inciting terrorism by his public statements and was issued an expulsion order. Langer defended him successfully, having the expulsion order overturned by the Israeli Supreme Court.

For many years Langer was vice president of the Israeli League for Human and Civil Rights. The Palestinian scholar Sami Hadawi said of Langer that "much credit and gratitude is due for her defence, at great personal risk, of Arab detainees and prisoners."

She later joined the communist Rakah party, in which she became a central committee member.

In 1990 she departed from the party after an internal conflict of orientation, closed her lawyer's office and moved to Germany with her husband. In an interview with The Washington Post, Langer said she quit because Palestinians no longer can expect justice in Israel.

== Time in Germany ==
From 1990, she lived in Tübingen, Baden-Württemberg, Germany, and acquired German citizenship in 2008. She accepted teaching positions at the universities of Bremen and Kassel and continued to author books which have been translated into several languages. She became patron of the association Refugees' Children in Lebanon which assists Palestinian refugee families. After March 2009 she supported the newly founded Russell Tribunal for Palestine.

In her writings, lectures and interviews she criticized Israeli policy in the occupied Palestinian territories, which she considered equivalent to an annexation. Langer furthermore considered the construction of Israeli settlements in the West Bank as undermining the possibility of a two-state solution and demanded the complete and unconditional retreat of Israel from the territories conquered in 1967 and a right to return for any descendant of the Palestinian refugees.

Langer headed a legal team to defend the journalists who had been arrested following the closure of the Israeli newspaper Derekh HaNitzotz in February 1988.

In 1990, Langer received the Right Livelihood Award "for the exemplary courage of her struggle for the basic rights of the Palestinian people."

In 1991, she was awarded the Bruno Kreisky Award for Outstanding Achievements in the Area of Human Rights.

In 2002, she declared that whereas the Palestinian terror attacks were unjustifiable, the Israeli policy had "paved the way" for them. Within this context, she adopted the opinion of the deputy chairman of the German Liberal Party (FDP) Jürgen Möllemann, who had called the targeted killings of Palestinian subjects by Israeli security forces an act of state terror. In 2003, she wrote the preface to a book written by Jamal Karsli.

In 2005, Langer was awarded the Erich Mühsam Prize for her continuing struggle for the human rights of the Palestinian people.

She was a supporter of the Campaign for the Establishment of a United Nations Parliamentary Assembly, an organisation which campaigns for democratic reformation of the United Nations.

== Death ==
Felicia Langer died on 21 June 2018, aged 87, in Tübingen, Germany.

== Federal Cross of Merit ==
Langer was awarded the Federal Cross of Merit, First class, by the President of Germany Horst Köhler following the nomination by the government of Baden-Württemberg, itself based on suggestions by the publicist Evelyn Hecht-Galinski and the city of Tübingen. At the award ceremony, on 16 July 2009 in Stuttgart, the decoration was bestowed by Hubert Wicker, a senior civil servant of Baden-Württemberg's chancellery.

The official award acknowledges a lifetime effort of Langer for peace, justice and the respect of human rights, as well as her efforts for people in need of help without regard of their nationality or religion and independently of their personal political, or religious motivation or worldview. He furthermore mentioned her childhood and youth rife with distress, war, persecution and flight.

=== Discussion about the award ===
The federal state government led by Günther Oettinger had adopted the proposal after having consulted all commonly involved positions including the Federal Department of Foreign Affairs.

The decision has been criticized by several Jewish municipalities as well as several prominent German Jews, Jewish and pro-Israeli organizations like the Central Council of Jews in Germany, the New York-based American Jewish Committee and the Deutsch-Israelischen Gesellschaft. Polish-German journalist and author Henryk Broder assumed that Köhler had made the decision, ignoring Langer's statements criticizing Israel.

The deputy president of the Central Council of Jews in Germany Dieter Graumann declared in an interview, Germany had awarded a person who had been demonising Israel professionally, chronically and obsessively.

Arno Lustiger, Ralph Giordano and Arno Hamburger announced their intent to return their Federal Crosses of Merit if Langer's award was not revoked. They said Langer had compared the Israeli policy to the Holocaust and described her as a long-time "enemy of Israel" guilty of the "devastating effect" of a common German desideratum to disburden the own guiltiness by criticizing Israel.

Langer said she never compared the Israeli foreign policy to the Holocaust, but considered it as a policy of apartheid. Giordano later withdrew his announcement to return his award, maintaining his critique.

The Israeli travellers' guide, Motke Shomrat, known for his advocacy for the conciliation between Israel and Germany, and honoured with a Federal Cross of Merit, returned it on 24 July 2009, as Langer had supposedly consented anti-Israeli statements of Mahmoud Ahmadinejad, which was denied by Langer. Federal Cross of Merit holder Ralph Giordano said: "No one in the last 25 years, with a one-sidedness bordering on blindness, has done Israel more damage than this supposed human-rights lawyer."

The American Jewish Committee wrote a letter to Köhler condemning the award. The letter expresses an "astonishment at the decision to honour an individual who for many years was an apologist for a regime which brought untold fear and misery upon the citizens of eastern Germany", and refers to her membership of the Israeli Communist Party.

A sharp criticism in German newspapers was mentioned by the spokesman of the Israeli ministry of foreign affairs Yigal Palmor. He said that Langer had a long track of supporting forces in benefit of violence, death and extremism.

As a result of the criticism, and in response to Arno Hamburger´s return of his award, Gert Haller, the highest ranking state secretary in the office of the President of Germany, Horst Köhler, wrote a letter to Hamburger saying that the grievance caused by the awarding was "terribly unfortunate." After requests by Hamburger he stated there was no legal basis to withdraw the award.

Educationist Micha Brumlik criticized Langer's conduct, argumentation and choice of words as too one-sided. He considers that making Israel the only responsible for the situation in the Middle East is typical of an anti-Semitic pattern of argumentation. Nevertheless, she might deserve the Federal Cross of Merit on the merits of calling the attention to the permanent violations of the human rights of the Arab population in the occupied territories on the behalf of Israel.

The mayor of Tübingen, Boris Palmer, and the government of Baden-Württemberg defended the bestowal, arguing that it rewarded Langer's lifework rather than her ideology.

Langer characterised the criticisms of her distinction on 23 July 2009 as a smear campaign supposed to suppress criticism against Israel and rejected to return the Federal Cross of Merit. Several elected officials, including the Mayor of Tübingen Boris Palmer and representatives of the Government of Baden-Württemberg, underlined their support for the award.

== Books by Felicia Langer ==
Langer's books discuss the torture of detainees, routine violation of international law prohibiting deportation, as well as collective punishment.

- With My Own Eyes (1975)
- These Are My Brothers (1979)
- An Age of Stone (1987)
- Fury and Hope (1993) (autobiographical)
- Appearance and Truth in Palestine (1999)
- Miecius Report. Youth between the Ghetto and Theresienstadt (1999)
- Quo vadis Israel? The new Intifada of the Palestinians (2001)
- Books in German
- Die Zeit der Steine, Aus dem Hebräischen. Lamuv, Göttingen 1989; ISBN 9783889773791
- Zorn und Hoffnung. Aus dem Hebräischen. Lamuv, Göttingen 1991; ISBN 3-88977-440-7
- Brücke der Träume. Eine Israelin geht nach Deutschland. Aus dem Hebräischen. Lamuv, Göttingen 1994, ISBN 3-88977-385-0.
- Wo Hass keine Grenzen kennt: eine Anklageschrift. Aus dem Hebräischen und aus dem Englischen. Lamuv, Göttingen 1995; ISBN 3-88977-397-4
- «Laßt uns wie Menschen leben!» Schein und Wirklichkeit in Palästina. Aus dem Hebräischen und aus dem Englischen. Lamuv, Göttingen 1999; ISBN 3-88977-538-1
- Miecius später Bericht: eine Jugend zwischen Getto und Theresienstadt. Aus dem Hebräischen. Lamuv, Göttingen 1999; ISBN 3-88977-539-X
- Quo vadis, Israel? Die neue Intifada der Palästinenser. Aus dem Englischen. Lamuv, Göttingen 2001; ISBN 3-88977-615-9
- Brandherd Nahost. Oder: Die geduldete Heuchelei. Aus dem Englischen. Lamuv, Göttingen 2004; ISBN 3-88977-644-2
- Die Frau, die niemals schweigt. Stationen eines Lebens. Lamuv, Göttingen 2005; ISBN 3-88977-664-7
- Die Entrechtung der Palästinenser. 40 Jahre israelische Besatzung. Aus dem Englischen. Lamuv, Göttingen 2006, ISBN 3-88977-680-9.
- Um Hoffnung kämpfen. Lamuv, Göttingen 2008, ISBN 3-88977-688-4.
- Mit Leib und Seele - Autobiographische Notizen. Zambon, Frankfurt am Main 2012, ISBN 978-3-88975-201-7.

== Awards ==
- Hans-Litten-Award - Union of Democratic Advocates (1988)
- Right Livelihood Award (1990)
- Honorary Citizen of Nazaret (1990)
- Bruno Kreisky Award - Merit of Human Rights (1991)
- Under the top 50 of the most important women in Israel - Elected by the magazine "YOU" (1998)
- Erich Mühsam Award of the Erich-Mühsam-Association (2005)
- Human Rights Award - Association Protecting Human Rights and Human Dignity (2006)
- Federal Cross of Merit, First Class (2009)
- Palestinian Medal for Exceptional Merits (2012)
