= Jews Against Zionism =

1990 book by Thomas A. Kolsky about the American Council for Judaism

Jews Against Zionism: The American Council for Judaism, 1942-1948
- Front cover of Jews Against Zionism
- Author: Thomas A. Kolsky
- Language: English
- Subject: Anti-Zionist Reform Judaism then-proposed establishment of the State of Israel.
- Publisher: Temple University Press
- Publication date: 1990
- Publication place: United States
- Media type: hardback
- Pages: 269 pp
- ISBN: 0-87722-694-6
- OCLC: 20490845
- Dewey Decimal: 320.5/4095694 20
- LC Class: DS149.A1 K65 1990

Jews Against Zionism: The American Council for Judaism, 1942-1948 is a 1990 book by Thomas A. Kolsky, a professor of history and political science at Montgomery County Community College, based on his doctoral dissertation at The George Washington University.

In Jews Against Zionism, Kolsky describes the history of the American Council for Judaism, an organization specifically created to fight against both Zionism and a Jewish state.

== Reviews ==
- Barbara Burstin; Kolsky, Thomas A. (December 1991). "Review of Jews Against Zionism: The American Council for Judaism, 1942-1948 by Thomas A. Kolsky". Journal of American History. 78 (3). Organization of American Historians: 1138. doi:10.2307/2078931. JSTOR 2078931.
- Murray Polner (1990-10-14). "Review of Jews Against Zionism: The American Council for Judaism, 1942-1948 by Thomas A. Kolsky". The New York Times. https://www.nytimes.com/1990/10/14/books/israel-haunted.html
- Robert Rockaway (May 1992). "Review of Jews Against Zionism: The American Council for Judaism, 1942-1948 by Thomas A. Kolsky". International Journal of Middle East Studies. 24 (2): 334–335. doi:10.1017/s0020743800021735. S2CID 164102277.
- Roselle Tekiner (Spring 1991). "Review of Jews Against Zionism: The American Council for Judaism, 1942-1948 by Thomas A. Kolsky". Journal of Palestine Studies. 20 (3): 125–126. doi:10.1525/jps.1991.20.3.00p0254n.

== See also ==
- Jewish Anti-Zionism
- Neturei Karta
