= Haim Hanegbi =

Palestinian Jewish political activist (1935–2018)

- חיים הנגבי
- Born: Haim Nissim Bajayo; 1935; Jerusalem, Mandate Palestine
- Died: 2 March 2018 (aged 82–83)
- Education: Hebrew University of Jerusalem
- Occupation: Journalist

Haim Hanegbi (Hebrew: חיים הנגבי; 1935 – 2 March 2018) was a Israeli leftist political activist. He was a journalist and writer and a cofounder of the dissident group Matzpen.

== Early life and education ==
He was born Haim Nissim Bajayo in Jerusalem in 1935. His grandfather, Haim Bajayo, was the last rabbi in Hebron.

Hanegbi was a graduate of Hebrew University.

== Career and activities ==
Hanegbi worked for the news magazine HaOlam HaZeh which was led by Uri Avnery. Hanegbi was one of the founders of the socialist and anti-Zionist group, Matzpen, which was established in 1962. He established a committee consisting of Hebronite Jews to stop settlements in Hebron in 1967. He became the spokesperson for the Israeli Radical Left when other Matzpen founders, Aki Orr and Moshé Machover, left Israel and settled in London following the Six-Day War in 1967. Hanegbi published articles in different media outlets including MERIP.

=== Views ===
Hanegbi was a supporter of the two-state solution to the Israeli–Palestinian conflict until the late summer of 2003 arguing that it was the only solution to the conflict. Then, he supported the one-state solution on a binational basis concerning the conflict. The model he advocated included a federation between Palestinians and Israelis who would have the executive, legislative and constitutional authorities on an equal and agreed basis.

== Death ==
Hanegbi died on 2 March 2018.
