= Moshé Machover =

Israeli-British anti-Zionist activist (born 1936)

- משה מחובר
- Born: 1936 (age 89–90); Tel Aviv, Mandatory Palestine
- Citizenship: British
- Education: Hebrew University of Jerusalem
- Scientific career
- Fields: Mathematics; Philosophy
- Workplaces: King's College London
- Doctoral advisors: Andrzej Mostowski; Michael Oser Rabin
- Doctoral students: Paul Ernest

Moshé Machover (Hebrew: משה מחובר; born 1936) is a mathematician, philosopher, and socialist activist, noted for his writings against Zionism. Born to a Jewish family in Tel Aviv, then part of the British Mandate of Palestine, Machover moved to Britain in 1968 where he became a naturalised citizen. He was a founder of Matzpen, the Israeli Socialist Organisation, in 1962.

== Career ==
Machover has written extensively on the conflict in the Middle East. In 1961, while still members of the Israeli Communist Party, Machover and Akiva Orr, under the pseudonym 'A Israeli', wrote the anti-Zionist analysis of the Arab-Israeli conflict Shalom, Shalom ve'ein Shalom (Hebrew: שלום, שלום, ואין שלום; "Peace, Peace, and there is no Peace"). The intention of the book was to explain, from publicly available sources, why in 1956 "Ben-Gurion preferred to invade Egypt, alongside France and Britain, rather than to make peace with Egypt". In the course of writing the book, "It became clear to us that the roots of the Israeli–Arab conflict lay, not in the conflict between Israel and the Arab states, but rather in the conflict between Zionist colonialism and the Palestinians over the land of Palestine and its independence".

This thesis was an implicit challenge to the line of the Israeli Communist Party, which considered Israel's alliance with the U.S. to be a matter of political choice, not deriving from the colonial nature of the state. When Machover and Orr followed this by criticising the party's adherence to the Soviet line, and called for the publication of the party's history, they were expelled. Machover and Orr, together with others expelled at the same time, then established Matzpen.

Together with Jabra Nicola (pen name A. Said), Machover developed the position, adopted by Matzpen, that the solution to the Israeli Palestinian problem is in a struggle to defeat Zionism and its allies – imperialism and Arab Reaction – and "rally to itself a wider struggle for the political and social liberation of the Middle East as a whole". The struggle for Palestinian liberation can succeed only when the Palestinian and Israeli masses enter "a joint struggle with the revolutionary forces in the Arab world".

Machover was a lecturer in mathematics at the Hebrew University of Jerusalem from 1960 to 1964, and again from 1966 to 1968; during 1964–66, he was a visiting lecturer at the University of Bristol in England. In 1968, Machover moved permanently to London where he became Reader in Mathematical Logic at King's College London until 1995. He joined Kings from the Chelsea College of Science and Technology's Department of History and Philosophy of Science which was merged into the Philosophy Department in 1993. Since 1995, he has been Professor of Philosophy at the University of London.

In London, together with Orr and Shimon Tzabar, Machover established the Israeli Revolutionary Action Committee Abroad. In 1971, Machover, Orr and Haim Hanegbi published an article in the New Left Review on "The Class Nature of Israeli Society". This article, which has been frequently republished, is included together with several more of Machover's early writings on the Middle East in the collection The Other Israel: the radical case against Zionism.

In 1975, Machover was one of the founders of Khamsin, the "journal of revolutionary socialists of the Middle East". Many of his articles from Khamsin are included in the collection Forbidden Agendas. In 2012, Haymarket Press published a collection of Machover's essays from 1966 to 2010, under the title Israelis and Palestinians Conflict and Resolution.

== October 2017 expulsion and readmission into the Labour Party ==
Machover is a Labour Party member of the Hampstead and Kilburn Constituency Labour Party. In October 2017, he was expelled from the Labour Party on suspicion that of being associated with the Communist Party of Great Britain (Provisional Central Committee), in contravention of party rules. The expulsion came when an article he wrote for the CPGB (PCC)'s newspaper, the Weekly Worker was being investigated as, according to the party's head of disputes, it "appears to meet the International Holocaust Remembrance Alliance definition of antisemitism". The Guardian subsequently published a letter of protest undersigned by 139 Labour Party members, including Sir Geoffrey Bindman, dismissing the insinuation of anti-Semitism as "personally offensive and politically dangerous". His expulsion was rescinded on 30 October.

== Personal life ==
Machover's son Daniel Machover is a solicitor in London, specialising in human and civil rights cases.

== Technical publications ==
- Lectures on Non-Standard Analysis (with J. Hirschfeld, 1969)
- A Course in Mathematical Logic (with J. L. Bell, 1977)
- Laws of Chaos: A Probabilistic Approach to Political Economy (with E. Farjoun, London, 1983)
- Set Theory, Logic and their Limitations (1996)
- The Measurement of Voting Power: Theory and Practice, Problems and Paradoxes (with D. Felsenthal, 1998).

== Selected books ==
- Peace, Peace and there is no Peace (with Akiva Orr) (Hebrew), (English)
- The Other Israel: the radical case against Zionism
- Israelis and Palestinians: Conflict and Resolution, Haymarket Books, Paperback, February 2012
