= Jabra Nicola =

Palestinian politician and Trotskyist (1912–1974)

- جبرا نقولا
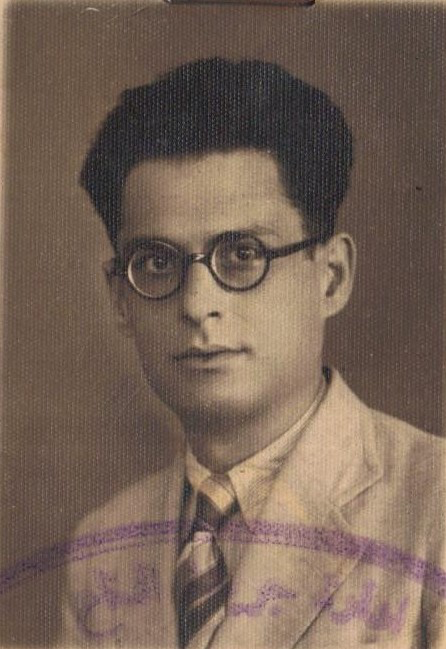
- Nicola's press card ID photo c. 1944

Member of the International Executive Committee of the Fourth International
- In office 1963–1974

Personal details
- Born: 16 February 1912 Haifa, Ottoman Empire
- Died: 25 December 1974 (aged 62) London, England
- Party: Palestine Communist Party, Matzpen
- Domestic partner: Aliza Novik
- Children: 3
- Occupation: Trotskyist leader, writer, translator
- Known for: Theses on the Revolution in the Arab East, Arab Revolution and National Problems in the Arab East

Jabra Nicola (Arabic: جبرا نقولا, Hebrew: ג'ברא ניקולא; 16 February 1912 – 25 December 1974) was a Palestinian Arab Israeli Trotskyist leader, the author of numerous articles and pamphlets who also translated some of the classics of Marxism into Arabic. Born in Haifa, he joined the Palestine Communist Party before he turned 20, and was responsible for its publication al-Ittihad.

The Communist Party split along nationalist lines in 1939, and Jabra Nicola refused to join either wing, and, after being imprisoned by the British occupation from 1940–1942, was recruited to a small Trotskyist movement by Yigael Gluckstein, later better known as Tony Cliff. However, with the collapse of the group in the late 1940s, Jabra Nicola returned to the Palestinian Communist Party. While in the Communist Party he played a leading role on the party's publications, but when, after 1962, a small new left movement, the Matzpen group, revived in what was now Israel, he was to join it for a second and final time.

Placed under house arrest in 1967 after the Six-Day War, he then left Israel for London in 1970, where he lived until his death in 1974.

In 1963, Nicola was elected to the International Executive Committee of the Fourth International, for which he wrote many articles and pamphlets, and translated Marxist classics into Arabic. His most important theoretical essays were Theses on the Revolution in the Arab East ) (1972) and Arab Revolution and National Problems in the Arab East (1973), written together with Moshé Machover.

Jabra Nicola lived with political activist Aliza Novik (b. 1912, Tiberias, d. 1970 Haifa), with whom he had three children.
