= Daud Turki =

Palestinian politician

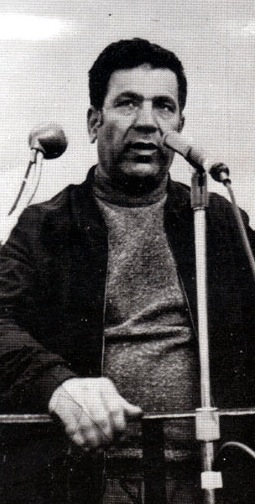
Daud Turki during his trial

Daud Turki (Arabic: داوود تركي), also known by the kunya Abu Aida (Arabic: أبو عائدة), (1927 – March 8, 2009), was a Palestinian poet with Israeli citizenship. He was the leader of the anti-Zionist left-wing group the Red Front, an offshoot of Matzpen. He was convicted of treason and spent 17 years in Israeli prison, in what the Israeli Security Agency considers one of its notable affairs.

== Early life ==
Daud Turki was born in 1927 to a Palestinian Christian family from the Galilee village of al-Maghar, located between Nazareth and Lake Tiberias. He grew up in Haifa. His father Simaan Daud was killed by British troops in Haifa during the 1936–1939 Arab revolt in Palestine. Daud's mother Sadi'a Khouri was also from Maghar. His grandfather was Turki. After the establishment of Israel in 1948, his immediate family fled Haifa for the Druze village of Beit Jann. He married Khazna Daud and had three daughters: Aida, Georget, and Nidal.

== Political activity ==
Daud was an Arab nationalist and a Marxist. He was a founding member of the Palestine Communist Party branch in Haifa in Mandatory Palestine. After the establishment of Israel, he joined the Israeli Communist Party, known by the acronym Maki. He and his extended family were expelled from Maki in 1963 for his pro-China views and advocacy for the Palestinian Right of Return. His family joined Maki's pro-Palestinian offshoot Rakah, which merged with other leftwing parties to form Hadash.

== Arrest and release ==
He was arrested in December 1972 and sentenced to 17 years in prison in March 1973 on charges of treason. He was released on May 20, 1985, as part of the "Galilee" prisoner exchange deal between Israel and the Popular Front for the Liberation of Palestine - General Command.

After his release, he published a collection of poems he had written in prison called "the Wind of Struggle" (ريح الجهاد). He also wrote memoirs titled "Rebel from the Arab East" (ثائر من الشرق العربي).

== Death ==
Daud Turki died at the age of 82 on March 8, 2009, reportedly from lung cancer.

== See also ==
- Ehud Adiv

== Sources ==
- "The Red Front Trial". Journal of Palestine Studies. 2 (4): 128–129. Summer 1973. doi:10.2307/2535644. JSTOR 2535644.
- "The Red Front Trial: The Depositions of Turki and Adiv". Journal of Palestine Studies. 2 (4): 144–150. Summer 1973. doi:10.2307/2535650. JSTOR 2535650.
