= Ilan Halevi =

Jewish Palestinian journalist, politician (1943–2013)

- إيلان هاليفي
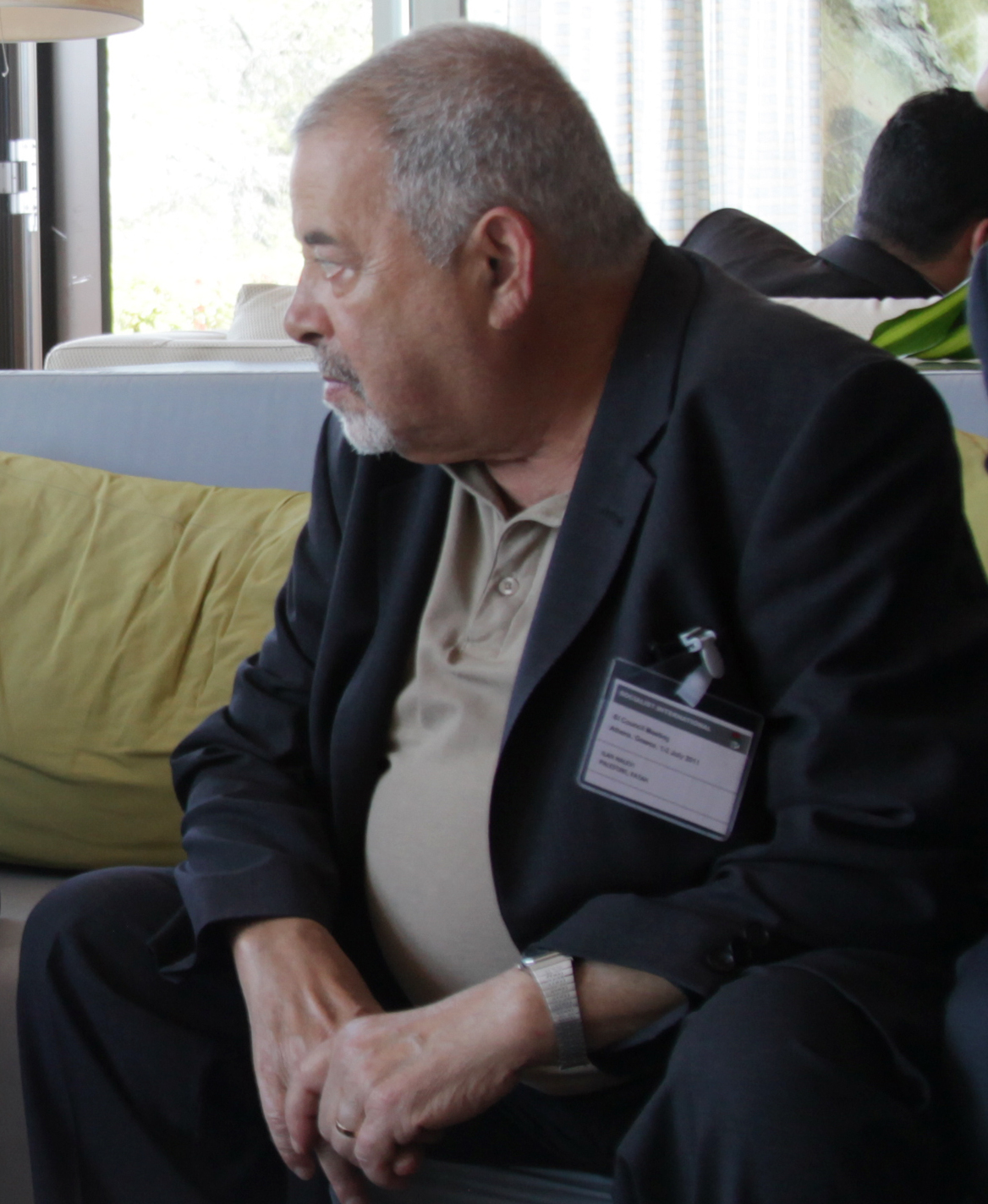

Deputy Minister of Foreign Affairs
- In office 1994–2013
- President: Mahmoud Abbas; Yasser Arafat
- Succeeded by: Ammar Hijazi

Member of the Fatah Revolutionary Council
- In office 2008–2013
- Leader: Mahmoud Abbas

Vice-Minister of Foreign Affairs to the PLO in the Madrid Conference
- In office 1991–1994 Co-leading with Haidar Abdel-Shafi
- Leader: Yasser Arafat

Personal details
- Born: Georges Alain Albert; 12 October 1943 Lyon, France
- Died: 10 July 2013 (aged 69) Clichy, Hauts-de-Seine, France
- Occupation: Journalist, activist, politician, writer

Ilan Halevi (Arabic: إيلان هاليفي; Hebrew: אִילָן הַלֵּוִי; born Georges Alain Albert in France; 12 October 1943 – 10 July 2013) was a French-Palestinian journalist, politician and pro-Palestinian activist. He was one of the very few high-ranking Jewish members of the Palestine Liberation Organization (PLO). Halevi served in the Ministry of Foreign Affairs for the Palestinian government and the Palestine Liberation Organization, as well as a member of Fatah Revolutionary Council.

He was a member of the Palestinian delegation in the 1991–93 negotiations in Madrid and Washington, and was Assistant Deputy Minister for Foreign Affairs in the Palestinian Government. Writing in both French and English, he was also a novelist and the author of non-fiction books. His publications include The Crossing (1964), Face à la guerre (2003), and Allers-retours (2005).

== Early life ==
=== Background ===
He was born to a Jewish family in Lyon, France, in 1943, "under a false name ... in a post-office that was a Resistance hide-out", as his older brother Marc Albert has confirmed. After the death of their father, Henri Levin (who had been born in Poland to Russian-Jewish parents), his mother Blanche married Emile Albert and he adopted her four children. (Some sources mistakenly state that his father was a Yemeni Jew whose family had settled in Jerusalem at the beginning of the 20th century; according to Halevi's brother Marc, when Halevi went to Israel "he obtained a passport with the testimony of a Yemenite residing there – the reason that this origin is sometimes given as his.")

He is also known by other names, such as Alain Albert; Alan Albert; Georges Levin.

=== Literary beginnings ===
In the early 1960s, writing as "Alan Albert", he had work published in the literary journals Les Temps modernes and Présence Africaine, notably discussing both the Algerian war of independence and the system of racial oppression in the American South in his 1962 essay "Study in Brown (II): De la Mentalité Coloniale". With Ellen Wright, widow of African-American writer Richard Wright, as his literary agent, Halevi had his first novel, The Crossing, published in 1964 in the United States, under the name Alain Albert. It was favourably reviewed, described by Lillian Smith in The Saturday Review as "a brilliant, mind-smacking account of a young man's journey from nowhere to hell....a fresh way of looking at the multileveled agony of the walled-in young."

== Political life ==
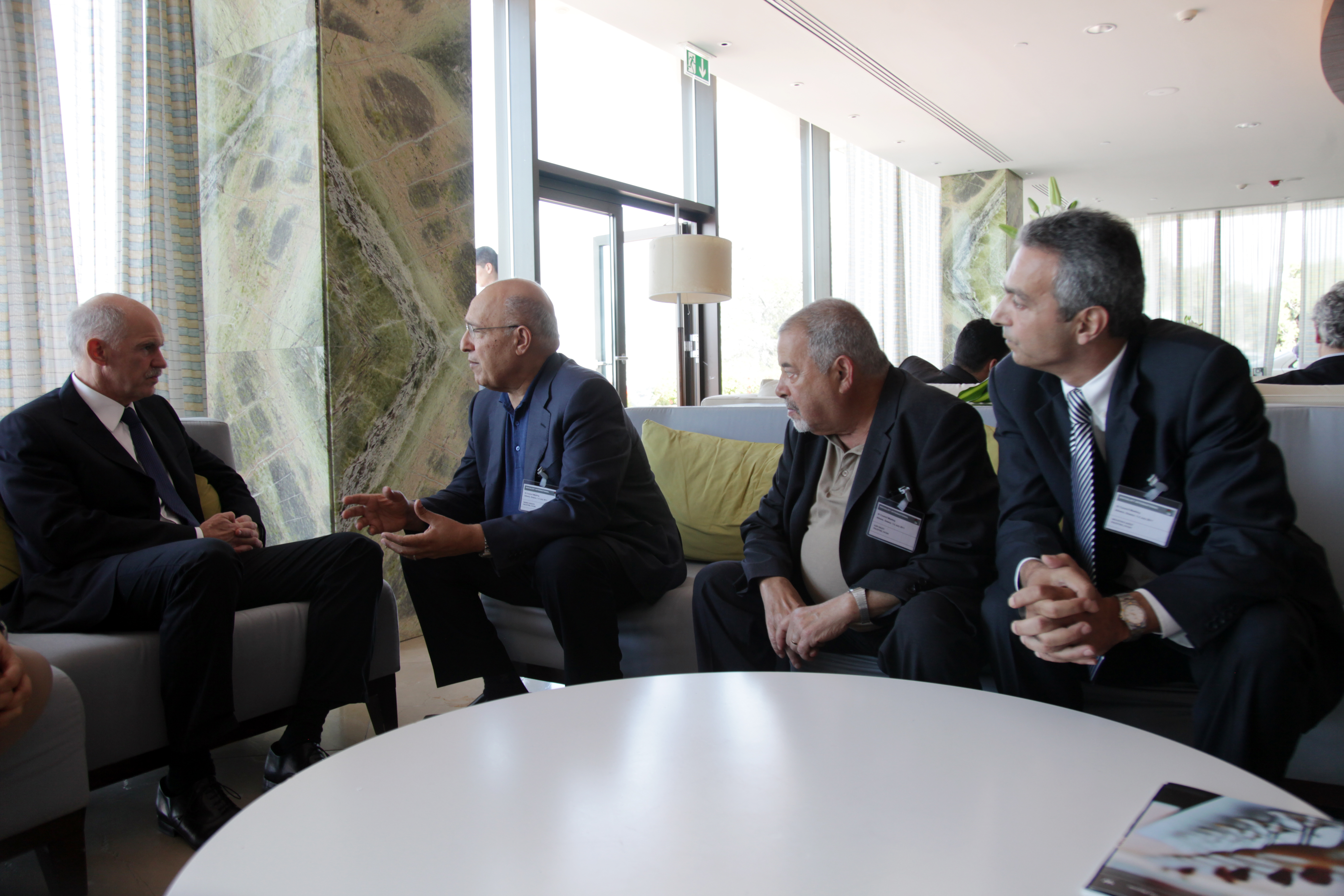
George Papandreou, Nabeel Shaath, Halevi and Moustafa Ajouz

Following visits to Africa, including to Mali and Algeria, in 1965, at the age of 22, Halevi moved to Israel. He is quoted as having said: "I came to Israel because in Algeria I discovered the importance of the Palestinian problem. I sat there in coffee houses, I heard people, I spoke with intellectuals and I understood that the Palestinian question preoccupies the people of the Arab world. It is really in the center of their obsessions. I decided I want to study this reality up close and from the inside…I wanted to study the Israeli reality."

Halevi joined the Palestinian resistance movement and Fatah in particular after the 1967 Arab–Israeli war, and subsequently became a prominent member of the PLO. He was the PLO's representative in Europe and to the Socialist International since 1983, former PLO vice-minister of Foreign Affairs, and participated in that capacity in the Madrid Conference of 1991. He was also a member of the Fatah Revolutionary Council, elected in 2009, and served as an adviser to Yasser Arafat.

According to Hanan Ashrawi (in This Side of Peace, 1996), in the early 1970s, Halevi was a member of Ma'avak (Struggle), a "small, radical Israeli anti-Zionist group". In the wake of the 1973 Yom Kippur War, and subsequent shift of Palestinian activism into the Occupied Territories, he switched his activity to groups which included Israelis and Palestinians working together against the occupation, and helped secure permission for Bashir Barghouti, a Palestinian activist and member of the Jordanian Communist Party's governing council, to return to the West Bank.

Halevi was a critic of Zionism and wrote several books on the subject. He was a founding member of the Revue des Études palestiniennes (Palestinian Studies Review; 1981–2008). Halevi lived in Paris, France, and the West Bank (his apartment in Ramallah was destroyed during Operation Rampart in 2002), and described himself as "100% Jewish and 100% Arab." His 2005 book Allers-retours has been called "a fictionalized autobiography", and was described in a review as "an immense and confusing collage populated by more than four hundred characters, some real, others inspired by real people, still others totally fictional (a table of characters specifies the fictional status of each one and recalls who he is in the story and possibly what his links are with other characters). With a bit of luck and if you are attentive, you will then hear, in the middle of this concert, a voice that will whisper to you both hot and cold, infinite belonging and exile, hope and doubt, laughter and tears, back and forth: it is there, the autobiographical truth. Finally, perhaps?"

In a 2011 interview, Halevi said: "My father fought against the Nazi occupation of France as a Communist. I follow in the tradition of my parents in the fight for freedom and justice, even for oppressed Jews. Given a second chance, I would live my life exactly the same way. In my 45 years as a member of the PLO, I have always been accepted as a Jew." In The Jerusalem Quarterly he was characterised as "a true revolutionary internationalist".

For his role in support of the Palestinian struggle, Halevi was awarded the Medal of Distinction by President Mahmoud Abbas.

== Death and legacy ==
Halevi died in Clichy, France, on 10 July 2013 at the age of 69. His funeral took place in Paris at the crematorium of Père Lachaise Cemetery.

Halevi's last book, Islamophobie et judéophobie. L'effet miroir, written in the final months of his life, was posthumously published in 2015, and in 2016, a collection of his essays and columns, entitled Du souvenir, du mensonge et de l'oubli: Chroniques palestiniennes, was produced in tribute to him by Actes Sud in collaboration with the Institute of Palestine Studies.

In April 2019, it was announced that through an initiative of President Abbas a new street in the city of Al-Bireh would be named in honour of Ilan Halevi, a decision described by Hanan Ashrawi as "a tribute to a person of courage and principle".

== Private life ==
Halevi was married four times, to Giliane Defort (divorced; one son, who died in 2002), Hava (a daughter and a son), Catherine Lévy (a daughter and a son), and Kirsten Maas (a son).

He was a jazz musician, who learned English from American musicians in France.

== Writings ==
=== Books ===
- Alain Albert, The Crossing (novel), New York: George Braziller, Inc., 1964; London: Heinemann, 1965. French translation by Georges Levin as La traversée, Paris: Éditions du Seuil, 1965.
- Sous Israël, la Palestine, Paris: Le Sycomore, 1978; Minerve, 1987.
- Israël, de la terreur au massacre d'Etat, Paris: Papyrus, 1984.
- Question juive: la tribu, la loi, l'espace, Paris: Editions de Minuit, 1981. Translated into English by A. M. Berrett as A History of the Jews: Ancient and Modern, London: Zed Books, 1987, ISBN 978-0862325329. Published in German as Auf der Suche nach dem gelobten Land: Die Geschichte der Juden und der Palästina-Konflikt, Hamburg: Junius, 1986. Reissued as Jewish Question: Tribe, Law and Space, Syllepse Editions, 2016.
- Face à la guerre. Lettre de Ramallah, Paris: Sindbad/Actes Sud, 2003, ISBN 978-2742745630.
- Allers-retours, Paris: Flammarion, 2005, ISBN 978-2082103398. A semi-autobiographical novel critical of Israel and its policies toward the Palestinians.
- Islamophobie et judéophobie. L'effet miroir, Paris: Éditions Syllepse, 2015. ISBN 9782849504635. Preface by Alain Gresh.
- Du souvenir, du mensonge et de l'oubli: Chroniques palestiniennes. Paris: Actes Sud, 2016. ISBN 978-2-330-07057-1.

=== Selected articles ===
- "Le droit du peuple palestinien à lutter contre l’occupation", Multitudes, 6, September 2001 (in French)
- "Encore une fois à propos du sionisme et de l'antisémitisme", voxnr.com, 10 June 2003. (in French)
- Articles by Ilan Halevi listed at Cairn.info
