= Derekh HaNitzotz =

Newspaper in Israel

- Type: Weekly newspaper
- Publisher: HaNitzotz–Al Sharara
- Ceased publication: February 1988
- Political alignment: Leftist
- Language: Hebrew
- Country: Israel
- Sister newspapers: Tariq Al Sharara

Derekh HaNitzotz (Hebrew: The Way of the Spark) was an Israeli weekly newspaper which was closed by the Israeli authorities in 1988. It was the first Hebrew-language newspaper banned in Israel.

== History and profile ==
Derekh HaNitzotz was started by the leftist figures who left the Matzpen movement. It was published by HaNitzotz–Al Sharara company on a weekly basis. The editors of the paper included Israeli Jews, and one of them was a Palestinian. The paper had an Arabic sister newspaper entitled Tariq Al Sharara. It had a leftist political leaning. Le Monde reported that the paper had a circulation of 800 copies and that its Arabic version had a circulation of 3,000 copies.

Derekh HaNitzotz specialized in investigative reports and news about the events in the Palestinian territories. Roni Ben-Efrat, a journalist for the paper, published an article in March 1987 about a pregnant Palestinian women, Naila Ayesh, who was arrested and tortured denying medical treatment. However, this news was not commonly featured in the Israeli media outlets except for now-defunct Hadashot.

The license of Derekh HaNitzotz was revoked by the Jerusalem District Commissioner in February 1988 due to its alleged connection with the Democratic Front for the Liberation of Palestine. Immediately after its closure several journalists working for Derekh HaNitzotz were arrested and tried. Felicia Langer, a lawyer and human rights activist, headed the legal team defending these journalists. Their trial ended in January 1989, and most of them were sentenced to imprisonment with varying periods. After their release from prison these people left Israel and settled in Germany.

The case of Derekh HaNitzotz was one of the actions which Israel carried against the internal opposition groups during the early period of the First Intifada.
