= Ehud Adiv =

Israeli political scientist and lecturer (born 1946)

- אהוד אדיב
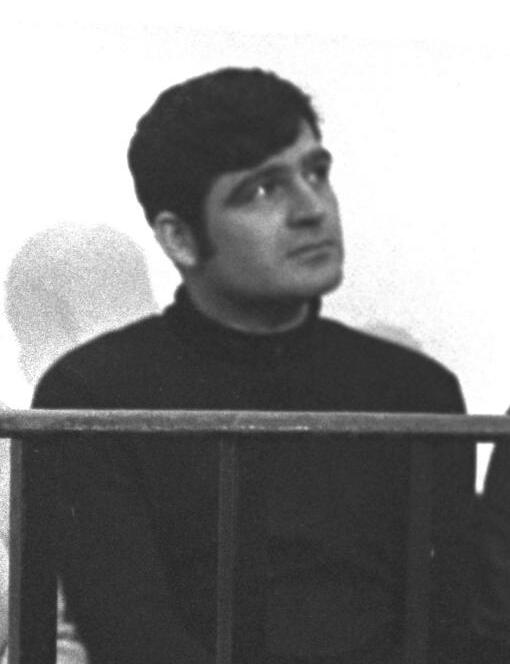
- Ehud Adiv in 1973
- Born: 21 June 1946 (age 80); Haifa, British Mandatory Palestine
- Other name: Udi
- Education: Tel Aviv University; University of Haifa
- Occupation: Lecturer
- Employer: Open University of Israel
- Criminal charges: Treason
- Criminal penalty: 12.5 years in prison
- Criminal status: Released

Ehud "Udi" Adiv (Hebrew: אהוד "אודי" אדיב; born June 21, 1946) is a Jewish political scientist. He was a lecturer at the Open University of Israel. In his youth, he was a left-wing anti-Zionist activist (a member of Ma'avak) who was eventually convicted of treason and membership in a hostile organization, serving over a decade in prison.

== Biography ==
Ehud "Udi" Adiv was born and raised in Kibbutz Gan Shmuel, one of four children born to Uriel (Uri) and Tova Adiv. Both of his parents were sabras, or native-born Jews in what was then British Mandatory Palestine, and his father was likewise born in Gan Shmuel to one of the founders of the kibbutz.

Adiv grew up in a left-wing political environment. He was conscripted into the Israel Defense Forces and served in the Paratroopers Brigade. He fought in the Six-Day War. He was among the soldiers who fought in the battle for Jerusalem. He became disillusioned and politically radicalized by his wartime experiences.

Following his discharge from active service, Adiv enrolled at Tel Aviv University and pursued undergraduate studies in philosophy and Middle Eastern studies. In the early 1970s, he became involved in militant anti-Zionist activities at conferences of the Israeli socialist organization Matzpen. Adiv was a member of the Matzpen offshoot Ma'avak and the Revolutionary Communist Alliance - Red Front, itself an offshoot of Ma'avak.

Adiv established contact with Syrian intelligence, and met Habib Kawahji, a former Israeli-Arab who had emigrated from Israel after serving prison time for anti-Israeli Arab nationalist activities, and who was believed to be working for Arab intelligence agencies, in Athens. Through him, he established contact with Syrian intelligence and was sent to Damascus, having been given a Syrian passport in the name of George Khoury. He was accused of having met with Syrian intelligence agents, and allegedly giving them information about Israeli society, military bases, and recruitment codes among other things, as well as allegedly undergoing sabotage training before travelling back to Israel. Other members of the Red Front, some recruited by Adiv himself, were also involved in the plot. The Israeli internal security service, Shin Bet, discovered this, and the cell's members, including Adiv, were arrested in December 1972.

In 1973, the members of the cell were tried, convicted, and given varying prison sentences. Adiv, who had refused to express remorse for his actions, was sentenced to 17 years in prison. At his request, he was placed in the same wing of his prison that Palestinian security prisoners were held in.

Adiv was mentioned by Yasser Arafat in his "Gun and the Olive Branch" speech before the United Nations General Assembly in 1974. In that speech, Arafat said: "As he stood in an Israeli military court, the Jewish revolutionary, Ehud Adiv, said: 'I am no terrorist; I believe that a democratic State should exist on this land.' Adiv now languishes in a Zionist prison among his co-believers. To him and his colleagues I send my heartfelt good wishes."

In 1975, while still imprisoned, Adiv married Sylvia Klingberg, the daughter of Marcus Klingberg, who would later be arrested and convicted for passing Israeli biological warfare secrets to the Soviet Union. The ceremony was held in Ayalon Prison. They divorced three years later. In 1981, he petitioned that he be allowed to marry Leah, who had been his girlfriend prior to his arrest, and that they be allowed conjugal visits to have a child, but his request was refused. His appeal to the president for an amnesty was also rejected.

In May 1985, after more than twelve years in prison, Adiv was released from prison under restrictive conditions as part of the Jibril Agreement. In August 1985, he married Leah. As they were too old to have a biological child, they requested permission to adopt a child. At first, welfare authorities refused their request, but later accepted it, subject to conditions.

Of his experience, Adiv said: "For me and for many young people, the 1967 war and its aftermath were a real shock. I woke up to the hypocrisy of the Mapam, its nationalism and refusal of any form of solidarity with the Palestinians. As a student I tried to make direct contact with the latter. And so, after a succession of secret meetings, I ended up, stupidly, in Damascus. Needless to say, I never gave the Syrians a scrap of information."

Following his release, Adiv turned to political science studies. Three years after his release, he completed a doctoral thesis entitled Politics and Identity: A Critical Analysis of Israeli Historiography and Political Thought at the University of London (under the supervision of Sami Zubaida) on Zionist historiography and particularly 1948 historiography. He was then appointed as a lecturer of political science in the Open University of Israel. He also was accepted as a teacher at the Arab-Palestinian Film School in Nazareth.

== Published works ==
- The Jewish Question and the Zionist Movement
- Adiv, Udi (1998). Politics and Identity: A Critical Analysis of Israeli Historiography and Political Thought. London: UP.

== Films ==
- B'Yom Bahir Ro'im et Damesek (1984; "On a Clear Day You Can See Damascus"), political thriller and debut film of director Eran Riklis
- Udi Adiv, A Broken Israeli Myth
