= Sylvain Cypel =

French journalist

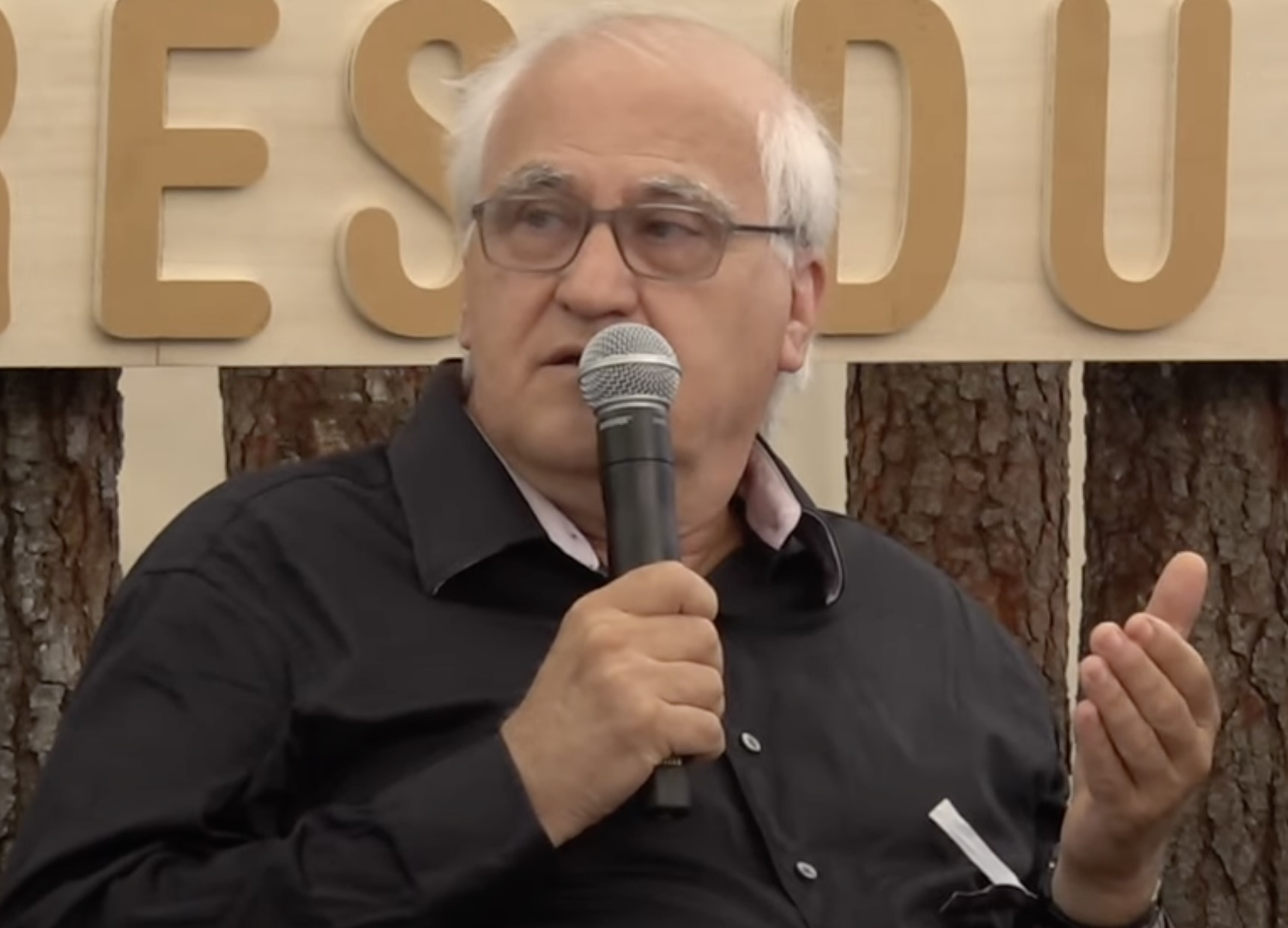
- Cypel in 2019
- Born: 1947 or 1948 (age 78–79)
- Occupation: Journalist
- Writing career
- Language: French

Sylvain Cypel (born 1947/1948) is a French journalist and pro-Palestinian activist.

== Life and career ==
Cypel was raised in Bordeaux and Paris. His father was Jacques Cypel (1911–2000), who had emigrated to France from his Ukrainian hometown of Volodymyr in the Volhynia region, and grew up in an atmosphere where there were three options or forms of redress, for Jewish communities plagued by anti-Semitic antagonisms: one could become a Bundist, or join the Communist Party, or identify with Jewish nationalism in the form of the Zionist movement, which itself fused two distinct currents – one advocating ethnic nationalism with a socialist orientation, and the other embodying the kind of chauvinistic ultranationalism typical of most Eastern European nationalisms. His father, who had opted for the former, Zionist socialism in 1926, fled to France in 1938, became a leader of the French Zionist movement and was for two decades the director of the world's last daily Yiddish newspaper, Unzer Wort (Our Word), until its closure in June 1996. He greeted Israel's victory in the Six-Day War in 1967 by telling his son that unless the Palestinian territories were restored to the Palestinian people, Israel would find itself in a colonial occupation that would prove fatal to Zionism.

From an early age, Cypel was a member of a French Labour Zionist youth group and, after graduating from high school, left France for Israel in 1969. He became a paratrooper in the IDF, joined the Trotskyite-oriented Workers Alliance – Avantgarde and studied at the Hebrew University of Jerusalem.

He was particularly struck by similarities he observed between Israeli Jewish attitudes to Palestinians and the prejudices repatriated French settlers entertained about Arabs. Overall, he spent 12 years in Israel, an experience which turned him into an Anti-Zionist. (Note: "I had always thought that when Israel was founded as a refuge for the persecuted Jews of the world, justice had been on the Israeli side…. But I was gradually discovering that the expulsion of the Palestinians and the seizing of their land had been deliberately brutal." (Shulman 2022)) He dates his own sense that Zionism had betrayed itself with apartheid to an interview he held with the Israeli Attorney-General Michael Ben-Yair in the early 2000s.

Both he and his wife were ostracized and lost jobs as a result of their views. In 1998 he left the Courrier International magazine where he had worked for five years as editor-in-chief, and joined Le Monde as deputy head of the international section. He was then Le Monde's New York correspondent until 2013. He is also a corresponding member of Alain Gresh's online magazine Orient XXI.

== Views ==
Cypel has published two books on the question of the Israeli-Palestinian conflict. He began writing the second on 14 May 2018, after observing that the Trump administration's relocation of its embassy to Jerusalem was celebrated in the global press while, on the same day, the fact that Israeli troops kept conducting from a safe distance mass shootings of protesting Gazans, was ignored, evidence, in Cypel's view, of the extraordinary ideological influence Israel has managed to exercise over world opinion. In the book he argues that Israel practices apartheid, and is highly critical of the silence that he claims has fallen over the question of Palestinian human rights, namely Israel's "ability to deny basic rights to an entire people." While he allows that many other countries have resorted to similar practices, he finds Zionism's version distinctive for three reasons:

It's true that the occupation has never reached the levels of terror inflicted upon Syria and Yemen, but three factors make it particularly oppressive: its initial basis (expelling people from their land by force); its long duration (seventy-plus years since that expulsion, fifty years of military occupation over most of those people); and finally, its modalities (the slow, but steady confiscation of land, the seizure of resources, the occupying authorities' deliberate policy of making Palestinians daily lives unbearable in hopes of making them eventually leave).

He attributes the silence to the ideological success with which Israel has, by "blindfolding" Western support for what Cypel considers to be an ethnonationalist segregationist state, managed to deflect critiques of its practices by associating such criticisms with anti-Semitism.

Never has Israel's ideological influence appeared so evident: from its impact on the "war on terrorism", which is of paramount importance and which Jean-Pierre Filiu has ably shed light on in a recent book, to this capacity to silence any criticism by the threat of having oneself immediately taxed with accusations of anti-Semitism. This diplomatic influence is expressed symbolically by the Israeli capacity to have adopted in important international circles a new definition of anti-Semitism, in which criticism of Zionism and Israel are included. (Note: "Jamais l'influence idéologique d'Israël n'est apparue aussie manifeste: de son impact sur la <<guerre au terrorisme>>, d'une importance primordiale et que Jean-Pierre Filiu a fort bien éclairé dans un récent ouvrage, jusqu'à cette capacité à faire taire toute critique par la menace de se voir aussitôt taxé d'antisémite, cette influence diplomatique se manifeste symboliquement par la capacité israélienne à fair adopter dans d'importants cénacles internationaux une nouvelle définition de l'antisémitisme qui y inclut la critique du sionisme et d'Israël." (Cypel 2020))

Cypel speaks of the growing disenchantment of American Jews with developments in Israel, instancing as an example the Talmudic scholar Daniel Boyarin's remark in 2006, once thought to border on blasphemy:

Most piercing to me is the pain of watching a tradition, my Judaism, to which I have dedicated my life, disintegrating before my eyes. It has been said by many Christians that Christianity died at Auschwitz, Treblinka, and Sobibor. I fear-God forbid – that my Judaism may be dying at Nablus, Dheisheh, Betein' or Khalil.

== Sources ==
- Cypel, Sylvain (2006). Walled: Israeli Society at an Impasse. Other Press. ISBN 978-1-590-51210-4.
- Cypel, Sylvain (2020). L'Etat d'Israël contre les Juifs (in French). La Découverte. ISBN 978-2-348-04344-4.
- Cypel, Sylvain (2021). The State of Israel vs. the Jews. Translated by William Rodarmor. Other Press. ISBN 978-1-635-42098-2.
- Gold, Joshua (25 January 2022). "Cypel's 'Israel vs the Jews' is essential reading– but once again, Palestinians are extras in their own story". Mondoweiss.
- Herbst, Robert (10 January 2022). "'The State of Israel vs the Jews' — important new book chronicles Israel's spiritual demise". Mondoweiss.
- Kaiser, Charles (19 December 2021). "The State of Israel vs The Jews review: fierce indictment of a rightward lurch". The Guardian.
- Shulman, David (12 February 2022). "Lost Illusions: Sylvain Cypel's transformation from liberal Zionist to ferocious critic of Israel". The New York Review of Books.
- "Sylvain Cypel: Ses publications". Le Monde (in French).
- Weiss, Philip (11 February 2022). "'I am exhausted by Israel' — hear Sylvain Cypel on the risk to Jews of supporting the 'thug nation'". Mondoweiss.
