= Israel Shahak bibliography =

The following is a list of works by Israel Shahak.

== Books ==
- Israel Shahak, (ed.), The Non-Jew in the Jewish State; a collection of Documents, Jerusalem, 1975
- Israel Shahak (ed), Begin & Co as they really are, Glasgow 1977
- Israel Shahak and Noam Chomsky, Israel's Global Role: Weapons for Repression (Studies in Geophysical Optics and Remote Sensing), Association of Arab-American University Graduates, Inc., April 1982, paperback, ISBN 0-937694-51-7
- Israel Shahak, Israel's Global Role : Weapons for Repression (Special Reports, No. 4), Association of Arab-American University Graduates, 1982, paperback
- Israel Shahak, Jewish History, Jewish Religion: The Weight of Three Thousand Years: Pluto Press, London, 1994, ISBN 978-0-7453-0819-7; Pluto Press, London, 2008, ISBN 978-0-7453-2840-9
- Israel Shahak, Open Secrets: Israeli Foreign and Nuclear Policies, Pluto Press, London, 1997
- Israel Shahak and Norton Mezvinsky, Jewish Fundamentalism in Israel (Pluto Middle Eastern Series), Pluto Press (UK), October, 1999, hardcover, 176 pages, ISBN 0-7453-1281-0; trade paperback, Pluto Press, (UK), October, 1999, ISBN 0-7453-1276-4; 2nd edition with new introduction by Norton Mezvinsky, trade paperback July, 2004, 224 pages

== Articles ==
- What Are My Opinions? March - April 1975 The Link - Volume 8, Issue 2
- The Racist nature of Zionism and of the Zionistic State of Israel The Link, volume 8, issue 5 Winter 1975
- The `Historical Right' and the Other Holocaust, in Journal of Palestine Studies, 10, no. 3 (Spr. 1981): 27-34
- The Zionist Plan for the Middle East (a translation of Oded Yinon’s “A Strategy for Israel in the Nineteen Eighties” or the "Yinon Plan" , Association of Arab-American University Graduates, Inc., October 1982, paperback, ISBN 0-937694-56-8
- Israeli Apartheid and the Intifada, in Race and Class, 1988: Volume 30, no. 1: 1-13.
- AFL-CIO Pension Funds Invested In Faltering Israeli Institutions December 1988, Page 17 WRMEA.
- A History of the Concept of `Transfer' in Zionism, in Journal of Palestine Studies, 18, no. 3 (Spr. 1989): 22-37.
- Human Rights in the Occupied Territories: Comparing the Hebrew and US Press Extra! Summer 1989
- Shamir's Manipulation of American Jewish Groups: A Disaster For All January 1991, Page 6 WRMEA
- Soviet Immigration Deprives Israelis of Housing and Arabs of Jobs January 1991, Page 27 WRMEA
- Journalists Link Israeli Financial Woes to Shamir-Bush Confrontation January 1991, Page 67 WRMEA
- Letter from Jerusalem Lies of Our Times, February 1991, p. 8.
- The Israeli Occupation Three Years After the Intifada March 1991, Page 27 WRMEA
- Israel Will Withdraw Only Under Pressure July 1991, Page 20 WRMEA
- Internal Criticism of Racism Would Be Called "Anti-Semitic" Outside Israel August/September 1991, Page 23 WRMEA
- Israel Uses Increased US Aid to Prepare 1992 Attack on Syria October 1991, Page 19 WRMEA
- Why Israel Can Never Repay the Loans to be Guaranteed by the US November 1991, Page 17 WRMEA
- America "No Longer Under Our Rule": Israelis Discuss Collapse of US Lobby December/January 1991/92, Page 11, WRMEA
- The Occupied Territories' True Ruler: Israel's Corrupt and Inefficient Shabak February 1993, Page 28, WRMEA
- With Iraq Neutralized, Israelis Seek Catalyst for War With Iran April/May 1993, Page 15 WRMEA
- Can Religious Settlers Scuttle an Israeli-Palestinian Peace? By July/August 1993, Page 11
- Oslo Agreement Makes PLO Israel's Enforcer November/December 1993, Page 7-16 WRMEA
- Israeli Cultivation of Cuba Reflects Contempt for U.S. Policies January 1994, Page 18 WRMEA
- Israel's State-Assisted Terrorism: "Settlers" as Armed Combatants February/March 1994, Page 16 WRMEA
- Poverty, Religious Instruction Breed Xenophobia in Israel July/August 1994, Page 19 WRMEA
- Settling the West Bank and Israeli Domestic Politics April/May 1995, Pages 15, 108-110 WRMEA
- Downturn in Rabin's Popularity Has Several Causes March 1995, pgs. 11, 97-98 WRMEA
- Israel's Discriminatory Practices Are Rooted in Jewish Religious Law July/August 1995, pgs. 18, 119 WRMEA
- What Will Likud Do When It Comes to Power in Israel? December 1995, Pages 18, 82 WRMEA
- Rabin's Murder Spotlights Religious Influence in Israeli Police and Army January 1996, pgs. 8, 97-98 WRMEA
- The Real Israeli Interests in Lebanon, in WRMEA, July 1996, pgs. 19, 11
- Prime Minister Binyamin Netanyahu November/December 1996, pages 19, 106 WRMEA
- A Practical Look at Settlements From the Israeli Point of View March 1998, Pages 8, 86 WRMEA
- Israel Shahak Articles, list of articles and interviews with Shahak in Middle East Policy Journal
- Israel Shahak comments & articles in The New York Review of Books

== Interviews ==
- An Interview with Israel Shahak, interview in Journal of Palestine Studies, 4, no. 3 (Spr. 1975): 3-20.
- No Change in Zion, interview in Journal of Palestine Studies, 7, no. 3 (Spr. 1978): 3-16.
