= Mezvinsky =

Mezvinsky is a surname found in the United States. Notable people with this surname include:

- Edward Mezvinsky (born 1937), American politician and convicted felon
- Marc Mezvinsky (born 1977), American investment banker and husband of Chelsea Clinton
- Marjorie Margolies-Mezvinsky (born 1942), American journalist and politician
- Norton Mezvinsky (1932 – 2022), American professor
