= LaBrie =

LaBrie is a surname. Notable people with the surname include:

- Brennan LaBrie (born 1999), American journalist
- Carol LaBrie (1946–2021), American model
- James LaBrie (born 1963), Canadian singer
- Steven LaBrie (born 1988), American baritone
