= Khalid Latif =

Khalid Latif may refer to:

- Khalid Latif (imam), imam of the New York University Islamic Center and the New York City Police Department
- Khalid Latif (cricketer) (born 1985), Pakistani cricketer
- K. L. Gauba, also known as Khalid Latif Gauba (1889-1981), lawyer, author, politician
