= Pam Potillo =

American actress

- Born: Pamela Potillo; Trenton, New Jersey, U.S.
- Occupations: Actress and voice-over artist
- Years active: 1984–1990

Pamela Potillo is an American actress who was best known as Janet on The Cosby Show (1985–1990).

== Life and career ==
Pamela Potillo was born in Trenton, New Jersey. Raised in New Jersey, Potillo began her career as one of the hosts on the weekend morning kids' news magazine Wonderama, which ran on WNEW-TV. Her role on the show was produced from 1980 to 1987.

In 1984, Potillo made her Broadway debut as Georgia Jones in Shirley Lauro's Open Admissions. She is also known for her recurring role on The Cosby Show as Vanessa Huxtable's friend Janet Meiser from 1985 to 1990. Potillo also appeared with Ben Affleck and Madeline Kahn in an episode of the ABC Afterschool Special.

She received her B.A. from Rutgers University and an M.A. from Pepperdine University.

== Filmography ==
Title	Character	Film/TV series	Notes
1980–1987	Wonderama	Herself/co-host	Morning kids' show appearances
1984	A Doctor's Story (TV movie)	Carla	first acting role
1984–1985	ABC Weekend Special	Leslie Thorton/Lizbeth Collins	in 2 episode specials, "A Different Twist" and "Columbus Circle"
1995	And the Children Shall Lead	Rachel Henderson	TV movie
1986	My Little Girl	Georgia	First film role
1987	Spenser: For Hire	Jessie Braxton	Episode: "One for My Daughter"
1987–88	Charles in Charge	Lisa Taylor / 'Baby Doll'	3 episodes
1986–1990	ABC Afterschool Special	Kate / Melanie	2 episodes
1985–1990	The Cosby Show	Janet Meiser	10 episodes
