= American Jewish Alternatives to Zionism =

American Jewish anti-Zionist organisation

- Founded: 1968; 58 years ago
- Type: Nonprofit
- Headquarters: New York City, NY, U.S.

American Jewish Alternatives to Zionism (AJAZ) was a Jewish anti-Zionist organization which was founded by the Reform Rabbi Elmer Berger.

== History ==
AJAZ was founded by the Reform Rabbi Elmer Berger in 1968. Berger served as the president and chief spokesperson of AJAZ until his death in 1996. Berger created AJAZ as an anti-Zionist successor to the American Council for Judaism (ACJ), a Classical Reform organization with a history of anti-Zionism. AJAZ had a small membership, mostly composed of supporters of the ACJ. The Near Eastern and Jewish studies scholar Jonathan Marc Gribetz has characterized AJAZ as a "one-man organization" led by Berger.

Historical records from AJAZ are held in the collections of the American Jewish Historical Society in Manhattan.

== See also ==
- List of Jewish anti-Zionist organizations
