= Israel Shahak =

Israeli professor, Holocaust survivor, and civil-rights activist (1933–2001)

- ישראל שחק
- Shahak in 1980s
- Born: Israel Himmelstaub; April 29, 1933; Warsaw, Poland
- Died: July 2, 2001 (aged 68); Jerusalem, Israel
- Education: Hebrew University of Jerusalem (PhD); Stanford University
- Occupations: Professor of chemistry, political scientist, civil rights activist, author

Israel Shahak (Hebrew: ישראל שחק; born Israel Himmelstaub, 28 April 1933 – 2 July 2001) was a Polish-born Israeli organic chemist, public intellectual, and civil rights activist. Shahak, a Holocaust survivor whose family immigrated to Israel after World War II, spent much of his academic career as a professor of organic chemistry at the Hebrew University of Jerusalem. As an advocate for the civil rights of Jews and non-Jews in Israel, he headed the Israeli League for Human and Civil Rights from 1970 to 1990 and was a frequent critic of Israeli government policies. Shahak was an outspoken liberal and secularist; his writings on Judaism, especially the book Jewish History, Jewish Religion: The Weight of Three Thousand Years (1994) proved controversial.

== Biography ==
Israel Shahak was born Israel Himmelstaub, in 1933, in Warsaw, Poland, and was the youngest child of a cultured, Zionist family of Ashkenazi Jews. During the Second World War, the Nazi occupation of Poland (1939–1945) interned the Shahak family to the Warsaw Ghetto; yet his elder brother escaped from Poland to the United Kingdom, where he joined the Royal Air Force. Life in occupied Poland forced Shahak's mother to pay a Roman Catholic family to hide Israel, whom they returned when she could not afford their safe-keeping him from the Nazis.

In 1943, the Nazis sent the Shahak family to the Poniatowa concentration camp, to the west of Lublin, where his father died. Fortunately, the ten-year-old boy and his mother escaped from the Poniatowa camp, and returned to Warsaw; yet, within a year, whilst emptying the city of Jews, the Nazis recaptured Israel and his mother, and imprisoned them in the Bergen-Belsen concentration camp, where they survived for 2 years, until the camp and its inmates were liberated in 1945 by the British Army. At age 13, in 1946, he re-examined the idea of God's existence and concluded that evidence for the theory was lacking. As displaced persons, mother and son managed to emigrate to the British Mandate of Palestine, where Shahak's application to join a kibbutz was denied, because he was judged to be physically too slender.

Post-war, the twelve-year-old Israel worked and studied and supported his mother, whose health had deteriorated in Bergen-Belsen. After a religious Jewish education at boarding school in the village of Kfar Hassidim, Israel and his mother moved to the city of Tel Aviv. Upon graduation from secondary school, Shahak served in the Israel Defense Forces (IDF). After the military service, he earned a doctorate in chemistry, at Hebrew University.

In the course of his professional career as a scientist, Shahak's work in organic chemistry produced science about organic compounds of the element fluorine (F), contributed to cancer research, for which he gained an international reputation and included posting as an assistant to Ernst David Bergmann, the nuclear physicist who was chairman (1952) of the Israel Atomic Energy Commission (IAEC). In 1961, Shahak pursued post-doctoral studies at Stanford University, in the U.S.; in 1963, he returned to Israel, where he became a popular lecturer and researcher in chemistry, at Hebrew University; moreover, by 1965, Shahak actively participated in the Israeli politics of the day.

In 1990, the academic Shahak retired from the faculty of Hebrew University, because of poor health (diabetes mellitus) and greater interest in research work in other fields of intellectual enquiry. For most of his adult life, Shahak resided in the Rehavia neighborhood in West Jerusalem; at the age of 68 years, he died of diabetic complications, and was buried in the Givat Shaul cemetery.

Shahak had a deep affinity with Spinoza: he always packed a copy of The Ethics in his suitcase for reading during his periodic stints of service in the Israel Defense Forces, and had been writing a book on the philosopher before his death. His activities as a public intellectual fighting for human rights causes and for a secular state earned him a reputation for controversy, and frequent abuse. He was regularly spat on, frequently given death threats, and decried variously as an Israel basher, self-hating Jew, traitor, and enemy of the people.

== Politics ==
=== Public intellectual ===
In the late 1950s, as a citizen of Israel, Shahak became politically engaged on hearing a comment of David Ben-Gurion that, with the Suez War (29 October 1956 – 7 November 1956), the State of Israel was fighting to achieve "the kingdom of David and Solomon". In the 1960s he joined the Israeli League Against Religious Coercion. In 1965, he began political activism against "Classical Judaism" and Zionism; and wrote a letter to Haaretz about having witnessed an Orthodox Jew "refusing to let his phone be used on the Sabbath to help a non-Jew who had collapsed nearby"; in Israel, Shahak's complaint began a long-running debate about the attitudes (religious and cultural) of Orthodox Judaism towards gentiles.

In 1967, after the Six-Day War (5–10 June 1967), Shahak ended his membership to the League Against Religious Coercion, because they were "fake liberals" who used the principles of Liberalism to combat coercive religious influence in Israeli society — but did not apply such protections to the Israeli Palestinians living in the IDF-occupied West Bank and in the Gaza Strip. In the event, Shahak joined the Israeli League for Human and Civil Rights, and became its president in 1970. The League, composed of Jewish and Arab citizens of Israel, protested and publicized Israel's restrictive policies against Palestinians and provided legal aid to them. Some settlers in the West Bank city of Hebron so hated him that in 1971 they had their pick-up truck painted with "Dr. Shahak To The Gallows".

In 1969, Shahak and another member of the faculty of Hebrew University staged a sit-down protest against the Israeli government's policy of jailing politically active Palestinian students, by way of administrative detention authorised by state-of-emergency laws; likewise, Shahak supported the political efforts of Palestinian students to achieve equal rights, like those granted to Jewish Israelis, at Hebrew University. In 1970, Shahak established the Committee Against Administrative Detentions to formally oppose such legalised political repression.

To make public what he considered the anti-Arab and anti-Palestinian legalised discrimination, Shahak published English translations of Hebrew-language reportage about illegal and unjust actions of the Israeli government against the gentile citizens of Israel; Shahak's English reports were intended for the Jewish community of the U.S. The translated reports featured headlines such as "Torture in Israel," and "Collective Punishment in the West Bank", which Shahak sent to journalists, academics, and human rights activists, and so ensured that the mainstream population of the U.S. would be informed of the religious discrimination practised by the government of Israel.

=== Civil rights advocate ===
As a public intellectual, Shahak wrote about the Israeli government's actions against the non-Jewish citizens of the State of Israel, such as the suppression of freedom of speech and general political activity; land ordinances, living restrictions, and the confiscation of lands from non-Jews; the destruction of houses; legally-sanctioned unequal pay and work restrictions; emergency-defence regulations allowing the summary arrest, detention, and torture of prisoners (civil and military); the collective punishment of communities; the assassinations of leaders (religious, political, academic); racial discrimination in access to education; and the deprivation of Israeli citizenship. Such political activities earned Shahak much hostility and death threats; after the 1982 Lebanon War (June 1982 – June 1985), Shahak also reported Israeli abuses of the populations of Lebanon.

In effort to explain the behaviour of the State of Israel towards their Arab neighbours, Shahak proposed that the Israeli interpretation of Jewish history produced a society who disregard the human rights of the Arab peoples, within Israel and around Israel. That Zionism was a "régime based on structural discrimination and racism".

In the book review of a festschrift in honour of Rabbi Elmer Berger Anti-Zionism: Analytical Reflections (1988), Sheldon Richman characterized Shahak's interpretation of Zionism as viewing it as an atavistic reaction against the European Enlightenment's individualism that strove to revive the suffocating world of the Jewish ghetto. The founders of the movement did not believe Jews could lead a normal existence in democratic societies. In this sense, for Shahak, Zionism can be thought of as "a mirror image of anti-Semitism," in that, in common with antisemites, Zionists considered Jews to be aliens who must be quarantined from the rest of the world, a viewpoint Shahak read as capitulating to European antisemitism. For Richman, Shahak's analysis shed light on the tragic consequences that followed upon the establishment of Israel, as Arabs were swept away to forge a state for Jews alone.

In letters published in the Ha'aretz and Kol Ha'ir newspapers, Shahak criticized the political hypocrisy demonstrated by the radical Left in their uncritical support of the Palestinian nationalist movements. In his obituary of Shahak, Christopher Hitchens said that Shahak's house was "a library of information about the human rights of the oppressed", and that: (Note: Hitchens acknowledged a personal debt to Shahak, one of several people who "had to undergo considerable intellectual trial and evince notable courage, in order to break with the faith of their tribes", for having introduced him to the thinking of Spinoza.)

The families of prisoners, the staff of closed and censored publications, the victims of eviction and confiscation — none were ever turned away. I have met influential "civil society" Palestinians alive today who were protected as students when Israel was a professor of chemistry at the Hebrew University; from him they learned never to generalize about Jews. And they respected him, not just for his consistent stand against discrimination, but also because — he never condescended to them. He detested nationalism and religion, and made no secret of his contempt for the grasping Arafat entourage. But, as he once put it to me, "I will now only meet with Palestinian spokesmen when we are out of the country. I have some severe criticisms to present to them. But I cannot do this while they are living under occupation, and I can 'visit' them as a privileged citizen."

Shahak was also active in protesting the public burning of Christian books such as occurred on 23 March 1980 when Yad Le-akhim, a religious organization that was at the time a beneficiary of subsidies from the Ministry of Religion, ceremonially incinerated hundreds of copies of the New Testament publicly in Jerusalem.

=== Author ===
Among the books written by Israel Shahak were Jewish Fundamentalism in Israel (1994), co-authored by Norton Mezvinsky, Jewish History, Jewish Religion: The Weight of Three Thousand Years (1994, see below), and Open Secrets: Israel's Nuclear and Foreign Policies (1997). In the introduction to the 2004 edition of Jewish Fundamentalism in Israel, the historian Mezvinsky said, "We realize that, by criticizing Jewish fundamentalism, we are criticizing a part of the past that we love. We wish that members of every human grouping would criticize their own past, even before criticizing others."

== Alleged telephone incident ==
In 1965, Shahak wrote a letter to the Haaretz newspaper, about an injustice he witnessed; that letter originated "the current major debate within and outside Israel about Orthodox Jewish attitudes to non-Jews." In the letter, Shahak said he witnessed an Orthodox Jew refuse the use of his telephone to call for an ambulance for a non-Jew, because it was the Shabbat. Shahak added that the Beth din, the rabbinical court of Jerusalem, had confirmed that the Orthodox Jew correctly understood Halakha law on Pikuach nefesh regarding non-Jews and the Sabbath, and quoted passages from a recent legal compilation.

Consequently, the cultural matter of a religiously-denied telephone became public political discussion in the Israeli press and the Jewish press abroad, all of which directed attention to Shahak as a public intellectual in the cultural politics of Israel. The Jewish Chronicle in London stated that "The halakha (Jewish law) abounds in such abominations ... in conflict with the humane instincts within which anyone raised in Jewish tradition is imbued." In the Maariv newspaper, the minister of religious affairs, Rabbi Dr. Zerach Warhaftig said that the Orthodox rabbinical ruling was correct, but quoted traditional Jewish passages that allowed a Jewish physician to save the life of a non-Jew on the Sabbath, despite not being religiously required to do so.

=== Public controversy ===
In 1966, Rabbi Immanuel Jakobovits disputed the veracity of Shahak's story, claiming that Israel Shahak had been compelled to admit that the incident had not occurred. He cited a lengthy responsum, by Isser Yehuda Unterman, the Ashkenazi Chief Rabbi of Israel, who said that "the Sabbath must be violated to save non-Jewish life no less than Jewish lives", and cited a ruling by Rabbi Menachem Meiri that Jews should desecrate the Sabbath to save a gentile's life. The opinions of these rabbis derived from the book Noda B'Yehuda (Known in Judah), in which the 18th-century religious authority Yechezkel Landau said: "I emphatically declare that in all laws contained in the Jewish writings concerning theft, fraud, etc. no distinction is made between Jew and Gentile; that the (Talmudic) legal categories goy, akum (idolater) etc., in no way apply to the people among whom we live."

Despite the controversy, Shahak published his account of the telephone in the first chapter of Jewish History, Jewish Religion (1994), and said that "neither the Israeli, nor the diaspora rabbinical authorities ever reversed their ruling that a Jew should not violate the Sabbath in order to save the life of a Gentile. They added much sanctimonious twaddle to the effect that, if the consequence of such an act puts Jews in danger, the violation of the Sabbath is permitted, for their sake."

== Jewish History, Jewish Religion ==
In 1994, Shahak published Jewish History, Jewish Religion: The Weight of Three Thousand Years, about Jewish fundamentalism, which history professor Norton Mezvinsky, at Central Connecticut State University, said is a:

Scathing attack upon Classical Judaism and its more modern outgrowth, Orthodox Judaism.... As a lover of prophetic Judaism and as a disciple of Spinoza, Shahak, in a learned and rational manner, condemned the parochialism, racism, and hatred of non-Jews, which too often appeared in the Judaism that developed during and after the Talmudic period, and which, to a goodly extent, still exists.

That the initial history of most nations is ethnocentric, and that, in time, by way of a period of critical self-analysis, the nation incorporates the social perspectives of the Other, of the ethnic groups living among them. That, after the Age of Enlightenment, the Jewish emancipation from legal and religious social subordination was a dual liberation — from Christian antisemitism and from the rabbinate of conservative Judaism, and their "imposed scriptural control" upon daily Jewish life.

The journalist Robert Fisk said that the examination of Jewish fundamentalism is invaluable, because Shahak concludes that:

There can no longer be any doubt that the most horrifying acts of oppression in the West Bank are motivated by Jewish religious fanaticism." He quotes from an official exhortation to religious Jewish soldiers about Gentiles, published by the Israeli army's Central Region Command, in which the chief chaplain writes: "When our forces come across civilians during a war, or in hot pursuit, or a raid, so long as there is no certainty that those civilians are incapable of harming our forces, then, according to the Halakhah (the legal system of Classical Judaism) they may and even should be killed... In no circumstances should an Arab be trusted, even if he makes an impression of being civilised.... In war, when our forces storm the enemy, they are allowed, and even enjoined, by the Halakhah to kill even good civilians, that is, civilians who are ostensibly good.

In his foreword to the second edition (1997), Edward Said said that Shahak was "one of the most remarkable individuals in the contemporary Middle East" who he credits with doing more to dissipate the "ideological smoke screen" of Zionism than any other single individual. He goes on to describe Shahak as "un- and anti-racist" and emphasizes Shahak's consistency in applying a single standard for infractions against human rights. Said describes Shahak's writing as "rigorous and uncompromising", often at the expense of putting things "'nicely'".

Said comments specifically about Jewish History, Jewish Religion as a powerful contribution to the study of Judaism and rabbinical and Talmudic traditions and its associated scholarship. In summary, he describes this work:

Shahak shows that the obscure, narrowly chauvinist prescriptions against various undesirable Others are to be found in Judaism (as well of course as other monotheistic traditions) but he also then goes on to show the continuity between those and the way Israel treats Palestinians, Christians and other non-Jews. A devastating portrait of prejudice, hypocrisy and religious intolerance emerges.

About his other writing, Said also emphasized Shahak's willingness to criticize Palestinian policies, addressing "the PLO's sloppiness, its ignorance of Israel, its inability to resolutely oppose Israel, its shabby compromises and cult of personality, its general lack of seriousness."

In his book review, Werner Cohn said that Shahak was making "grotesque charges" and that specific passages in Jewish History, Jewish Religion are without foundation:

Some are just funny. He says (pp. 23-4) that "Jewish children are actually taught" to utter a ritual curse when passing a non-Jewish cemetery. (Note: "So now, one can read quite freely—and Jewish children are actually taught—passages such as that, which commands every Jew, whenever passing near a cemetery, to utter a blessing if the cemetery is Jewish, but to curse the mothers of the dead if it is non-Jewish.") He also tells us (p. 34) that "both before and after a meal, a pious Jew ritually washes his hands....On one of these two occasions he is worshiping God... but on the other he is worshiping Satan..." I did take the trouble to question my orthodox rabbi nephew to find what might be behind such tall tales. He had no clue. If orthodox Jews were actually taught such hateful things, surely someone would have heard. Whom is Dr. Shahak kidding?. (Note: "Other prayers or religious acts, as interpreted by the Cabbalists, are designed to deceive various angels (imagined as minor deities with a measure of independence) or to propitiate Satan... both before and after a meal, a pious Jew ritually washes his hands, uttering a special blessing. On one of these two occasions he is worshiping God, by promoting the divine union of Son and Daughter; but on the other he is worshiping Satan, who likes Jewish prayers and ritual acts so much that, when he is offered a few of them, it keeps him busy for a while, and he forgets to pester the divine Daughter.")

The remark regarding children passing a cemetery occurs in Shahak's discussion of passages modified by rabbis who, under pressure from antisemitic Christian authorities such as those in Tzarist Russia, altered the texts, while keeping private copies of the originals which, according to Shahak were restored as the proper manuscript readings and published in Israel after the founding of the state of Israel.

Samuel Heilman, writing for the Review of Middle East Studies, gave a negative review and proposed to dispose the book "into the same dustbin as the infamous anti-Jewish tract and fraud, the Protocols of the Elders of Zion."

== Critical reception ==
As a public intellectual, Israel Shahak was accused of fabricating the incidents he reported, of blaming the victim, of distorting the normative meaning of Jewish religious texts, and of misrepresenting Jewish belief and law. Paul Bogdanor claimed that Shahak "regaled his audience with a stream of outrageous libels, ludicrous fabrications, and transparent hoaxes. As each successive allegation was exposed and discredited, he would simply proceed to a new invention." Ari Alexander, co-founder of the Children of Abraham Organization for Jewish–Islamic dialogue, said that, despite the use of Shahak's works by neo-Nazis and anti-Israel organisations in Arab countries:

The texts that Shahak cites are real (though Shahak's sporadic use of footnotes makes it difficult to check all of them). Often, the interpretation [by Shahak] of these texts is debatable, and their prominence in Judaism negligible, but, nonetheless, they are part of Jewish tradition, and, therefore, cannot be ignored.

Accusations of being an antisemite were among the responses to Shahak's works about Judaism and the Talmud. In that vein, in The Talmud in Anti-Semitic Polemics, the Anti-Defamation League (ADL) listed Shahak as one of four authors of antisemitic polemics, and Bogdanor said that in his works, Shahak was "recycling Soviet anti-Semitic propaganda". Werner Cohn said, "without question, he is the world's most conspicuous Jewish anti-Semite.... Like the Nazis before him, Shahak specialized in defaming the Talmud. In fact, he has made it his life's work to popularize the anti–Talmud ruminations of the eighteenth-century German anti-Semite, Johann Eisenmenger". Emanuele Ottolenghi, reviewing Alexander and Bogdanor's book, argued that Jews such as Shahak, George Steiner, Tanya Reinhart, Tony Judt, Avi Shlaim, Seymour Hersh and Daniel Boyarin act as enablers for antisemites, because the rhetoric of antisemitic Jews plays a "crucial role... in excusing, condoning, and — in effect — abetting anti-Semitism." In his opinion, "Anti-Semites rely on Jews to confirm their prejudice: If Jews recur to such language, and advocate such policies, how can anyone be accused of anti-Semitism, for making the same arguments?... The mechanism through which an anti-Semitic accusation becomes respectable once a Jew endorses it is not limited to Israel's new historians.... Israel Shahak made the comparison between Israel and Nazism respectable — all the while describing Judaism according to the medieval canons of the blood libel".

The journalist Dan Rickman argues that

Shahak ignores [the dialectical nature and humanist] aspects of the sources. Further, through overstating his case, his analysis fits into anti-Semitic traditions of such accusations against the Talmud. Copies of the Talmud have been burned, and the text of the Talmud that is studied today is still heavily censored. Shahak's view that chauvinism in these sources in any way 'justifies' anti-Semitism is also very troubling. However, I do believe that his trenchant critique of Judaism is, tragically, not without some force. The contemporary situation is that we do see some modern Orthodox rabbis utilise xenophobic sources in modern rulings. Orthodox rabbis in organisations such as Rabbis for Human Rights are sadly the exception rather than the rule.

== Death ==
Shahak died of diabetes in July 2001 and was buried in Giv'at Shaul cemetery, Jerusalem. His death was the occasion of tribute and criticism; the Bar-Ilan University historian Haim Genizi, said that "Shahak's extreme anti-Israeli statements were welcomed by the PLO, and [were] widely circulated in pro–Arab circles", in detriment to the interests of the State of Israel. Gore Vidal said Shahak was "the latest, if not the last, of the great prophets", regarding the influence of religion upon the civil law of society. Norton Mezvinsky, said that his friend and collaborator was "a rare intellectual giant and a superior humanist"; in that vein, Edward Said said that Shahak was "a very brave man who should be honored for his services to humanity." An obituary in Haaretz called him "the scourge of nationalists".

Christopher Hitchens considered Shahak a "dear friend and comrade... [who was] a brilliant and devoted student of the archaeology of Jerusalem and Palestine", who, "during his chairmanship of the Israeli League for Human and Civil Rights, set a personal example that would be very difficult to emulate." Alexander Cockburn, writing in Antiwar.com, described Shahak the intellectual, the "tireless translator and erudite foot-noter... a singular man, an original." Allan C. Brownfeld, of the American Council for Judaism, recalled a humanist who actively opposed "racism and oppression in any form and in any country"; that Shahak possessed a "genuinely prophetic Jewish voice, one which ardently advocated democracy and human rights." In an obituary, the journalist Elfi Pallis called Shahak essentially "an old-fashioned liberal" in principle, thought, and action. Moreover, Michel Warschawski said that Israel Shahak was "the last Israeli liberal", who was "above all, one of the last philosophers of the eighteenth-century school of enlightenment, rationalism, and liberalism, in the American meaning of the concept."

== Selected bibliography ==
- Israel Shahak, (ed.), The Non-Jew in the Jewish State; a collection of Documents, Jerusalem, 1975
- Israel Shahak (ed), Begin & Co as they really are, Glasgow 1977
- Israel Shahak and Noam Chomsky, Israel's Global Role: Weapons for Repression (Studies in Geophysical Optics and Remote Sensing), Association of Arab-American University Graduates, Inc., April 1982, paperback, ISBN 0-937694-51-7
- Israel Shahak, Israel's Global Role: Weapons for Repression (Special Reports, No. 4), Association of Arab-American University Graduates, 1982, paperback
- Israel Shahak, (ed.), The Zionist Plan for the Middle East (a translation of Oded Yinon's "A Strategy for Israel in the Nineteen Eighties" or the "Yinon Plan", Association of Arab-American University Graduates, Inc., October 1982, paperback, ISBN 0-937694-56-8
- Israel Shahak, Jewish History, Jewish Religion: The Weight of Three Thousand Years: Pluto Press, London, 1994, ISBN 978-0-7453-0819-7; Pluto Press, London, 2008, ISBN 978-0-7453-2840-9
- Israel Shahak, Open Secrets: Israeli Foreign and Nuclear Policies, Pluto Press, London, 1997
- Israel Shahak and Norton Mezvinsky, Jewish Fundamentalism in Israel (Pluto Middle Eastern Series), Pluto Press (UK), October 1999, hardcover, 176 pages, ISBN 0-7453-1281-0; trade paperback, Pluto Press, (UK), October 1999, ISBN 0-7453-1276-4; 2nd edition with new introduction by Norton Mezvinsky, trade paperback July 2004, 224 pages
