= Marc Mezvinsky =

American investor and businessman (b. 1977)

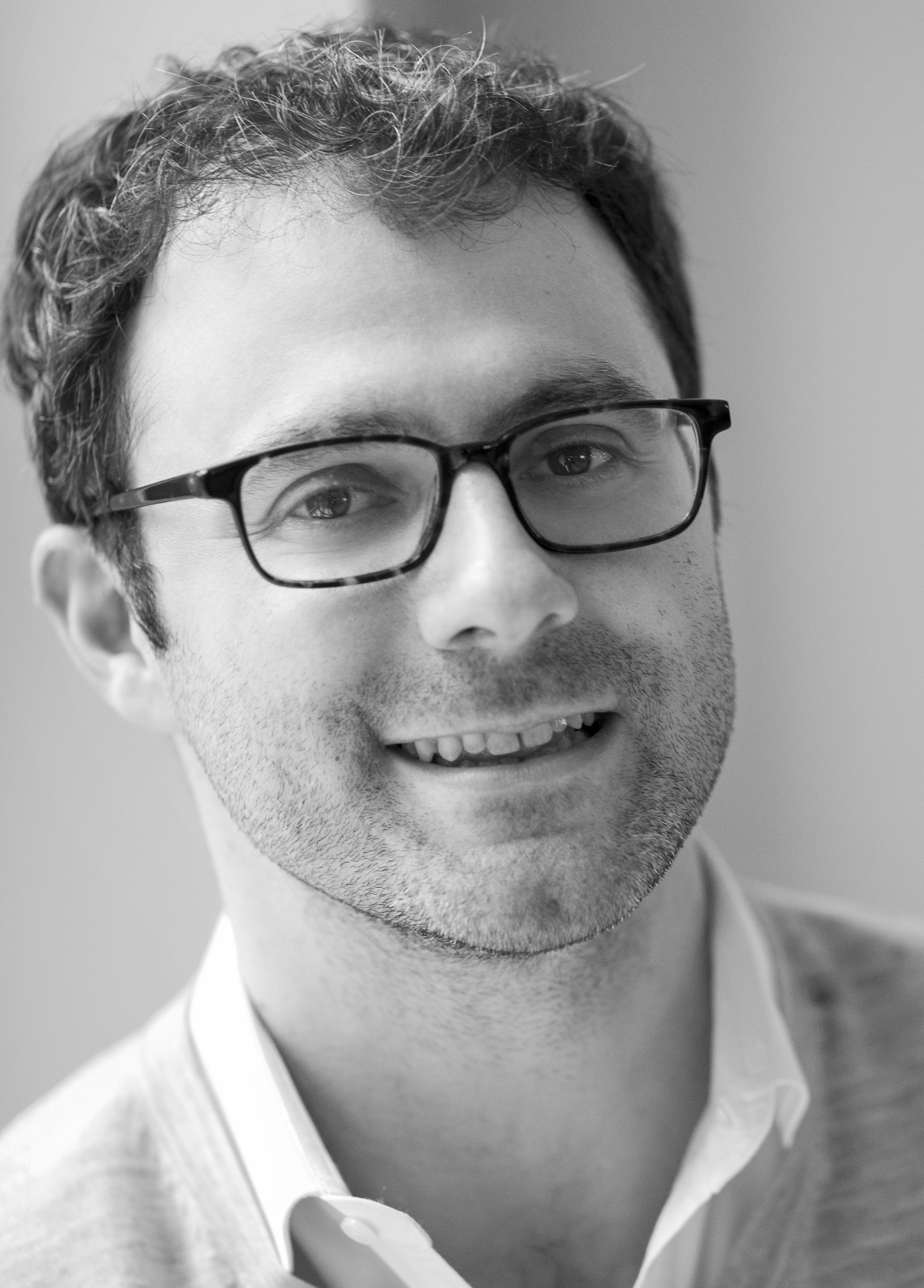
- Mezvinsky in 2017
- Born: Marc Margolies Mezvinsky; December 10, 1977 (age 48); Philadelphia, Pennsylvania, U.S.
- Education: Stanford University (BA); Pembroke College, Oxford (MA)
- Political party: Democratic
- Spouse: Chelsea Clinton (m. 2010)
- Children: 3
- Parents: Edward Mezvinsky (father); Marjorie Margolies (mother)
- Relatives: Norton Mezvinsky (uncle); Bill Clinton (father-in-law); Hillary Clinton (mother-in-law)

Marc Margolies Mezvinsky (born December 10, 1977) is an American investor and partner at TPG. He has served previously as vice chairman at Social Capital. He is the husband of Chelsea Clinton, daughter of former president Bill Clinton and former secretary of state Hillary Clinton.

== Early life and education ==
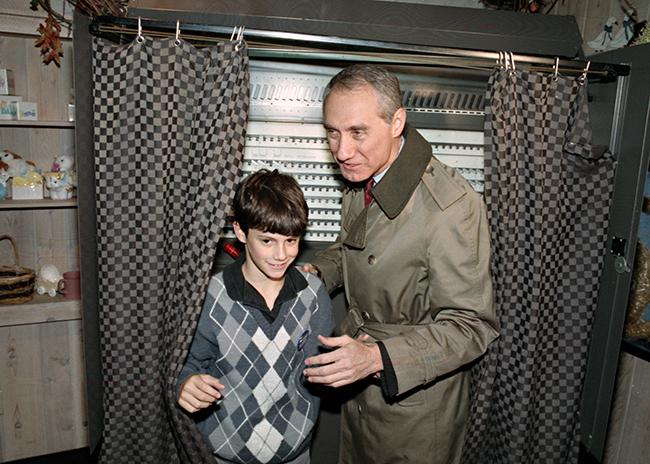
Marc Mezvinsky with his father Edward Mezvinsky in 1988

Mezvinsky was born in Philadelphia, Pennsylvania, and grew up attending a Conservative Jewish synagogue and Friends' Central School, a Quaker school outside of Philadelphia. His parents are both former Democratic members of the U.S. House of Representatives. His father is Edward Mezvinsky (b. 1937) and his mother is Marjorie Margolies (b. 1942).

Mezvinsky has 10 brothers and sisters, including five adopted siblings. His mother wrote a book, They Came to Stay, about her experiences adopting children from Korea and Vietnam as a single woman. The Mezvinskys took a number of refugee families into their home and arranged surgeries and adoptions for distressed children from abroad.

Mezvinsky graduated from Stanford University in 2000, earning a BA in religious studies and philosophy. He then attended Pembroke College, Oxford, where he received his MA in Politics, Philosophy and Economics.

== Personal life ==
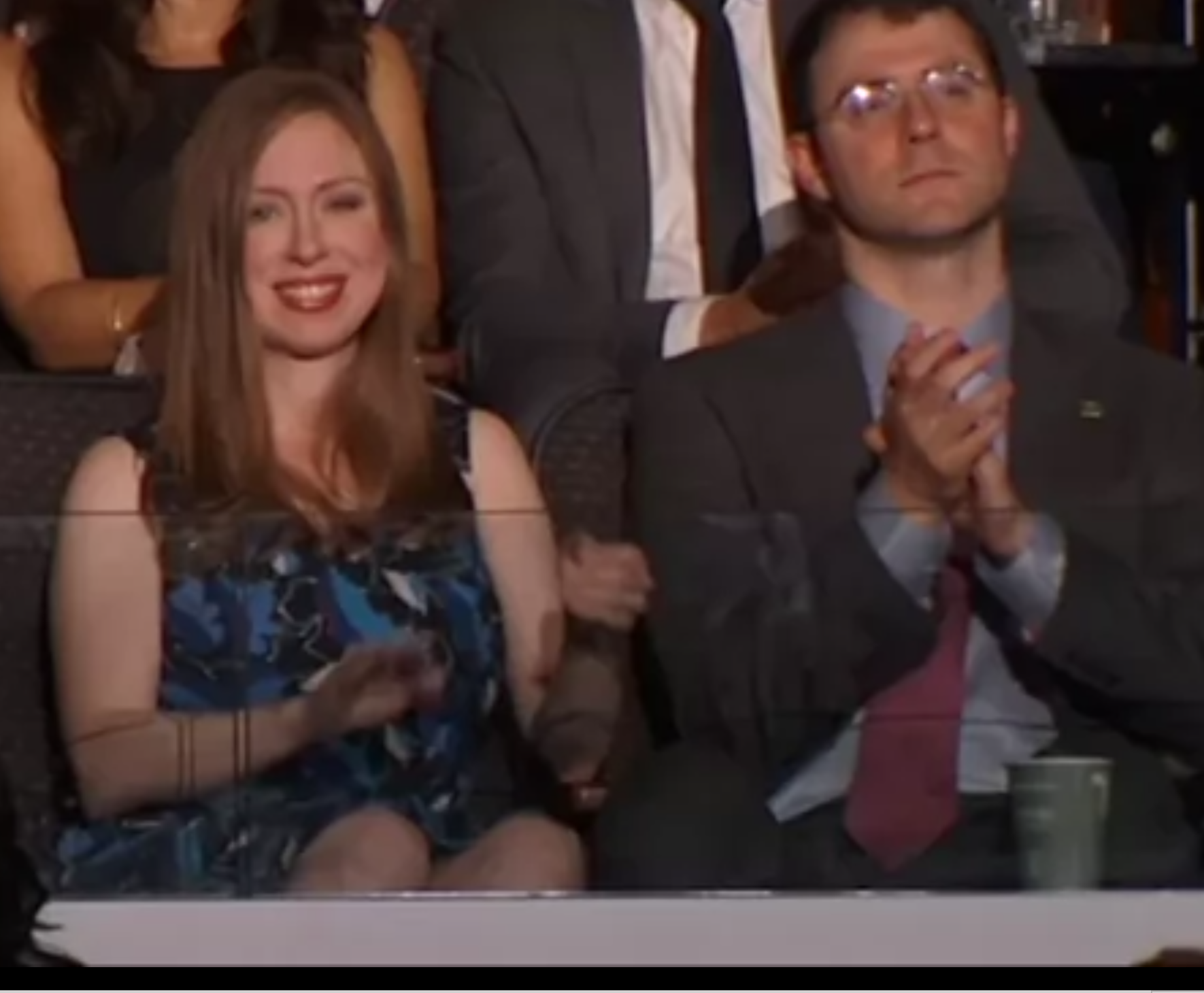
Mezvinsky and Clinton at the 2016 Democratic National Convention

Mezvinsky first met Chelsea Clinton as a teenager at a 1993 Democratic political retreat in Hilton Head, South Carolina as Mezvinsky's parents had both been members of Congress and were friends with the Clintons in the 1990s. They were first reported to be a couple in 2005, and became engaged in 2009. In July 2010, Mezvinsky married Chelsea Clinton in an interfaith ceremony in Rhinebeck, New York.

On September 26, 2014, Chelsea Clinton gave birth to their daughter Charlotte Clinton Mezvinsky. On June 18, 2016, Clinton gave birth to their son Aidan Clinton Mezvinsky. On July 22, 2019, she gave birth to their second son, Jasper Clinton Mezvinsky.

== Philanthropy ==
Mezvinsky serves on the board of the Pembroke College Foundation and the Ann Romney Center for Neurologic Diseases, an organization dedicated to transforming the future of medicine through collaboration and patient-centered research. He also served on the board of Madison Square Park Conservancy.

== Business career ==
After graduation, he worked at Goldman Sachs as an emerging markets foreign exchange strategist, and later went on to join the global macro proprietary trading desk. He served as senior partner at 3G Capital before leaving to start his own hedge fund, Eaglevale Partners, a traditional multi-strategy investment fund, focused on currencies, commodities and bonds. Eaglevale Partners closed in 2016. Mezvinsky joined Social Capital as Vice Chairman in 2017 where he helped the firm manage its business development and growing portfolio of companies. He left Social Capital in the spring of 2018.

In 2019, Mezvinsky joined TPG as a managing director and business unit partner. In 2022, Mezvinsky became a partner of the firm.
