= Open Admissions =

Open Admissions is a play in two acts by Shirley Lauro that premiered in 1982 at the Long Wharf Theatre under the direction of Arvin Brown. The play had its Broadway debut on January 29, 1984 at the Music Box Theatre under the direction of Elinor Renfield where it ran for a total of 17 performances. The Broadway production starred Calvin Levels as Calvin Jefferson, Marilyn Rockafellow as Ginny Carlsen, Nan-Lynn Nelson as Salina Jones, Pam Potillo as Georgia Jones, and Sloane Shelton as Professor Clare Block. The play depicts the travails of a professor at a second-rate college, including an unsupportive husband. Levels won a Theatre World Award and was nominated for both a Tony Award and Drama Desk Award for his performance. Rockafellow also received a Drama Desk Award nomination. On Broadway, Open Admissions received a Theatre World Award, The Dramatists Guild Hull-Warriner Award.

This drama is usually cast with as a racially and ethnically mixed production and the story explores equal opportunity in college admissions. Calvin Jefferson, a sophomore at an urban college not unlike New York's City College, reads at the fifth grade level yet frequently gets Bs. He is slowly beginning to understand that it will take more than a diploma to make him competitive in the real world. It will take basic skills he lacks. Calvin begs his speech teacher, an overburdened, underpaid and under appreciated victim of the system, for help. She does try but it is likely too little, too late.

== Television adaptation ==
In 1988 a television movie version of the play was made by Thom Mount's The Mount Company and Viacom using a screenplay by Lauro. The movie was directed by Gus Trikonis and starred Michael Beach as Calvin, Jane Alexander as Ginny, Dennis Farina as Fred, and Estelle Parsons as Clare Block.

== Awards and nominations ==
=== Original Broadway production ===
Year	Award	Category	Nominee	Result
1984	Tony Award	Best Actor in a Play	Calvin Levels	Nominated
1984	Drama Desk Award	Outstanding Actress in a Play	Marilyn Rockafellow	Nominated
1984	Drama Desk Award	Outstanding Featured Actor in a Play	Calvin Levels	Nominated
1984	Theatre World Award		Calvin Levels	Won

== See also ==
- Open admissions
