= Chelsea Clinton =

American writer (born 1980)

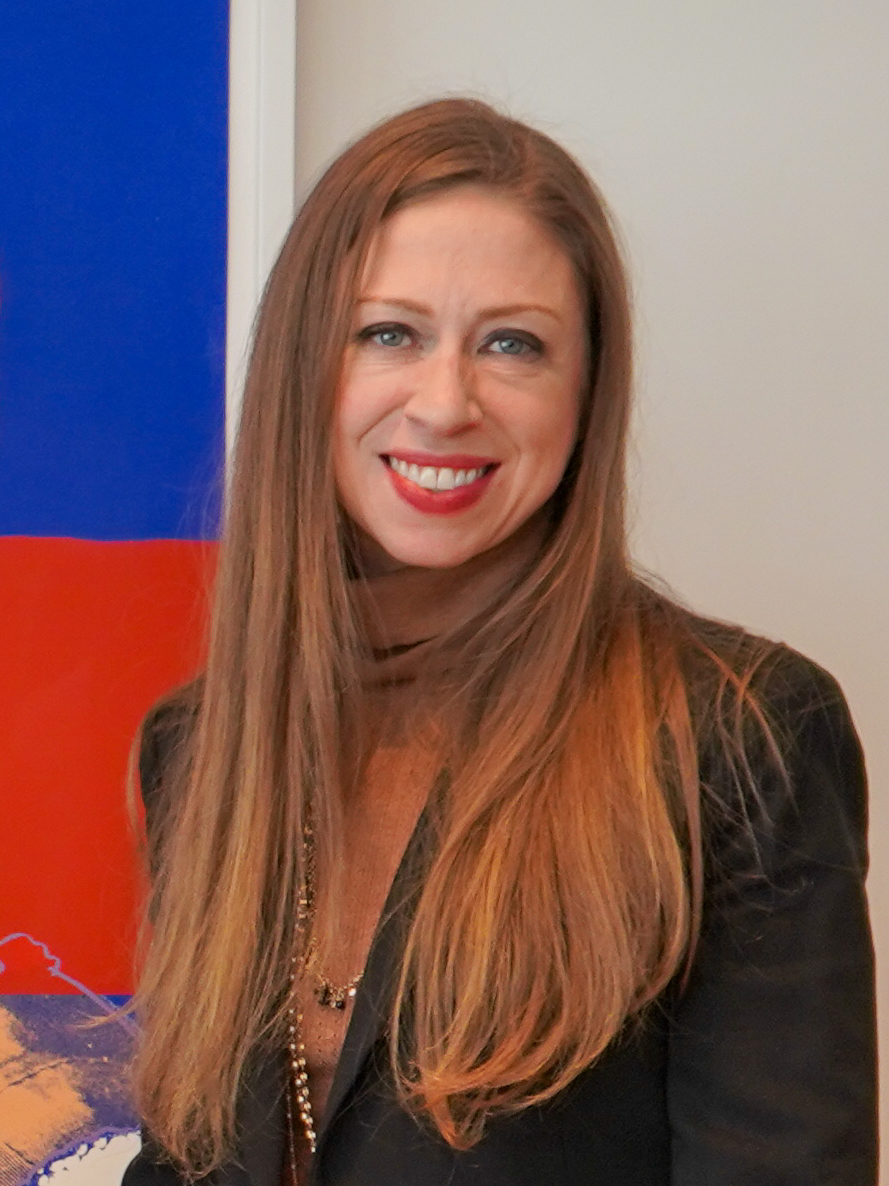
- Clinton in 2024
- Born: Chelsea Victoria Clinton; February 27, 1980 (age 46); Little Rock, Arkansas, U.S.
- Education: Stanford University (BA); University College, Oxford (MPhil, DPhil); New York University (attended); Columbia University (MPH)
- Political party: Democratic
- Spouse: Marc Mezvinsky (m. 2010)
- Children: 3
- Parents: Bill Clinton; Hillary Clinton
- Relatives: Clinton family

Academic background
- Thesis: The Global Fund: An Experiment in Global Governance (2014)
- Doctoral advisor: Ngaire Woods

Chelsea Victoria Clinton (born February 27, 1980) is an American writer. She is the only child of former U.S. President Bill Clinton and former U.S. Secretary of State Hillary Clinton.

Clinton was born in Little Rock, Arkansas, during her father's first term as governor of Arkansas. She attended public schools there until her father was elected president and the family moved to the White House, when she began attending the private Sidwell Friends School. Clinton received an undergraduate degree at Stanford University, later earning master's degrees from University of Oxford and Columbia University and a Doctor of Philosophy in international relations from the University of Oxford in 2014.

In 2007 and 2008, Clinton campaigned extensively on American college campuses for her mother's Democratic presidential nomination bid and introduced her at the 2008 Democratic National Convention. She assumed a similar role in her mother's 2016 presidential campaign, making more than 200 public appearances as her surrogate and again introducing her at the Democratic National Convention.

Clinton has worked for McKinsey & Company, Avenue Capital Group, Columbia University, New York University, and NBC. She serves on several boards, including the board of the Clinton Foundation. Clinton has authored and co-authored best-selling children's non-fiction books and has co-authored a scholarly book for adults on global health policy.

== Early life ==
Chelsea Victoria Clinton was born in Little Rock, Arkansas on February 27, 1980. She is the only child of Hillary and Bill Clinton. Her name was inspired by a visit to the Chelsea neighborhood of London during a Christmas 1978 vacation. Hillary said that upon hearing the 1969 Judy Collins recording of the Joni Mitchell song "Chelsea Morning", Bill remarked, "If we ever have a daughter, her name should be Chelsea".

When Clinton was two years old, she accompanied her parents as they campaigned throughout Arkansas for her father's gubernatorial race. She learned to read and write at a very young age. Clinton claims that she started reading the newspaper by the age of three and also wrote a letter to President Ronald Reagan when she was only five. In the letter, which was photocopied and preserved by her father, she asked President Reagan not to visit a military cemetery in West Germany that includes graves of Nazi soldiers. Clinton attended Forest Park Elementary School, Booker Arts and Science Magnet Elementary School and Horace Mann Junior High School, both Little Rock public schools. She skipped the third grade. In 1992, Clinton's father was first elected president, and she remained active at school right until the family's move to Washington, playing the Ghost of Christmas Past in her school's production of A Christmas Carol and dancing in Little Rock's production of The Nutcracker. As a young child, Clinton was raised in her father's Southern Baptist faith.

== White House years ==
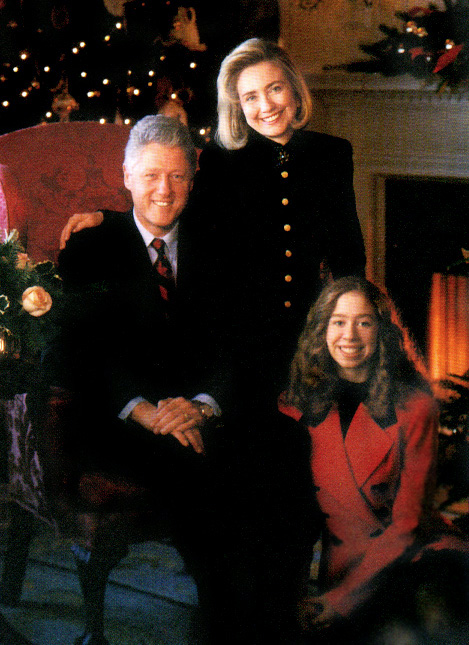
White House portrait of the Clintons

Chelsea moved into the White House with her parents and was given the Secret Service codename "Energy" on the day of her father's first inauguration in January 1993. Her parents wanted her to have a normal childhood, and they hoped to shield her from the media spotlight.

Hillary Clinton followed the advice of Jacqueline Kennedy Onassis on raising children in the White House, and asked the press to limit coverage of Chelsea to her participation in public events such as state visits. Margaret Truman, daughter of former president Harry S. Truman, supported the Clintons, and in March 1993 wrote a letter to the editor of The New York Times about the damage that could be done if the press made Chelsea a subject of intense coverage.

Following her attendance at Horace Mann Magnet Middle School in Little Rock, the Clintons decided to remove Chelsea from public school and send her to Sidwell Friends School, a private school in Washington, D.C. A veteran of Model United Nations, Clinton was a 1997 National Merit Scholarship semifinalist. She graduated from Sidwell in 1997; her father spoke at the graduation ceremony. Media speculation regarding her choice of college resulted in heavy press coverage. She ultimately chose to attend Stanford University.

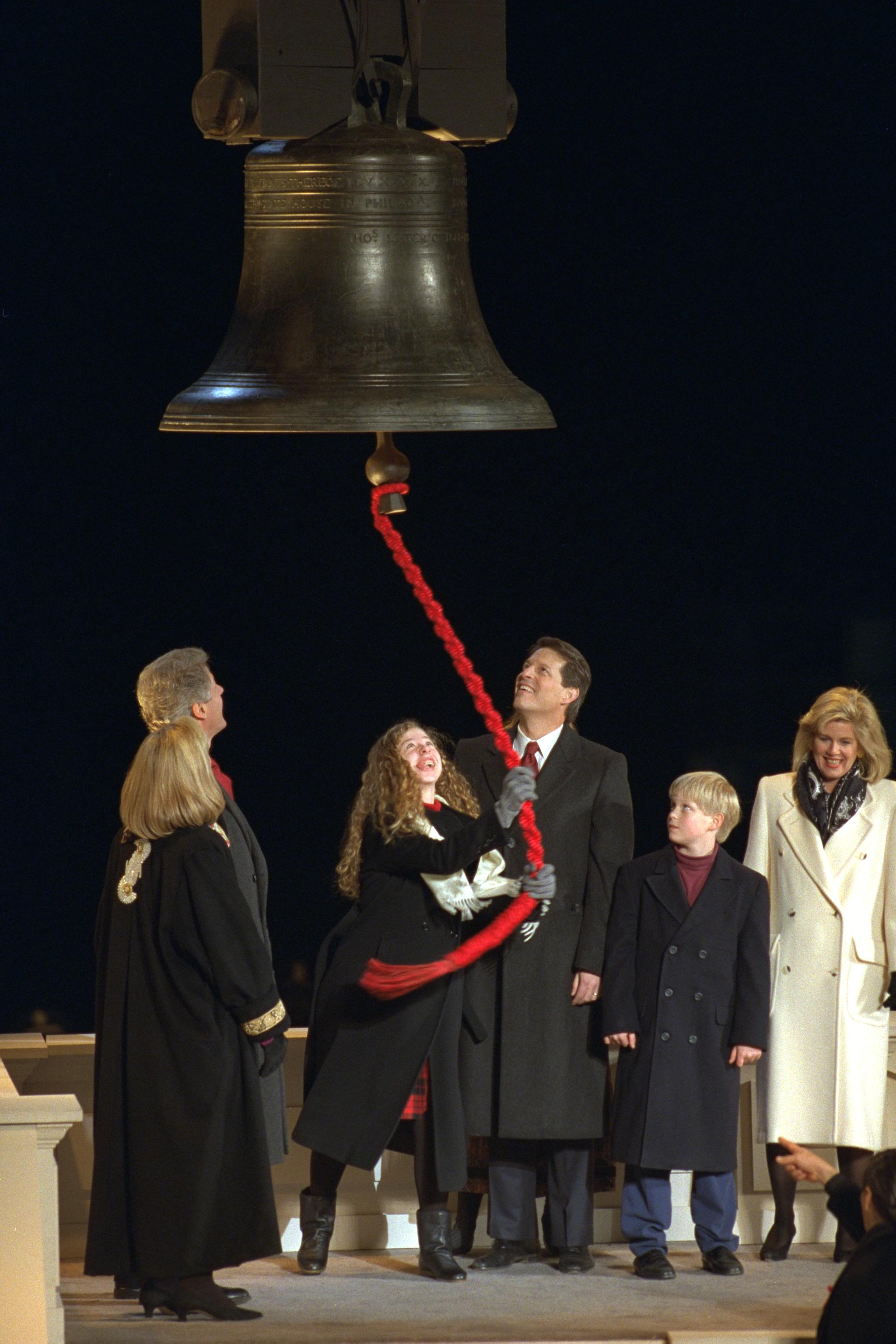
Clinton rings a replica of the Liberty Bell at her father's first inauguration.

Throughout her father's time in the White House, journalists debated the issue of allowing Clinton to retain her privacy. Most media outlets concluded that she should be off-limits due to her age, although Rush Limbaugh and Saturday Night Live both broadcast material mocking her appearance. During this phase of her life, her father said, "We really work hard on making sure that Chelsea doesn't let other people define her sense of her own self-worth ... It's tough when you are an adolescent ... but I think she'll be ok."

In early 1999, the Clintons learned of an article being planned by People that examined Chelsea's relationship with her parents in the wake of the impending vote on President Clinton's impeachment. The Secret Service told the magazine they had concerns that the story could compromise Chelsea's security. People ran the story anyway, and Bill and Hillary issued a statement expressing their disappointment. Carol Wallace, People's managing editor, felt that Chelsea, then 19, was "an eyewitness to family drama and historical events" and thus "a valid journalistic subject". The article, entitled "Grace Under Fire", was published in February 1999 with a cover photo of Chelsea and Hillary.

During her father's eight years in office, there were 32 stories in The New York Times and 87 network news stories about Chelsea. One author determined that she had received the most television coverage of all presidential children preceding her, although they noted that only she and Maureen Reagan had a full eight years as presidential children. During the last year of her father's presidency, Chelsea assumed some White House hostess responsibilities when her mother was campaigning for the U.S. Senate, traveling with her father on several overseas trips and attending state dinners with him.

=== Activities ===
Although her father was a Southern Baptist, Clinton was raised in and adheres to her mother's Methodist faith. As a teenager, she attended the youth ministry group at Foundry United Methodist Church in Washington, where her parents sometimes joined her. An adult group leader thought Clinton to be "a terrific kid" and observed that she was treated as an equal in the group.

At age four, Clinton had begun taking dance classes in Arkansas, and she continued her dance training at the Washington School of Ballet for several years. She was cast in the role of the Favorite Aunt in the 1993 Washington Ballet production of Tchaikovsky's The Nutcracker.

== Education and academic life ==
=== Stanford University ===
Clinton entered Stanford University in the fall of 1997. The week before she arrived on campus, her mother published an open letter in her syndicated column asking journalists to leave her daughter alone. Chelsea arrived at Stanford in a motorcade with her parents, Secret Service agents, and almost 250 journalists. For her security, bullet-proof glass was installed in her dorm windows and surveillance cameras were placed in hallways. Secret Service agents in plain clothes lived in her dorm. With the exception of an occasional tabloid story written about her, Chelsea's four years at Stanford remained out of public view.

Clinton obtained a Bachelor of Arts degree in history, with highest honors, at Stanford in 2001. The topic of her 167-page senior thesis was the 1998 Good Friday Agreement in Northern Ireland.

=== Further education ===
Starting in 2001, Chelsea pursued a master's degree at University College of the University of Oxford where her father had studied politics as a Rhodes Scholar. Upon the recommendation of British and American advisers, the university implemented security measures, and fellow students were asked not to discuss her with the press.

Arriving at Oxford just after the September 11 attacks, Clinton was drawn to other American students who were also feeling the emotional after-effects of the trauma. She told Talk magazine:

Every day I encounter some sort of anti-American feeling. Over the summer, I thought I would seek out non-Americans as friends, just for diversity's sake. Now I find that I want to be around Americans—people who I know are thinking about our country as much as I am.

Clinton was criticized for those remarks in the London press and by the newspaper Oxford Student, whose editorial attacking her angered the university. However, people who met Clinton at that time described her as charming, poised and unaffected, as she adjusted successfully to life abroad.

At Oxford University in 2003, Clinton completed a Master of Philosophy degree in international relations. Her 132-page thesis was titled The Global Fund to Fight AIDS, TB and Malaria: A Response to Global Threats, a Part of a Global Future, supervised by Jennifer Welsh and Ngaire Woods. Following her graduation, she returned to the United States.

In the spring of 2010, Clinton completed a Master of Public Health degree at the Mailman School of Public Health of Columbia University. She pursued Doctor of Philosophy coursework at New York University's Robert F. Wagner Graduate School of Public Service. In 2011, Clinton transferred back to University College, Oxford, to complete her Doctor of Philosophy degree in international relations. She stated that she took this step for the purpose of working with her preferred doctoral advisor, Ngaire Woods. Clinton finished her dissertation in New York City and was awarded the degree in May 2014. Her dissertation was entitled The Global Fund: An Experiment in Global Governance.

Clinton received an award in 2012 from interfaith organization Temple of Understanding for her "work in advancing a new model of integrating interfaith and cross-cultural education into campus life", together with Imam Khalid Latif and Rabbi Yehuda Sarna.

== Professional life ==
In 2003, Clinton joined the consulting firm McKinsey & Company in New York City. She began working for Avenue Capital Group in late 2006. She has served on the board of the School of American Ballet and on IAC's board of directors. In March 2017, Clinton was named to the board of directors of Expedia Group.

Starting in 2010, Clinton began serving as Assistant Vice-Provost for the Global Network University of New York University (NYU), working on international recruitment strategies. She is the co-founder of the Of Many Institute for Multifaith Leadership at NYU and serves as its co-chair.

In November 2011, NBC hired Clinton as a special correspondent. One of her roles was reporting stories about "Making a Difference" for NBC Nightly News and Rock Center with Brian Williams. Clinton received a three-month contract that allowed her to continue working for the Clinton Foundation and to pursue her education. The hiring "was met with cries of nepotism". Despite Clinton's lack of prior experience in broadcasting or journalism, she reportedly was hired at an annual salary of $600,000 before shifting to a month-to-month contract in 2014. During the period when she was making $600,000 per year, Clinton reportedly received approximately $26,724 for each minute that she was on the air.

Clinton's first appearance on NBC occurred on the December 12, 2011 episode of Rock Center. Following her debut, Hank Steuver of the Washington Post commented, "'Either we’re spoiled by TV’s unlimited population of giant personalities or this woman is one of the most boring people of her era'". Although she received some unfavorable reviews for her work, Clinton's contract with NBC was renewed in February 2012. In April 2013, Clinton conducted an interview with the GEICO gecko. Rock Center ended in May 2013, and she left the network in August 2014.

Clinton began teaching graduate classes at the Mailman School of Public Health of Columbia University in 2012.

In a 2014 interview, Clinton said, "'I’ve tried really hard to care about things that were very different from my parents. I was curious if I could care about [money] on some fundamental level, and I couldn’t. That wasn’t the metric of success I wanted in my life'".

In 2020, Clinton co-founded Metrodora Ventures, a venture capital fund.

In April 2021, Clinton launched In Fact with Chelsea Clinton, a podcast on iHeartMedia's iHeartPodcast network.

=== Clinton Foundation ===
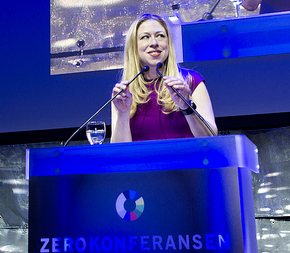
Clinton speaks at the 2013 Zerokonferansen convention as a representative of the Clinton Foundation.

Since 2011, Clinton has taken a prominent role at the family's Clinton Foundation and has had a seat on its board. When she joined in 2013, the foundation was renamed the Bill, Hillary and Chelsea Clinton Foundation. She served as co-chair for a fundraising week for the Foundation, subsequently becoming the foundation's Vice Chair. As part of her work with the Foundation, Clinton gives paid speeches; her speaking fees go directly to the foundation, whose goals relate to improving global health, creating opportunities for women, and promoting economic growth. She focuses on early brain and language development through the Too Small to Fail initiative and supports female entrepreneurs through the Women in Renewable Energy Network.

=== Investments ===
Clinton has advocated for affordability and improved quality pediatric services for parents. In 2022, she invested in Summer Health, a startup pediatric telehealth platform that offers virtual care services connecting parents with pediatricians, sleep coaches, and lactation experts.

=== Author ===
==== Children's non-fiction ====
In September 2015, Clinton's first children's book, It's Your World: Get Informed, Get Inspired and Get Going!, was published by Philomel Books. The 400-page book is aimed at middle school students (ages 10 to 14) and introduces them to a range of social issues, encouraging them to take action to make the world a better place. The paperback edition was published by Puffin Books in 2017.

In May 2017, her second children's book, She Persisted: 13 American Women Who Changed the World, illustrated by Alexandra Boiger, was published by Philomel Books. Upon its release, the book became a bestseller, reaching No. 1 on The New York Times Children's Picture Books Best Sellers list on July 30, 2017. In 2019, she worked with the Berkeley, California's Bay Area Children's Theater in adapting the book into a musical play, She Persisted: The Musical, which ran from January to March.

In 2018, Clinton wrote a companion book featuring women around the world entitled She Persisted Around the World: 13 Women Who Changed History. The book debuted at No. 2 on the Times' Children's Picture Books Best Sellers list.

Clinton's fourth children's book, Start Now!: You Can Make a Difference, was published by Philomel in 2018. It is aimed at empowering young would-be activists aged seven to ten, addressing themes ranging from bullying to climate change to endangered species. In interviews, she talked about how she drew on her personal experiences and strategies for dealing with bullies growing up and as an adult.

In 2019, Clinton published her fifth children's book, Don't Let Them Disappear: 12 Endangered Species Across the Globe. The book, illustrated by Gianna Marino, is about endangered animals and is aimed at teaching children aged four to eight about species in need of protection.

Clinton continued her children's "She Persisted" series in 2020 with She Persisted in Sports: American Olympians Who Changed the Game, also published by Philomel. Again illustrated by Alexandra Boiger, this chapter book celebrates women in sports who broke records and smashed barriers with their persistence.

==== Co-authored with Hillary Clinton ====
In 2019, Clinton co-wrote a book with her mother, Hillary Clinton, titled The Book of Gutsy Women: Favorite Stories of Courage and Resilience and they embarked on a multi-city book tour together.

In 2020, the mother-daughter writing duo published Grandma's Gardens, a children's book. The book was inspired by Hillary's mother, Dorothy Rodham, who had a passion for gardening.

==== Scholarly work ====
Clinton co-authored a highly praised scholarly work on global health policy with Devi Sridhar, entitled Governing Global Health: Who Runs the World and Why?, published in 2017 by Oxford University Press. The book examines the role of partnerships between public and private entities in addressing global health issues.

=== Speaking engagements ===
In February 2024, Clinton hosted a panel at Harvard Graduate School of Education on the topic of climate change and education, focusing on the role of educators in improving the lives of children affected by climate change.

== Political activities ==
=== Hillary Clinton 2008 presidential campaign ===
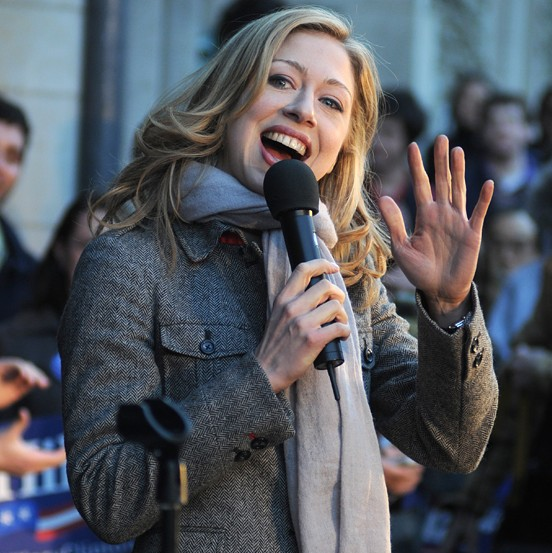
Clinton campaigning for her mother in March 2008

In December 2007, Clinton began campaigning in Iowa in support of her mother's bid for the Democratic presidential nomination. She appeared across the country, largely on college campuses. By early April 2008, she had spoken at 100 colleges on behalf of her mother's candidacy.

While campaigning, Clinton answered audience questions but did not give interviews or respond to press questions, including one from a nine-year-old Scholastic News reporter asking whether her father would be a good "first man". She replied, "I'm sorry, I don't talk to the press and that applies to you, unfortunately. Even though I think you're cute." Philippe Reines, her mother's press secretary, intervened when the press attempted to approach Chelsea directly.

When MSNBC reporter David Shuster characterized Clinton's participation in her mother's campaign as "sort of being pimped out", the Clinton campaign objected. Shuster subsequently apologized on-air and was suspended for two weeks.

The first time she was asked about her mother's handling of the Clinton–Lewinsky scandal at a campaign stop Clinton responded, "I do not think that is any of your business." As she became a more experienced campaigner, she refined her responses and deflected questions on the issue with comments such as, "If that's what you want to vote on, that's what you should vote on. But I think there are other people [who are] going to vote on things like healthcare and economics."

Hillary Clinton conceded the 2008 Democratic presidential nomination to Barack Obama on June 7, 2008. At the 2008 Democratic National Convention, Chelsea called Hillary "my hero and my mother" and introduced her with a long video tribute.

=== Hillary Clinton 2016 presidential campaign ===
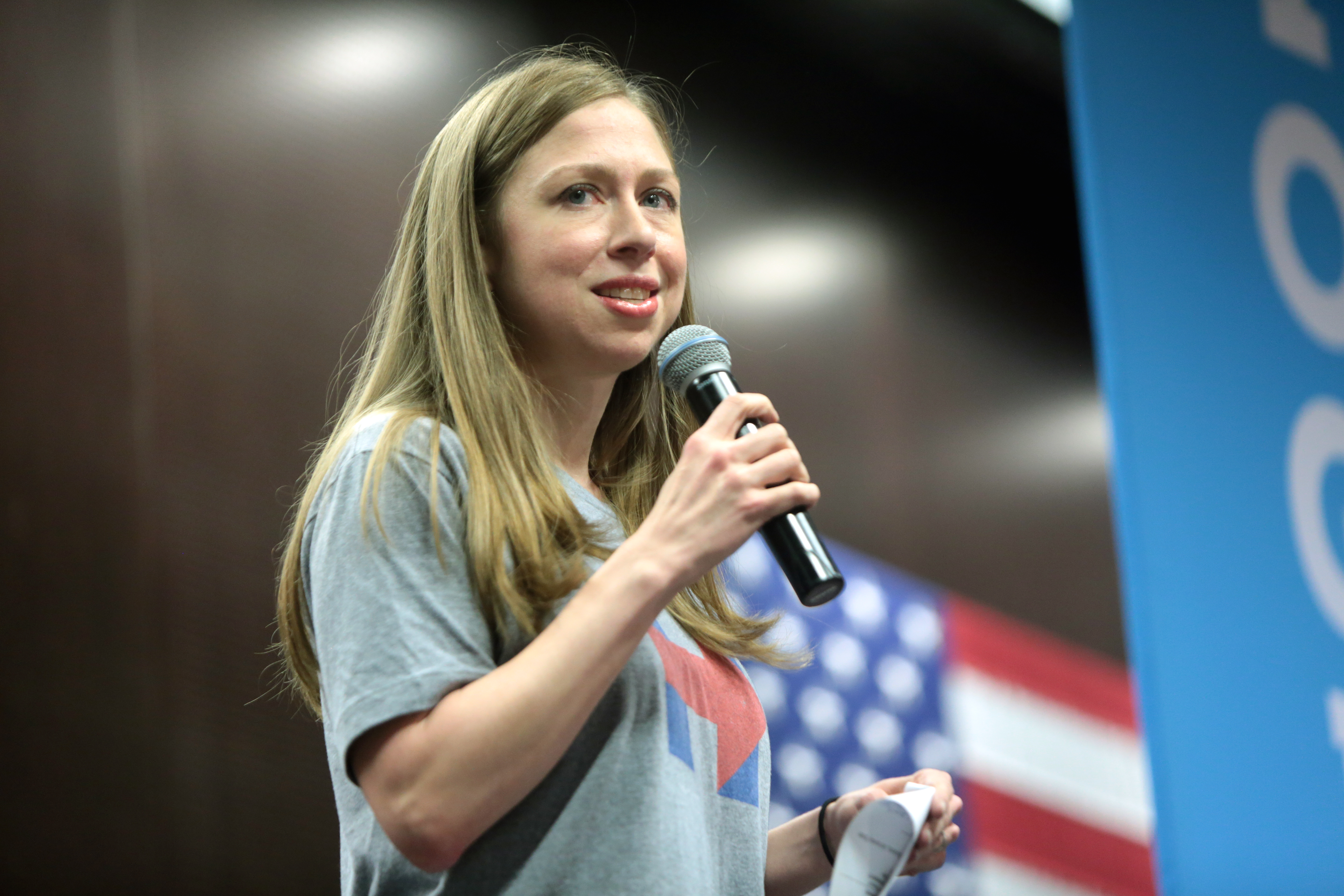
Clinton speaks at a 2016 campaign rally for her mother.

As she did in 2008, Clinton again took an active part in her mother's presidential campaign in 2016, expanding her role as surrogate at more than 200 public events across the country, including and beyond college campuses. In July 2016, she introduced her mother at the Democratic National Convention in Philadelphia, in a personal, emotional tribute recalling her own upbringing and describing her mother's commitment to issues and to public service.

Even before her mother received the Democratic nomination, Clinton frequently spoke out against candidate Donald Trump's positions and rhetoric. At one appearance in September 2016, while answering a question about her mother's position supporting medical marijuana research, Clinton got some attention for an inaccurate comment she made regarding drug interactions with marijuana; she walked back the comment a few days later, acknowledging that she misspoke.

On November 9, 2016, Hillary Clinton conceded the presidential race to Republican candidate Donald Trump. After the 2016 election, Chelsea Clinton's political commentary on her Twitter account led to speculation that she might have political aspirations of her own.

== Personal life ==
Clinton married investment banker Marc Mezvinsky on July 31, 2010, in an interfaith ceremony at the Astor Courts estate in Rhinebeck, New York. Mezvinsky is Jewish, and his parents, Marjorie Margolies and Edward Mezvinsky, are both former members of Congress. The senior Clintons and Mezvinskys were friends in the 1990s and their children met on a Renaissance Weekend retreat in Hilton Head Island, South Carolina. They first were reported to be a couple in 2005, and they became engaged over Thanksgiving weekend in 2009.

Following their wedding, the couple lived in New York City's Gramercy Park neighborhood for three years and later purchased a $10.5 million condominium in the NoMad district of Manhattan. Their first child, a daughter was born on September 26, 2014. Their second child, a son was born on June 18, 2016. Shortly after their second son was born, the family moved to the nearby Flatiron District. Their third child, a son was born on July 22, 2019.

== In popular culture ==
Clinton is portrayed in the 1996 film Beavis and Butt-Head Do America, where Butt-Head attempts to flirt with her after finding her bedroom at the White House; she responds by throwing him out the window.

In Rush Hour, Chris Tucker's character, Detective James Carter, shouts the line: "Fifty million dollars?! Man, who do you think you kidnapped? Chelsea Clinton?".

In Zenon: Girl of the 21st Century, a Disney Channel Original Movie set in the year 2049, Clinton is the President of the United States.

In Clarissa Explains It All, the title character (Melissa Joan Hart) repeatedly imagines Clinton becoming President of the United States.

Clinton is the direct inspiration for the 2004 film Chasing Liberty, starring Mandy Moore and Matthew Goode.

In January 2015, Clinton appeared in a Sesame Street skit with Elmo, advocating the importance of reading to young children.

Clinton appeared as herself in the final scene of series 3 of the Channel 4 sitcom Derry Girls.

Chelsea Clinton is portrayed by Anastasia Barkow in the third season of American Crime Story, Impeachment: American Crime Story.

== Awards and recognitions ==
Clinton has received awards and honors, including:

- Children's Defense Fund Children's Champion Award, 2019
- Ida. S. Scudder Centennial Woman's Empowerment Award, 2018
- BBC's 100 women, 2018
- Mother's Day Council Outstanding Mother Award, 2018
- BlogHer Voices of the Year Call to Action Award, 2018
- Variety Impact Award, 2017
- City Harvest Award for Commitment, 2017
- Virginia A. Hodgkinson Research Book Prize, 2017
- Glamour Woman of the Year, 2014
- Riverkeeper Honoree, 2014
- AJC Interfaith Leadership Award, 2014
- Harvard School of Public Health Next Generation Award, 2013
- Emery S. Hetrick Award, 2013
- New York Observer 20 Most Important Philanthropists, 2013

== Published works ==
=== Books ===
- It's your world: get informed, get inspired & get going!. Philomel. September 2015. ISBN 978-0399176128.
- Governing global health: who runs the world and why?. Oxford University Press. February 2017. ISBN 978-0190253271. (co-author Devi Sridhar)
- She persisted: 13 American women who changed the world. Philomel. May 2017. ISBN 9781524741723.
- She persisted around the world: 13 women who changed history. Philomel. March 2018. ISBN 978-0525516996.
- Start now!: you can make a difference. Philomel. October 2018. ISBN 978-0525514367.
- Don't let them disappear: 12 endangered species across the globe. Philomel. April 2019. ISBN 978-0525514329.
- A Great Party—Designing The Perfect Celebration. Rizzoli. September 2019. ISBN 978-0847861279. (by Bryan Rafanelli, foreword by Chelsea Clinton)
- The Book of Gutsy Women: Favorite Stories of Courage and Resilience. Simon & Schuster. October 2019. ISBN 978-1501178412. (co-author Hillary Clinton)
- Grandma's gardens. Philomel. March 2020. ISBN 978-0593115350. (co-author Hillary Clinton)
- Clinton, Chelsea (September 2020). She persisted in sports : American Olympians who changed the game. Penguin. ISBN 978-0593114544.
