= Israeli League for Human and Civil Rights =

Organisation

The Israeli League for Human and Civil Rights is an Israeli human rights group. It was founded in 1935 with the purpose of defending the human rights of Jews and Arabs in Israel and Palestine. Dr. Israel Shahak, Israeli professor and activist, was chairman of the league from 1970 to 1991.

== History ==
The Israeli League for Human and Civil Rights was founded in 1935 with the aim of "defending the human rights of Jews and Arabs under the British Mandate in Palestine."

Dr. Israel Shahak was elected chairman of the League in April 1970 and held the role until his retirement in 1991. In 1971, the acting chairman was Ari Shaul and the treasurer was Yaffa Garsh. It was briefly a member of the International League for Human Rights, but was suspended in 1973. This was related to the organisation's 1972 Annual General Meeting, on 16 November, which was broken up by some 200 members of the Young Israeli Labor Party, assisted by members of the GSS in an "attempted coup" from within the League.

Both Uri Davis and Felicia Langer have served as vice-chair.

== Work ==
In Noam Chomsky's book The Fateful Triangle, the league's work in documenting and sharing information about human rights violations in Israel's occupied territories was mentioned as especially notable. In 1988, the league published "Report on the Violations of Human Rights in the Occupied Territories During The Uprising." Chomsky wrote of chairman Shahak, "Chairman from 1970, Dr. Israel Shahak, has compiled a personal record of courage and commitment to human rights that few people anywhere can equal, and has been untiring in exposing the facts about the occupation and circulating information." Members of leadership of the league have testified in United Nations hearings about the conditions of human rights in the region.
