= Morris Lazaron =

Rabbi Morris Samuel Lazaron
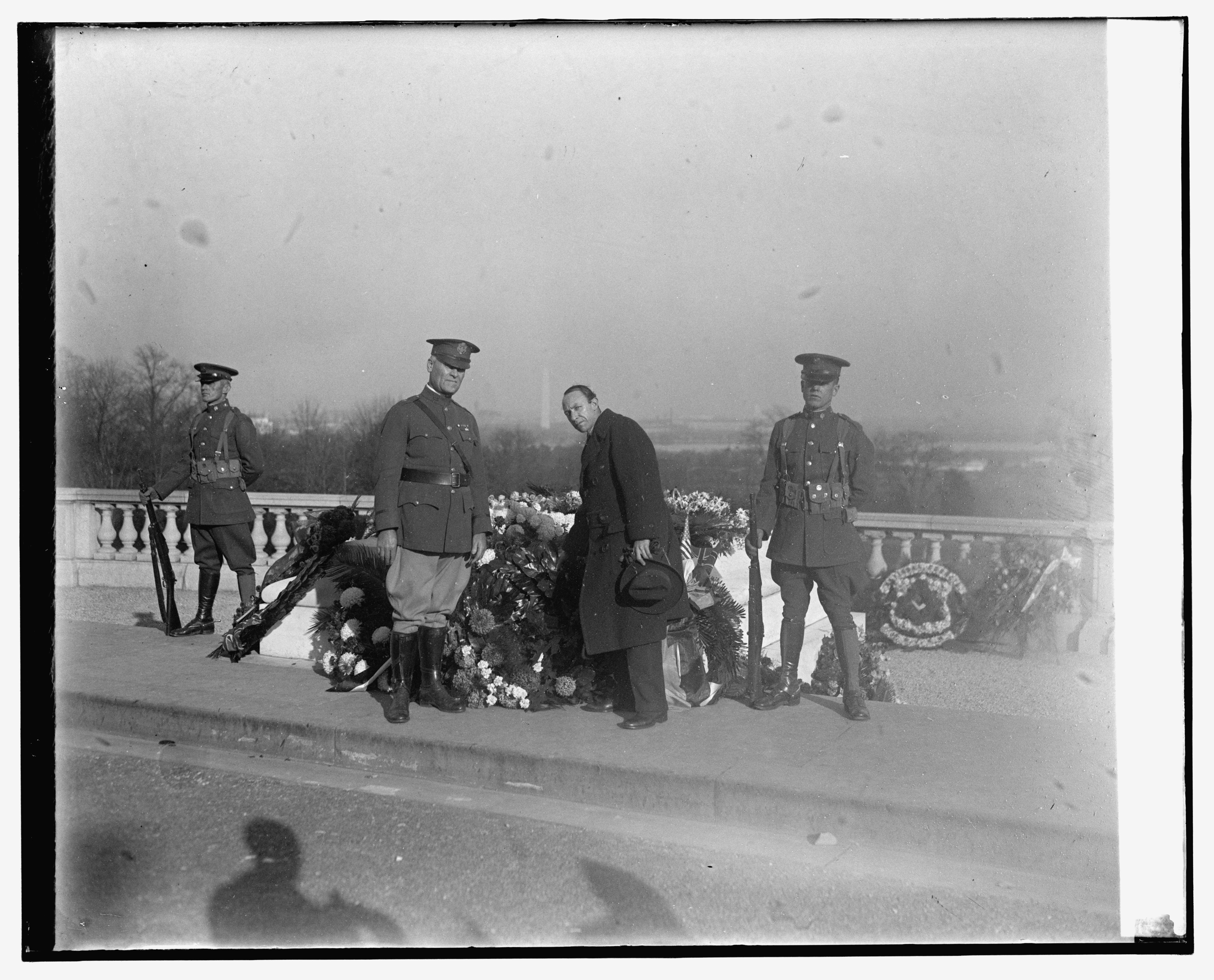

Personal life
- Born: April 16, 1888 Savannah, Georgia, United States
- Died: June 5, 1979 (aged 91) London, England, United Kingdom
- Spouse: Pauline Horkheimer (m. 1914; div. 1933) Hilda Rothschild Rosenblatt
- Children: Morris Jr., Harold Victor, and Clementine

Religious life
- Religion: Judaism
- Denomination: Reform Judaism

Jewish leader
- Semikhah: Hebrew Union College

Morris Lazaron (April 16, 1888 – June 5, 1979) was an American Reform rabbi and writer. He was an anti-Zionist activist.

== Early life ==
Lazaron was born on April 16, 1888, in Savannah, Georgia. His father, Samuel Louis Lazaron, was from Americus, Georgia, and his mother, Alice Zipporah de Castro, was a Sephardi Jew from New Orleans whose ancestors came from Curaçao, Saint Croix, Saint Thomas, Morocco, Amsterdam, and Lisbon.

== Career ==
In 1914, Lazaron was ordained by the Hebrew Union College. He served as a rabbi at Congregation Leshem Shomayim in Wheeling, West Virginia, for one year before being appointed as rabbi of the Baltimore Hebrew Congregation in 1915.

While opposing Jewish nationalism, political Zionism, and the creation of a Jewish state, Lazaron supported the idea of a Jewish spiritual and cultural homeland in Palestine. Though he had once identified as a Zionist, his views shifted after visiting Nazi Germany in the 1930s, where he concluded that nationalism was inherently destructive and could not serve as a path to Jewish safety.

Lazaron was a founder and co-president of the American Council for Judaism. His anti-Zionist stance remained largely uncontroversial until after the Holocaust. Lazarus resigned as rabbi emeritus of Baltimore Hebrew Congregation in 1946. This followed his refusal to comply with a request from the synagogue's board of directors to refrain from criticizing Zionism in his sermons. Lazaron argued that Zionists had exploited the Holocaust to justify their cause and acknowledged the unpopularity of his views within Jewish communities. He noted that Zionists viewed him as a traitor because he had formerly been a Zionist but later left the movement and opposed it.

In 1934, Lazaron defended the use of Jewish quotas in American universities, expressing concern over what he perceived as an overrepresentation of Jewish students in the field of medicine. He argued that such overrepresentation might provoke antisemitism and advocated for diversifying Jewish academic pursuits. Lazaron conducted a survey of 65 medical schools, seeking feedback from their deans about Jewish students and their proportional representation. Responses from this survey were later included in the "Beyond Chicken Soup" traveling exhibit, displayed at the Jewish Museum of Maryland and other venues.

Lazaron was a member of the National Council of the American Friends of the Middle East and authored several books.

== Bibliography ==
- Ask the Rabbi, 1928
- Common Ground: A Plea for Intelligent Americanism, 1938
- Homeland or State: The Real Issue, 1940
- In the Shadow of Catastrophe, 1956
- Is This the Way?, 1942
- Olive Trees in a Storm, 1955
- Seed of Abraham: Ten Jews of the Ages, 1930
- Side Arms (Readings and Meditations for Soldiers and Sailors), 1918
- The Consolidation of Our Father, 1928
