= Norton Mezvinsky =

American historian (1932–2022)

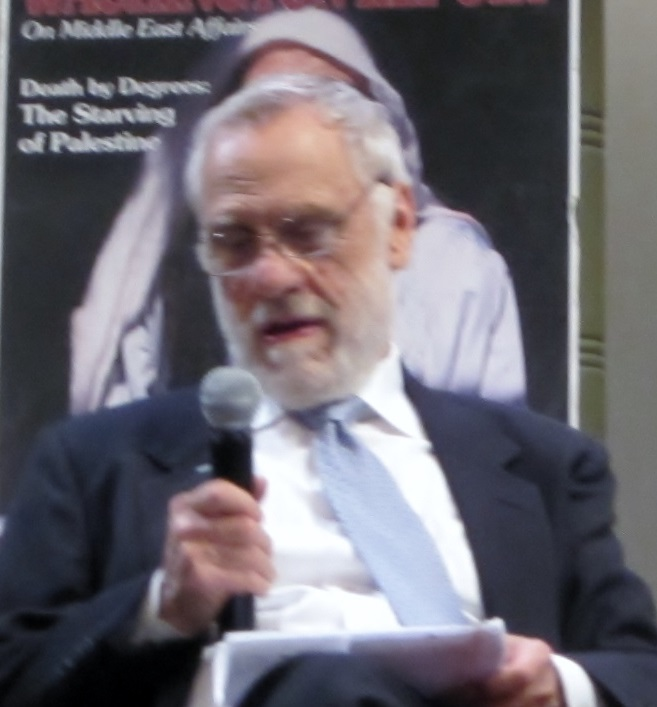
- Norton Mezvinsky speaks, March, 2012 in Washington, D.C.
- Born: November 29, 1932
- Died: September 16, 2022 (aged 89); New York City, New York, U.S.
- Education: University of Wisconsin, Madison (BA, PhD)
- Spouse: Shirley Lauro (divorced)
- Children: 1
- Relatives: Edward Mezvinsky (brother); Marc Mezvinsky (nephew)

Norton H. Mezvinsky (November 29, 1932 – September 16, 2022) was an American historian, professor, and author. He was a Distinguished University Professor, Emeritus, Central Connecticut State University, and was the president of the International Council for Middle East Studies, an academic think tank in Washington, D C He wrote numerous books, articles, and book reviews that addressed the Arab-Israeli conflict and Zionism.

== Personal life ==
Norton Mezvinsky was from a well-known Iowa family long involved in Jewish politics. His father, Abe, was for decades a grocer and leading businessman in Ames, Iowa, and was famous for his philanthropy. Norton studied history at Wisconsin University under George Mosse, Howard K. Beale, and William Appleman Williams. At the same time, he corresponded with rabbi Elmer Berger, with whom he was to work and come very close to. He completed his Ph.D. at the University of Wisconsin in 1960, while working on a sociological study on American Jewish Self-Segregation which the American Council for Judaism had commissioned. Mezvinsky also did post-doctoral studies at Harvard University.

Norton's brother, Edward Mezvinsky, was an Iowa state representative, a member of the United States House of Representatives, and the U.S. Representative to the United Nations Human Rights Committee in the 1970s. Edward was prosecuted for fraud, and spent time in prison many years later. Norton's nephew, Marc Mezvinsky, is married to Chelsea Clinton, the daughter of Hillary Clinton and Bill Clinton.

Mezvinsky was married to the playwright and novelist, Shirley Lauro, and has one daughter with her. There was apparently a second marriage because two issues of the Directory of Scholars in the Humanities, which, for those years, was available as a print edition only, list him as married well after the divorce from Lauro.

Norton Mezvinsky died on September 16, 2022, at the age of 89.

== Publications ==
Norton Mezvinsky specialized in U.S. history between 1877 and 1920, U.S. immigration history, the Arab-Israeli conflict, the history of Judaism, and terrorism in the post-modern world.

== Reception ==
Nathan Guttman, writing in The Forward, described Mezvinsky as "an academic known for his anti-Israel views...who has been labeled as anti-Zionist [and who] holds strong views questioning the right of Jews to a homeland in Israel".

== Books ==
- Disagreement in Definition: Three Views of the American Jewish Community in the Twentieth Century, University of Wisconsin–Madison, 1956.
- (With Uri Davis): Documents from Israel, 1967-73: Readings for a Critique of Zionism, Ithaca Press, 1975, ISBN 978-0-903729-09-3.
- (As co-editor and contributor): Anti-Zionism: Analytical Reflections, Amana Books, 1988, ISBN 978-0-915597-73-4.
- Report : Human Rights Violations During the Palestinian Uprising, 1988-1989, The Israeli League for Human and Civil Rights.
- (With Israel Shahak): Jewish Fundamentalism in Israel, Pluto Press, 2004, ISBN 978-0-7453-2091-5.
