= Brennan LaBrie =

American journalist

Brennan LaBrie (born September 21, 1999) is a journalist for Time for Kids. LaBrie is also the editor and publisher of the Spruce St. Weekly newspaper, which was first published February 2, 2008. In 2021, LaBrie won a Northwest Regional Emmy in the category of Long Form Non-Fiction for directing and lead writing on the documentary Eyes Above: Militarization of Sacred Land.

== See also ==
- Scholastic News Kids Press Corps
