= Shirley Lauro =

American writer

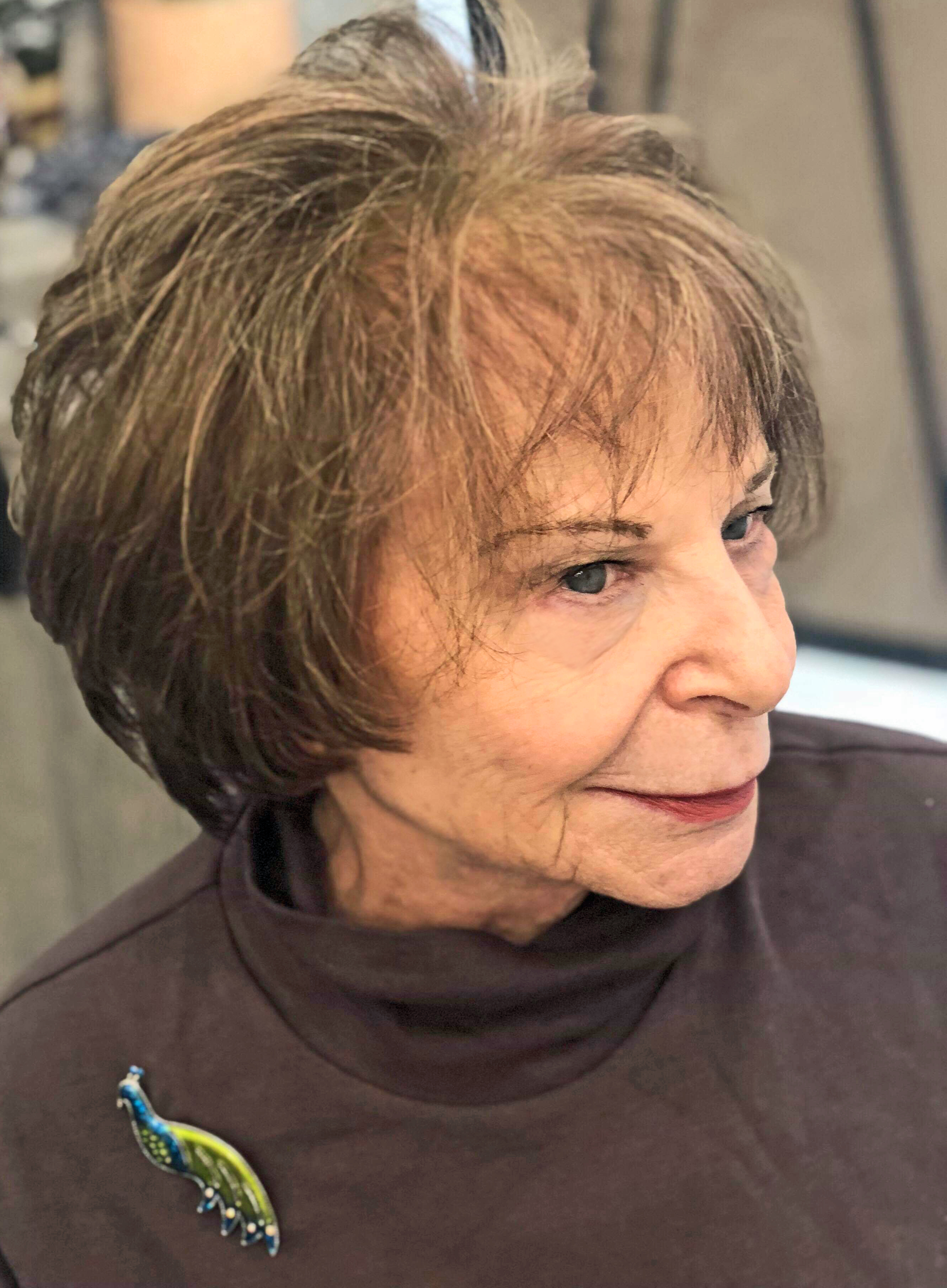
- Shirley Lauro
- Born: Shirley Shapiro; November 18, 1933 (age 92); Des Moines, Iowa, United States
- Education: Northwestern University; University of Wisconsin-Madison; Columbia University
- Occupations: Playwright, novelist, screenwriter
- Spouse: Norton Mezvinsky (divorced) Louis Lauro (died 2016)
- Writing career
- Notable awards: Guggenheim Fellow (1985)
- Website: www.shirleylauro.com

Shirley Shapiro Mezvinsky Lauro (née Shapiro) is an American playwright, screenwriter, and novelist. Her plays include A Piece of my Heart, Open Admissions, The Radiant, All Through the Night and others. Her novel is The Edge and she edited an anthology, Political Plays by American Women, with Alexis Greene.

== Biography ==
Lauro was born and raised in Des Moines, Iowa, United States, to Helen Davidson Shapiro and Phillip Shapiro. Her early works, such as The Contest and Sunday Go To Meetin' , were influenced by her family and the local community. She studied acting at the Preparatory Theatre program of Drake University in Des Moines, performing with their traveling children's theater group throughout Iowa. Ms. Lauro graduated cum laude from Northwestern University, Evanston, Illinois with a degree in theatre and speech. She received her master's degree from the University of Wisconsin, Madison in theatre/English where she studied fiction writing with Elizabeth Bowen and did post-graduate work at Columbia University in creative writing as well as at City University of New York where she studied dramatic criticism with Harold Clurman. She taught graduate playwriting among other courses at New York University, Yeshiva University, Hunter College, Hofstra University and City University of New York. Her experience at City University inspired Lauro's Tony-nominated Broadway Play, Open Admissions, which Lauro adapted for a CBS TV special. Lauro has a daughter, Andrea Mezvinsky, from her marriage to Norton Mezvinsky, Ph.D, which ended in divorce. In 1973 she married Louis Lauro, Ph.D. a psychoanalyst with whom she has two step-daughters, Linda Lauro-Lazin and Nancy Lauro. Shirley Lauro resides on the Upper West Side of New York.

== Works ==
Shirley’s best-known work, A Piece of My Heart, with over 2,000 productions around the world, was named by Vietnam Veterans of America: "The most enduring play in the nation on Vietnam". It was awarded the 2018 Moss Hart Memorial Award for a production by Wellesley Repertory Theatre.

Open Admissions, on Broadway, received one Tony Nomination, two Drama Desk nominations, a Theatre World Award and a Samuel French Award. It was a New York Times pick for "Ten Best Plays of the Year", received The Dramatists Guild’s Hull-Warriner Award and was adapted by Lauro for CBS, starring Jane Alexander and Estelle Parsons. In 2008 the play was honored by publication in Writing Through Literature, (by Anstendig and Hicks), where it joined works by Walt Whitman, Ionesco, Langston Hughes and Toni Cade Bambara in the book’s section, "The Lesson".

Shirley Lauro’s The Radiant enjoyed its World Premiere in March, 2011, at New Theatre, Miami, starring Angelica Torn as Marie Curie. The play was commissioned by The Sloan Science Foundation, receiving their Production Enhancement Grant, in addition to grants from The Dramatists Guild and TCG’s Edgerton Foundation (honored as one of 40 World Premieres by American Playwrights). The play marked its New York off-Broadway premiere in winter, 2013.

All Through The Night enjoyed its world premiere in Chicago, receiving a Jeff Nomination, as Best New Play of the Year. Its New York premiere was at Red Fern Theater, off-Broadway in 2010, followed by 2011 NYC revivals both at The Living Theater and Infinite Variety Productions. Other productions include Saskatchewan; Phoenix, AZ; Macon, GA; and ArtsWest, Seattle, WA.

Clarence Darrow's Last Trial had its world premiere at New Theatre in Miami, receiving a Carbonell nomination for Best New Play of the Year in Florida, and an NEA Access to Excellence Enhancement Grant. It was also an honoree for the New American Play Prize.

All Through the Night, Clarence Darrow's Last Trial and Speckled Birds were all published in 2010 by Samuel French, Inc., and honored by the Drama Bookshop in an evening, "Triple Play", composed of readings and a reception.

Front Lines: Political Plays By American Women, co-edited by Lauro was a 2009 Honoree: Coalition of Professional Women in Arts and Media.

The Contest was directed by Jerry Zaks for Philadelphia’s Annenberg Center and was published in 2000. It received the National Foundation for Jewish Culture Award.

Other works include The Coal Diamond (“The Best Short Play” Anthology); Nothing Immediate (OOBA Festival Winner); Railing It Uptown; Sunday Go To Meetin' . Lauro’s novel, The Edge, published here and in Great Britain, was a Literary Guild Choice.

Major Fellowships: The Guggenheim, three NEA’s, NY Foundation for the Arts.

Major Affiliations: a director of the Dramatists Guild Foundation; Playwrights/Directors Unit, The Actors Studio; League of Professional Theatre Women/NY; Ensemble Studio Theatre; PEN; Writer’s Guild, East; Author’s Guild.
