= Yinon Plan =

1982 political article published in Israel

The Yinon Plan is an article published in February 1982 in the Hebrew journal Kivunim ("Directions") entitled 'A Strategy for Israel in the 1980s'. The article was penned by Oded Yinon, reputedly a former advisor to Ariel Sharon, a former senior official with the Israeli Foreign Ministry and journalist for The Jerusalem Post.

It is cited as an early example of characterizing political projects in the Middle East in terms of a logic of sectarian divisions. It has played a role in both conflict resolution analysis by scholars who regard it as having influenced the formulation of policies adopted by the American administration under George W. Bush, and also in conspiracy theories according to which the article either predicted or planned major political events in the Middle East since the 1980s, including the 2003 invasion of Iraq and the overthrowing of Saddam Hussein, the Syrian Civil War and the rise of the Islamic State. Conspiracy theories further claim that the plan was introduced to the US by members of the Israeli Institute for Advanced Strategic and Political Studies in administration and that it was adopted by the Bush administration following 9/11 (claimed to be a Mossad false flag) with the goal of furthering US interests in the region, while simultaneously advancing the alleged Jewish dream of Greater Israel "from the Nile to the Euphrates".

Kivunim was a quarterly periodical dedicated to the study of Judaism and Zionism which appeared between 1978 and 1987, and was published by the World Zionist Organization's department of Information in Jerusalem.

== Argument of the paper ==
Yinon argues that the world was witnessing a new epoch in history without precedent, which required both the development of a fresh perspective and an operational strategy to implement it. The rationalist and humanist foundations of Western civilization were in a state of collapse. The West was disintegrating before the combined onslaught of the Soviet Union and the Third World, a phenomenon accompanied by an upsurge in antisemitism, all of which meant that Israel would become the last safe haven for Jews to seek refuge in. The Muslim Arab world circling Israel had been arbitrarily sliced up into 19 ethnically heterogeneous states by imperial powers, France and Great Britain, and was just a 'temporary house of cards put together by foreigners' - the notion that pan-Arabism was a house of cards doomed to collapse had been already argued by Fouad Ajami some years earlier - composed of mutually hostile ethnic minorities and majorities, that, once disintegrated into, in Ahmad's interpretation, feudal tribal fiefdoms, would no longer challenge Israel. Centrifugal factors would give rise to a dynamic of fragmentation that, while highly perilous, would offer Israel opportunities it had failed to exploit in 1967.

He then proceeds to analyze the weaknesses of Arab countries, by citing what he perceives to be flaws in their national and social structures, concluding that Israel should aim to bring about the fragmentation of the Arab world into a mosaic of ethnic and confessional groupings. 'Every kind of inter-Arab confrontation,' he argued, would prove to be advantageous to Israel in the short term. He saw contemporary events in Lebanon as a foreshadowing of future developments overall throughout the Arab world. The upheavals would create a precedent for guiding Israeli short-term and long-term strategies. Specifically, he asserted that the immediate aim of policy should be the dissolution of the military capabilities of Arab states east of Israel, while the primary long-term goal should work towards the formation of unique areas defined in terms of ethnonational and religious identities.

== Blueprint for the Middle East ==
=== Egypt ===
Yinon thought the 1978 Camp David Accords, the peace agreement signed by Menachem Begin and Anwar Sadat, to be mistaken. One of Israel's aims for the 1980s would be, Yinon claimed, the dismemberment of Egypt, a country he described as a "corpse", in order to reestablish the status quo ante, when Israel had controlled the Sinai Peninsula. Yinon hoped to see the formation of a Christian Coptic state on Egypt's northern borders. Yinon pinned the expectations on a rapid Israeli re-invasion of the Sinai triggered by a future rupture by Egypt of the American-brokered terms of peace, something which, under Hosni Mubarak, failed to eventuate.

=== Jordan and the West Bank ===
In his account of Russian foreign policy and the Arabs, Yevgeny Primakov contextualizes Yinon's paper in terms of the content of what former United States Ambassador to the United Nations, George Ball, stated in testimony in August before the U.S. Senate's Foreign Affairs Committee. Ball, discussing the second Israeli invasion of Lebanon earlier in June, referred to conversations with Ariel Sharon, in which Sharon reportedly stated that his long-term strategy consisted of "squeezing the Palestinians out of the West Bank..allowing only enough of them to remain for work." Yinon's paper suggested that Israeli policy, both in war and peace, should aim for one objective: 'the liquidation of Jordan' as ruled by the Hashemite Kingdom, together with increased Palestinian migration from the West Bank into eastern Jordan. The dissolution of Jordan, Yinon thought, would bring an end to the problem of the existence of dense concentrations of Palestinians in the Palestinian territories Israel had conquered in the Six-Day War in 1967, allowing them to be spirited away into that former kingdom's territory.

=== Lebanon ===
Yinon's paper fed an old Lebanese conspiracy theory against its territorial integrity going back to 1943, according to which the country was to be cantonized along ethno-nationalist lines. In particular during the 1970s the idea took wing and, especially after civil war broke out in Lebanon in 1975, came to be associated with the figure of Henry Kissinger whose Middle East diplomacy was thought to be greatly detrimental to Lebanese interests, and who was rumoured to be planning the partition of Lebanon into two states.

=== Iraq ===
Yinon considered Iraq, with its oil wealth, to be Israel's greatest threat. He believed that the Iran–Iraq War would split up Iraq, whose dissolution should be a strategic Israeli aim, and he envisaged the emergence of three ethnic centres, of Shiites governing from Basra, the Sunni from Baghdad, and the Kurds with a capital in Mosul, each area run along the lines of the administrative divisions of the former Ottoman Empire.

== Reactions ==
=== Contemporary reception ===
An English translation by Israel Shahak soon appeared in the Journal of Palestine Studies. Israel Shahak in the foreword to his translation interpreted the plan as both a fantasy and a faithful reflection of the strategy being developed by Ariel Sharon and Rafael Eitan, and drew parallels with both the geopolitical ideas that flourished in Germany from 1890 to 1933, later adopted by Hitler and applied to Eastern Europe, and modern American neoconservative thinking, which influenced Yinon, to gather from the sources cited in his notes. It was, it has been argued, Shahak's English translation which catapulted Yinon into the public limelight.

According to William Haddad, the publication of the article caused a sensation at the time. Haddad notes that the American syndicated columnist Joseph Kraft, a month later, echoed Yinon's ideas in an article that Syria would implode into confessional fragments composed of Alawite, Druze and Sunni communities were the country to be occupied after an Israeli invasion, and that such an event should cause reverberations throughout the Arab world, resulting in a reconfiguration of ethnic microstates guaranteed to introduce an era of peace. The idea was dismissed at the time. Yinon's article drew several other responses, and was reviewed in Newsweek (26 July 1982, p. 32) and the Wall Street Journal (8 December 1982, p. 34). Amos Elon reviewed the essay for Haaretz and worried that American commentators on Israel were turning a blind eye to the kind of irrational attitudes evinced by Yinon's article. Those who did point out such tendencies within Israeli politics were subjected to defamation. David Waines, reviewing the essay for the International Journal of Middle East Studies, contextualized it in terms of two other works appearing in the same year as Yinon's essay, a collection edited by Ibrahim Abu-Lughod and a book by Michael J. Cohen on American, British and Zionist long-term regional policies, both arguing such policies were dictated solely by a realpolitik insouciant of Palestinian grievances. In the light of the immediate instance of Israel's invasion of Lebanon in that same year, Waines concluded that all three pieces created a 'grave apprehension about present and future developments in the Middle East.'

An article published in 1983 on the monthly publication of the Socialist Organisation in Israel, Matzpen, claimed the article exposes the minds behind Israel's foreign policy. To such claims, Yinon responded in an interview to the anti-establishment, weekly newspaper "HaOlam HaZeh", claiming he is not a fan or a friend of Israel's leaders at the time, including Ariel Sharon and Menachem Begin, nor does he supports them. Yinon also claimed that an article, similar to his, was published in a left-wing newspaper of the Kibbutz Movement Mi'Befnim.

The French philosopher, convert to Islam, and Holocaust denier, Roger Garaudy, who was married to a Palestinian woman, used the text the following year in the English version of his book, L'Affaire Israël: le sionisme politique, to support his argument that a mechanism was in place to drive Arabs out of what was defined as Eretz Israel and disintegrate Arab countries. Jordan's Prince Hassan bin Talal outlined its contents in a book on peace prospects, in 1984, as did Christine Moss Helms in a Brookings Institution study.

=== Later interpretations ===
Yehoshafat Harkabi appraised Yinon's analysis of the weakness of Arab states as generally correct while expressing doubts about the suggestion Israel should actively work towards their dissolution. If their fragmentation is inevitable, he asked, why would it be necessary for Israel to interfere? Ralph Schoenman argued that its divide et īmpera principle followed 'the time-honoured imperial pattern'.

Mordechai Nisan, like Haddad, notes that it made waves, stirring both curiosity and wrath, the latter since it fed into regional suspicions that Israel was intent on "balkanizing" the neighbourhood. Nisan thought the regional outcry both exaggerated and incredulous: Yinon's apparent suggestion that Israel adopt an interventionist role to abet the fragmentation of Arab states the author thought inevitable, he added, served to create an impression that Israel was engaged in a sinister plot, when the views expressed were Yinon's alone, and did not represent Israeli government policy.

Ilan Peleg described it as 'an authentic mirror of the thinking mode of the Israeli Right at the height of Begin's rule.' Noam Chomsky made a more nuanced analysis of the historical context: the views espoused by Yinon were to be dissociated from the official Zionist mainstream outlook of that time, in embodying 'ideological and geopolitical fantasies' that could be identified with the line developed by the ultranationalist Tehiya political party, created in 1979. Nonetheless, an argument could be made, he continues, that part of the mainstream of Labour Zionism in his view had entertained similar ideas. Chomsky cites in support of this David Ben-Gurion's strategy when the State of Israel was founded of crushing Syria and the Transjordan, annexing southern Lebanon while leaving its northern residue to Maronite Christians, and bombing Egypt if it were to put up resistance. Chomsky warned against complacency about these fringe ideas since, he argued: '(t)he entire history of Zionism and later that of Israel, particularly since 1967, is one of gradual shift towards the positions of those formerly regarded as right-wing extremists.'

Virginia Tilley argues that there was a strong tension between the US as a global hegemon relying on strong regional state systems, and Israel's interests in a weak state system in the Middle East beyond its borders on the other hand. In this context she cites Yinon's views as spelling out the latter logic, but specifies that they were not quite unique at that time, since Ze'ev Schiff writing in Haaretz in the same month, 5 February 1982, had asserted that Israel's geostrategic interests would be best served by the fragmentation of Iraq, for example, into a tripartite entity consisting of Shiite and Sunni states hived off from a northern Kurdish reality.

Linda S. Heard, writing for Arab News in 2005, reviewed recent policies under George W. Bush such as the war on terror, and events in the Middle East from the Iran–Iraq War to the Invasion of Iraq in 2003, and concluded:

There is one thing that we do know. Oded Yinon's 1982 "Zionist Plan for the Middle East" is in large part taking shape. Is this pure coincidence? Was Yinon a gifted psychic? Perhaps! Alternatively, we in the West are victims of a long-held agenda not of our making and without doubt not in our interests.

In 2017, Ted Becker, former Walter Meyer Professor of Law at New York University and Brian Polkinghorn, distinguished professor of Conflict Analysis and Dispute Resolution at Salisbury University, argued that Yinon's plan was adopted and refined in a 1996 policy document entitled A Clean Break: A New Strategy for Securing the Realm, written by a research group at the Israeli-affiliated Institute for Advanced Strategic and Political Studies in Washington. The group was directed by Richard Perle, who, some years later, became one of the key figures in the formulation of the Iraq War strategy adopted during the administration of George W. Bush in 2003.

Both Becker and Polkinhorn admit that avowed enemies of Israel in the Middle East take the sequence of events—Israel's occupation of the West Bank, the Golan Heights, its encirclement of Gaza, the invasion of Lebanon, its bombing of Iraq, airstrikes in Syria and its attempts at containing Iran's nuclear capacities—when read in the light of the Yinon Plan and the Clean break analysis, to be proof that Israel is engaged in a modern version of The Great Game, with the backing of Zionist currents in the American neoconservative and Christian fundamentalist movements. They also conclude that Likud Party appears to have implemented both plans.

== See also ==
- Alliance of the periphery
