= Khalid Latif (imam) =

American chaplain (born 1982)

Director and Co-founder of the Islamic Center of New York City
- Incumbent
- Assumed office 2025

Personal details
- Born: October 18, 1982 (age 44) Edison, New Jersey, U.S.
- Education: New York University (B.A. Political Science, Middle Eastern and Islamic Studies); Hartford Seminary Graduate Education
- Profession: Imam, professor, public speaker

Khalid Latif (born October 18, 1982) is the current Director and Co-founder of the Islamic Center of New York City (ICNYC). He previously held the position of Executive Director and Chaplain (Imam) of the Islamic Center at New York University (NYU).

== Chaplaincy ==
=== NYPD ===
In 2007, Mayor Michael Bloomberg nominated Latif to become the youngest chaplain in history of the New York City Police Department when he was 24 years old. Latif has developed skills as a spokesperson for co-existence, mutual understanding, and productive relationships between cultures, communities, and religions.

=== NYU ===
In 2005, Latif was appointed the first Muslim chaplain at NYU. In 2006, Latif was appointed the first Muslim chaplain at Princeton University. In 2007, Latif’s position was fully institutionalized at New York University, and so he committed himself to that institution and the building of a Muslim life institution. After almost 20 year of service to the NYU community, Imam Latif decided to step down as director and assume his new position as Director at ICNYC.

=== ICNYC ===
Imam Khalid Latif left the Islamic Center of New York University (ICNYU) on August 15, 2025. He departed after 20 years to focus on leading the newly established Islamic Center of New York City. A "Farewelcome Celebration" was held at Webster Hall to mark both the farewell to ICNYU and his new beginning.

Islamic Center of New York City (ICNYC) is open as of September 2025. ICNYC is a brand-new development in Greenwich Village. A two story commercial unit with over 16,000 square feet of usable space, it is located at the intersection of 6th Ave and Washington Place.

== Miscellaneous ==
Latif has offered his experience to the U.S. State Department, various institutions, corporations, mosques, and other communities in the United States, Canada, Denmark, the Netherlands, Spain, and Egypt. He has been invited to speak at the University of Alabama-Birmingham, Yeshiva University, St. John's University, the University of Pennsylvania, the University of California-Davis, University of California-Berkeley, Columbia University, Princeton University, The University of Illinois (Urbana-Champaign), Ohio State University and Harvard University. Latif has been quoted or otherwise featured in The Guardian and GEO TV. Latif was named one of the 500 most influential Muslims in the world in 2010 by Georgetown University's Prince Alwaleed Center for Muslim–Christian Understanding and The Royal Islamic Strategic Studies Centre.

In 2009, Latif was a runner-up in the FaithTrust Institute's National Sermon Contest for his sermon "Real Men Don't Hit Women".

Latif is one of the principal subjects of Chelsea Clinton's 2014 documentary film "Of Many".

Since 2010, Latif has run a daily blog for the HuffPost Religion during the Islamic holy month of Ramadan, in 2011 winning the Brass Crescent Award. He was named to the 2012 Christian Science Monitor's "30 under 30" list. In 2014, Latif was honored with the NYU Alumni Distinguished Service Award for his continued work to help bridge gaps between different faith groups. He formerly owned Honest Chops.
