= Elmer Berger (rabbi) =

American Reform rabbi (1908–1996)

Elmer Berger (May 27, 1908 – October 5, 1996) was a Jewish Reform rabbi widely known for his anti-Zionism. He was the executive director of the American Council for Judaism from its founding in 1942 until 1955. Following this period, he continued his involvement with the organization as a consultant until 1968, when he was forced to resign. He subsequently established American Jewish Alternatives to Zionism.

== Family and early life ==
Berger was born in Cleveland, Ohio, to a Hungarian-born railroad engineer and a third-generation German-American Jewish mother from Texas. During his childhood, his family attended the Euclid Avenue Temple (Anshe Chesed Congregation), where Rabbi Louis Wolsey encouraged him to pursue a career in the rabbinate.

After graduating Phi Beta Kappa from the University of Cincinnati, Berger was ordained by Hebrew Union College in 1932. He began his career in the ministry in Pontiac, Michigan, before taking a position in Flint, Michigan, where he served from 1936 to 1942.

Berger married Seville Schwartz, the sister of one of his classmates at Hebrew Union College, on September 3, 1931. The couple divorced in 1946. Shortly thereafter, he married Ruth Winegarden, the daughter of a prominent Flint-based furniture manufacturer and a member of the Flint congregation. The couple remained married until Ruth's death in 1979.

== Political activism ==
Berger was a leading figure in the American Jewish anti-Zionist movement. He was a staunch opponent of the Columbus Platform of 1937, which marked a shift within the Reform Jewish movement away from its original anti-Zionist stance and rejection of traditional Jewish ritual. In 1942, Berger's mentor, Rabbi Louis Wolsey, co-founded the American Council for Judaism (ACJ) and appointed Berger as its first executive director, a position he held until 1955.

Berger became a prominent figure in the Council’s opposition to the Biltmore Conference of 1942, which formalized Zionist goals for a Jewish state in Palestine. His 1945 book, The Jewish Dilemma, argued against Zionism, asserting that it embraced racial myths about Jewish identity. He advocated for Jewish assimilation, believing that integration into broader society, rather than nationalism, was the most viable path for Jewish survival.

In The Jewish Dilemma, Berger also expressed support for the Soviet Union, which he viewed as a model for Jewish emancipation. He wrote, “The Jews of the Soviet have enjoyed equality of status and opportunity for only about a quarter of a century. They are the most recently emancipated Jews in the world... Freedom and integration and emancipation flow now through the veins of the Jews.” Berger contended that the Russian Revolution had eliminated the need for Zionism, stating that Soviet Jews no longer required a refuge.

Berger and the ACJ faced growing opposition after The Holocaust, the establishment of the State of Israel in 1948, and an increasing popularity of Zionism among American Jews and Jewish institutions. Louis Wolsey resigned from the ACJ in 1945. Murray Polner wrote that the majority of American Jews viewed the ACJ as indifferent or hostile to Holocaust survivors who moved to Israel. Berger's political views earned him admiration in Arab countries.

In 1955, Berger proposed reforms aimed at integrating Jewish practices into American cultural life, such as shifting the Jewish Sabbath from Saturday to Sunday, redesigning the menorah to symbolize American Jewish values, and reinterpreting Sukkot "to be broadened to take on meaning to [all] citizens of an industrial society."

In 1965, Beger drew criticism for an interview with the far-right German newspaper National Zeitung, where he sharply criticized leaders of major Zionist and Jewish organizations.

The Six-Day War in 1967 intensified Berger's opposition to Zionism. He publicly criticized Israel’s actions during the conflict, which led to criticism from Zionists, including members of the ACJ. In a July 1967 interview, Berger named six prominent Jews—Donald S. Klopfer, Stanley Marcus, John Mosler (chairman of the Mosler Safe Company), Walter N. Rothschild Jr. (president of Abraham & Strauss), Stanley Marcus, Joseph H. Louchheim (deputy commissioner for the New York State Department of Welfare’s New York City division), and Henry Loeb of Loeb, Rhoades & Co.—as supporting his position. All except Loeb refuted Berger’s claims, and three of them subsequently resigned from the ACJ.

In 1968, upon resigning as the ACJ's executive director, Norton Mezvinsky claimed that Berger had assisted Arab envoys at the United Nations with speechwriting, specifically naming George Tomeh of Syria. Berger resigned from the ACJ later that year.

== Later life ==
In 1968, following his departure from the ACJ, Berger founded American Jewish Alternatives to Zionism (AJAZ), which served as a platform for Berger to continue publishing his writings and delivering lectures during his semi-retirement. In his later years, he divided his time between New York City and Sarasota, Florida. He collaborated with the Washington Report on Middle East Affairs and mentored Norton Mezvinsky.

Berger died in Sarasota in 1996 from lung cancer at the age of 88. Mezvinsky wrote a detailed obituary that concluded:

"Throughout his adult life Elmer Berger's definition of Judaism did not vary. In the introduction to his book A Partisan History of Judaism he wrote: "There are those who see Judaism as 'the religion of the Jewish People.' This book will not please them. For it indicates, unmistakably, that the origins of Judaism were not in 'the Jewish people' and that the best and finest of Judaism today transcends the Jewish people." At the end of this same book, Elmer Berger succinctly gave his definition: "Judaism is to do justice and to have mercy and to walk humbly with God; and all the rest is commentary and of secondary importance." It was from this perspective that Elmer Berger carefully and specifically documented his case against Zionism and against the oppressive character of the Zionist state. He called upon the state of Israel to de-Zionize, i.e. to cease being an exclusivist Jewish state granting by law rights and privileges to Jews not granted to non-Jews. He beseeched the state of Israel to develop as a truly democratic state, to be just and merciful to all people and thus to walk humbly with God.
Elmer Berger was a Jewish patriot".

In 2011, Jack Ross published a biography titled Rabbi Outcast: Elmer Berger and American Jewish Anti-Zionism. According to the ACJ, the book places liberal Jewish anti-Zionism in historical perspective. Lawrence Grossman, editor of the American Jewish Year Book, criticized the work.

== Bibliography (partial) ==
- Elmer Berger: The Jewish Dilemma: The Case Against Zionist Nationalism, Devin-Adair, New York, 1945
- Elmer Berger: A Partisan History of Judaism: The Jewish Case Against Zionism, Devin-Adair, New York, 1951
- Elmer Berger: Who Knows Better Must Say So! American Council for Judaism, New York, 1955
- Elmer Berger: Judaism or Jewish Nationalism: The Alternative to Zionism, Bookman Associates, 1957
- Elmer Berger: Israel's Threat to Judaism: A speech delivered to the Irish Arab Society, Dublin, 5 February 1970
- Elmer Berger: Letters and Non-Letters: The White House, Zionism and Israel, Institute for Palestine Studies, Beirut, 1972.
- Elmer Berger: Memoirs of an Anti-Zionist Jew. Institute for Palestine Studies, Beirut, 1978.
- Deane A. Tack, Elmer Berger: Thorns of Resistance, Destra Publishers, 1993 ISBN 0-9635982-0-1
- Elmer Berger: Peace for Palestine: First Lost Opportunity, University Press of Florida Gainesville, FL 1993 ISBN 0-8130-1207-4

== See also ==
- Anti-Zionism
- Haredim and Zionism
- Neturei Karta
- World Agudath Israel
