= Eaglevale Partners =

Investment fund

Eaglevale Partners was a Manhattan-based, traditional, multi-strategy investment fund focused on currencies, commodities, and bonds. It was founded in 2011 by three former Goldman Sachs colleagues. In 2014, Eaglevale Partners opened a small Greek-focused fund, Eaglevale Hellenic Opportunity, during a tumultuous time in the Greek economy. In May 2016, The New York Times reported that Eaglevale was closing the Hellenic fund after it lost 90% of its value. The firm was managing $330 million at the time, and new investors were expected to invest a minimum of $2 million.

Eaglevale Partners closed in December 2016.
