= Scholastic News Kids Press Corps =

US news organization for children

The Scholastic News Kids Press Corps is a U.S. news organization for kids. The organization is made up of more than 30 kid reporters from around the world who report on breaking news and current events. The program was founded during the 2000 presidential campaign by Suzanne Freeman. Kid reporters across the U.S. interviewed presidential candidates and covered the election up until the inauguration, bringing news of the campaign trail to readers of Scholastic classroom magazines.

Since then, Scholastic News Kid Reporters have interviewed President Barack Obama, First Lady Michelle Obama, former Presidents George W. Bush and Bill Clinton, Vice President Joe Biden, Interior Secretary Sally Jewell, choreographer Jacques d'Amboise, entertainer Nick Cannon, director Ava DuVernay, presidential hopefuls Jeb Bush and Carly Fiorina, authors Walter Isaacson, Robert Beatty, and Sonia Manzano, and physicists Brian Greene and Kip Thorne, among other notable people.

== Kid Reporters ==
The Kids Press Corps consists of more than 30 kid reporters covering events in the U.S. and around the world. Every October, the organization accepts new applicants as kid reporters. During the year, the reporters cover local and national events. Their articles are published on Scholastic News Online and in Scholastic classroom magazines.

== Election Coverage ==
Scholastic News Kid Reporters have covered five United States presidential elections, in 2000, 2004, 2008, 2012 and 2016.

Each election year, kid reporters have interviewed presidential candidates and reported on primaries and caucuses, Democratic and Republican National Conventions, Election Day, and the Inauguration. Apart from presidential elections, kid reporters have also done extensive coverage of Midterm Elections and interviewed dozens of U.S. Senators, U.S. Representatives, and Governors. In 2013, Scholastic reporters interviewed Catholic Bishops and Cardinals about the papal conclave that elected Pope Francis.

== Scholastic Student Vote ==
Each election year since 1940, Scholastic has administered the Scholastic Student Vote, a national mock presidential election. The results of the Student Vote have been correct in all but three elections, 1948 (Truman vs. Dewey), 1960 (Kennedy vs. Nixon) and 2016 (Clinton vs. Trump). At the end of the Student Vote, kid reporters have announced the results to the nation on the NBC Today Show in New York City. During the 2012 election, nearly a quarter of a million students participated, the majority voting for Barack Obama.

== Tips from the Pros ==
Kid reporters have also interviewed many other journalists. Professional reporters and anchors who have been interviewed include Matt Lauer, Lester Holt, Robin Roberts (newscaster), Andrea Mitchell, Chuck Todd, Mike Lupica, Bob Costas, and Jose Diaz-Balart.

== Editors ==
Suzanne Freeman stayed as Editor for the Kids Press Corps until 2010. From 2010 until 2013, Dante Ciampaglia served as Editor. Since 2014, Suzanne McCabe has served as Editor. The Scholastic News Kids Press Corps is based in the headquarters of the Scholastic Corporation in New York City.

== Awards and recognition ==
In 2012, the Kids Press Corps won a New Media Award as the "Best in Industry" in the category of News for Kids.

Kid reporters have been recognized locally and nationally in newspapers and magazines and on television and radio. Kid reporters from Scholastic have appeared on the NBC Today Show, CNN, Fox News, MSNBC, and local television stations around the nation.
