= American Council for Judaism =

Jewish religious organization in the United States

- Established: 2 November 1942 (84 years ago)
- Types: organization
- Country: United States
- Chairpersons: Rabbi Andrue Kahn
- Website: www.acjna.org

The American Council for Judaism (ACJ) is an American Jewish anti-Zionist organization. The ACJ was founded in 1942 as a Classical Reform Jewish group, drawing on the principles outlined in the 1885 Pittsburgh Platform.

In 2024, the ACJ reconstituted its board of directors. Rabbi Andrue Kahn was appointed as the organization’s Rabbinic Executive Director.

== Background and early history ==
=== Early Reform anti-Zionism ===
Before World War I, leading rabbis within Reform Judaism opposed Zionism, emphasizing freedom, democracy, and equal rights for Jews within their countries of residence. The American Jewish Committee opposed Zionism until 1918, when it adopted a non-Zionist stance that continued until the Six-Day War in 1967. In 1937, the Central Conference of American Rabbis declared official neutrality on the question of Zionism.

=== Early years ===
In 1942, a division within the Reform movement emerged following a resolution by some rabbis supporting the creation of a "Jewish Army" in Palestine to fight with the Allies in World War II. The American and British general staffs opposed placing Jews in segregated units. Several Reform rabbis—including six former presidents of the Central Conference of American Rabbis and the president of Hebrew Union College—viewing such segregation as regressive and concerned with the Zionist political direction within their movement after the Biltmore Conference in May 1942, established the American Council for Judaism (ACJ) in June 1942. Founders included Louis Wolsey, Morris Lazaron, Abraham Cronbach, David Philipson, Henry Cohen, David Lefkowitz, and lay leaders. Elmer Berger became the Council’s executive director and principal spokesperson.

The ACJ opposed political Zionism and defined itself as anti-nationalist, promoting a universalist interpretation of Jewish identity. Its statement of principles supported the economic and cultural "rehabilitation" of Palestine and rejected Jewish statehood. The Council argued that Jewish nationalism risked confusing Jews’ place in society and detracting from Judaism’s religious mission.

During World War II, the ACJ opposed the creation of the Jewish Brigade by the British Army in 1944, petitioning American officials to reject the unit’s designation as a Jewish brigade. While it protested the British White Paper of 1939 for restricting Jewish immigration to Palestine, it also opposed Zionism and instead urged policies promoting equal rights for Jews globally. The ACJ advocated for a democratic government in Palestine with equal representation for Jews, Muslims, and Christians.

By 1946, the ACJ had numerous local chapters throughout the United States and regional offices in Richmond, Chicago, Dallas, and San Francisco. Support for the American Council for Judaism came primarily from Jews of British, Dutch, French and German descent who were historically attached to Classical Reform Judaism, but also from many Jewish socialists who opposed Zionism, and many more who were uncomfortable with religious Judaism coalesced around William Zukerman and his Jewish Newsletter.

Notable members and associates included David Riesman, Hans Kohn, Erich Fromm, Hannah Arendt, Will Herberg, Morrie Ryskind, Frank Chodorov, and Murray Rothbard. Among its non-Jewish supporters were Dorothy Thompson, Norman Thomas, Freda Utley, Arnold J. Toynbee, and Dwight Macdonald. The ACJ was particularly influential in San Francisco, Philadelphia, Houston, Chicago, Baltimore, Washington, D.C., Atlanta, and Dallas.

== Postwar anti-Zionist campaign ==
Following World War II, with the question of Palestine's future being considered, the ACJ continued to support a joint Jewish–Arab state rather than a Jewish state in Palestine, and opposed dispossessing the Arabs who were then living in Palestine. The presidency of the ACJ was accepted by the well-known philanthropist Lessing J. Rosenwald, who took the lead in urging the creation of a unitary democratic state in Mandatory Palestine in American policy-making circles. Rosenwald testified before the Anglo-American Committee of Inquiry in 1946, urged the creation of a unitary Jewish–Arab state in Palestine, and allowing Jewish immigration to Palestine to continue only upon "renunciation of the claim that Jews possess unlimited national right to the land, and that the country shall take the form of a racial or theocratic state," and said that the United States and other UN member states should allow more Jewish immigration to solve the European–Jewish refugee problem. It later endorsed the Committee of Inquiry's recommendations, including that Palestine become neither a Jewish or Arab state and the admittance of 100,000 Jewish refugees into Palestine. In addition, it opposed the establishment of a Jewish state anywhere else in the world, not just in Palestine. The ACJ's official position was that European Jews should be rehabilitated by restoring their civil, political, and economic security. To demonstrate that American Zionists did not represent the views of American Jewry, the ACJ sent anti-Zionist letters to various government officials.

=== Terrorism and illegal immigration to Palestine ===
During the Jewish insurgency, a campaign against the British forces led by Jewish underground groups in Mandatory Palestine (the Haganah, Irgun, and Lehi), the ACJ opposed what it viewed as Jewish terrorism. Following the King David Hotel bombing, it issued a statement calling for American Jews to "repudiate the perpetrators of those outrages and those leaders of Jews, in and out of Palestine, whose incitement is equally responsible."

In a statement, Lessing Rosenwald called for the American–Jewish community to condition any further assistance to the Yishuv (Palestinian Jewry) on the end of violence. It also opposed the Haganah's Aliyah Bet program, which attempted to bring Jewish refugees into Palestine illegally past a British blockade. Following a statement by the vice-president of the Zionist Organization of America that American Jews were prepared to spend millions of dollars to finance illegal immigration to Palestine, Rosenwald repudiated him, calling Aliyah Bet a "shocking disregard for law and order" and stating "lawlessness even in the name of mercy cannot be tolerated."

In the final year before the foundation of the State of Israel in 1948, the ACJ became very close to the San Francisco-born Reform rabbi Judah Leon Magnes, a humanitarian activist and first chancellor of the Hebrew University of Jerusalem (1925), and the leading Jewish advocate for a binational Jewish-Arab state in Palestine, who was forced to return to the United States. In 1948, the ACJ had 14,000 members.

=== After 1948 ===
The creation of the State of Israel in 1948 led to internal conflict within the ACJ. After the State of Israel declared independence, the ACJ continued its anti-Zionist campaign, leading to the resignation of several prominent Reform rabbis, including its founder, Louis Wolsey, who called on the ACJ to dissolve itself since the Zionist movement had succeeded. In a speech to his congregation, Wolsey said that "I believe we should support the present reality of a land of Israel, with all our strength." The ACJ responded by stating that "we shall continue to seek the integration of Jews into American life. We are convinced that this necessary integration cannot be accomplished as members of a separatistic national group with national interests in a foreign state." Its position was that to American Jews, Israel was not the state or homeland of the Jewish people, but merely a foreign country. In December 1948, Lessing Rosenwald urged that the US condition friendship with Israel on Israel building an inclusive Israeli nationalism confined to its own borders and inclusive of its Muslim and Christian citizens rather than Jewish nationalism. Murray Polner, a historian of Judaism in the United States, wrote that "by 1948, with the establishment of an independent Israel, the council had earned the enmity of the vast majority of American Jewry, who viewed the group as indifferent, if not hostile, to Jews who had lived through the Holocaust and had nowhere to go."

The ACJ switched its focus to battling what it viewed as its primary foe—the political influence of Zionism upon American Jewry. In addition to supporting a network of religious schools committed to Classical Reform Judaism, the Council fought American-Jewish fundraising for Israel and agitated against the merging of Zionist fund-raising organizations with local Jewish community boards, provided financial aid to Jews emigrating from Israel and to Palestinian refugees, and enjoyed friendly relations with the Eisenhower State Department under John Foster Dulles. The ACJ also vocally supported the efforts of William Fulbright to have the lobbyists for Israel in the United States legally registered as foreign agents. In 1955, the ACJ's head, Elmer Berger, advocated the complete assimilation of Jews into American life by switching the Jewish Sabbath from Saturday to Sunday, creating a new menorah to "reflect the appreciation of American Jews of the freedom of life in the United States," and for the interpretation of the holiday of Sukkot "to be broadened to take on meaning to [all] citizens of an industrial society."

In 1957, the Union of American Hebrew Congregations (now known as the Union for Reform Judaism), denounced the American Council for Judaism. In a statement, the UAHC alleged that the ACJ misrepresented classical Reform Judaism, undermined the unity of the Reform movement, questioned the national loyalty of Jews who supported Zionism, aided antisemites, and "played directly into the hands of Arab propagandists".

== Decline ==
The ACJ rapidly declined in both political activity and influence following the Six-Day War in 1967, when the American Jewish community overwhelmingly supported Israel, and moderates within the Council forced Elmer Berger to resign the following year for declaring that Israel had been the primary aggressor in the war.

In 1968, Norton Mezvinksy stepped down as executive director of the ACJ and accused the organization of lacking empathy for Mizrahi Jews, as well as anti-Black racism.

The council continued to support progressive Judaism, but its views became less popular with American Jewry, and as a result it shrank. According to The New York Times, it was effectively "consigned to irrelevancy." In 2010, its mailing list was only a few thousand.

The ACJ later moderated its views on the state of Israel, but did not view it as a universal Jewish homeland, and advocates equal rights and religious freedom for all people living there. According to its former statement of principles, "the State of Israel has significance for the Jewish experience. As a refuge for many Jews who have suffered persecution and oppression in other places, Israel certainly has meaning for us. However, that relationship is a spiritual, historical, and humanitarian one—it is not a political tie. As American Jews, we share the hope for the security and well being of the State of Israel, living in peace and justice with its neighbors". Allan C. Brownfeld, the editor of the ACJ's magazine, who strongly criticized Israel in the Washington Report on Middle Easts Affairs (WRMEA), said that "I think we represent a silent majority. We are Americans by nationality and Jews by religion. And while we wish Israel well, we don't view it as our homeland." The council sought "to advance the universal principles of a Judaism free of nationalism, and the national, civic, cultural, and social integration into American institutions of Americans of Jewish faith."

=== Issues magazine ===
The organization published a magazine called Issues, which was published in print and online.

== Revival ==
In 2024, amidst the Gaza War, the Council reconstituted its board with new leadership, appointing Rabbi Andrue Kahn as Rabbinic Executive Director. Its board of directors includes Stephen Naman (President), Sarah Perlmeter (Vice President and Treasurer), and Miriam Eisenstat (Secretary).
