= Institute of Peruvian Studies =

Research institution in Lima, Peru

- Instituto de Estudios Peruanos
- Formation: February 7, 1964; 62 years ago
- Type: Think tank
- Headquarters: Av Horacio Urteaga 694, Jesús María 15072
- Location: Lima, Peru
- Staff: 84 (2024)
- Website: iep.org.pe

The Institute of Peruvian Studies (IEP) (Spanish: Instituto de Estudios Peruanos) is a non-profit think tank focused on social sciences that is based in Peru. IEP's mission includes gathering researchers to focus on improving development in Peru and Latin America by studying economic inequality, Peruvian history, political power and public policy. As a publisher, it is a producer of around 30 books annually. According to a 2021 Ipsos poll, the IEP is recognized as the premier think tank in Peru, being seen as the most influential with public policy.

== History ==
=== 20th century ===
==== 1960s: Founding and agrarian reform ====
On 7 February 1964, the Institute of Peruvian Studies (IEP) was founded by national and international academics seeking to perform research on social sciences in Peru. Founders of the IEP were members of the Progressive Social Movement, with José Matos Mar being the main founder who served as the IEP's director from 1965 to 1984. In late 1964, the IEP partnered with the New York State School of Industrial and Labor Relations of Cornell University, receiving funding from the university while collaborating on agricultural reform. By March 1965, the National Science Foundation (NSF) began providing funding to the institute while Advanced Research Projects Agency (ARPA) provided Cornell University funding for its studies in Peru. After information of Project Camelot in Chile leaked in 1965, the IEP faced scrutiny in the media for having a leftist political position while its collaborators from Cornell University received funding from the United States Department of Defense, with the ARPA funding being returned in February 1966. Further funding was then provided by the NSF and the National Institute of Mental Health. Beginning in 1968, the IEP began publishing the Peru Problema series to focus on social issues facing the nation. In 1969, the IEP made proposals for the Peruvian Agrarian Reform plans of President Juan Velasco Alvarado.

==== 1970s: Studies on colonization and indigenous peoples ====
In the 1970s, the IEP began endeavoring into historical studies and its implications on modern Peru. The institute published studies on how the Spanish colonization of the Americas affected Peru and performed research on the various heritages of indigenous peoples of Peru in the Andes. Notable publications of this time included La Independencia en el Perú, written by Heraclio Bonilla, Clases, Estado y Nación en el Perú, written by Julio Cotler and Formaciones económicas y políticas del mundo andino, written by John Murra.

==== 1980s–2000: Internal conflict and social fragmentation ====
The IEP also published research on violence during the internal conflict in Peru that occurred between 1980 and 2000. During this period, the IEP democratized its structure, choosing to have elections to determine the roles of its members. An expansion to its economics department occurred at this time. Into the 1990s, the institute studied hyperinflation, social fragmentation and terrorism that occurred during that decade. The works of Carlos Iván Degregori provided notable research on authoritarianism, cultural diversity, human rights in Peru and political violence of the period.

=== 21st century ===
Into the 21st century, the IEP responded to the re-democratization of Peru following the end of the Alberto Fujimori regime, beginning to focus on economic inequality, gender studies, poverty and how the social exclusion of some groups affected democracy in the nation.

In 2009, the IEP collaborated with the University of California, Davis, Syracuse University, Cornell University and the International Livestock Research Institute to develop a study on index-based insurance in Kenya and Peru. The institute also signed a memorandum of understanding with the Center for Southeast Asian Studies of Kyoto University between 2007 and 2011. When health taxes were considered in Peru between 2016 and 2018, the IEP advocated for such taxes by providing academic research on how such taxes impacted public health, with the taxes later being approved by the government.

Into the 2020s, the IEP began to perform more research on democratic backsliding and migration patterns in Peru. In 2024, it published studies about machismo in Peru.

== Structure ==
Leadership of the IEP comprises 45 members elected into the Assembly of Associates. A Board of Directors, led by a general director, is elected every two years, with the board 7 members that are tasked with determining the path of the institute. In 2014, there were 180 staff at the IEP, with the number of members dropping to 84 people by 2024.

=== General Directors ===
Below is a list of the General Directors of the IEP since its founding:

- Luis E. Valcárcel (Honorary Director)
- Jorge Bravo Bresani (1964–1965)
- José Matos Mar(1965–1984)
- Julio Cotler (1985–1986)
- Efraín Gonzales de Olarte (1987–1990)
- Carlos Iván Degregori (1991–1994)
- Cecilia Blondet (1995–2000)
- Carolina Trivelli (2001–2004)
- Martín Tanaka (2005–2006)
- Carlos Iván Degregori (2007–2008)
- Marcos Cueto (2009–2010)
- Roxana Barrantes (2011–2014)
- Ricardo Cuenca (2015–2020)
- Natalia González Carrasco (2021–2025)
- Jorge Morel (2025–2027)

== Funding and partnerships ==
Throughout its history, the IEP has received funding from:

- Academy for Educational Development (AED)
- Bernard van Leer Foundation
- Canadian International Development Agency
- Citi Foundation
- Department for International Development
- Ford Foundation
- Harvard University
- Institute of Development Studies
- Inter-American Development Bank
- International Development Research Centre
- International Finance Corporation
- International Fund for Agricultural Development
- International Labour Organization
- Japan External Trade Organization
- Open Society Institute
- Open University of Catalonia
- Oxfam America
- Rockefeller Foundation
- Save the Children
- Swiss Agency for Development and Cooperation
- United Nations Children's Fund (UNICEF)
- United Nations Development Program (UNDP)
- United Nations Educational, Scientific and Cultural Organization (UNESCO)
- United Nations Food and Agriculture Organization (FAO)
- United Nations Population Fund
- United States Agency for International Development (USAID)
- University of Miami Observatory on Inequality in Latin America
- University of Wisconsin–Madison
- Vanderbilt University
- World Bank

It is a partner of the International Food Policy Research Institute.

== See also ==
- Institute for Liberty and Democracy
- Peruvian Center for International Studies
