= Maoism =

Variety of Marxism–Leninism

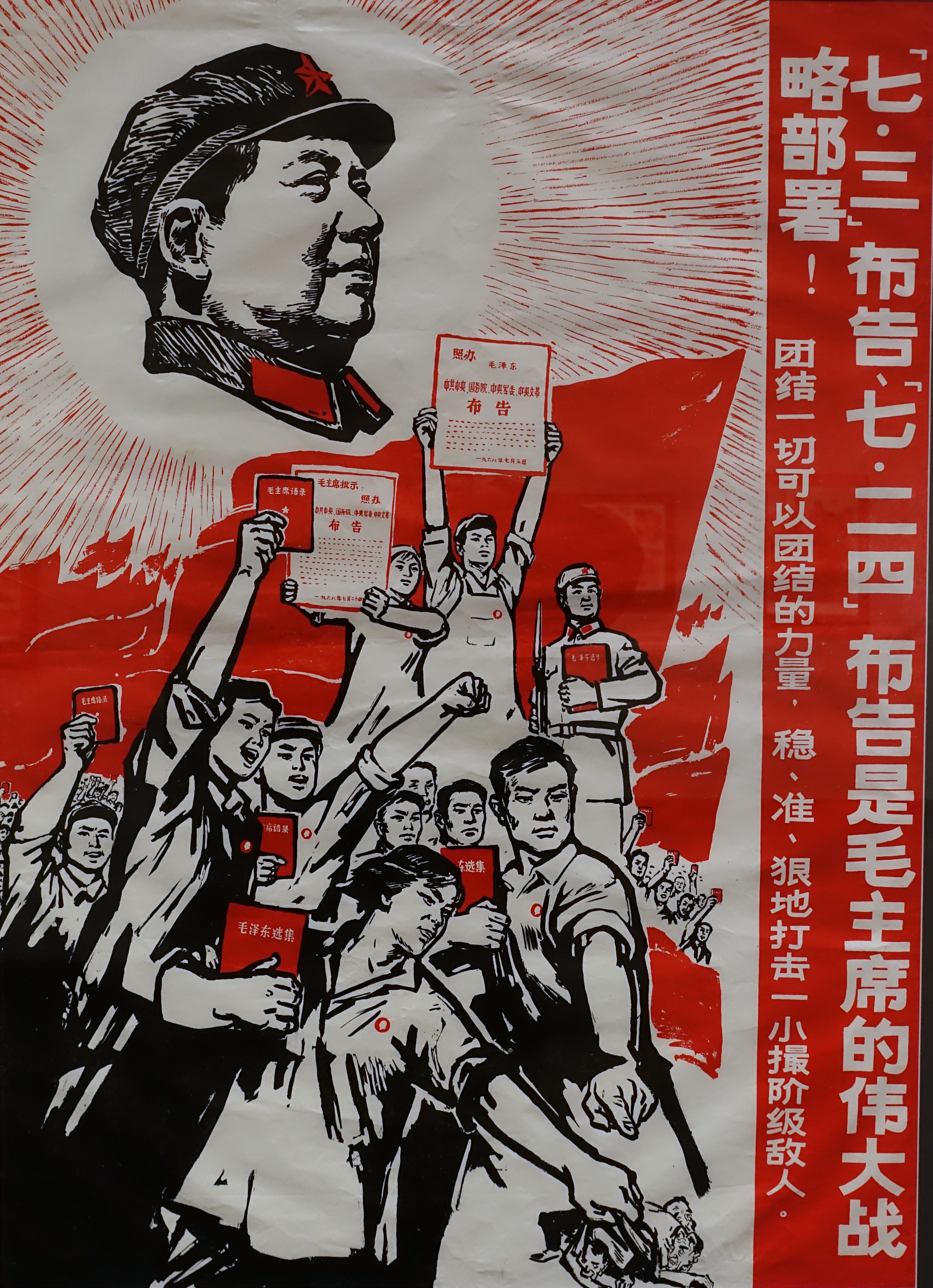
Chinese propaganda portraying Mao Zedong, 1968

Maoism, officially Mao Zedong Thought, (Note: The term "Maoism" is a creation of Mao's supporters; Mao himself always rejected it and preferred the use of the term "Mao Zedong Thought".) (Note: Also called "Mao Tse-tung Thought", "Mao Tse Tung Thought" or "Mao Tsetung Thought", and shortened as "MTTT" or "MTT" before the transition to Pinyin.) is a variety of Marxism–Leninism that Mao Zedong developed while trying to realise a socialist revolution in the agricultural, pre-industrial society of the Republic of China and later the People's Republic of China. A difference between Maoism and traditional Marxism–Leninism is that a united front of progressive forces in class society would lead the revolutionary vanguard in pre-industrial societies rather than communist revolutionaries alone. This theory, in which revolutionary praxis is primary and ideological orthodoxy is secondary, purports to represent urban Marxism–Leninism adapted to pre-industrial China. Later theoreticians expanded on the idea that Mao had adapted Marxism–Leninism to Chinese conditions, arguing that he had in fact updated it fundamentally and that Maoism could be applied universally throughout the world. This ideology is often referred to as Marxism–Leninism–Maoism to distinguish it from the original ideas of Mao.

From the 1950s until the reform and opening up of Deng Xiaoping in the late 1970s, Maoism was the political and military ideology of the Chinese Communist Party and Maoist revolutionary movements worldwide. After the Sino-Soviet split of the 1960s, the Chinese Communist Party and the Communist Party of the Soviet Union each claimed to be the sole heir and successor to Joseph Stalin concerning the correct interpretation of Marxism–Leninism and the ideological leader of world communism.

The English term "Maoism" was coined in 1951 by Benjamin I. Schwartz, who sought to describe Mao's pragmatic strategy of revolution which was based on his adaptation of elements of Marxism-Leninism, particularly his belief that China should be ruled by a disciplined and hierarchical Communist Party, with the support of a mobilized peasant mass base.

== History ==
=== Chinese intellectual tradition ===
At the turn of the 19th century, the contemporary Chinese intellectual tradition was defined by two central concepts: iconoclasm and nationalism.

==== Iconoclastic revolution and anti-Confucianism ====
By the turn of the 20th century, a proportionately small yet socially significant cross-section of China's traditional elite (i.e., landlords and bureaucrats) found themselves increasingly skeptical of the efficacy and even the moral validity of Confucianism. These skeptical iconoclasts formed a new segment of Chinese society, a modern intelligentsia whose arrival—or as the historian of China Maurice Meisner would label it, their defection—heralded the beginning of the destruction of the gentry as a social class in China.

The fall of the Qing dynasty in 1911 marked the final failure of the Confucian moral order, and it did much to make Confucianism synonymous with political and social conservatism in the minds of Chinese intellectuals. This association of conservatism and Confucianism lent to the iconoclastic nature of Chinese intellectual thought during the first decades of the 20th century.

Chinese iconoclasm was expressed most clearly and vociferously by Chen Duxiu during the New Culture Movement, which occurred between 1915 and 1919. Proposing the "total destruction of the traditions and values of the past", the New Culture Movement, spearheaded by the New Youth, a periodical published by Chen Duxiu, profoundly influenced the young Mao Zedong, whose first published work appeared in the magazine's pages.

The social upheavals that occurred as a consequence of the New Culture Movement - as well as a consequence of the May Fourth Movement that followed it - largely focused around the dismantling of traditional Han Chinese cultural norms in which the majority of the populace were illiterate and largely uneducated. This consequence of this social dynamic was that political and economic power largely resided in the hands of a small group of educated elites, and Han Chinese culture formed around principles of respect and reverence for these educated and powerful authority figures. The aforementioned movements sought to combat these social norms through grassroots educational campaigns which were focused primarily around giving educational opportunities towards to people from traditionally uneducated families and normalising all people to be comfortable making challenges towards traditional figures of authority in Confucian society.

The cultural revolution which was experienced by the Soviet Union was similar to the New Culture and May Fourth movements which were experienced by China in that it also placed a great amount of importance on mass education and the normalisation of the challenging of traditional cultural norms in the realising of a socialist society. However, the movements which occurred in the Soviet Union had a far more adversarial mindset towards proponents of traditional values, with the leadership of the party taking action to censor and exile these "enemies of change" on over 200 occasions, rather than exclusively putting pressure on these forces by enacting additive social changes such as education campaigns.

==== Nationalism and the appeal of Marxism ====
Along with iconoclasm, radical anti-imperialism dominated the Chinese intellectual tradition and slowly evolved into a fierce nationalist fervour which influenced Mao's philosophy immensely and was crucial in adapting Marxism to the Chinese model. Vital to understanding Chinese nationalist sentiments of the time is the Treaty of Versailles, which was signed in 1919. The Treaty aroused a wave of bitter nationalist resentment in Chinese intellectuals as lands formerly ceded to Germany in Shandong were—without consultation with the Chinese—transferred to Japanese control rather than returned to Chinese sovereignty.

The adverse reaction culminated in the May Fourth Movement in 1919, during which a protest began with 3,000 students in Beijing displaying their anger at the announcement of the Versailles Treaty's concessions to Japan. The protest turned violent as protesters began attacking the homes and offices of ministers who were seen as cooperating with or being in the direct pay of the Japanese. The popular movement which followed "catalyzed the political awakening of a society which had long seemed inert and dormant."

Another international event would have a significant impact not only on Mao but also on the Chinese intelligentsia. The Russian Revolution elicited great interest among Chinese intellectuals, although the socialist revolution in China was not considered a viable option until after the 4 May Incident. Afterward, "[t]o become a Marxist was one way for a Chinese intellectual to reject both the traditions of the Chinese past and Western domination of the Chinese present."

=== Yan'an period between November 1935 and March 1947 ===
Immediately following the Long March, Mao and the Chinese Communist Party (CCP) were headquartered in the Yan'an Soviet in Shaanxi. During this period, Mao established himself as a Marxist theoretician and produced most of the works that would later be canonised as the "Thought of Mao Zedong". The rudimentary philosophical base of Chinese Communist ideology is laid down in Mao's numerous dialectical treatises and was conveyed to newly recruited party members. This period established ideological independence from Moscow for Mao and the CCP.

Although the Yan'an period did answer some of the ideological and theoretical questions raised by the Chinese Communist Revolution, it left many crucial questions unresolved, including how the Chinese Communist Party was supposed to launch a socialist revolution while wholly separated from the urban sphere.

=== Mao Zedong's intellectual development ===
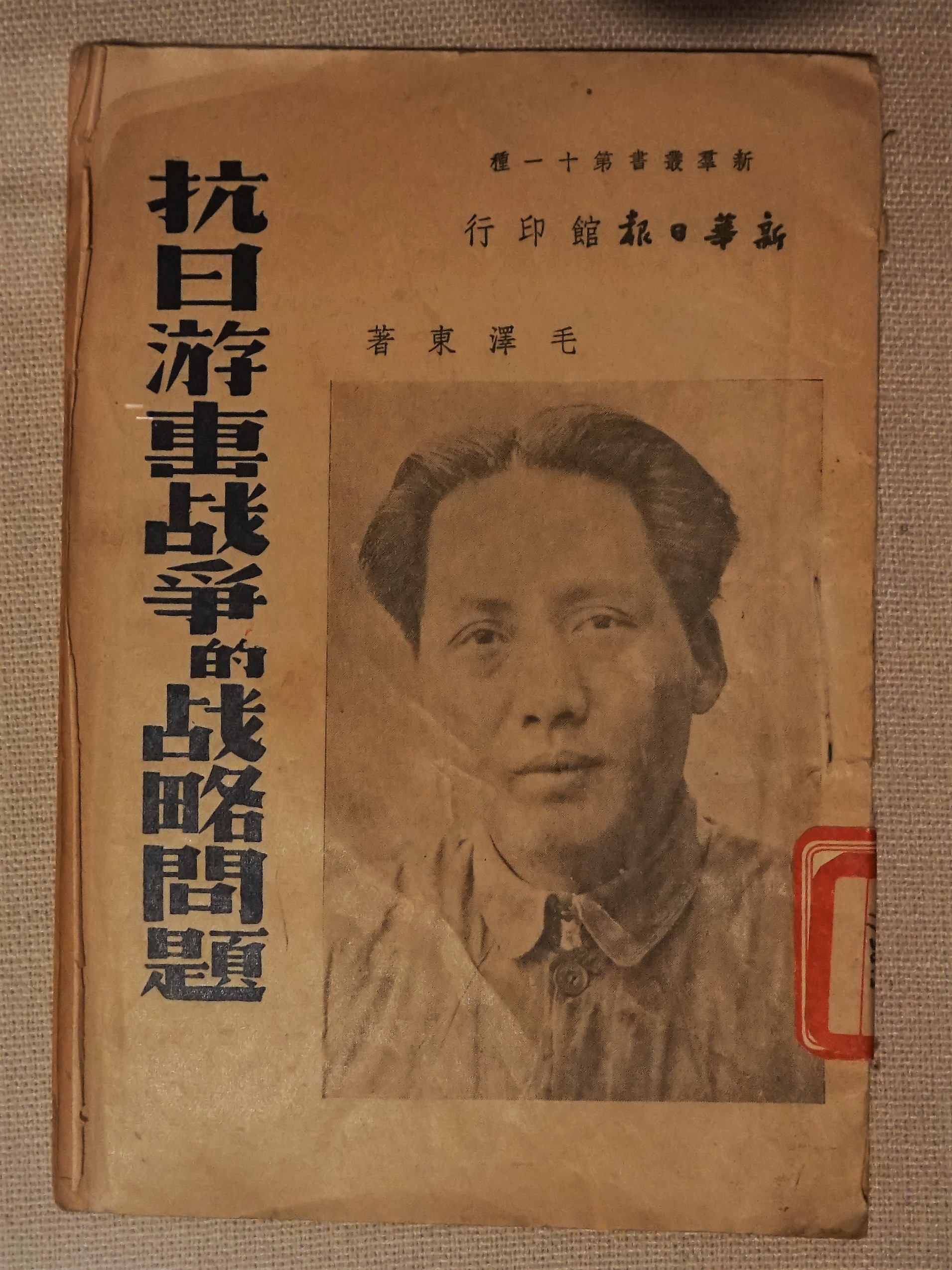
Strategic Issues of Anti-Japanese Guerrilla War (1938)

Mao's intellectual development can be divided into five significant periods, namely:

1. the initial Marxist period from 1920 to 1926
2. the formative Maoist period from 1927 to 1935
3. the mature Maoist period from 1935 to 1940
4. the Civil-War period from 1940 to 1949
5. the post-1949 period following the revolutionary victory

==== Initial Marxist period (1920–1926) ====
Marxist thinking employs immanent socioeconomic explanations, whereas Mao's reasons were declarations of his enthusiasm. Mao did not believe education alone would transition from capitalism to communism for three main reasons: (1) the capitalists would not repent and turn towards communism on their own; (2) the rulers must be overthrown by the people; (3) "the proletarians are discontented, and a demand for communism has arisen and had already become a fact."

==== Formative Maoist period (1927–1935) ====
In this period, Mao avoided all theoretical implications in his literature and employed a minimum of Marxist category thought. His writings in this period failed to elaborate on what he meant by the "Marxist method of political and class analysis".

==== Mature Maoist period (1935–1940) ====
Intellectually, this was Mao's most fruitful time. The orientation shift was apparent in his pamphlet Strategic Problems of China's Revolutionary War (December 1936). This pamphlet tried to provide a theoretical veneer for his concern with revolutionary practice. Mao started to separate from the Soviet model since it was not automatically applicable to China. China's unique set of historical circumstances demanded a correspondingly unique application of Marxist theory, an application that would have to diverge from the Soviet approach.

In the late 1930s, writings and speeches by Mao and other leaders close to Mao began to emerge as the Communist Party's developing ideology. This was described as the Sinicization of Marxism. Mao's view was that these concepts were not a complete system of thought but were still developing. As a result, he decided not to use the term "Maoism" and instead favoured characterising these ideological contributions as Mao Zedong Thought (Mao Zedong sixiang).

Beginning in the Yan'an period, Mao Zedong Thought became the ideological guide for developing revolutionary culture and a long-term social movement.

Strategic Issues in the Chinese Revolutionary War (1947)

==== Civil War period (1940–1949) ====
Unlike the Mature period, this period was intellectually barren. Mao focused more on revolutionary practice and paid less attention to Marxist theory. He continued to emphasise theory as practice-oriented knowledge. The most crucial topic of the theory he delved into was in connection with the Cheng Feng movement of 1942. Here, Mao summarised the correlation between Marxist theory and Chinese practice: "The target is the Chinese revolution, the arrow is Marxism–Leninism. We Chinese communists seek this arrow for no other purpose than to hit the target of the Chinese revolution and the revolution of the east." The only new emphasis was Mao's concern with two types of subjectivist deviation: (1) dogmatism, the excessive reliance upon abstract theory; (2) empiricism, excessive dependence on experience.

In 1945, in its 7th national congress, the party's first historical resolution put forward Mao Zedong Thought as the party's unified ideology. It was also incorporated into the party's constitution.

==== Establishment of the PRC ====
To Mao, the victory of 1949 was a confirmation of theory and practice. "Optimism is the keynote to Mao's intellectual orientation in the post-1949 period." Mao assertively revised the theory to relate it to the new practice of socialist construction. These revisions are apparent in the 1951 version of On Contradiction. "In the 1930s, when Mao talked about contradiction, he meant the contradiction between subjective thought and objective reality. In Dialectal Materialism of 1940, he saw idealism and materialism as two possible correlations between subjective thought and objective reality. In the 1940s, he introduced no new elements into his understanding of the subject-object contradiction. In the 1951 version of On Contradiction, he saw contradiction as a universal principle underlying all processes of development, yet with each contradiction possessed of its own particularity."

In 1951, the English term "Maoism" was coined by Benjamin I. Schwartz in his text Chinese Communism and the Rise of Mao. Schwartz used the term to refer to what he viewed as Mao's pragmatic strategy of revolution that adapted elements of Marxism-Leninism, particularly a disciplined and hierarchical Communist Party, onto a mobilized peasant mass base.

In 1956, Mao first fully theorised his view of continuous revolution.

==== Cultural Revolution ====
The theory of cultural revolution - rooted in Marxism-Leninism thought - states that the proletarian revolution and the dictatorship of the proletariat do not wipe out bourgeois ideology; the class struggle continues and even intensifies during socialism. Therefore, a constant struggle against bourgeois ideology, traditional cultural values, and the social roots that encourage both of them must be conducted in order to create and maintain a society in which socialism can succeed.

Practical examples of this theory's application can be seen in the rapid social changes undergone by post-revolution Soviet Union in the late 1920s -1930s as well as pre-revolution China in the New Culture and May Fourth movements of the 1910s-1920s. Both of these sociocultural movements can be seen as shaping Maoist theory on the need for and goals of Cultural Revolution, and subsequently the mass cultural movements enacted by the CCP under Mao, which include the Great Leap Forward, the Anti-rightist movement of the 1950s, and the Great Proletarian Cultural Revolution of the 1960s-1970s.

The most prominent example of a Maoist application of cultural revolution can be seen in the Great Proletarian Cultural Revolution of the 1960s and 1970s wherein Mao claimed that "Revisionist" forces had entered society and infiltrated the government, with the goal of reinstating traditionalism and capitalism in China. Leaning more on the example of the Soviet Union, which involved the silencing and subjugation of adversarial political forces to help bring about a cultural change, Mao called for his followers to speak openly and critically about revisionist forces that they were observing in society and to expel them, assuring them that their actions would be endorsed by the party and that their efforts would in no way be interfered with. This warrant granted to the public ultimately lead to roughly ten years in which those seen as "Revisionist" forces - largely understood to mean landlords, rich peasants, and the so-called "bourgeoise academic" - were publicly criticised and denounced in places of gathering, and in more extreme examples had physical violence inflicted on them, including being beaten, tortured, and/or killed for their perceived crimes.

During the Cultural Revolution, Lin Biao's view of the charismatic aspects of Maoism became the primary interpretation. According to Lin, the essence of Maoism was that "the atom bomb of the spirit is much more powerful and more useful than the material atom bomb. Only we can possess this." Other prominent advocates of this interpretation of Maoism included the Gang of Four.

Beginning in 1967, Mao and the PLA sought to restrain the mass organisations that had developed during the early phase of the Cultural Revolution, and began reframing the movement as one to study Mao Zedong Thought rather than using it as a guide to immediate action.

=== Deng era ===
Shortly after Mao died in 1976, Deng Xiaoping initiated socialist market reforms in 1978, thereby beginning the radical change in Mao's ideology in the PRC. During Reform and Opening Up, Deng Xiaoping described the "true spirit" of Mao Zedong Thought as "seeking truth from facts". Deng's emphasis on seeking truth from fact meant that state policies are judged on their practical consequences, and in many areas, the role of ideology in determining policy was considerably reduced. Deng also separated Mao from Maoism, making it clear that Mao was fallible, and hence the truth of Maoism comes from observing social consequences rather than by using Mao's quotations dogmatically.

Academic Matthew Galway writes, "The CPC did not de-Maoize but instead reassessed his legacy and reanimated his thought with emphasis on positive contributions while acknowledging Mao's mistakes. It did so to ensure that his Thought remained important and a wellspring of experiential knowledge from which the CPC could draw lessons and guidance."

Mao Zedong Thought was established as one of the Four Cardinal Principles of the People's Republic of China.

On June 27, 1981, the Communist Party's Central Committee adopted the Resolution on Certain Questions in the History of Our Party since the Founding of the People's Republic of China. The Resolution assesses the legacy of the Mao era, describing Mao as first among equals in the development of Mao Zedong Thought before 1949 and deeming Mao Zedong Thought as successful in establishing national independence, transforming China's social classes, the development of economic self-sufficiency, the expansion of education and health care, and China's leadership role in the Third World. The Resolution describes setbacks during the period 1957 to 1964 (although it generally affirms this period) and major mistakes beginning in 1965. The Resolution describes upholding the guidance of Mao Zedong Thought and Marxism-Leninism as among the Communist Party's cardinal principles.

The official view is that China has now reached an economic and political stage, known as the primary stage of socialism, in which China faces new and different problems completely unforeseen by Mao, and as such, the solutions that Mao advocated are no longer relevant to China's current conditions. The 1981 Resolution reads:

Chief responsibility for the grave 'Left' error of the 'cultural revolution,' an error comprehensive in magnitude and protracted in duration, does indeed lie with Comrade Mao Zedong [...] [and] far from making a correct analysis of many problems, he confused right and wrong and the people with the enemy [...] herein lies his tragedy.

=== Xi era ===
Xi Jinping describes Mao Zedong Thought as "the fundamental guiding thought of the CPC ... a series of theoretical summarizations and conclusions that Chinese Communists represented by Mao Zedong drew from their unique experience in China's revolution and development in accordance with the basic tenets of Marxism ... It is the crystallization of the collective wisdom of the CPC."

In his 2013 speech Carry on the Enduring Spirit of Mao Zedong Thought, Xi summarized Mao Zedong Thought as having three basic aspects: seeking truth from facts, the mass line, and national independence and autonomy.

Contemporary Maoists in China criticise the social inequalities created by the CCP. Some Maoists say that Deng's Reform and Opening economic policies that introduced market principles spelled the end of Maoism in China. However, Deng asserted that his reforms were upholding Mao Zedong Thought in accelerating the output of the country's productive forces. A recent example of a Chinese politician regarded as neo-Maoist in terms of political strategies and mass mobilisation via red songs was Bo Xilai in Chongqing.

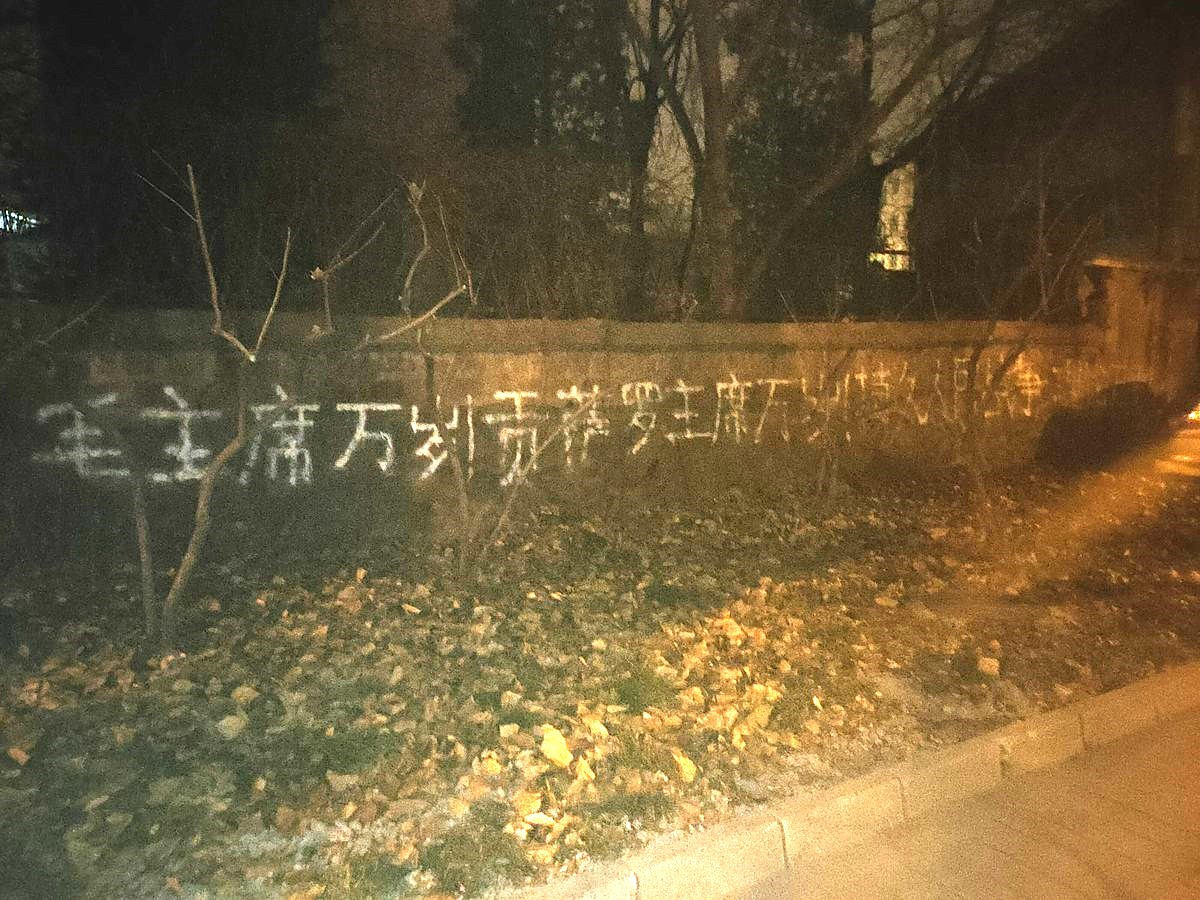
"Long live Chairman Mao! Long live Chairman Gonzalo! Long live the theory of protracted people's war!" (毛主席万岁！贡萨罗主席万岁！持久人民战争理论万岁！) New Leftist graffiti on a wall at Qinghua South Road, Beijing, 6 December 2021.

Although not very influential, some radical Maoists, disgruntled by the injustices suffered by migrant workers, organised a number of protests and strikes, including the Jasic incident. In the 2020s, influenced by the growing wealth gap and the 996 working hour system, Mao's thoughts are being revived in China's generation Z, as they question authority of the CCP. The Chinese government has censored some Maoist posts.

The 2021 Resolution on the Major Achievements and Historical Experience of the Party over the Past Century describes Mao Zedong Thought as "a summation of theories, principles, and experience on China's revolution and construction that has been proven correct through practice, and [having] put forward a series of important theories for socialist construction."

== Components ==
The CCP's ideological framework distinguishes between political ideas described as "Thought" (as in Mao Zedong Thought) or as "Theory" (as in Deng Xiaoping Theory). Thought carries more weight than Theory and conveys the greater relative importance of a leader's ideological and historical influence. The process of formalising a leader's political thinking in the Marxist tradition is important in establishing a leader's ideological legitimacy.

Mao Zedong Thought is frequently described as the result of collaboration between the first-generation leaders of the CCP and is principally based on Mao's analysis of Marxism and Chinese history. It is often also described as the adaptation of Marxism to the Chinese context. Observing that concepts of both Marxism and Chinese culture were and are contested, academic Rebecca Karl writes that the development of Mao Zedong Thought is best viewed as the result of Mao's mutual interpretation of these concepts producing Mao's view of theory and revolutionary practice.

=== New Democracy ===
The theory of the New Democracy was known to the Chinese revolutionaries from the late 1940s. This thesis held that for most people, the "long road to socialism" could only be opened by a "national, popular, democratic, anti-feudal and anti-imperialist revolution, run by the communists".

=== People's war ===
Holding that "political power grows out of the barrel of a gun", Maoism emphasises the "revolutionary struggle of the vast majority of people against the exploiting classes and their state structures", which Mao termed a people's war. Mobilising large parts of rural populations to revolt against established institutions by engaging in guerrilla warfare, Maoist Thought focuses on "surrounding the cities from the countryside".

Maoism views the industrial-rural divide as a major division exploited by capitalism, identifying capitalism as involving industrial urban developed First World societies ruling over rural developing Third World societies. Maoism identifies peasant insurgencies in particular national contexts as part of a context of world revolution, in which Maoism views the global countryside as overwhelming the global cities. Due to this imperialism by the capitalist urban First World toward the rural Third World, Maoism has endorsed national liberation movements in the Third World.

=== Mass line ===
Building on the theory of the vanguard party by Vladimir Lenin, the theory of the mass line outlines a strategy for the revolutionary leadership of the masses, consolidation of the dictatorship of the proletariat, and strengthening of the party and the building of socialism. The mass line can be summarised as "from the masses, to the masses". It has three components or stages:

1. Gathering the diverse ideas of the masses.
2. Processing or concentrating these ideas from the perspective of revolutionary Marxism, in light of the long-term, ultimate interests of the masses (which the masses may sometimes only dimly perceive) and in light of a scientific analysis of the objective situation.
3. Returning these concentrated ideas to the masses in the form of a political line which will advance the mass struggle toward revolution.

These three steps should be applied repeatedly, reiteratively uplifting practice and knowledge to higher and higher stages.

=== Contradiction ===
In any given thing, the unity of the opposites is conditional, temporary, and transitory, and hence relative, whereas the struggle of opposites is absolute.

— Mao Zedong, On the Correct Handling of Contradictions Among the People

Mao drew from the writings of Karl Marx, Friedrich Engels, and Vladimir Lenin in elaborating his theory. Philosophically, his most important reflections emerge on the concept of "contradiction" (maodun). In two major essays, On Contradiction and On the Correct Handling of Contradictions Among the People, he adopts the idea that contradiction is present in matter itself and thus also in the ideas of the brain. Matter always develops through a dialectical contradiction: "The interdependence of the contradictory aspects present in all things and the struggle between these aspects determine the life of things and push their development forward. There is nothing that does not contain contradiction; without contradiction nothing would exist".

Mao held that contradictions were the essential feature of society, and a wide range of contradictions dominates society, and this calls for various strategies. Revolution is necessary to resolve the fully antagonistic contradictions between labour and capital. Contradictions within the revolutionary movement call for an ideological correction to prevent them from becoming antagonistic. Furthermore, each contradiction (including class struggle, the contradiction holding between relations of production and the concrete development of forces of production) expresses itself in a series of other contradictions, some dominant, others not. "There are many contradictions in the process of development of a complex thing, and one of them is necessarily the principal contradiction whose existence and development determine or influence the existence and development of the other contradictions".

The principal contradiction should be tackled with priority when trying to make the fundamental contradiction "solidify". Mao elaborates on this theme in the essay On Practice, "on the relation between knowledge and practice, between knowing and doing". Here, Practice connects "contradiction" with "class struggle" in the following way, claiming that inside a mode of production, there are three realms where practice functions: economic production, scientific experimentation (which also takes place in economic production and should not be radically disconnected from the former) and finally class struggle. These are the proper objects of economy, scientific knowledge, and politics.

These three spheres deal with matter in its various forms, socially mediated. As a result, they are the only realms where knowledge may arise (since truth and knowledge only make sense in relation to matter, according to Marxist epistemology). Mao emphasises—like Marx in trying to confront the "bourgeois idealism" of his time—that knowledge must be based on empirical evidence. Knowledge results from hypotheses verified in the contrast with a real object; this real object, despite being mediated by the subject's theoretical frame, retains its materiality and will offer resistance to those ideas that do not conform to its truth. Thus, in each of these realms (economic, scientific, and political practice), contradictions (principle and secondary) must be identified, explored, and put to function to achieve the communist goal. This involves the need to know "scientifically" how the masses produce (how they live, think and work), to obtain knowledge of how class struggle (the central contradiction that articulates a mode of production in its various realms) expresses itself.

Mao Zedong Thought is described as being Marxism–Leninism adapted to Chinese conditions, whereas its variant Marxism–Leninism–Maoism is considered universally applicable

=== Three Worlds Theory ===
In 1974, China announced its Three Worlds Theory at the UN.

Three Worlds Theory states that during the Cold War, two imperialist states formed the "first world"—the United States and the Soviet Union. The second world consisted of the other imperialist states in their spheres of influence. The third world consisted of non-imperialist countries. Both the first and the second world exploit the third world, but the first world is the most aggressive party. The first- and second-world workers are "bought up" by imperialism, preventing socialist revolution. On the other hand, the people of the third world have not even a short-sighted interest in the prevailing circumstances. Hence revolution is most likely to appear in third-world countries, which again will weaken imperialism, opening up for revolutions in other countries too.

=== Agrarian socialism ===
Maoism departs from conventional European-inspired Marxism in that it focuses on the agrarian countryside rather than the urban industrial forces—this is known as agrarian socialism. Notably, Maoist parties in Peru, Nepal, and the Philippines have adopted equal stresses on urban and rural areas, depending on the country's focus on economic activity. Maoism broke with the framework of the Soviet Union under Nikita Khrushchev, dismissing it as state capitalist and Marxist revisionism, a pejorative term among communists referring to those who fight for capitalism in the name of socialism and who depart from historical and dialectical materialism.

Although Maoism is critical of urban industrial capitalist powers, it views urban industrialisation as a prerequisite to expanding economic development and the socialist reorganisation of the countryside, with the goal being the achievement of rural industrialisation that would abolish the distinction between town and countryside.

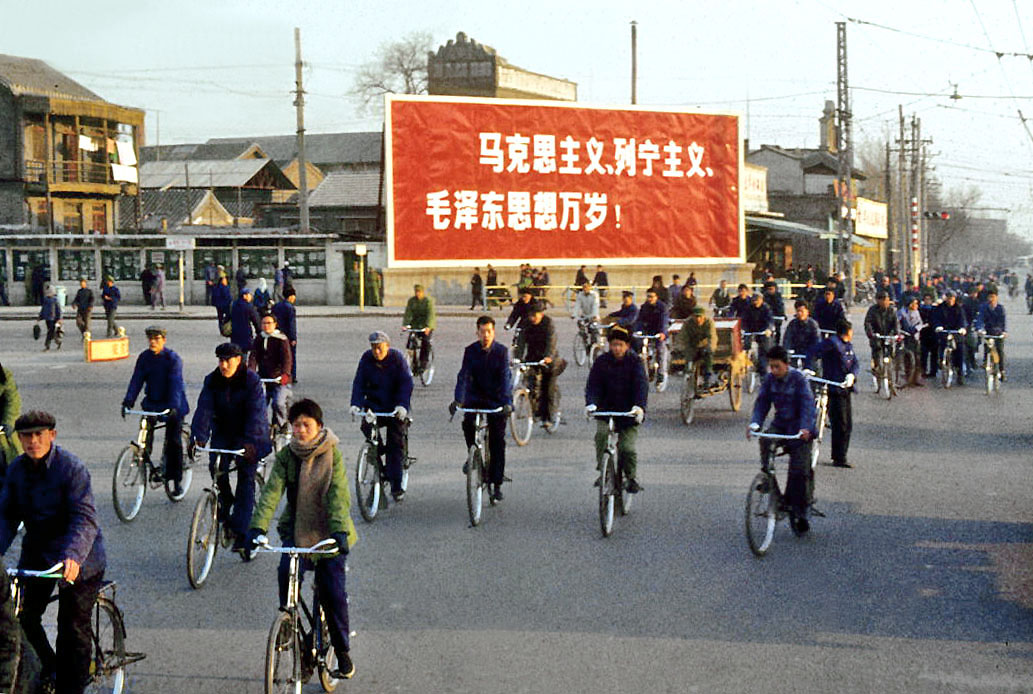
Beijing, 1978. The billboard reads, "Long Live Marxism, Leninism and Mao Zedong Thought!"

Maoism and Marxism differ in how the proletariat is defined and in which political and economic conditions would start a communist revolution.

1. For Marx, the proletariat was the urban working class, which was determined in the revolution by which the bourgeoisie overthrew feudalism. For Mao Zedong, the revolutionary class was the millions of peasants he referred to as the popular masses. Mao based his revolution upon the peasantry. They possessed, according to him, two qualities: (i) they were poor and (ii) they were a political blank slate; in Mao's words, "[a] clean sheet of paper has no blotches, and so the newest and most beautiful words can be written on it."
2. For Marx, the proletarian revolution was internally fuelled by the capitalist mode of production; as capitalism developed, "a tension arises between the productive forces and the mode of production." The political tension between the productive forces (the workers) and the owners of the means of production (the capitalists) would be an inevitable incentive for the proletarian revolution, resulting in a communist society. Mao did not subscribe to Marx's theory of inevitable cyclicality in the economic system. His goal was to unify the Chinese nation and so realise progressive change for China in the form of communism; hence, a revolution was needed at once. In The Great Union of the Popular Masses (1919), Mao wrote that "[t]he decadence of the state, the sufferings of humanity, and the darkness of society have all reached an extreme."

=== Populism ===
Mao also believed strongly in the concept of a unified people. These notions prompted him to investigate the peasant uprisings in Hunan while the rest of China's communists were in the cities and focused on the orthodox Marxist proletariat. Many of the pillars of Maoism, such as the distrust of intellectuals and the abhorrence of occupational specialty, are typical populist ideas. The concept of "people's war", central to Maoist thought, is directly populist in its origins. Mao believed that intellectuals and party cadres would first become students of the masses and teachers of the masses later. This concept was vital to the aforementioned "people's war" strategy.

== International influence ==
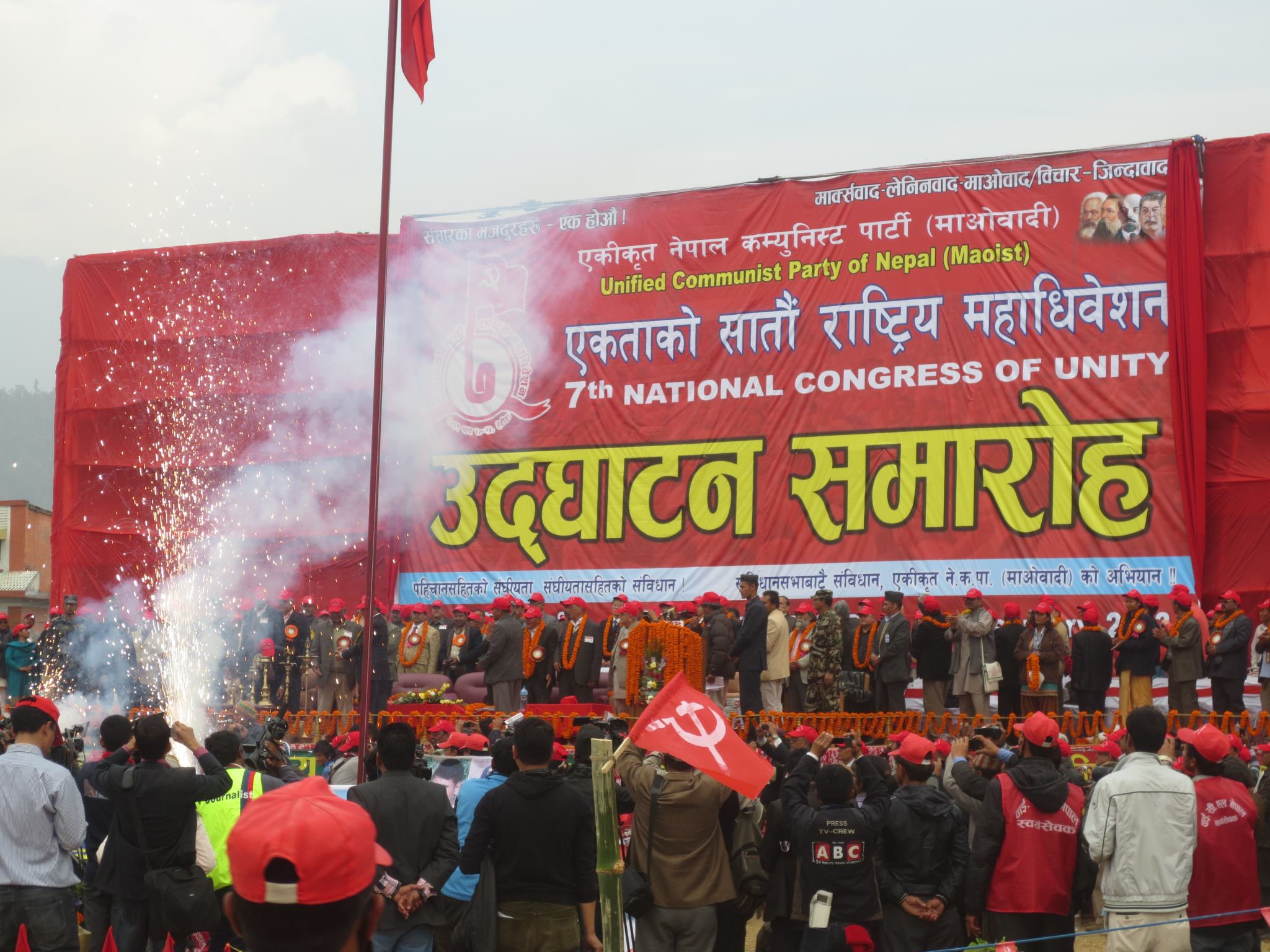
The Communist Party of Nepal (Maoist Centre) in February 2013

From 1962 onwards, the challenge to the Soviet hegemony in the world communist movement made by the CCP resulted in various divisions in communist parties around the world. At an early stage, the Albanian Party of Labour sided with the CCP. So did many of the mainstream (non-splinter group) Communist parties in South-East Asia, like the Communist Party of Burma, the Communist Party of Thailand, and the Communist Party of Indonesia. Some Asian parties, like the Communist Party of Vietnam and the Workers' Party of Korea, attempted to take a middle-ground position.

Under the rule of Ali Soilih and the DRCP party, the State of the Comoros was a Maoist state; the Moissy militia was partly inspired by Mao's Red Guard.

Cambodia's Khmer Rouge could have been considered a replica of the Maoist regime under the leadership of Angkar, however Maoists and Marxists generally contend that the CPK strongly deviated from Marxist doctrine and the few references to Maoist China in CPK propaganda were critical of the Chinese.

Various efforts have sought to regroup the international communist movement under Maoism since Mao's death in 1976. Many parties and organisations were formed in the West and Third World that upheld links to the CCP. Often, they took names such as Communist Party (Marxist–Leninist) or Revolutionary Communist Party to distinguish themselves from the traditional pro-Soviet communist parties. The pro-CCP movements were, in many cases, based on the wave of student radicalism that engulfed the world in the 1960s and 1970s.

Only one Western classic communist party sided with the CCP, the Communist Party of New Zealand. Under the leadership of the CCP and Mao Zedong, a parallel international communist movement emerged to rival that of the Soviets, although it was never as formalised and homogeneous as the pro-Soviet tendency.

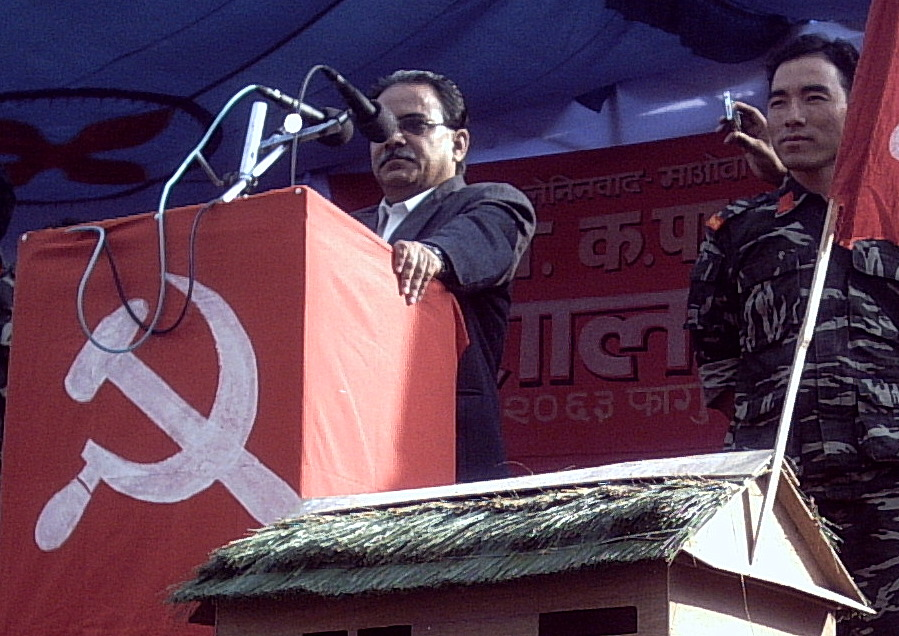
Maoist leader Prachanda speaking at a rally in Pokhara, Nepal

After the death of Mao in 1976 and the resulting power struggles in China that followed, the international Maoist movement was divided into three camps. One group, composed of various ideologically nonaligned groups, gave weak support to the new Chinese leadership under Deng Xiaoping. Another camp denounced the new leadership as traitors to the cause of Marxism–Leninism–Mao Zedong Thought. The third camp sided with the Albanians in denouncing the Three Worlds Theory of the CCP (see the Sino-Albanian split).

The pro-Albanian camp would start to function as an international group as well (led by Enver Hoxha and the APL) and was also able to amalgamate many of the communist groups in Latin America, including the Communist Party of Brazil. Later, Latin American Communists, such as Peru's Shining Path, also embraced the tenets of Maoism.

The new Chinese leadership showed little interest in the foreign groups supporting Mao's China. Many of the foreign parties that were fraternal parties aligned with the Chinese government before 1975 either disbanded, abandoned the new Chinese government entirely, or even renounced Marxism–Leninism and developed into non-communist, social democratic parties. What is today called the international Maoist movement evolved out of the second camp—the parties that opposed Deng and said they upheld the true legacy of Mao.

=== Afghanistan ===
The Progressive Youth Organization was a Maoist organisation in Afghanistan. It was founded in 1965 with Akram Yari as its first leader, advocating the overthrow of the then-current order through people's war.

The Communist (Maoist) Party of Afghanistan was founded in 2004 through the merger of five MLM parties.

=== Australia ===
The Communist Party of Australia (Marxist-Leninist) is a Maoist organisation in Australia. It was founded in 1964 as a pro-Mao split from the Australian Communist Party.

=== Bangladesh ===
The Purba Banglar Sarbahara Party is a Maoist party in Bangladesh. It was founded in 1968 with Siraj Sikder as its first leader. The party played a role in the Bangladesh Liberation War.

=== Belgium ===
The Sino-Soviet split had a significant influence on communism in Belgium. The pro-Soviet Communist Party of Belgium experienced a split of a Maoist wing under Jacques Grippa. The latter was a lower-ranking CPB member before the split, but Grippa rose in prominence as he formed a worthy internal Maoist opponent to the CPB leadership. His followers were sometimes referred to as Grippisten or Grippistes. When it became clear that the differences between the pro-Moscow leadership and the pro-Beijing wing were too significant, Grippa and his entourage decided to split from the CPB and formed the Communist Party of Belgium – Marxist–Leninist (PCBML). The PCBML had some influence, mainly in the heavily industrialised Borinage region of Wallonia, but never managed to gather more support than the CPB. The latter held most of its leadership and base within the pro-Soviet camp. However, the PCBML was the first European Maoist party and was recognised at its foundation as the largest and most important Maoist organisation in Europe outside of Albania.

Although the PCBML never really gained a foothold in Flanders, there was a reasonably successful Maoist movement in this region. Out of the student unions that formed in the wake of the May 1968 protests, Alle Macht Aan De Arbeiders (AMADA), or All Power To The Workers, was formed as a vanguard party under construction. This Maoist group originated primarily from students from the universities of Leuven and Ghent but did manage to gain some influence among the striking miners during the shutdowns of the Belgian stone coal mines in the late 1960s and early 1970s. This group became the Workers' Party of Belgium (PVDA-PTB) in 1979 and still exists today, although its power base has shifted somewhat from Flanders towards Wallonia. The WPB stayed loyal to the teachings of Mao for a long time, but after a general congress held in 2008, the party formally broke with its Maoist/Stalinist past.

=== Ecuador ===
The Communist Party of Ecuador – Red Sun, also known as Puka Inti, is a Maoist guerrilla organisation in Ecuador.

=== Denmark ===
A small presence of anti-revisionism, initially Maoist, came to existence in 1964. Dissidents split from the Communist Party of Denmark founded the Communist Working Circle (Kommunistisk Arbejdskreds, KAK) [da] (1964-1978/1980). In September 1967 an important part of the youth section of the Danish Communist Party split, and united with the KAK, resulting with the foundation of the Communist Youth League (Kommunistisk Ungdomsforbund, KUF). However, soon KAK shifted towards a Third Worldist position, causing the more orthodox anti-revisionist members leaded by Benito Scocozza splitting in 1968, founding the Communist League Marxist-Leninist (Kommunistisk Forbund Marxister-Leninister, KFML) [da] on September 15, 1968. KAK formally split its ties with China in 1969, and started to carry out robberies to fund Third World movements. From the winter of 1977-to-1978, KAK started a criticism and self-criticism process, resulting with KAK splitting into three groups in August 1978: 1) The group of Gotfred Appel and Ulla Hauton (original leaders) who claimed to expel other groups and reverting to the Chinese camp, adapting the Three Worlds Theory, continuing to publish group's organ Kommunistisk Orientering (Communist Orientation) up to 1980, 2) the Marxist Working Group (Marxistisk Arbejdsgruppe, MAG), who failed to deepen its claimed criticism and self-criticism, which resulted with its dissolve in 1980, and 3) more pro-Soviet and Third Worldist members claiming to expel Appel and Hauton, and founding the Manifesto-Communist Working Group (Manifest–Kommunistisk Arbejdsgruppe, M-KA) [da] on September 3, 1978. Due to its and its successor Third Worldist group's activities, they were called as the Blekingegade Gang.

KFML quickly rose to prominence as the officially recognised group in Denmark. At the same time, initially friendly and then rivalling group called Revolutionary Inhabitants Organization marxist-leninists (BOm-l) was founded in March 1972. These two groups united for a time, however unity didn't lasted and in April 1973 cadres originating from the BOml split again, this time with the name Marxist-Leninist Unity League (Marxistisk-Leninistisk Enhedsforbund, MLE). However, with the rising prominence of the KFML, MLE split into two in 1974 with these members joining to KFML, remaining members dissolved the group in 1975. Other than MLE, there was also Communist Workers' League Marxist-Leninists (Kommunistisk Arbejderforbund marxister-leninister, KAm-l) [da], founded on December 30, 1973, and dissolved on March 26, 1983. Initially pro-TWT and pro-Deng, group re-evaluated its position on China and backpedalled from their support given to Deng.

KFML initially suffered a setback with important number of members leaving on the question of Stalin, however they recovered from it by the time new members and groups joining to them. A youth organisation called Communist Youth Marxist–Leninists (Kommunistisk Ungdom Marxister-Leninister, KUML) dissolved to join the KFML in Autumn 1971. After some success in the work amongst the working classes, by 1975 KFML decided to found a party, and on November 21, 1976 Communist Workers Party (KAP) was founded. A pro-Deng and pro-TWT party, it was the biggest in Danish Maoism, however its loyalty to Chinese positions caused some splits, namely the Marxist-Leninist League in 1976 and the Communist Association (Marxist-Leninists) (Kommunistisk Sammenslutning (marxister-leninister), KS(m-l)) [da] in May 1978. These two groups took a pro-Albanian turn, and founded the Communist Party of Denmark/Marxist–Leninists on December 31, 1978, which eventually abandoned Maoism (and with the fall of the PSRA, Hoxhaism itself) altogether. Further developments in Chinese internal and foreign policy forced the KAP distancing itself from the ruling Chinese regime, and while being loyal to Mao Zedong Thought, it started to give more importance to Danish situation, calling for a "Danish socialism". This process (and the worldwide decay of the pro-China parties) eventually caused to KAP losing more than half of its membership and its received votes, which led the KAP to dissolving itself on November 24, 1994.

A group from the Faroe Islands, Oyggjaframi (M-L) (OFML), also was a Maoist group. Initially founded as a split from main body in August 1972, it held a congress in March 1975, and published its newspaper on May Day 1976. While being affiliated with the KAP, with the Sino-Albanian split, group changed its allegiance, and thus distanced itself from the KAP and other main Nordic Marxist-Leninist movements, aligning itself with the DKP/ML.

=== France ===
In 1964, a Maoist circle formed at École Normale among students who studied with Louis Althusser. The group initially sought to develop leadership over the French Communist Party's (PCF) student organisation, but in December 1966 their own organisation, the Union of Marxist-Leninist Communist Youth.

In 1966, PCF members dissatisfied with the party's direction formed their own movement and in 1967 they founded the Maoist-oriented French Marxist–Leninist Communist Party.

French Maoism grew after the Sino-Soviet split and particularly from 1966 to 1976. After May 68, the cultural influence of French Maoists increased. Maoists became the first group of French intellectuals to emphasise gay and lesbian rights in their publications and contributed to the nascent feminist movement in France.

The École Normale Maoists merged with leaders of May 68 to form Proletarian Left. For six years, it was the most visible Maoist organisation in France. Proletarian Left worked in cities, working class suburbs, rural areas, and immigrant communities. Its areas of focus included abortion rights, international leftism, and organising in universities and among factory workers. Proletarian Left included developed supporters among intellectuals, such as Jean-Paul Sartre (who nominally filled the position of editor at a Proletarian Left newspaper after its editor was arrested) and Michel Foucault (who was influential in Proletarian Left's Prison Information Group, which investigated the conditions of prisoners, including political prisoners). Proletarian Left was radically anti-hierarchical, and ultimately failed to maintain its organisation, dissolving in 1974.

Alain Badiou is one of the central intellectual figures in the analysis of French Maoism and its legacies.

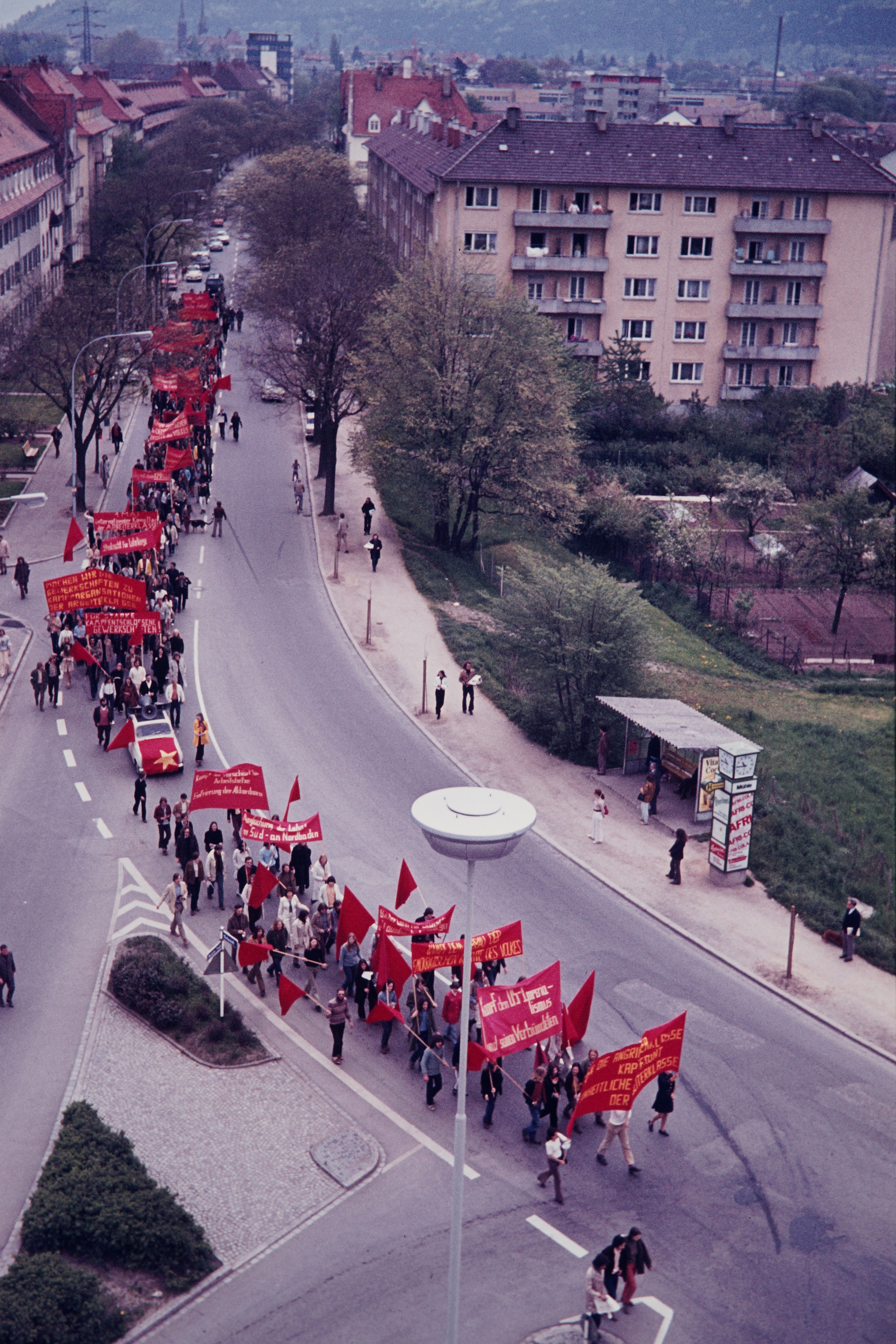
Bund Kommunistischer Arbeiter (BKA) demonstration, May 1972

=== Germany ===
In West Germany, several groups arose by the end of the 1960s which adhered to Maoism as part of the German New Left movement.

=== India ===
Mao's ideology developed adherents among Indian communists during the 1946-1951 Telangana uprising in Andhra Pradesh and the Tebhaga Movement in Bengal (1946–1950).

Quotations from Chairman Mao Zedong gained popularity following the 1967 Naxalbari uprising and the beginning of the Naxalite Movement. The leader of the first phase of the Naxalite Movement, Charu Majumdar, placed major emphasis on the text, requiring it to be studied and to be read aloud to illiterate peasants. During this phase of the Naxalite Movement, Quotations was popular among both movement participants and those who sympathised with it. Contending that China's approach to revolution provided the path for revolution in India, Majumdar and others split from the Communist Party of India (Marxist) to form the Communist Party of India (Marxist-Leninist).

The Communist Party of India (Maoist) is the leading Maoist organisation in India. The CPI (Maoist) is designated as a terrorist organisation in India under the Unlawful Activities (Prevention) Act. Since 1967, there has been an ongoing conflict in India between the Indian government and Maoist insurgents. As of 2018, there have been a total of 13,834 deaths across insurgents, security forces, and civilians.

=== Iran ===
The Union of Iranian Communists (Sarbedaran) was an Iranian Maoist organisation. The UIC (S) was formed in 1976 after the alliance of Maoist groups carrying out military actions within Iran. In 1982, the UIC (S) mobilised forces in forests around Amol and launched an insurgency against the Islamist Government. The uprising was eventually a failure, and many UIC (S) leaders were shot. The party dissolved in 1982.

Following the dissolution of the Union of Iranian Communists, the Communist Party of Iran (Marxist–Leninist–Maoist) was formed in 2001. The party is a continuation of the Sarbedaran Movement and the Union of Iranian Communists (Sarbedaran). CPI (MLM) believes Iran is a 'semifeudal-semicolonial' country and is trying to launch a 'People's war' in Iran.

=== Israel ===
The 1970s group Ma'avak (an offshoot of Matzpen) was influenced by Maoism. After a further split, some of its former members (including Ehud Adiv and Daud Turki) were charged with treason for meeting with Syrian intelligence officials, in a highly publicised trial.

=== Italy ===
In Italy, the articles "The Differences between comrade Togliatti and us" (Renmin Ribao, December 31, 1962), which was published as Le Divergenze tra il compagno Togliatti e noi in Italian, and the "More on the differences between comrade Togliatti and us" (Hongqi, March 4, 1963) increased interest in the Chinese communist approach. The text, written in China, responded to Palmiro Togliatti's criticisms of Mao for Mao's opposition to de-Stalinization. Months after the publication of Le Divergenze, the first Italian party inspired by Mao's ideology was founded.

Shortly after, former partisan Giuseppe Regis founded the publisher Edizioni Oriente (Eastern Editions), which translated and published Maoist texts, including Quotations from Chairman Mao Zedong. In early 1964, Mao-oriented activists founded the newspaper Nuova Unità (New Unity), which called for Italian communists break with the stance of the Italian Communist Party and align with the socialist countries against American imperialism. From this group several splits occurred.

Numerous political factions and groupings took inspiration from Mao's theories and practice. Among the most visible Mao-inspired group was Servire il Popolo (Serve the People), which modelled itself on the Red Guards of China. Servire il Popolo practiced self-criticism and "serving and teaching the peasants" in rural Italy.

Another group is PMLI, which was pro-Deng initially but since 1980s reverted to more traditional Maoism. Party created several controversies in Italian politics.

Violent groups which cited Mao included the Brigate Rosse (Red Brigades) and the Lotta Continua (Continuous Fight).

=== Mao-Spontex ===
Mao-Spontex refers to a Maoist interpretation in western Europe that stresses the importance of the cultural revolution and overthrowing hierarchy. A political movement in the Marxist and libertarian movements in Western Europe from 1968 to 1971, Mao-Spontex came to represent an ideology promoting the ideas of Maoism with some influence from Marxism and Leninism, but rejecting the total idea of Marxism–Leninism.

=== Palestine ===
The Democratic Front for the Liberation of Palestine was initially influenced by Maoism but shifted towards the Soviet Union after 1970.

=== Peru ===
As a result of factors including the Sino-Soviet split in the early 1960s and the later development of Shining Path, Peru became the Latin American country with the largest Maoist tendency among its communist movements.

The Maoist-inspired group Shining Path and its leader Abimael Guzmán viewed revolution as requiring prolonged people's war. According to academic Carlos Iván Degregori, Shining Path's view of violence exceeded the typical Maoist confines, with Shining Path viewing violence as a value in itself instead of a means. In the 1980s and 1990s, it waged an insurgency against the Peruvian state that resulted in tens of thousands of deaths.

=== Philippines ===
The Communist Party of the Philippines is the largest communist party in the Philippines, active since December 26, 1968 (Mao's birthday). It was formed due to the First Great Rectification Movement and a split between the old Partido Komunista ng Pilipinas-1930, which the founders saw as revisionist. The CPP was formed on Maoist lines in stark contrast with the old PKP, which focused primarily on the parliamentary struggle. The CPP was founded by Jose Maria Sison and other cadres from the old party.

The CPP also has an armed wing that it exercises absolute control over, namely the New People's Army. It currently wages a guerrilla war against the government of the Republic of the Philippines in the countryside and is still currently active. The CPP and the NPA are part of the National Democratic Front of the Philippines, a consolidation of Maoist sectoral organisations such as Kabataang Makabayan as part of the united front strategy. The NDFP also represents the people's democratic government in peace talks.

=== Portugal ===
The flag of FP-25

Maoist movements in Portugal were very active during the 1970s, especially during the Carnation Revolution that led to the fall of the nationalist government (the Estado Novo) in 1974.

Portugal's most significant Maoist movement was the Portuguese Workers' Communist Party. The party was among the most active resistance movements before the Portuguese democratic revolution of 1974, especially among the Marxist–Leninist Students' Federation in Lisbon. After the revolution, the MRPP achieved fame for its large and highly artistic mural paintings.

Intensely active between 1974 and 1975, during that time, the party had members that later came to be significant in national politics. For example, a future Prime Minister of Portugal, José Manuel Durão Barroso, was active in Maoist movements in Portugal and identified as a Maoist. In the 1980s, the Forças Populares 25 de Abril was another far-left Maoist armed organisation operating in Portugal between 1980 and 1987, aiming to create socialism in post-revolutionary Portugal.

=== Spain ===
The main Spanish Maoist group was Communist Party of Spain (Marxist–Leninist). The PCE (m-l) was the principal organiser and leading force of the Revolutionary Antifascist Patriotic Front, an anti-Francoist paramilitary organisation. Execution of the FRAP and ETA members by the Francoist regime in 1975 marked an important pillar in the process of the fall of Francoist Spain. After the CPE (m-l)'s rejection of Maoism with the Sino-Albanian Split, Communist Party of Spain (Reconstituted), a Spanish clandestine Maoist party, became the most prominent Maoist group in Spain. The party's armed wing was the First of October Anti-Fascist Resistance Groups.

=== Sweden ===
In 1968, a small extremist Maoist sect called Rebels (Swedish: Rebellerna) was established in Stockholm. Led by Francisco Sarrión, the group unsuccessfully demanded that the Chinese embassy admit them into the Chinese Communist Party. The organisation only lasted a few months. Aside from this short-lived group, there were several Maoists groups, which some later joined to the pro-Albanian camp: KFML-SKP (pro-China, pro-TWT, pro-Deng), KPS (shortly after its founding pro-Albania, anti-Mao, splinter from the KFML-SKP), MLK (pro-China, pro-TWT, pro-Deng, later joined to the KFML-SKP), KFML(r)-KPML(r) (later pro-Albanian, anti-Mao, splinter from the KFML-SKP) and the SKP (ml)-SKA (pro-Mao, anti-Deng, splinter from the KFML-SKP).

=== Tanzania ===
The Tanzanian socialist approach of ujamaa promoted by President Julius Nyerere drew on Maoist themes including self-reliance, mass politics, the political centrality of the peasantry. Ujamaa also adopted Chinese historic milestones as part of its symbolism, including the Cultural Revolution and the Long March.

=== Turkey ===
The Communist Party of Turkey/Marxist–Leninist (TKP/ML) is a Maoist organisation in Turkey currently waging a people's war against the Turkish government. It was founded in 1972 as a split from another illegal Maoist party, the Revolutionary Workers' and Peasants' Party of Turkey (TİİKP), which Doğu Perinçek founded in 1969, led by İbrahim Kaypakkaya. The party's armed wing is named the Workers' and Peasants' Liberation Army in Turkey (TİKKO). TİİKP is succeeded by the Patriotic Party, headed by Perinçek. Though Perinçek was significantly influenced by Mao, the Patriotic Party says he's not a Maoist, instead saying that he embraced "Mao's contributions to the literature of the world revolution and scientific socialism" and "adapted them to Turkey's conditions".

=== United States ===
After the tumultuous 1960s (particularly the events of 1968, such as the launch of the Tet Offensive, the assassination of Martin Luther King Jr., nationwide university protests, and the election of Richard Nixon), proponents of Maoist ideology constituted the "largest and most dynamic" branch of American socialism. From this branch came a collection of "newspapers, journals, books, and pamphlets," each of which spoke on the unreasonability of the American system and proclaimed the need for a concerted social revolution. Among the many Maoist principles, the group of aspiring American revolutionaries sympathised with the idea of a protracted people's war, which would allow citizens to address the oppressive nature of global capitalism martially. Maoism was a major influence on the New Communist movement.

Mounting discontent with racial oppression and socioeconomic exploitation birthed the two largest, officially-organised Maoist groups: the Revolutionary Communist Party and the October League. However, these were not the only groups: a slew of organisations and movements emerged across the globe as well, including I Wor Kuen, the Black Workers Congress, the Puerto Rican Revolutionary Workers Organization, the August Twenty-Ninth Movement, the Workers Viewpoint Organization, and many others—all of which overtly supported Maoist doctrine.

Orchestrated by The National Guardian, in the spring of 1973, an attempt to conflate the strands of American Maoism was made with a series of sponsored forums titled "What Road to Building a New Communist Party?" The forums drew 1,200 attendees to a New York City auditorium that spring. The central message of the event revolved around "building an anti-revisionist, non-Trotskyist, non-anarchist party". From this, other forums were held worldwide, covering topics such as "The Role of the Anti-Imperialist Forces in the Antiwar Movement" and "The Question of the Black Nation"—each forum rallying, on average, an audience of 500 activists, and serving as a "barometer of the movement's strength."

The Americans' burgeoning Maoist and Marxist–Leninist movements proved optimistic for a potential revolution, but "a lack of political development and rampant rightist and ultra-leftist opportunism" thwarted the advancement of the greater communist initiative. In 1972, Richard Nixon made a landmark visit to the People's Republic of China to shake hands with Chairman Mao Zedong; this simple handshake marked the gradual pacification of east–west hostility and the re-formation of relations between "the most powerful and most populous" global powers: the United States and China. Nearly a decade after the Sino-Soviet split, this newfound amiability between the two nations quieted American-based counter-capitalist rumblings and marked the steady decline of American Maoism until its unofficial cessation in the early-1980s.

The Black Panther Party (BPP) was another American-based, left-wing revolutionary party to oppose American global imperialism; it was a self-described Black militant organisation with metropolitan chapters in Oakland, California, New York, Chicago, Seattle, and Los Angeles, and an overt sympathiser with global anti-imperialistic movements (e.g., Vietnam's resistance of American neo-colonial efforts). In 1971, a year before Nixon's monumental visit, BPP leader Huey P. Newton landed in China, whereafter he was enthralled with the East and the achievements of the Chinese Communist Revolution. After his return to the United States, Newton said that "[e]verything I saw in China demonstrated that the People's Republic is a free and liberated territory with a socialist government" and "[t]o see a classless society in operation is unforgettable". He extolled the Chinese police force as one that "[served] the people" and considered the Chinese antithetical to American law enforcement, which, according to Newton, represented "one huge armed group that was opposed to the will of the people". In general, Newton's first encounter with anti-capitalist society commenced a psychological liberation and embedded within him the desire to subvert the American system in favour of what the BPP called "revolutionary intercommunalism". Furthermore, the BPP was founded on a similar politico-philosophical framework as that of Mao's CCP, that is, "the philosophical system of dialectical materialism" coupled with traditional Marxist theory. The words of Mao, quoted liberally in BPP speeches and writings, served as a guiding light for the party's analysis and theoretical application of Marxist ideology.

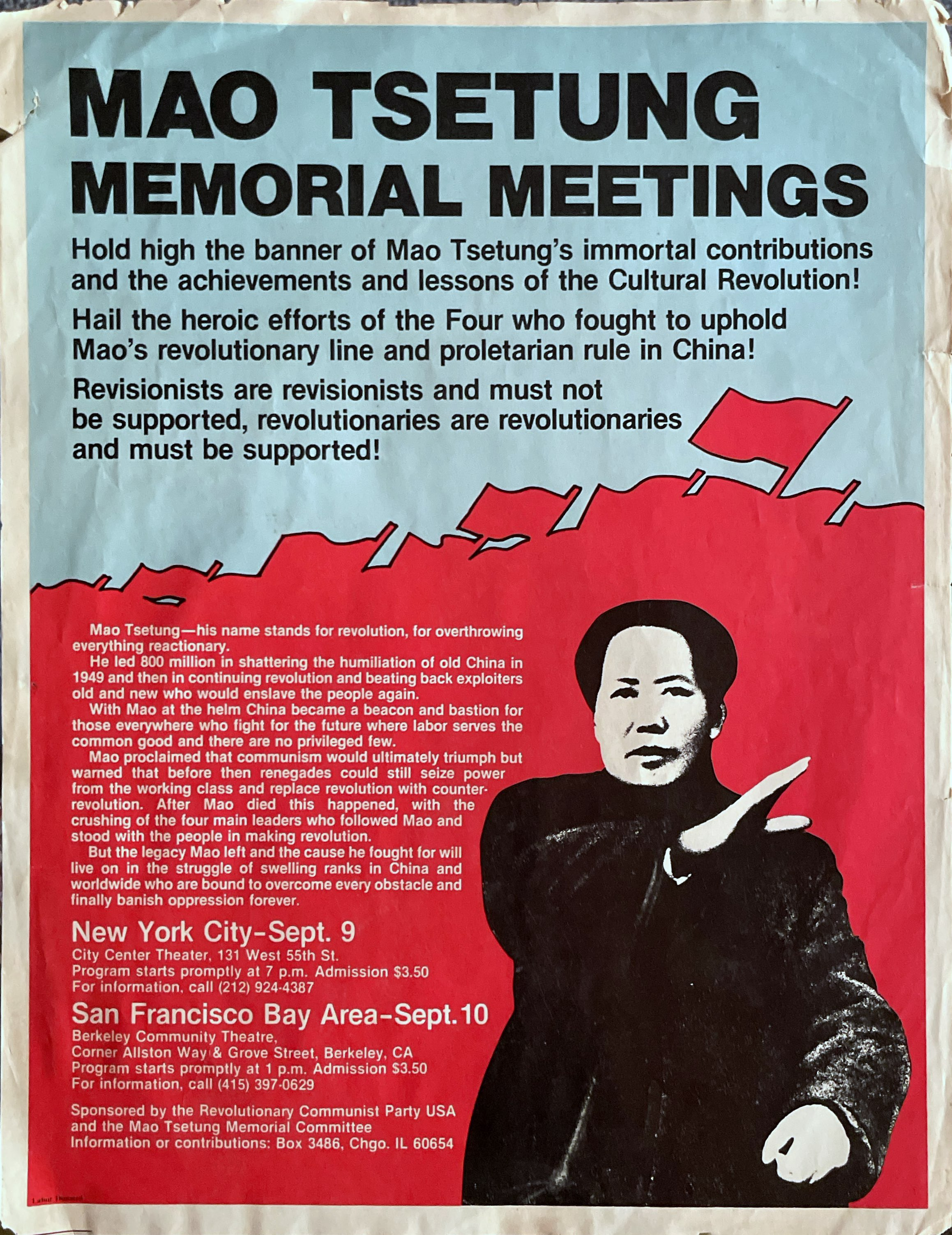
1978 Revolutionary Communist Party USA poster commemorating Mao's legacy.

In his autobiography Revolutionary Suicide, published in 1973, Newton wrote:

Chairman Mao says that death comes to all of us, but it varies in its significance: to die for the reactionary is lighter than a feather; to die for the revolution is heavier than Mount Tai. [...] When I presented my solutions to the problems of Black people, or when I expressed my philosophy, people said, "Well, isn't that socialism?" Some of them were using the socialist label to put me down, but I figured that if this was socialism, then socialism must be a correct view. So I read more of the works of the socialists and began to see a strong similarity between my beliefs and theirs. My conversion was complete when I read the four volumes of Mao Tse-tung to learn more about the Chinese Revolution.

== Criticism and implementation ==
Maoism has fallen out of favour within the Chinese Communist Party, beginning with Deng Xiaoping's reforms in 1978. Deng believed that Maoism showed the dangers of "ultra-leftism", manifested in the harm perpetrated by the various mass movements that characterised the Maoist era. In Chinese communism, the term "left" can be considered a euphemism for Maoist policies. However, Deng stated that the revolutionary side of Maoism should be considered separate from the governance side, leading to his famous epithet that Mao was "70% right, 30% wrong". Chinese scholars generally agree that Deng's interpretation of Maoism preserves the legitimacy of Communist rule in China but simultaneously criticises Mao's brand of economic and political governance.

Some scholars outside China see this re-working of the definition of Maoism as providing an ideological justification for what they see as the restoration of the essentials of capitalism in China by Deng and his successors, who sought to "eradicate all ideological and physiological obstacles to economic reform".

In 1978, this led to the Sino-Albanian split when Albanian leader Enver Hoxha denounced Deng as a revisionist, stating "The events and facts are demonstrating ever more clearly that China is sinking deeper and deeper into revisionism, capitalism and imperialism" and formed Hoxhaism as an anti-revisionist form of Marxism.

Enver Hoxha critiqued Maoism from a Marxist–Leninist perspective, arguing that New Democracy halts class struggle and allows unrestricted capitalist exploitation, that the theory of the three worlds is "counter-revolutionary", and questioned Mao's guerrilla warfare methods.

Critic Graham Young says that Maoists see Joseph Stalin as the last true socialist leader of the Soviet Union but allows the Maoist assessments of Stalin to vary between the extremely positive and the more ambivalent. Some political philosophers, such as Martin Cohen, have seen in Maoism an attempt to combine Confucianism and socialism—what one such called "a third way between communism and capitalism".

Slavoj Žižek asserts that the major development of Marxism Mao made lies in his materialistic dialectics, and thinks Mao actually rejects Hegel's dialectical synthesis of "the negation of negation", but develops "negative dialectics" on the basis of the disadvantage of infinity.

Jung Chang and Jon Halliday contend that implementation of Maoist thought in China was responsible for as many as 70 million deaths during peacetime, with the Cultural Revolution, the Anti-Rightist Campaign of 1957–1958, and the Great Leap Forward. Active campaigns, including party purges and "reeducation", resulted in imprisonment or the execution of those deemed contrary to the implementation of Maoist ideals. Some historians have argued that because of Mao's land reforms during the Great Leap Forward which resulted in famines, thirty million perished between 1958 and 1961. By the end of 1961, the birth rate was nearly cut in half because of malnutrition. Critiquing discourses on deaths under Maoism, academics Christian Sorace, Ivan Franeschini, and Nicholas Loubere observe that these discourses attribute responsibility for deaths in manner not typical of discourses on other ideologies, such as liberalism.

Some Western scholars saw Maoism as specifically engaged in a battle to dominate and subdue nature and was a catastrophe for the environment.

=== Nationalism ===
Mao's nationalist impulses also played a crucially important role in adapting Marxism to the Chinese model and in the formation of Maoism. Mao believed that China was to play a crucial preliminary role in the socialist revolution internationally. This belief, or the fervour with which Mao held it, separated Mao from the other Chinese communists and led Mao onto the path of what Leon Trotsky called "Messianic Revolutionary Nationalism", which was central to his philosophy.
