= Francisco Sarrión =

Spanish leader of a Maoist sect

Francisco Sarrión (June 18, 1937 – 1996) was a Spanish-born Maoist, mostly known as the leader of a small, short lived Maoist sect in Sweden in 1968. In Sweden, Sarrión sometimes used the pseudonym Fredrik Svensson.

Sarrión lived in the People's Republic of China for a while in the 1960s where he came in contact with group of Swedish Maoists visiting China. He decided to move to Sweden, where he in 1968 became the indisputable leader of a small extremist Maoist sect, called Rebellerna ("The Rebels"). The Rebels rebelled against the broader Leftist and Maoists movement, which they considered corrupted. They even went to the Chinese embassy in Stockholm where they demanded to become members of the Chinese Communist Party. When they were denied membership, because they were not Chinese citizens, Francisco Sarrión declared that the embassy was under the control of reactionary bureaucrats who had betrayed Mao Zedong.

Francisco Sarrión was a charismatic leader who could gather and control a group of young, dedicated followers around him. Witnesses have described Sarrión acting more like a fanatic religious preacher than a politician.

The Rebel Movement only lasted for a couple of months, but during this time, its members rapidly broke off all contact with the rest of society, including their families. The group of approximately 100 members was divided into smaller cells, living isolated in 7 apartments in Stockholm and one apartment in Uppsala, where they were to study the works of Mao and prepare for the coming world revolution. Only the leadership, the central committee, with Sarrión as chairman, knew were the different cells were located.

Eventually the sect imploded and Francisco Sarrión, after having failed to obtain a Swedish citizenship, moved back to Spain and lived the last years of his life in the Canary Islands, working in the tourist industry until his death.
