= Carlos Iván Degregori =

Peruvian anthropologist (1945-2011)

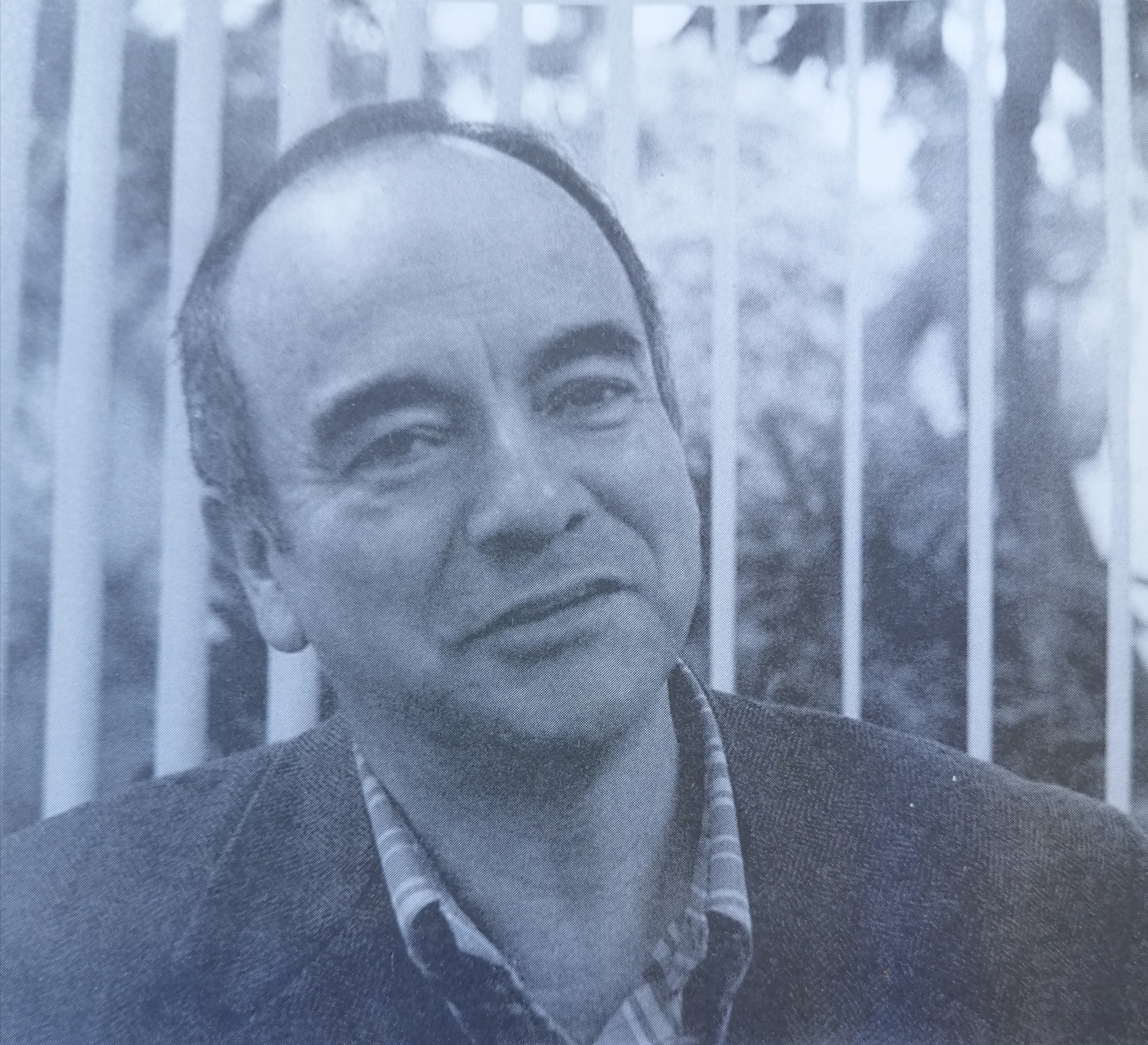
Carlos Iván Degregori

Carlos Iván Degregori Caso (1945-2011) was a Peruvian anthropologist, professor, academic and researcher.

== Biography ==
Carlos Iván Degregori was born in Lima in 1945. He studied anthropology at the National University of San Cristobal de Huamanga and Brandeis University, then earned a master's degree from the National University of San Marcos, where he later became a professor and director of the School of Anthropology. He also worked as a researcher at the Institute of Peruvian Studies and was a visiting professor at the University of Cambridge.

Degregori was involved with the Maoist faction of the Revolutionary Left Movement (MIR) with Carlos Tapia. He played a role in organizing strikes, forming defense fronts, and peasant congresses from the mid-1970s to 1980.

In 1982, after some leftists supported the Shining Path (SL) assault on the Ayacucho prison, Degregori wrote an article criticizing such a view, describing the attack as being carried out in a “distant border garrison of state power”. Between 1984 and 1990, he dedicated himself to investigating the Shining Path with the aim of “demystifying SL” so that it would no longer be considered as the “conscience of the left” by various groups of the Peruvian left.

He was a member and the main writer of the Truth and Reconciliation Commission report.

Carlos Iván Degregori died in Lima on May 18, 2011. His remains were kept vigil at the Church of La Recoleta in the historic center of Lima and then transferred to the British Cemetery for cremation after a funeral mass on May 20, 2011.
